= List of disasters in Canada by death toll =

This list of Canadian disasters by death toll includes major disasters (excluding acts of war) that occurred on Canadian soil or involved Canadian citizens, in a definable incident, where the loss of life was 10 or more.

== 200 or more deaths ==
Fatalities	Year	Article	Type	Location	Comments
60,000+	2020–2024	COVID-19	Pandemic	Canada	In October 2024, the Public Health Agency of Canada stopped updating COVID-19 statistics
~50,000	1918-1920	1918 influenza pandemic	Pandemic	Canada	
25,000+	1982–present	HIV/AIDS	Pandemic	Canada	Ongoing
~20,000	1847-1848	Canadian typhus	Epidemic	Canada	
~6,000-8,000	1889-1891	Russian flu	Pandemic	Canada	
~7,000	1957-1958	Asian flu	Pandemic	Canada	
~4,000	1775	Newfoundland Hurricane of 1775	Hurricane	Newfoundland	
~4,000	1968-1970	Hong Kong flu	Pandemic	Canada	
~2,000-5,000	1700	1700 Cascadia earthquake	Earthquake	British Columbia	True figures are undetermined.
2,000	~1700	Tseax Cone	Volcanic eruption	Northwestern British Columbia	
2,000	1917	Halifax Explosion	Explosion	Halifax, Nova Scotia	9000 injured.
1,012	1914	RMS Empress of Ireland	Shipwreck	St. Lawrence River, Quebec	
890	1711	Quebec expedition (1711)	Shipwreck	Quebec	Failed expedition that led to the drowning of about 890
676	2021	2021 Western North America heat wave	Heat wave	Alberta and British Columbia	610 excess deaths in BC and 66 excess deaths in Alberta during the week
500+	1953	Polio	Epidemic	Canada	
562	1873	RMS Atlantic	Shipwreck	Mars Island, Nova Scotia	
428	2009-2010	Swine flu	Pandemic	Canada	3 million Canadians infected
360	1758	Duke William	Shipwreck	Atlantic Ocean near the coast of France	ship wrecked during the expulsion of the Acadians
353	1918	SS Princess Sophia	Shipwreck	Near Juneau, Alaska	en route from Vancouver and Victoria to northern BC and Alaska
340	1805	Aeneas	Shipwreck	Isle aux Morts, Newfoundland	
300	1758	Violet	Shipwreck	Atlantic Ocean near the coast of England	during the expulsion of the Acadians bound for France
316	1834	Sybelle	Shipwreck	St. Paul Island, Nova Scotia	Wreck of an Emigrant ship on way to Canada
300	1885	Great Labrador Gale of 1885	Hurricane	Labrador coast	
275	1875	SS Pacific	Shipwreck	near Cape Flattery out of Victoria, British Columbia	
265	1833	Lady of the Lake (brig)	Shipwreck	near Cape St. Francis (Newfoundland and Labrador), Newfoundland and Labrador	The brig called Lady of the Lake sank near Cape St. Francis after a collision with ice killing 265 people
256	1985	Arrow Air Flight 1285	Plane crash	Gander, Newfoundland	As of 2026, it is the deadliest aviation accident to occur on Canadian soil.
253	1857	SS Montreal	Shipwreck	St. Lawrence River, Quebec	Caught on fire near Quebec City
250	1913	Great Lakes Storm of 1913	Blizzard/Storm	Great Lakes, Ontario	
238	1797	HMS Tribune	Shipwreck	Halifax Harbour, Nova Scotia	
237	1863	SS Anglo Saxon	Shipwreck	Cape Race, Avalon Peninsula, Newfoundland	Allan Line shipwreck
229	1998	Swissair Flight 111	Plane crash	St. Margarets Bay, Nova Scotia	
223-600	1873	Nova Scotia hurricane of 1873	Hurricane	Nova Scotia	The Monthly Weather Review, published by the American Meteorological Society, set the death toll at 223 but the New York Times set the toll at 600
223	1916	Matheson Fire	Fire (Forest fire)	Black River-Matheson, Ontario	Official estimate
221	1834	Astrea (1812 ship)	Shipwreck	Sank east of Louisbourg, Nova Scotia	Sank with 224 people aboard. Only 3 survived
205	1860	SS Hungarian	Shipwreck	Cape Sable Island, Nova Scotia	Allan Line passenger ship wrecked Cape Sable, NS
203	1942	USS Pollux (AKS-2) and USS Truxtun (DD-229)	Shipwreck	Placentia Bay, Newfoundland	Wreck of the USS Pollux resulted in 93 fatalities and USS Truxtun 110; the USS Wilkes (DD-441) also grounded but suffered no fatalities.

== 100 to 199 deaths ==
Fatalities	Year	Article	Type	Location	Comments
190+	1758	Ruby	Shipwreck	Azores, Portugal	during the expulsion of the Acadians
189	1914	Hillcrest mine disaster	Mine Explosion	Hillcrest, Crowsnest Pass, Alberta	Deadliest mining disaster in Canadian history
182+	1881	Victoria steamboat disaster	Shipwreck	London, Ontario	
15?	1943	Dawson Creek Alaska Highway explosion	Fire, then explosion	Dawson Creek, BC	(Death toll never determined. at least five U.S. servicemen, perhaps as many as 20 or more; unknown number of local deaths.
174	1914	SS Southern Cross	Shipwreck	Off the coast of Newfoundland	
173	1918	SS Florizel	Shipwreck	Cappahayden, Newfoundland	
173-192	1927	1927 Nova Scotia hurricane	Hurricane	Nova Scotia and surrounding area	Approximate figure, most fatalities occurred at sea
160	1825	Miramichi fire	Forest fire	Northern New Brunswick, including the towns of Fredericton, Miramichi, and Doaktown	
150	1887	Nanaimo mine explosion	Mine Explosion	Nanaimo, British Columbia	
137	1942	SS Caribou	Shipwreck	Sank southwest of Channel-Port aux Basques, Newfoundland and Labrador	
136	1906	SS Valencia	Shipwreck	Cape Beale, Vancouver Island, British Columbia	
130	1845-1848	Franklin's lost expedition	Failed expedition	King William Island area, Nunavut	The final expedition of John Franklin, where HMS Erebus and HMS Terror were lost in the Northwest Passage
128	1902	Coal Creek mine disaster	Mine explosion	Coal Creek, British Columbia	
125	1891	First Springhill mining disaster	Mine Explosion	Springhill, Nova Scotia	
123	1882	SS Asia	Shipwreck	Georgian Bay	
118	1949	SS Noronic	Shipwreck	Toronto, Ontario	
118	1963	Trans-Canada Air Lines Flight 831	Plane crash	Sainte-Thérèse, Quebec	
115	1828	HMS Acorn	Shipwreck	Halifax, Nova Scotia	
114	1942	HMS Crusader (H60)	Shipwreck	Sank east of St. John's, Newfoundland and Labrador	
114	1761	Auguste (1758 ship)	Shipwreck	Sank in Aspy Bay, Nova Scotia	There was 121 aboard the ship and only 7 survived
110	1942	USS Truxtun (DD-229)	Shipwreck	Lawn, Newfoundland and Labrador	Sank alongside USS Pollux (AKS-2)
109	1970	Air Canada Flight 621	Plane crash	Brampton, Ontario	
102	1711	HMS Feversham	Shipwreck	Scatarie Island, Main-à-Dieu, Nova Scotia	

== 99 to 10 deaths ==
Fatalities	Year	Incident Name	Type	Location	Comments
99	1864	Beloeil train disaster	Train wreck	Beloeil, Quebec	Deadliest train disaster in Canada
77	1888	Wllington coal mine disaster	Mine Explosion	Wellington, Vancouver Island, BC	
99	1942	Knights of Columbus Hostel fire	Fire (Suspected Arson)	St. John's, Newfoundland	
94	1918	SS Florizel	Shipwreck	Sank near Renews-Cappahayden, Newfoundland	Sank after collision with rocks
93	1942	USS Pollux (AKS-2)	Shipwreck	Lawn, Newfoundland and Labrador	
90	1711	HMS Feversham (1696)	Shipwreck	Scatarie Island Nova Scotia	90 crew members drowned while the other 45 crew members survived
88	1918	Allan mine explosion	Mine explosion	Stellarton, Nova Scotia	
87	1942	SS Cyclops (1906)	Shipwreck	off the coast of Nova Scotia	British cargo steamship SS Cyclops was sunk in 1942 after being hit by a torpedo from a German submarine killing 87 of the men aboard it
84	1982	Ocean Ranger	Oil platform sinking	Grand Banks, Newfoundland	
81 (Canadians)	1954	Hurricane Hazel	Hurricane	Ontario	
79	1957	Maritime Central Airways Flight 315	Plane crash	Issoudun, Quebec	
78	1914	1914 Newfoundland Sealing Disaster	Storm	Atlantic Ocean off the coast of Newfoundland	Fatalities from the SS Southern Cross are excluded
77	1927	Laurier Palace Theatre fire	Fire	Montreal, Quebec	
75	1907	First Quebec Bridge collapse	Bridge collapse	Quebec City, Quebec	
75	1958	Third Springhill mining disaster	Mine bump	Springhill, Nova Scotia	
74	2018	2018 North American heat wave	Heat wave	Quebec and Ontario	
73-200	1911	Great Porcupine Fire	Fire (Forest fire)	Porcupine, Ontario	
70	1903	Frank Slide	Rockslide	Frank, Crowsnest Pass, North-West Territories (Modern day Alberta)	
65	1917	Dominion No. 12 Colliery explosion	Mine explosion	New Waterford, Nova Scotia	
64	1966	Canadian Pacific Airlines Flight 402	Plane crash	Tokyo, Japan	Crashed on landing at Haneda Airport in Tokyo with 8 survivors
64	1813	HMS Tweed (1807)	Shipwreck	Shoal Bay (Newfoundland and Labrador)	
62	1910	Rogers Pass avalanche	Avalanche	Rogers Pass, British Columbia	
62	1956	Trans-Canada Air Lines Flight 810	Plane crash	Chilliwack, British Columbia	
60	1915	Britannia Mine Jane Camp landslide	Landslide	Britannia Beach, British Columbia	
59	1857	Desjardins Canal disaster	Train wreck	Hamilton, Ontario	On March 12, 1857, A train carrying 90 passengers crashed through a bridge over the Desjardins Canal causing the train to fall onto the ice below killing 59 people and injuring 18 others.
59	1828	Despatch	Shipwreck	Isle aux Morts, Newfoundland	
58	1945	German submarine U-548	Shipwreck	Sank southeast of Halifax, Nova Scotia	All 58 people on the submarine were lost with it
55	1896	Point Ellice Bridge disaster	Tram accident	Victoria, British Columbia	
55-58	1926	1926 Nova Scotia hurricane	Hurricane	Nova Scotia	Approximate number, most deaths occurred at sea.
54	2018	2018 Eastern Canada heat wave	Heat wave	Eastern Canada	
53	1943	German submarine U-174	Shipwreck	Sank southwest of Newfoundland	No survivors
53	1942	German submarine U-520	Shipwreck	Sank east of Newfoundland	No survivors
52	1854	Jeannette's Creek train wreck	Train collision	Jeannettes Creek, Ontario	
52-232	1900	1900 Galveston Hurricane	Hurricane	Eastern Canada	
52	1965	Canadian Pacific Airlines Flight 21	Mass murder	near 100 Mile House, British Columbia	Crashed after a bomb exploded on board. The motive and perpetrator(s) remain unknown.
50 - 60	1849	Hannah (1849 shipwreck)	Shipwreck	Gulf of St. Lawrence	
48	1979	Opémiska Community Hall fire	Fire	Chapais, Quebec	
47	1942	SS Empire Dabchick	Shipwreck	Sank southeast of Sable Island, Nova Scotia	Sank with the loss of 36 crew and 11 DEMS gunners
47	2013	Lac-Mégantic rail disaster	Train wreck	Lac-Mégantic, Quebec	
44-63	1910	Spanish River derailment	Train wreck	Nairn, Ontario	
44	1950	1950 Douglas C-54D disappearance	Plane crash (suspected)	Somewhere between Snag and Aishihik, Yukon Territory	42 US military personnel and 2 civilians. No trace of the plane has ever been found.
44	1997	1997 Les Éboulements bus accident	Bus crash	Les Éboulements, Quebec	
44	1880	Foord Pit explosion	Mine explosion	Stellarton, Nova Scotia	
44	1917	CGS Simcoe (1909)	Shipwreck	Sank near the Magdalen Islands, Quebec	No survivors
43	1922	Great Fire of 1922	Fire (Wildfire)	Timiskaming District, Ontario	
43	2003	2003 SARS outbreak	Outbreak	Toronto, Ontario	Out of a total of 251 cases
43	1942	German submarine U-754	Shipwreck	Sank near Yarmouth, Nova Scotia	No survivors, all 43 aboard the submarine died
43	1978	Pacific Western Airlines Flight 314	Plane crash	Cranbrook, British Columbia	
40+	1815	HMS Penelope	Shipwreck	near Cap des Rosiers, Quebec	Many survivors later froze to death.
40	1889	Quebec rockslide	Rockslide	Quebec City, Quebec	
40	1901	SS Islander	Shipwreck	Lynn Canal, Alaska	Sunk by an iceberg south of Juneau
40	1918	HMCS Galiano	Shipwreck	Queen Charlotte Sound 20 miles (32 km) of Kunghit Island, British Columbia	
40	1978	Eastman bus crash	Bus crash	Eastman, Quebec	
39	1928	Hollinger Mining Disaster	Mine fire	Timmins, Ontario	
39	1942	Almonte train wreck	Train collision	Almonte, Ontario	
39	1956	Second Springhill mining disaster	Mine explosion	Springhill, Nova Scotia	
39	1946	1946 American Overseas Airlines Douglas DC-4 crash	Plane crash	Stephenville, Newfoundland	
39	1945	HMCS Esquimalt	Shipwreck	Sank off Chebucto Head, Nova Scotia	
38	1850	Commerce	Shipwreck	Port Maitland, Ontario	
38	1969	1969 Notre-Dame-du-Lac Nursing Home Fire	Fire	Notre-Dame-du-Lac, Quebec	
37	1867	Great Labrador Gale of 1867	Storm	Labrador, Newfoundland	
37+	1869	1869 Saxby Gale	Tropical cyclone	Maritime provinces	Most deaths occurred at sea
37	1951	1951 Canadian Pacific Air Douglas DC-4 disappearance	Plane crash (suspected)	Pacific Ocean near Yakutat, Alaska	
37	1972	Blue Bird Café fire	Fire (Arson)	Montreal, Quebec	
37	1921	Britannia Beach flood	Flood	Britannia Beach, British Columbia	
37	1954	Trans-Canada Air Lines Flight 9	Planes in mid-air collision	Moose Jaw, Saskatchewan	
36	1952	Northwest Orient Airlines Flight 324	Plane crash	Sandspit, British Columbia	
35	1959	1959 Escuminac hurricane	Hurricane	Gulf of St. Lawrence, New Brunswick	
35	1967	ČSA Flight 523	Plane crash	Gander, Newfoundland	
32	2014	L'Isle-Verte nursing home fire	Fire	L'Isle-Verte, Quebec	
32	1971	MV Meteor	Ship fire	Pacific Ocean off of Vancouver, British Columbia	
32	1974	Panarctic Oils Flight 416	Plane crash	Melville Island, Northwest Territories	
32	1909	Wellington Collieries cave-in	Mining accident	Extension, British Columbia	
32	1910	1910 Herald fire	Fire	Montreal, Quebec	
31	1902	Wanstead train disaster	Train wreck	Wanstead, Ontario	
31	1882	Halifax Poor House fire	Fire	Halifax, Nova Scotia	
31	1947	Dugald train disaster	Train collision	Dugald, Manitoba	
31	1910	Bellevue mine disaster	Mine explosion	Bellevue, Alberta	21 of the deaths caused by inhaling carbon dioxide and carbon monoxide
31	1971	Saint-Jean-Vianney landslide	Landslide	Saint-Jean-Vianney, Quebec	
30	1930	John B. King explosion	Explosion	near Brockville, Ontario	Lightning struck a drill boat containing dynamite
30	2003	2003 Avalanche season	Avalanche	Western Canada (Alberta and British Columbia)	Deadliest avalanche season in Canada since 1970
30 (approx.)	1971	Eastern Canadian blizzard of March 1971	Blizzard	Quebec	
30	1979	Sinking of the Lee Wang Zin	Shipwreck	Dixon Entrance, British Columbia	
30	1932	Cymbeline explosion	Explosion	Montreal	Steamship SS Cymbeline exploded killing at least 30 men.
30	1942	Saganaga	Shipwreck	Conception Bay, Newfoundland	List of shipwrecks in September 1942#5 September
29	1929	1929 Grand Banks earthquake	Earthquake and tsunami	Burin Peninsula, Newfoundland	Mainly affecting the town of Burin
29	1975	SS Edmund Fitzgerald	Shipwreck	Northwest of Pancake Bay, Ontario in Lake Superior	
29	1941	Brazeau Collieries Mine explosion	Mine explosion	Rocky Mountain House, Alberta	
28	1912	Regina Cyclone	Tornado	Regina, Saskatchewan	
28	1965	LaSalle Heights disaster	Explosion (gas-line)	LaSalle, Quebec	
28 (Canadian fatalities only)	1998	North American ice storm of 1998	Ice storm	Ontario and Quebec	
28	1931	SS Viking	Explosion	Horse Islands, Newfoundland	
27	1962	Canadian Pacific Air Lines Flight 301	Plane crash	Honolulu, Hawaii	
27	1987	Edmonton tornado	Tornado	Edmonton, Alberta	
27	1946	1946 Sabena DC-4 crash	Plane crash	Gander, Newfoundland	
26+	1804	HMS Speedy	Shipwreck	Presqu'ile Bay, Lake Ontario	
26-28	1965	Granduc Mine avalanche	Avalanche	Stewart, British Columbia	
26	1992	Westray Mine methane explosion	Mine explosion	Plymouth, Nova Scotia	
26	1948	1948 Rimouski Airlines crash	Plane crash	Anticosti Island, Quebec	
25	1980	1980 Mississauga nursing home fire	Fire	Mississauga, Ontario	
25	1913	SS Argus	Shipwreck	Lake Huron	No survivors
25	1916	James B. Colgate (ship)	Shipwreck	Sank off Long Point, Ontario	Out of the 26-man crew only sea captain Walter Grashaw survived
24	1989	Air Ontario Flight 1363	Plane crash	Dryden, Ontario	
24	1943	1943 Saint-Donat RCAF Liberator III crash	Plane Crash	Saint-Donat, Quebec	
24	1916	1916 Quaker Oats explosion	Explosion, fire	Peterborough, Ontario	
23	1949	Québec Airways DC-3 bomb sabotage	Mass murder	Saint-Joachim, Quebec	Albert Guay, along with the assistance of two other people planted a bomb in a plan to kill his wife
23	1983	Air Canada Flight 797	Plane fire	Cincinnati International Airport, Kentucky	
23	1986	Hinton train collision	Train collision	Hinton, Alberta	
23	2005	Legionnaires' disease outbreak	Epidemic	Toronto, Ontario	
23	1951	1957 Queen Charlotte Airlines Canto crash	Plane crash	Mount Benson, British Columbia	
23	1947	Goose Bay USAF DC-4 crash	Plane crash	CFB Goose Bay, Newfoundland	
23	1953	1953 Random Island plane crash	Plane crash	Random Island, Nova Scotia	
22	1980	Swift Current Broncos bus crash	Bus crash	near Swift Current, Saskatchewan	
22	1958	1958 Lockheed Constellation crash	Plane crash	Argentia, Newfoundland	
22	2008	2008 Canada listeriosis outbreak	Outbreak	Toronto, Ontario	Out of 57 total cases
22	1980	CP Rail crew bus crash	Traffic collision involving a bus	Webb, Saskatchewan	
21	1977	Saint John City Hall fire	Fire (arson)	Saint John, New Brunswick	
21	2022	Capsizing of the Villa de Pitanxo	Shipwreck	Newfoundland and Labrador	
21	1950	Canoe River train crash	Train collision	Valemount, British Columbia	
21	1943	FV Flora Alberta	Ship collision	Atlantic Ocean off of Lunenburg, Nova Scotia	
21	1998	MV Flare	Shipwreck	Cabot Strait, Newfoundland	
21	1949	1949 RCAF Canso crash	Plane crash	Bigstone Lake, Manitoba	
21	1946	1946 RCAF Estevan C-47 Dakota crash	Plane crash	Estevan, Saskatchewan	
21	1938	Princess Pit rake disaster	Mining accident	Sydney Mines, Nova Scotia	
21	1966	Dorion level crossing accident (Dorion train-bus collision)	Train collision/Bus collision	Dorion, Quebec	
20	1927	Beauval Indian Residential School Fire	Fire	Beauval, Saskatchewan	
20	1941	American Airlines Flight 1 (1941)	Plane crash	In Southwold, Ontario	
20	1918	Alvin Siding camp fire	Fire	Nova Scotia	
20	1911	Sechelt (steamboat)	Shipwreck	near Race Rocks Light, British Columbia	20 estimated fatalities
20	1953	Colonial Coach Lines Bus Accident	Traffic collision	Morrisburg, Ontario	A bus and a truck collided killing 20 people
19	1993	La Tuque bus disaster	Bus crash	La Tuque, Quebec	
19	1910	SS Regulus	Shipwreck	Shoal Bay, Newfoundland	
19	1941	1941 New Brunswick Polio Epidemic	Epidemic	New Brunswick	Out of a total of 427 cases
19	1952	McGregor Mine Explosion	Mine explosion	Stellarton Nova Scotia	
19	1993	Accident at Lac-Bouchette	Traffic collision	Lac-Bouchette, Quebec	A minibus and a van collided causing a fire that killed 19
18	1958	Second Narrows Bridge collapse	Bridge collapse	Vancouver, British Columbia	A diver drowned when searching for bodies after the collapse, making total death toll 19.
18	1944	German submarine U-1229	Shipwreck	Sank south of Newfoundland	41 survivors
17	1960	Lamont school bus crash	Train collision involving a school bus	near the town of Lamont, Alberta	
17	1946	Windsor-Tecumseh tornado	Tornado	Windsor, Ontario	
17	2009	Cougar Helicopters Flight 91	Helicopter crash	Off the coast of Newfoundland	
17	1907	Hochelaga Protestant School Fire	Fire	Montreal, Quebec	
17	2023	Carberry bus crash	Traffic collision involving a bus	Carberry, Manitoba	
17	1979	Quebecair Flight 255	Plane crash	Quebec City, Quebec	
16	1918	Protection Island mining disaster	Mine elevator accident	Protection Island, Nanaimo, British Columbia	
16	2018	Humboldt Broncos bus crash	Bus crash	Armley, Saskatchewan	
16	1958	Oldfield Apartment Fire	Fire	Montreal, Quebec	
16	1935	Galt Mine No.8 Explosion	Mine explosion	Coalhurst, Alberta	
16	1928	SS Manasoo	Shipwreck	Sank near Griffith Island (Georgian Bay), Ontario	Out of the 21 people on board the Manasoo only 5 survived while the other 16 died
16	1990	1990 Faucett Perú Boeing 727 disappearance	Plane disappearance	Southeast of Cape Race, Newfoundland	
15	1898	Cornwall railway bridge collapse	Bridge collapse	Cornwall, Ontario	
15	1956	Orleans air disaster	Plane crash	Orleans, Ontario	
15	1956	Canadian Pacific Airlines Flight 307	Plane crash	Cold Bay, Alaska	
15	1944	1944 Montreal RAF Liberator VI crash	Plane crash	Griffintown, Montreal	5 crew member fatalities, 10 ground fatalities
15	1934	1934 Dundas Station train collision	Train collision	Hamilton, Ontario	Two passenger trains collide
15	1974	1974 Les Éboulements bus accident	Bus crash	Les Éboulements, Quebec	
15	1943	Bristol City (1919)	Shipwreck	Newfoundland	
15	1967	Balmer Mine Disaster	Mine explosion	Crowsnest Pass	An explosion in the Balmer north mine killed 15 miners.
15	1947	Trans-Canada Air Lines Flight 3	Plane Crash	Mount Elsay, Vancouver, British Columbia	
14	1985	Barrie tornado outbreak	Tornado outbreak	Barrie, Ontario	
14	1904	Mine disaster at Carbonado mine	Mine explosion	near Morrissey, British Columbia	
14	1957	1957 Pacific Western Airlines DC-3 crash	Plane crash	Port Hardy, British Columbia	
14	1954	Yamachiche bus collision	Traffic Collision	Yamachiche, Quebec	
14	1887	Canada Southern Railway Station train collision	Train collision	St Thomas, Ontario	14 killed and 68 injured. The collision involving two trains and the following explosions were the worst loss of life and property in the city's history.
13	1904	Sand Point train collision	Train collision	Sand Point, Ontario	
13	1916	Second Quebec Bridge collapse	Bridge collapse	Quebec City, Quebec	
13	1885	Vale Colliery explosion	Mine explosion	near Stellarton	
13	1981	MS Arctic Explorer	Shipwreck	Sank off St. Anthony, Newfoundland and Labrador	
13	1989	1989 Cormier-Village hayride accident	Hayride accident	Cormier-Village, New Brunswick	
13	1942	1942 Mount Cheam plane crash	Plane crash	Mount Cheam, British Columbia	
13	1978	1978 Lake Timiskaming canoeing tragedy	Boat accident	Lac Témiscamingue, Quebec	12 boys & 1 adult drowned, 18 survivors rescued.
12	1954	Lake of Two Mountains boating accident	Boat accident	L'Île-Bizard, Quebec	Twelve NCC (Negro Community Centre) children drown.
12	1970	M.F.V. Enterprise and MV Patrick Morris	Shipwrecks	off Cape Breton Island, Nova Scotia	The MV Patrick Morris was responding to the mayday call of the M.F.V. Enterprise when it sank as well.
12	2000	Pine Lake tornado	Tornado	Pine Lake, Alberta	A tornado hit an RV park in rural Alberta
12	2011	First Air Flight 6560	Plane crash	Resolute Bay, Nunavut	
12	1958	Alexis Creek mission hospital fire	Fire	Alexis Creek, British Columbia	
12	1979	No. 26 Colliery explosion	Mine explosion	Glace Bay	Mining explosion
12	1943	1943 Aldershot train accident	Train collision	Aldershot, Ontario	a passenger train collided with a bus, splitting it in two
12	1877	Oil Cabinet Novelty Works Company fire	Fire	Montreal, Quebec	List of disasters in Canada
12	1903	1903 Hamilton Powder Company explosion	Explosion	Departure Bay, British Columbia	
12	1922	HMS Raleigh (1919)	Shipwreck	Ran aground off Labrador	
12	1977	1977 Northern Thunderbird Air Flight crash	Plane crash	Near Northwest Regional Airport Terrace-Kitimat, British Columbia	
12	1941	1941 Armstrong plane crash	Plane Crash	Near Armstrong Airport Armstrong, Ontario	
11	2012	Hampstead crash	Traffic collision	In Hampstead near Stratford and Perth, Ontario. Ten of the killed were Peruvian Migrant workers	
11	1889	St. George bridge derailment	Train wreck	St. George, Ontario	
11	1908	1908 Medicine Hat train collision	Train collision	Dunmore, Alberta	Collision between a locomotive and a passenger train
11	1998	Propair Flight 420	Plane crash	Montréal–Mirabel International Airport, Mirabel, Quebec	
11	1919	Lac la Biche fire	Fire (Forest fire)	Alberta and Saskatchewan	
11	1946	Barry Hotel Fire	Fire	Saskatoon, Saskatchewan	
11	1950	Vancouver Island Lockheed P2V-3W Neptune crash	Plane crash	McCreight Mountain, Vancouver Island, British Columbia	
11	1925	Izumo launch collision	Shipwreck	Vancouver, British Columbia	Crew were returning to the ship on a launch after a brief excursion when the launch was struck by the tugboat Nanoose. Only 5 of the crew on board survived.
11	1899	Caledonia mine explosion	Mine explosion	Glace Bay, Nova Scotia	
11	1979	1979 Saint-Rosalie bus crash	Bus crash	Saint-Rosalie, Quebec	A bus crashed into an overpass near Saint-Rosalie killing 11 people and injuring 20 others
11	1978	1978 Airwest Airlines crash	Plane Crash	Coal Harbour, Vancouver, British Columbia	
11	1942	Excalibur	Plane Crash	Botwood, Newfoundland	
10	1960	Metropolitan Store explosion	Explosion	Windsor, Ontario	
10	1989	Rupert Hotel fire	Fire	Toronto, Ontario	
10	1985	1985 CFB Edmonton mid-air collision	Planes in mid-air collision	CFB Namao, Edmonton, Alberta	
10	1950	Leduc Hotel explosion	Explosion	Leduc, Alberta	
10	1930	McGillivray Mine explosion	Mine explosion	Coleman, Alberta	
10	1976	1976 Austin Airways DHC-3 crash	Plane crash	Fraserdale, Ontario	
10	2004	2004 Georgian Express crash	Plane crash	Pelee, Ontario	
10	1923	M.V. Orient	Shipwreck	Strait of Georgia, British Columbia	Split in two by the freighter Admiral Nulton leaving three survivors.
10	1899	Thistle	Shipwreck	Johnstone Strait, British Columbia	
10	2010	Glengarry Hospital Norovirus outbreak	Outbreak	Victoria, British Columbia	
10	1996	Saguenay flood	Flood	Saguenay-Lac-Saint-Jean, Quebec	
10	1979	Loss of the Salintna	Shipwreck	Portland Inlet, British Columbia	
10	1908	Port Hood explosion	Explosion	Port Hood, Nova Scotia	
10	1977	1977 Lantzville bus crash	Traffic Collision	Lantzville, British Columbia	
10	1975	1975 GO train bus collision	Train collision (Level crossing crash)	Toronto, Ontario	A GO train collided with a bus killing 10 people and injuring 20 others
10	1919	Port Colborne explosion	Explosion (grain elevator)	Port Colborne Ontario	
10	1944	1944 Moose Hall fire	Fire (Arson)	Hamilton, Ontario	On May 24, 1944, an arsonist set fire to the Moose Hall in Hamilton killing 10 people and injuring 47 others.

== See also ==
- List of deadliest Canadian traffic accidents
- List of disasters in Canada
- Volcanism of Canada
