= List of disasters in Canada =

This list of disasters in Canada includes major disasters, either man-made or natural, that occurred in Canada as currently defined or in adjacent waters. Disasters include natural disasters (major fires and floods) and accidental human disasters such as those relating to transportation, industrial and mining activities, and health (epidemics and pandemics).

== List ==
Colonial period
Date	Disaster	Type	Location (modern name)	Region	Deaths	Notes	Ref(s)
1689 August 5	Lachine massacre	Massacre	Lachine, District of Montreal, Canada, New France (Lachine, Quebec)	Central Canada	253		
1700 January 26	Cascadia earthquake	Earthquake	British Columbia	West Coast	likely many but total unknown	M_{w} 8.7 – 9.2 megathrust earthquake along the Cascadia subduction zone	
1700	Eruption of Tseax Cone	Volcanic eruption	Tseax Cone, British Columbia	West Coast	2000	One of Canada's worst known geophysical disasters	
1711 October 7	HMS Feversham	Shipwreck	Scatarie Island, Colony of Acadia, New France (Scatarie Island, Nova Scotia)	Maritimes	90		
1732 September 16	Montreal earthquake	Earthquake	District of Montreal, Canada, New France (Montreal-region, Quebec)	Central Canada	1 (possibly more)	300 damaged houses, as well as 185 buildings destroyed by fire following the earthquake	
1775 September 9	Newfoundland hurricane	Hurricane	Colony of Newfoundland (Newfoundland and Labrador)	Atlantic Canada	c. 4,000		
1782 September 17	Central Atlantic hurricane	Hurricane	Grand Banks of Newfoundland	Atlantic Canada	c. 3,500		
1782 September 17	Central Atlantic hurricane	Hurricane	Grand Banks of Newfoundland	Atlantic Canada	c. 3,500		
1794 July	Boston schooner Resolution	Ship capture and Massacre	Haida Gwaii (formerly Queen Charlotte Islands)	West Coast	11		
1798 Spring	Fort Edmonton Prairie Fire	Wild fire	Edmonton	Prairies	8	Eight Natives died in ten-day fire	
1805 October 23	Aeneas	Shipwreck	Isle aux Morts, Colony of Newfoundland (Isle aux Morts, Newfoundland and Labrador)	Atlantic Canada	340		
1815 April 30	HMS Penelope	Shipwreck	Cap-des-Rosiers, Lower Canada, British North America (Cap-des-Rosiers, Quebec)	Central Canada	40+		
1825 October 7	Miramichi Fire	Fire	Miramichi, New Brunswick, British North America (Miramichi, New Brunswick)	Maritimes	160		
1828 April 14	HMS Acorn	Shipwreck	Halifax, Nova Scotia	Maritimes	115		
1828 July 10	Despatch	Shipwreck	Isle aux Morts, Colony of Newfoundland (Isle aux Morts, Newfoundland and Labrador)	Atlantic Canada	59		
1834 September 11	Sybelle	Shipwreck	St. Paul Island, Nova Scotia	Maritimes	316		
1854 October 27	Jeannette's Creek train wreck	Train wreck	Jeannettes Creek, Canada West, Province of Canada, British North America (Jeannettes Creek, Ontario)	Central Canada	52		
1857 March 12	Desjardins Canal disaster	Train wreck	Hamilton, Canada West, Province of Canada, British North America (Hamilton, Ontario)	Central Canada	59		
1857 June 26	SS Montreal	Shipwreck	Quebec City, Canada East, Province of Canada, British North America (Quebec City, Quebec)	Central Canada	253		
1860 February 19	SS Hungarian	Shipwreck	Cape Sable Island, Nova Scotia	Maritimes	205		
1862	1862 Pacific Northwest smallpox epidemic	epidemic	West Coast	West Coast	c. 20,000		
1863 April 27	SS Anglo Saxon	Shipwreck	Cape Race, Colony of Newfoundland (Cape Race, Newfoundland and Labrador)	Atlantic Canada	237		
1864 June 29	St-Hilaire train disaster	Train wreck	Mont Saint Hilaire, Canada East, Province of Canada, British North America (Mont-Saint-Hilaire, Quebec)	Central Canada	99		

=== 1867–1916 ===
Early Dominion Period
Date	Disaster	Type	Location (modern name)	Region	Deaths	Notes	Ref(s)
1873 April 1	SS Atlantic	Shipwreck	Lower Prospect, Nova Scotia	Maritimes	535		
1873 May 13	Drummond Mine explosion	Mining explosion	Westville, Nova Scotia	Maritimes	60–70	Considered Canada's first mining disaster	
1877 April 29	Oil Cabinet Novelty Works Company fire	Fire	Montreal, Quebec	Central Canada	12		
1877 June 20	Great Fire of Saint John	Fire	Saint John, New Brunswick	Maritimes	18-19		
1880 November 12	Foord Pit explosion	Mining explosion	Stellarton, Nova Scotia	Maritimes	44		
1881 May 24	Victoria steamboat disaster	Shipwreck	Thames River, Ontario	Central Canada	182 (approx.)		
1885 February 10	Vale Colliery explosion	Mining explosion	near Stellarton, Nova Scotia	Maritimes	13		
1886 June 13	Vancouver fire	Fire	Vancouver, BC	West Coast	8		
1896 October 15	Calgary fire in centre of town	Fire	Calgary, Alberta	Prairies		Fourteen buildings were destroyed.	
1887	Nanaimo mine explosion	Mining explosion	Nanaimo, British Columbia	West Coast	148		
1889 September 19	Québec rockslide	Geologic collapse	near Quebec City, Quebec	Central Canada	40+		
1890 spring	76 Ranch sheep mass-slaughter	Fire (wildfire)	Gull Lake, Saskatchewan	Prairies		More than a thousand sheep were killed by prairie fire.	
1890 May 16	Saint-Jean-de-Dieu asylum fire	Fire	Montreal, Quebec	Central Canada	86-104		
1892	Princess Opera House	Fire	Winnipeg, Manitoba	Prairies		Nineteen buildings destroyed.	
1892 July 8	The Great Fire of 1892	Fire	St. John's, Newfoundland	Atlantic Canada			
1896 May 26	Point Ellice Bridge disaster	Traffic-rail accident	Victoria, British Columbia	West Coast	55		
1898 February 2	McIntyre Block fire	Fire	Winnipeg, Manitoba	Prairies		Fifty offices, the office of the University of Manitoba and the UofM's Isbister Library were destroyed.	
1899 June 16	Caledonia Mine explosion	Mining explosion	Glace Bay, Nova Scotia	Maritimes	11		
1900 April 26	Great Hull Fire	Fire	Ottawa-Hull, Ontario-Quebec	Central Canada	7	4,000 buildings destroyed in Hull (Québec) and Ottawa (Ontario)	
1901 December ?	Shipwreck	Sinking of British man of war HMS Condor	Off Cape Flattery?	West Coast	104		
1902 May 22	Coal Creek (BC) mine explosion	Mining explosion	Coal Creek, Fernie district, British Columbia	West Coast	128		
1902 December 27	Wanstead train disaster	Train wreck	Wanstead, Ontario (Wanstead, Ontario)	Central Canada	31		
1903 January 14	1903 Hamilton Powder Company explosion	Explosion	Departure Bay, British Columbia	West Coast	12		
1903 April 29	Frank Slide at Turtle Mountain	Geologic collapse	Turtle Mountain, District of Alberta, Northwest Territories (Turtle Mountain, Alberta)	Prairies	70-90+		
1904 November 23	Carbonada coal mine explosion	Mining explosion	Carbonada (outside Fernie)	BC	14		
1904	Fernie Fire of 1904	Fire	Fernie	BC		destroyed whole downtown - 65 buildings lost	
1904 January 8	Clallam (steamboat)	Shipwreck	Oak Bay, BC	West Coast	56		
1906 September 25	Sternwheeler Columbian disaster	Shipwreck	At Eagle Rock on the Yukon River, Yukon	Northern Canada	6		
1906-1907 winter	Winter of 1906-1907	blizzards	southern Alberta, southern Saskatchewan	Prairies		Thousands of cows died in cold, blowing winds and driving snow. Forty-eight cows died right on Calgary's main street.	
1907 February 26	Hochelaga Protestant School fire	Fire	Montreal, Quebec	Central Canada	17		
1907 June 7	Strathcona coal mine fire	Mining fire	Edmonton, Alberta	Prairies	6		
1907 August 29	First Quebec Bridge Collapse	Engineering disaster	Quebec City, Quebec	Central Canada	75		
1908 February 7	Port Hood Mine explosion	Mining explosion	Port Hood, Nova Scotia	Maritimes	10		
1908 August 8	Elk River Bush Fire	Fire (wildfire)	British Columbia (Michel, Hosmer, Sparwood, Fernie)	British Columbia BC	125		
1908 August 13	Fernie destroyed by fire (part of the Elk River Bush Fire)	Fire	Fernie, BC	British Columbia BC	1–100+		
1909 October 5	Wellington Collieries cave-in	Mining disaster	Extension, BC (near Ladysmith)	West Coast	32		
1910 January 21	Spanish River derailment	Train wreck	Nairn and Hyman, Ontario	Central Canada	43-70		
1910 March 4	Rogers Pass avalanche	Avalanche	Rogers Pass, British Columbia	West Coast	62		
1910 June 13	The Herald fire	Fire	Montreal, Quebec	Central Canada	32		
1910 December 9	Bellevue mine disaster	Mining explosion	Bellevue, Alberta	Prairies	30		
1911 July	Great Porcupine fire	Fire (wildfire)	Timmins, Ontario	Central Canada	73 to 200		
1912 April 15	Sinking of the RMS Titanic	Shipwreck	Atlantic Ocean, off the Grand Banks of Newfoundland	Atlantic Canada	1490-1635		
1912 June 30	Regina Cyclone	Tornado	Regina, Saskatchewan	Prairies	28		
1913 November	The Great Lakes Storm of 1913	Meteorological storm	Ontario	Central Canada	250+		
1914 June 19	Hillcrest mine disaster	Mining explosion	Hillcrest, Alberta	Prairies	189	Canada's worst mining disaster	
1914 late March or early April	Southern Cross disaster	ship sinking (likely due to breaking up in storm)	location unknown, in Newfoundland waters	Maritimes	174 (or 173)	Largest death toll in Newfoundland and Labrador's sailing history.	
1914 March 30-April 2	SS Newfoundland	sealing disaster	off northern coast of Newfoundland	Maritimes	78	132 sealers were stranded on an ice floe, resulting in 78 deaths	
1914 May 29	RMS Empress of Ireland collision with Norwegian collier Storstad	Shipwreck	Saint Lawrence River in Quebec	Central Canada	1012		
1915	Britannia Landslide	Geologic collapse	Britannia Mine, British Columbia	West Coast	50–60		
1916 February 3	Burning of Parliament Buildings	Fire	Ottawa, Ontario	Central Canada			
1916 July	Matheson Fire	Fire	Northeastern Ontario	Central Canada	223 (approx.)		
1916 August 11	Michel Colliery (Fernie district) explosion	Mining explosion	Fernie district, British Columbia	British Columbia	13		
1916	Second Quebec Bridge Collapse	Engineering disaster	Quebec City, Quebec	Central Canada	13		

=== 1917–1969 ===
Pre-Centennial Period
Date	Disaster	Type	Location	Region	Deaths	Notes	Ref(s)
1917 April 5	Coal Creek mine explosion	Mining disaster	Coal Creek (Fernie, BC)	British Columbia	34		
1917 July 25	Dominion No. 12 Colliery explosion	Mining disaster	New Waterford, Nova Scotia	Maritimes	65		
1917 December 6	Halifax Explosion	Explosion (ship collision, fire, explosion)	Halifax, Nova Scotia	Maritimes	1782	World War I	
1918 January 23	Allan Mine explosion	Mining disaster	Stellarton, Nova Scotia	Maritimes	88		
1918 February 14	Grey Nuns Motherhouse fire	Fire	Montreal, Quebec	Central Canada	53+	most of victims were children	
1918 February 24	Sinking of SS Florizel	Shipwreck	near Cappahayden, Newfoundland	Atlantic Canada	94		
1918 March 15	Alvin Siding camp fire	Fire	Alvin Siding, Colchester County, Nova Scotia	Maritimes	22		
1918 September 10	Protection Island mining disaster	Mining disaster (elevator malfunction)	Nanaimo, BC	West Coast	16	Nanaimo elevator cable snaps	
1918 October 25	Sinking of SS Princess Sophia	Shipwreck	near Juneau, Alaska	West Coast	364		
1918 September - 1919	Spanish flu epidemic	Epidemic	world wide	National - all regions	c. 50,000 (Canada)	Labrador hard hit - killed close to one third of Labrador's Inuit population and entirely wiped out the Inuit village of Okak	
1919 August 10	Dominion Park's Mystic Rill fire	Fire	Montreal, Quebec	Central Canada	8		
1921 October 28	1921 Britannia Beach flood	Flood	Britannia Creek, BC	West Coast	37	Debris flood torrent kills 37 people in Britannia Beach	
1922 October 4 and 5	The Great Fire	Fire	Timsikaming District, Ontario	Central Canada	11		
1925 February 2	Charlevoix–Kamouraska earthquake	Earthquake	Charlevoix-region, Quebec	Central Canada			
1927 January 9	Laurier Palace Theatre fire	Fire	Montreal, Quebec	Central Canada	78		
1927 September 19	Beauval Indian Residential School fire	Fire	Beauval, Saskatchewan	Prairies	20		
1929 November 18	Grand Banks earthquake and tsunami	Tsunami and earthquake	Burin Peninsula, Newfoundland	Atlantic Canada	27-28		
1931 March 15	Explosion of SS Viking	Shipwreck/Explosion	near Horse Islands, Newfoundland	Atlantic Canada	27	Worst disaster in history of the film industry.	
1932 June 17	Cymbeline explosion	Explosion (ship)	Montreal, Quebec	Central Canada	30	Oil tanker explosion	
1935 December 9	Coalhurst (Alberta) coal mine disaster	Mining explosion	Coalhurst, Alberta (about 15 kilometres north of Lethbridge)	Prairies	16	coal mine explosion	
1938 December 6	Princess Pit rake disaster	Mining disaster (miner conveyance malfunction)	Sydney Mines, Nova Scotia	Maritimes	21		
1942 February 18	Pollux-Truxtun Disaster	Shipwrecks (double shipwrecks)	Burin Peninsula, Newfoundland	Atlantic Canada	203	Sinkings of USS Pollux and USS Truxtun	
1942 December 12	Knights of Columbus Hostel fire	Fire (Arson)	St John's, Newfoundland	Atlantic Canada	99		
1942 December 27	Almonte train disaster	Train collision	Almonte, Ontario	Central Canada			
1943 February 13	Explosion in downtown Dawson Creek	Explosion (stored dynamite)	Dawson Creek, BC	West Coast	21	World War II Alaska Highway project	
1943 April 17	FV Flora Alberta collision	Shipwreck	140 kilometers southeast of Halifax, Nova Scotia	Maritimes	21		
1944 April 25	1944 Montreal RAF Liberator VI crash	Aircrash	Montreal, Quebec	Central Canada	15		
1945 March 6	S.S. Green Hill Park explosion	Explosion (ship)	Vancouver, BC	West Coast	8		
1946 June 23	Vancouver Island earthquake	Earthquake	Vancouver Island, BC	West Coast	2		
1946 September 18	1946 SABENA DC-4 crash	Aircrash	near Gander, Newfoundland	Atlantic Canada	27		
1949 September 9	Canadian Pacific Air Lines Flight 108	Aircrash/Bombing	near Sault-au-Cochon, Quebec	Central Canada	23		
1949 September 17	SS Noronic fire	Fire/shipwreck	Toronto, Ontario	Central Canada	118+		
1950	1950 Red River flood	Flood	Manitoba	Prairies	3		
1951 June 15	Hospice Sainte-Cunégonde fire	Fire	Montreal, Quebec	Central Canada	35		
1952 January 14	McGregor Mine explosion	Mining explosion	Stellarton, Nova Scotia	Maritimes	19		
1952 July 9	No. 20 Colliery explosion	Mining explosion	Glace Bay, Nova Scotia	Maritimes	7		
1954 April 8	Trans-Canada Air Lines Flight 9	Aircrash (Mid-air collision)	Moose Jaw, Saskatchewan	Prairies	37		
1954	Hurricane Hazel	Hurricane	Ontario	Central Canada	81		
1956 May 15	Villa St. Louis disaster	Aircrash	Ontario	Central Canada	15		
1956 December 9	Trans-Canada Air Lines Flight 810	Aircrash	British Columbia	West Coast	62		
1957 August 11	Maritime Central Airways Flight 315	Aircrash	near Notre-Dame-du-Sacré-Cœur-d'Issoudun, Quebec	Central Canada	79		
1958 June 17	Ironworkers Memorial Second Narrows Crossing collapse	Engineering disaster	Vancouver, BC	West Coast	18		
1958 October 23	Springhill mining disaster	Mine bump	Springhill, Nova Scotia	Maritimes	75		
1959 June 20	Escuminac disaster	Hurricane	New Brunswick	Maritimes	35		
1963 August 1	1963 Hanmer explosion	Explosion (fuel truck/gas station)	Hanmer, Ontario	Central Canada	8		
1963 November 29	Trans-Canada Air Lines Flight 831	Aircrash	Sainte-Thérèse-de-Blainville, Quebec	Central Canada	118		
1964 March 27	Port Alberni Tsunami	Tsunami	Port Alberni, BC	West Coast	0 (killing about 119 in Alaska and mainland U.S.)	Two tsunamis (one two-metres tall, the second four-metres tall) destroyed 58 homes, causing $10M in property loss.	
1965 January 9	Hope Slide	Geologic collapse	Hope, BC	West Coast	4		
1965 February 18	Granduc avalanche	Snow slide	Granduc, BC (copper-mining camp near Stewart)	West Coast	26		
1965 March 1	LaSalle Heights disaster	Explosion (gas-line)	LaSalle, Quebec	Central Canada	28		
1965 July 8	Canadian Pacific Air Lines Flight 21	Aircrash/Bombing	near 100 Mile House, British Columbia	West Coast	52		
1966 October 7	Dorion level crossing accident	Train collision/bus collision	Dorion, Quebec	Central Canada	19		
1967 April 17-20 and 1967 April 27-29	1967 Southern Alberta blizzard	Blizzard	Southern Alberta	Prairies	0	Most-devastating blizzard ever recorded in Alberta, dropping 175 cm of snow and resulting in the death of thousands of cattle.	
1968 May 8	Wegner Point disaster	Military training disaster	Petawawa, Ontario	Central Canada	7		
1969 January 2	1969 Montreal fire	Fire	Montreal, Quebec	Central Canada	7		
1969 December 2	1969 Notre-Dame-Du-Lac Nursing Home Fire	Fire	Notre-Dame-du-Lac, Quebec	Central Canada	38		

=== 1970–2016 ===
Post-Centennial Period
Date	Disaster	Type	Location	Region	Deaths	Notes	Ref(s)
1970 July 5	Air Canada Flight 621	Aircrash	Ontario	Central Canada	109		
1971 May 4	Saint-Jean-Vianney landslide	Geologic collapse	Saint-Jean-Vianney, Quebec	Central Canada	31		
1972 September 1	Blue Bird Café fire	Arson	Montreal, Quebec	Central Canada	37		
1975 January 21	Gargantua bar attack	Arson	Montreal, Quebec	Central Canada	13		
1975 November 10	SS Edmund Fitzgerald Wreck	Wreck	Lake Superior, Ontario	Maritimes	29		
1976 December 26	Chafe's Nursing Home fire	Fire	Goulds, Newfoundland and Labrador	Maritimes	20		
1977 June 21	Saint John city hall fire	Fire	Saint John, New Brunswick	Maritimes	21		
1978 February 11	Pacific Western Airlines Flight 314	Aircrash	Cranbrook, British Columbia	West Coast	43		
1978 July 15	Saint John house fire	Fire	Saint John, New Brunswick	Maritimes	7		
1978 August 4	Eastman Bus Crash	Traffic accident	Eastman, Quebec	Central Canada	40	Second deadliest traffic accident in Canadian history	
1979 February 24	No. 26 Colliery explosion	Mining disaster	Glace Bay, Nova Scotia	Maritimes	12		
1979 November 10	Mississauga train derailment	Train disaster	Mississauga, Ontario	Central Canada	0		
1980 January 1	Opemiska Community Hall fire	Fire	Chapais, Quebec	Central Canada	48		
1980 May 28	CP Rail crew bus crash	Traffic accident	Webb, Saskatchewan	Prairies	22		
1980 July 14	1980 Mississauga nursing home fire	Fire	Mississauga, Ontario	Central Canada	25		
1982 February 15	Ocean Ranger sinking	Shipwreck	Grand Banks of Newfoundland	Atlantic Canada	84		
1985 May 31	1985 United States–Canada tornado outbreak	Tornado outbreak	Southern Ontario	Central Canada			
1985 December 12	Arrow Air Flight 1285	Aircrash	Gander, Newfoundland	Atlantic Canada	256		
1986 February 8	Hinton train collision	Train disaster	Alberta	Prairies	23		
1986 June 14	Mindbender crash	Roller Coaster Crash	Galaxyland, West Edmonton Mall, Edmonton, Alberta	Prairies	3		
1987 July 31	Edmonton Tornado	Tornado	Edmonton, Alberta	Prairies	27		
1988 April 22	Fredericton house arson	Arson	Fredericton, New Brunswick	Maritimes	4		
1989 May–September	1989 Manitoba wildfires	Fire (Wildfires)	Manitoba, Saskatchewan and Ontario	Prairies, Central Canada			
1989 October 8	Cormier Village hayride accident	Traffic accident	New Brunswick	Atlantic Canada	13		
1989 December 6	École Polytechnique massacre	School shooting	Montreal, Quebec	Central Canada	15		
1989 December 23	Rupert Hotel fire	Arson	Toronto, Ontario	Central Canada	10		
1991 July 23	Nunavut canoe disaster	Capsizing	Hall Beach, Nunavut	Northern Canada	7(?)	On July 23, 1991, a canoe capsized near Hall Beach, Northwest Territories (now Nunavut). One person survived, and seven others were left missing, presumably drowned.	
1992 May 9	Westray Mine disaster	Mining explosion	Plymouth, Nova Scotia	Atlantic Canada	26		
1992 August 24	Concordia University massacre	School shooting	Montreal, Quebec	Central Canada	4		
1996 July 19–20	Saguenay flood	Flood	Saguenay-region, Quebec	Central Canada	10		
1997 April	Red River flood of 1997 (Red Sea Flood)	Flood	Manitoba	Prairies	0		
1997	2nd Les Éboulements bus accident	Traffic accident	Quebec	Central Canada	44	Deadliest traffic accident in Canadian history	
1998 January 5–9	Great Ice Storm of 1998	Meteorological storm	Ontario, Quebec, and New Brunswick	Eastern Canada	28	Massive ice storm hits Quebec, Ontario and New Brunswick	
1998 September 2	Swissair Flight 111	Aircrash	Peggys Cove, Nova Scotia	Atlantic Canada	229		
1999 September 3	87-vehicle pileup on Highway 401 near Windsor, Ontario	Traffic accident	Windsor, Ontario	Central Canada	8		
2000 May	Walkerton Tragedy	Civic works failure - e. coli outbreak in public water system	Walkerton, Ontario	Central Canada	7		
2000 July 14	Pine Lake tornado	Tornado	Pine Lake, Alberta	Prairies	12		
2003 April 24	2003 Etobicoke gas explosion	Explosion	Etobicoke, Ontario	Central Canada	7		
2003 September 29	Hurricane Juan	Hurricane	Halifax-area, Nova Scotia	Atlantic Canada	8		
2006 April 8	Shedden massacre	Massacre	Shedden, Elgin County, Ontario	Central Canada	8		
2006 September 13	2006 Dawson College shooting	School shooting	Montréal, Quebec	Central Canada	2		
2006 September 30	De la Concorde overpass collapse	Engineering disaster	Laval, Quebec	Central Canada	5		
2007 June 22	2007 Elie tornado	Tornado	Elie, Manitoba	Prairies	0	The only recorded F5/EF5 tornado in the history of Canada, costing around $50 million and having a maximum windspeed between 420 km/h to 510 km/h	
2008 January 12	2008 Bathurst Boys in Red accident	Traffic accident	Bathurst, New Brunswick	Atlantic Canada	8		
2008 August 10	Toronto propane explosion	Explosion	Downsview, Ontario	Ontario Canada	2		
2009 March 12	Cougar Helicopters Flight 91	Air crash	Off Newfoundland	Atlantic Canada	17		
2011 June	2011 Assiniboine River flood	Flood	Manitoba	Prairies	1		
2011 May 15	Slave Lake fire	Fire (Wildfires)	Slave Lake, Alberta	Prairies	1		
2011 August 20	First Air Flight 6560	Aircrash	near Resolute, Nunavut	Northern Canada	12		
2011 August 21	Goderich Tornado	Tornado	Goderich, Ontario	Central Canada	1		
2012 February 26	Burlington derailment	Train disaster	Burlington, Ontario	Central Canada	3		
2012 May 12	two-plane collision	Aircrash (Mid-air collision)	near St. Brieux, Saskatchewan	Prairies	5 (two pilots, three passengers		
2013 June 20 – July 12	2013 Alberta floods	Flood	southwest Alberta around Calgary Region	Prairies	5		
2013 July 6	Lac-Mégantic rail disaster	Train disaster	Lac-Mégantic, Quebec	Central Canada	47		
2013 September 18	Ottawa bus–train crash	Train-bus collision	Ottawa, Ontario	Central Canada	6		
January-March 2014	North American cold wave	Winter cold	Ontario	Central Canada			
2014 January 23	L'Isle-Verte nursing home fire	Fire	L'Isle-Verte, Quebec	Central Canada	32		
2014 October 22	Ottawa Parliament shooting	Terrorism	Ottawa, Ontario	Central Canada	2		
2015 July	La Ronge wildfire	Fire (Wildfires)	La Ronge, Saskatchewan	Prairies		13,000 people evacuated	
2016 January 22	La Loche shootings	Spree shooting	La Loche, Saskatchewan	Prairies	5		
2016 March 29	2016 Magdalen Islands Mitsubishi MU-2 crash	Aircrash	Les Îles-de-la-Madeleine, Magdalen Islands, Quebec	Atlantic Canada	7		
2016 May 1 – June 14	2016 Fort McMurray Wildfire	Fire (Wildfire)	Fort McMurray, Alberta	Prairies	2	90,000 people evacuated	

=== 2017–2023 ===
Pre-Bicentennial Period
Date	Disaster	Type	Location	Region	Deaths	Injured	Notes	Ref(s)
2017 January 29	Quebec City mosque shooting	Mass shooting	Quebec City, Quebec	Central Canada	6	5		
2017 April 5 – May	2017 Quebec floods	Flood	Quebec	Quebec	2	Unknown		
2017 July 6 – September 15	2017 British Columbia wildfires	Wildfires	British Columbia	West Coast	0	Unknown	Provincial state of emergency declared	
2017 September 30	2017 Edmonton attack	Terrorism	Edmonton, Alberta	Prairies	0	5		
2018 April 6	Humboldt Broncos bus crash	Bus crash	near Tisdale, Saskatchewan	Prairies	16	13		
2018 April 23	Toronto van attack	Vehicle-ramming attack	North York City Centre, North York, Toronto, Ontario	Central Canada	10	16		
2018 July 1 – July 5	2018 Eastern Canada heat wave	Heat wave	Eastern Canada	Eastern Canada	54 (approx.)	Unknown		
2018 July 9–10	2018 Saskatchewan Tornado Outbreak	Tornado Outbreak	Southern Saskatchewan	Prairies	0	Unknown	11 confirmed tornadoes, the highest of which being rated EF2	
2018 July 22	2018 Toronto shooting	Mass shooting	Toronto, Ontario	Central Canada	3	0		
2018 August 3	2018 Alonsa EF4 Tornado	Tornado	Alonsa, Manitoba	Prairies	1		The only EF4+ rated tornado for 2018 in both Canada and the United States	
2018 August 15 –	2018 British Columbia wildfires	Wildfires	British Columbia	West Coast	Unknown	Unknown	Provincial state of emergency declared	
2018 September 21	2018 United States–Canada tornado outbreak	Tornadoes	Dunrobin, Ontario, Ottawa, Ontario, Gatineau, Quebec	Eastern Canada	0	31	~$300 million damage	
2019 March 1–2019 December 23	2019 Alberta wildfires	Wildfires	North and Central Alberta	Prairies	0	Unknown	A series of around 1,000 wildfires took place mostly across Northern Alberta burning over 883,000 hectares of forest. The most prominent of the fires being the ones affecting High Level.	
2019 May – 2019 August	2019 Quebec, Ontario and New Brunswick floods	Flood	Quebec, Ontario, New Brunswick	Eastern and Central Canada	1			
2020 January 15 – present	COVID-19 pandemic	Pandemic	Canada	National	53,086 (as of 25 July 2023)			
2020 April 18 – 19	2020 Nova Scotia attacks	Mass shooting, arson	Nova Scotia	Eastern Canada	23	3		
2020 May 17	Canadian Forces Snowbirds jet crash	Aircrash	Kamloops, British Columbia	West Coast	1	1		
2021 June 15–2021 August 16	2021 British Columbia wildfires	Wildfires	Interior British Columbia	West Coast	2	Unknown		
2021 June 25 – 2021 July 7	Western Canada Heatwave	Heat wave	Western Canada	Prairies and West Coast	685		Deadliest weather event in the history of Canada	
2021 June 30	Lytton wildfire	Wildfire	Lytton, British Columbia	West Coast	2	Several	Over 90% of Lytton destroyed	
2021 November 14	British Columbia Floods	Floods	lower half of British Columbia	West Coast	4	at least 10	Provincial state of emergency declared	
2022 January 13	2022 Ottawa Eastway tank explosion	Fire	Ottawa, Ontario	Eastern and Central Canada	6	2	Industrial explosion	
2022 September 23–24	Hurricane Fiona	Hurricane	Atlantic Canada	Eastern Canada	3		$660 million in insured damage making Fiona the most costly storm to hit Canada	
2023 February 13	2023 East Ottawa explosion	Explosion (due to construction site gas leak)	Ottawa, Ontario	Eastern Canada	0	12		
2023 March 1 - October 6	2023 Canadian wildfires	Wildfires	Alberta, British Columbia, the Northwest Territories, Nova Scotia, Ontario, Quebec	National - all regions	8	Unknown		
2023 March 1 - present	2023 Alberta wildfires	Wildfires	North and Central Alberta	Prairies	Unknown	Unknown	Series of more than 750 wildfires across the province of Alberta. In that fire season, the province recorded 1088 fires that burned a total of 2,222,900 hectares (5,492,906 acres).	
2023 March 30	2023 St. Lawrence River River boat disaster	Capsizing	Akwesasne, Quebec	Eastern Canada	8			
2023 May 28 - present	Nova Scotia wildfires	Wildfires	Tantallon, Shelburne, Barrington and Bedford, Nova Scotia	Eastern Canada	0	2	16,000 people evacuated; Shelburne County wildfire amongst largest ever seen in the province.	
2023 June 14	Southern Alberta June 2023 Tornado Outbreak	Tornado Outbreak	Near Lethbridge and Brooks	Prairies	0	0	At least 10 tornadoes were reported across the southeastern portion of Alberta	
2023 June 15	Carberry bus crash	Vehicle collision	Near Carberry, Manitoba	Prairies	17	8		
2023 July 21-22	2023 Nova Scotia floods	Flood	Nova Scotia	Eastern Canada	4		Estimated $200 million in damages	
2023 July 28	2023 Alberta Piper PA-32R crash	Aircraft accident	Near Kananaskis Village, Alberta	Prairies	6	0		

=== 2024–present ===
Date	Disaster	Type	Location	Region	Deaths	Injured	Notes	Ref(s)
2024 January 23	Northwestern Air Flight 738	Aircraft accident	Fort Smith, NWT	North	6	1	Only 1 person on board the aircraft survived.	
2024 July 22-September 7	2024 Jasper wildfire	Wildfire	Jasper National Park, Alberta	Prairies	1	0	32% of the Town of Jasper was destroyed. 25,000 residents were evacuated.	
2025 February 17	Delta Connection Flight 4819	Aircraft accident	Mississauga, Ontario	Central	0	21		
2025 May–ongoing	2025 Canadian wildfires	Wildfires	Manitoba, Ontario, Saskatchewan, Alberta, Quebec, Newfoundland and Labrador, New Brunswick, Nova Scotia	National - all regions	2	1	Destroyed 631 structures, caused 85,000 evacuations and destroyed over 8.78 million ha (21.7 million acres) of land.	
2025 June 19–22	Tornado outbreak and derecho of June 19–22, 2025	Tornado outbreak and derecho	Saskatchewan and Ontario	Southern	1	4	Caused widespread damage.	
2026 February 10	2026 Tumbler Ridge shooting	School Shooting	Tumbler Ridge, British Columbia	West Coast Mountains	10	27		
2026 July 11	2026 Salsa Festival & St Clair shooting	Mass shooting	Toronto, Ontario	Central	2	6	Two groups exchanged gunfire at a festival in Toronto, police responded rapidly— 13,000 people were attending.	

== See also ==
- List of disasters in Canada by death toll
- List of pipeline accidents in Canada
- List of fires in Canada
- List of shipwrecks of Canada
- List of massacres in Canada
