= List of deadliest Canadian traffic accidents =

A list of Canadian traffic accidents, with multiple fatalities. The list includes notable accidents with at least five fatalities.

Accident	Date	Location	Killed	Description	Ref.
Les Éboulements bus accident	13 October 1997	Les Éboulements, Quebec	44	Canada's deadliest traffic accident occurred in Les Eboulements, Quebec, after a bus transporting a group of seniors suffered brake failure and careened down an embankment into a ravine, killing 43 on board including the driver. Fatigue and maintenance were found to be contributing factors in the crash.	
Eastman bus crash	4 August 1978	Eastman, Quebec	40	A bus carrying physically and mentally handicapped people, plus volunteers, suffered brake failure while coming down a steep hill and plunged into Lac d’Argent in Eastman, Quebec, killing 40 on board. The group had been out for a night at the theatre and was returning when the tragedy occurred. The bus floated for approximately 15 minutes before sinking. Only seven passengers survived.	
CP Rail crew bus crash	28 May 1980	Webb, Saskatchewan	22	Saskatchewan's deadliest traffic accident occurred when 22 workers on a Canadian Pacific Railway steel crew were killed after their bus collided with another vehicle on the Trans-Canada Highway west of Regina. The bus flipped onto its side and was then struck from behind by a tanker truck loaded with liquid asphalt.	
Dorion level crossing accident	7 October 1966	Vaudreuil-Dorion, Quebec	21	A school bus transporting children to a school dance was hit by a CN Rail freight train in Vaudreuil-Dorion, Quebec, killing 19 instantly with two dying later from injuries.	
Colonial Coach Lines bus accident	31 July 1953	Morrisburg, Ontario	20	Ontario's deadliest traffic accident occurred when 20 people were killed after their Colonial Coach Lines passenger bus collided with a truck parked on the side of Highway 2 near Morrisburg, Ontario. The bus careened off the highway and into the Williamsburg canal system. Seventeen survivors escaped from the bus as it sank in about six metres of water.	
Accident at Lac-Bouchette	17 July 1993	Lac-Bouchette, Quebec	19	A minibus carrying senior citizens from Verchères, Quebec and Contrecoeur, Quebec were returning from a pilgrimage to the shrine of le Ermitage Saint-Antoine near La Bouchette when the minibus they were travelling in collided with a van, killing 19 people.	
Chipman-Lamont school bus-train collision	29 November 1960	Chipman, Alberta	17	Alberta's deadliest traffic accident occurred when 17 high schoolers from the town of Chipman, Alberta were killed after their school bus was hit by a train near Lamont, Alberta. An additional 25 people were injured.	
Carberry highway collision	15 June 2023	North Cypress-Langford, Manitoba	17	Manitoba's deadliest traffic accident occurred during a vehicle collision between a handi-transit bus and a semi-truck on the Trans-Canada Highway in the Municipality of North Cypress – Langford near Carberry, Manitoba, Canada, killing 17 seniors and injuring 8 others.	
Humboldt Broncos bus crash	6 April 2018	Armley, Saskatchewan	16	Sixteen members of the Humboldt Broncos, a Saskatchewan junior hockey team, died when their team bus was struck on the side by a transport truck while crossing an intersection near Armley, Saskatchewan, Canada. The dead included the driver of the bus, 10 players, as well as coaches and other team assistants.	
Yamachiche bus collision	30 January 1954	Yamachiche, Quebec	14	Fourteen people were killed on the highway at Yamachiche, Quebec, near Trois-Rivières, when their bus collided with an oncoming transport truck. A few of the passengers, as well as the drivers of both vehicles, managed to escape the inferno that engulfed the vehicles after the crash.	
Les Eboulements bus crash	2 June 1974	Les Eboulements, Quebec	13	Thirteen seniors were killed when the bus they were travelling in lost control and crashed down and embankment in Les Eboulements, Quebec, eerily similar to the 1997 Les Éboulements Bus Accident 23 years later at the same location.	
Cormier-Village hayride accident	8 October 1989	Cormier Village, New Brunswick	13	New Brunswick's deadliest traffic accident occurred when 13 people died and 45 others were injured during a family reunion hayride near Cormier Village, New Brunswick, northeast of Moncton. The victims were sitting in a hay wagon pulled by a tractor, when a passing logging truck lost control on the road, and its load of logs crashed down onto the wagon. Five children were among the victims.	
Sainte-Rosalie bus crash	9 June 1979	Sainte-Rosalie, Quebec	11	A bus carrying seniors lost control during a rainstorm and crashed into an overpass near Sainte-Rosalie, Quebec, killing 11 seniors and injuring another 20.	
Hampstead crash	6 February 2012	Hampstead, Ontario	11	Eleven people were killed in Hampstead, Ontario, west of Kitchener, when a flatbed truck struck a minivan filled with migrant workers from a nearby poultry farm. The drivers of both vehicles died, as well as nine farm workers.	
Go Train/TTC bus crash	12 December 1975	Scarborough, Ontario	10	A GO Transit train slammed into a Toronto Transit Commission (TTC) bus containing 50 passengers, including the driver, after the bus stalled at a level crossing at St. Clair Avenue and Kennedy Road in Scarborough, killing 10 and injuring a further 20.	
Lantzville bus crash	3 September 1977	Lantzville, British Columbia	10	British Columbia's deadliest traffic accident occurred on Labour Day weekend, when a three-vehicle accident involving two trucks and a bus occurred near Lantzville, BC, resulting in the death of 10 individuals.	
Oldcastle school bus accident	21 December 1966	Oldcastle, Ontario	8	A 35-tonne dump truck carrying a load of sand overturned at an intersection onto a school bus full of children near Oldcastle, ON. Tragically, eight children between the ages of six and nine lost their lives, and a further 16 others sustained injuries.	
Caledon Mother's Day Crash	9 May 1993	Caledon, Ontario	8	A two-car collision on the Fork's of the Credit Road, resulting in the deaths of eight people, aged 16–21.	
Ontario Highway 401 crash	3 September 1999	Tilbury, Ontario	8	A multiple-vehicle collision resulting from dense fog conditions on a section of Ontario Highway 401 between Windsor and Tilbury. There were 87 vehicles involved in the pile-up in both directions of the divided highway, killing eight people with another 45 injured.	
La tragédie de Saint-Jean-Baptiste-de-Nicolet	16 March 2000	Nicolet, Quebec	8	A van carrying 10 daycare children collided with another vehicle near Nicolet, QC, after losing control on some black ice. Eight children were killed in the accident.	
Bathurst boys in red accident	12 January 2008	Bathurst, New Brunswick	8	A semi-trailer truck and a van carrying the basketball team from Bathurst High School collided, which killed seven students, the wife of the coach, and injured four other occupants in the van.	
Highway 97 collision	March 1988	Prince George, British Columbia	6	A principal and five student basketball players were killed when the vehicle they were travelling in swerved into the oncoming lane and struck a flatbed truck carrying power line poles, just north of Prince George, British Columbia.	
Armley Corner collision	June 1997	Armley, Saskatchewan	6	A family of six were killed when the vehicle they were travelling in collided with a transport truck at the intersection of highway 35 and 335 near Armley, Saskatchewan, the same intersection the Humboldt Broncos bus crash would take place 21 years later.	
Rogers Pass crash	27 November 2000	Revelstoke, British Columbia	6	A bus carrying tourists from Taiwan crashed head-on with a transport truck in a tunnel on the Trans-Canada Highway, near Revelstoke, BC, killing six and injuring 21. The accident happened in the 316-metre Lanark Snowshed Tunnel, closing the highway for about 14 hours. The transport truck was empty at the time of the accident.	
Lloydminster collision	27 July 2013	Lloydminster, Saskatchewan	6	Six teenagers aged 14–17 were killed following a collision with a tanker truck at an intersection in Lloydminster, Saskatchewan.	
OC Transpo Bus-train crash	8 September 2013	Ottawa, Ontario	6	Six people were killed after a collision occurred between an OC Transpo double-decker bus and a Via Rail train in the Ottawa suburb of Barrhaven.	
Elrose collision	29 June 2018	Elrose, Saskatchewan	6	Six people, including three children were killed when two vehicles collided on Highway 4, north of Elrose, Saskatchewan.	
Sunwapta Falls collision	8 August 2018	Sunwapta Falls, Alberta	6	Six people were killed following a head-on crash near Jasper, Alberta, on Highway 93, south of Sunwapta Falls, however a two-year-old child survived the crash uninjured.	
Barrie crash	27 August 2022	Barrie, Ontario	6	Six young adults were killed in Barrie, Ontario, when the vehicle they were travelling in crashed into a large, deep concrete pit that had been dug out along the stretch of McKay Road under construction.	
Embrun Highway 417 pileup	17 February 2006	Embrun, Ontario	5	A multiple-vehicle collision involving 38 vehicles occurred during a snow squall in whiteout conditions on Highway 417 near Embrun, Ontario, resulting in 5 dead and many others injured.	
De la Concorde overpass collapse	30 September 2006	Laval, Quebec	5	A 65 ft (20 m) section of a three-lane overpass over Autoroute 19, in Laval, Quebec, collapsed, crushing two vehicles under it, killing five people and seriously injuring six others who went over the edge while travelling on the overpass.	
Berthierville bus crash	9 February 2011	Berthierville, Quebec	5	Five poultry farm workers were killed at the intersection of Highway 158 and 345 in Berthierville, Quebec, after their van collided with a school bus carrying 12 children. None of the children were injured.	
Pacific Highway collision	28 April 2013	Surrey, BC	5	Three generations of the same family were killed when the vehicle they were travelling in on the Pacific Highway was struck by a van at an intersection just north of the US border. A mother, her two children, their aunt and their grandmother were among the 5 killed.	
Highway 401 collision	12 March 2022	Belleville, Ontario	5	Five students from India were killed when a transport truck collided with the van they were travelling in, after it had come to a stop on the side of the 401 highway, just outside of Belleville, Ontario.	
Highway 88 collision	19 March 2023	Northern Sunrise County, Alberta	5	Five people were killed in a crash in Northern Alberta after a truck and van collided on Highway 88 in Northern Sunrise County. Both occupants of the truck were killed as well as three members of the Whitefish Lake First Nation who were travelling in the van.	
Highway 83 crash	31 September 2023	Swan River, Manitoba	5	Five people aged 25 to 42 died after the vehicle they were travelling in crashed on Highway 83, just South of Swan River, Manitoba. RCMP state that all 5 occupants were not wearing seatbelts and were ejected from the vehicle. All five occupants were pronounced dead on scene.	
Huntsville collision	25 November 2023	Huntsville, Ontario	5	Four Chinese exchange students between the age of 15 and 17 and a local 42-year-old mother were killed when the vehicles they were travelling in collided on Highway 60 close to Huntsville, Ontario.	
Mapleton crash	12 June 2026	Mapleton, Ontario	5	Five children were killed when two vehicles collided at an intersection north of Elmira, Ontario.	

== See also ==
- List of traffic collisions (before 2000)
- List of traffic collisions (2000–present)
- List of rail accidents in Canada
- List of Canadian disasters by death toll
