= 2008 Bathurst Boys in Red accident =

Car accident in Canada

Coordinates: 47°35′25″N 65°37′10″W

Boys in Red accident
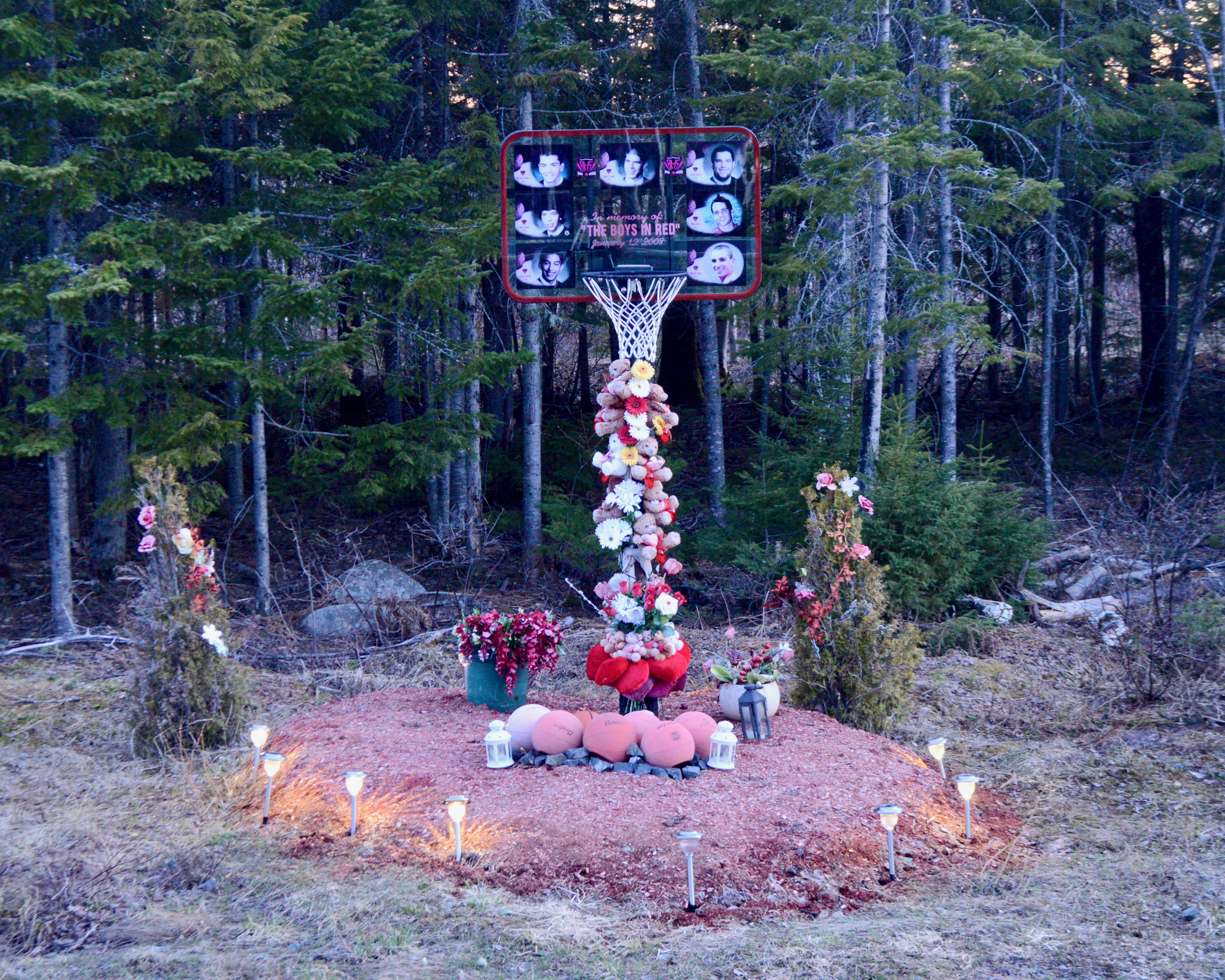

Details
- Date: 0:08 AST (4:08 UTC) January 12, 2008
- Location: Route 8 near Bathurst, New Brunswick
- Country: Canada

Statistics
- Vehicles: 2
- Passengers: 11 + van driver & semi driver
- Deaths: 8
- Injured: 3

The Boys in Red accident^{[a]} occurred on January 12, 2008, outside the city of Bathurst, New Brunswick, Canada. A semi-trailer truck and a van carrying the basketball team from Bathurst High School collided, which killed seven students and the wife of the coach, and injured four other occupants in the van. It was the deadliest transportation accident in New Brunswick since 1989, when a logging truck tipped onto a hayride in Cormier Village, killing 13. It was the deadliest bus accident involving a sports team in Canada until the Humboldt Broncos bus crash in April 2018.

The accident was followed by a national day of mourning in Canada, and a suspension on all 15-passenger van type vehicles being used for student transport in New Brunswick. Two investigations, one by the Royal Canadian Mounted Police (RCMP) and the other by Transport Canada, concluded that "poor weather and a slippery road surface" were major contributing factors in the crash while driver error and "poor mechanical condition of the E350 resulting from inadequate vehicle maintenance" appeared to be a major contributing factors in the crash. Pressure from the public and victims' families prompted the chief coroner of the province to launch an inquiry, which produced recommendations to improve student transport safety in New Brunswick. The provincial government agreed with the majority of the suggestions and has since enacted many of them.

== Accident ==
The accident occurred on New Brunswick Route 8 shortly after midnight on January 12, 2008, when the team coach was driving the Bathurst High School basketball team northward back from a game in Moncton against the Moncton High School Purple Knights in a 15 passenger 1997 Ford Econoline Club Wagon. Light freezing rain and low visibility created poor, slippery driving conditions. As the van approached the Bathurst city limits, the van lost control and veered in front of a southbound semi-trailer truck. The truck collided with the side of the van and the two vehicles came to rest on the shoulder of the southbound lane of the highway approximately 40 metres (130 ft) from the point of impact.

The police officer who discovered the wreck initially suspected that only the semi had gone off the road. After further investigation, he found the van and called for emergency services, whose arrival was delayed by freezing rain. The rear wall and a large portion of the right-hand side of the van, including three rows of seats, had been torn away, ejecting several occupants.

Seven players aged 15–17, Elizabeth Lord, an elementary school teacher and spouse of the driver, 51, were pronounced dead at the scene. Wayne Lord, the driver of the van, his daughter and two players survived the accident and were rushed to Chaleur Regional Hospital in Bathurst. Of the injured, one was listed in critical condition, and two others were stable. The drivers of both vehicles were not injured.

== Aftermath ==
The accident was met with grief and condolences from New Brunswick and across Canada. Mental health specialists and teachers from around the province teamed up to help provide support to students, families, and friends of the victims.

Following the accident, New Brunswick immediately halted the use of 15-passenger vans and began a thorough review of transportation policy; many other provinces later did the same. At the time of the tragedy only Nova Scotia had a ban on 15-passenger vans, following an accident in 1984.

Many at Bathurst High School speculated that its senior varsity basketball team would not be able to continue after the crash. Only five team members remained, including three students who did not go to Moncton because of illness. Despite this, the Bathurst Phantoms' basketball team defeated the Campobello Vikings 82–50 to win the Provincial AA championship the following year.

== Investigation ==
Both the Royal Canadian Mounted Police (RCMP) and Transport Canada conducted investigations into the accident. The RCMP released its report on July 29, 2008. The report stated that the van would not have passed a safety inspection at the time of the accident because of rust in its body, worn all-season tires, and faulty brakes. None of these factors could be identified as the sole cause of the accident, but the report noted that "together, they certainly contributed". The report added that speed was not a factor in the crash, as the van was only travelling about 73 kilometres per hour (45 mph) and the truck at approximately 80 kilometres per hour (50 mph) at the time of impact, both of which were well below the posted limit of 100 kilometres per hour (62 mph). The van had been inspected on October 29, 2007, just over two months prior to the collision, and was four months away from its next inspection. The report resulted in public questioning of New Brunswick's motor vehicle inspection program.

Transport Canada released its report on July 30, 2008. It blamed weather conditions, but also focused on driver fatigue and driver error. It cited several breaches of provincial law regarding the operation of commercial vehicles. The coach had been on duty for sixteen hours when the collision happened, contravening the law that one cannot drive if they have been working more than fourteen consecutive hours. The report also identified inadequate pre-trip inspections and log book keeping, and the lack of a contingency plan in the event of poor weather. Transport Canada stated that although they put an added emphasis on some factors, their report was consistent with the RCMP's. They concurred that the vehicle would have failed an inspection in its pre-collision state because of worn tires and brakes.

Six of the dead were not wearing seat belts, while a seventh was not properly restrained. Greg Sypher, a collision analyst and principal Transport Canada investigator, later suggested that seat belts most likely would not have saved all the victims' lives. One player's father credits the fact that his son was not wearing his seatbelt for his son's survival, saying that if he had not been thrown to the floor just before the collision he may also have died.

== Legal ==
On November 12, 2008, the RCMP ruled out laying criminal charges in relation to the accident. It stated that the finding had been reviewed by a Crown prosecutor and that no wrongdoing was found. The families of two of the deceased expressed disapproval of the decision and indicated that they may bring a lawsuit against several of the involved parties, though others have publicly stated that they accepted the decision. The chief coroner of the province stated that a provincial inquest was possible, though it would take some time to come to any decision on the matter. No decision on whether or not to have an inquest was made for over a month.

Two families accused the Department of Public Safety of "dragging its feet". These families stated that they wanted a "Van Angels" law that would require any driver taking students outside of their community to possess a Class 2 driver's license. They also wanted a weather law that would prevent students from travelling outside of their communities during severe weather. Ana Acevedo and Isabelle Hains, mothers of two of the deceased, went so far as to launch a website, vanangels.ca, which is dedicated to the memory of their sons and contains a blog related to the accident formerly included a petition to hold an inquest.

On December 17, 2008, Greg Forestell, the province's acting chief coroner, called for an inquiry into the accident, stating that "[t]he inquest gives us the opportunity to pull all those facts together in a comprehensive manner and look at the issues in their entirety and have the jury make recommendations for prevention." The decision was met with much approval from the victims' families. The inquest began on May 4, 2009, and lasted until May 14. It included testimony from survivors, experts, and provincial officials. The inquest did not blame anyone directly for the accident, but the jury returned 24 recommendations. Kelly Lamrock stated that the province intended to implement the "vast majority" of these recommendations and that a third of them had already been initiated.

=== Atlantic Wholesalers Limited and Loblaws lawsuit ===
On December 22, 2009, Atlantic Wholesalers Limited and Loblaw Companies, the owners of the transport truck that had been struck by the van, filed a joint claim in the New Brunswick Court of Queen's Bench against the coach and van driver Wayne Lord as well as Bathurst Van Inc., the non-profit that had operated the vehicle. The plaintiffs alleged that the defendants' negligence had caused the crash and sought $40,667.86 in damages, plus $847.50 to cover the clean-up costs.

The filing attracted widespread criticism and calls for a boycott. On January 8, 2010, Loblaws issued a statement made by Allan Leighton to the Canadian Broadcasting Corporation, announcing that it had withdrawn the claim and issued an apology, saying it would not seek further action.

== Memorials ==
A memorial for the victims was unveiled on June 6, 2008, at Bathurst High School. An archway with a basketball net was placed in a courtyard behind the school. The memorial was funded by donations.

A temporary memorial at the crash site consisting of two basketball nets and flowers was also erected, and one of the nets featuring pictures of the players remained there as of August 2022.

A permanent "Boys in Red" memorial for the victims of the van crash has been erected on an empty lot on King Avenue in the city's downtown area near the Bathurst High School. The memorial was erected in a small walking park near the school. It consists of seven vertical columns of red quartz. The site has been used for a memorial space in the past as 2 small stones with plaques are placed by the St John street sidewalks of the park with 2 small trees erected as a memorial of two Bathurst High students who were among the class of 2001 who died in automobile accidents as well a few months before graduation. Every year the school holds a memorial for those who died, with students and staff allowed to place a wreath and observe a moment of silence.

== Reactions ==
John McLaughlin, School District 15 Superintendent, stated that the community of Bathurst was in a state of shock and mourning. McLaughlin also noted that the coach held the appropriate license to drive the vehicle and that there were no laws or regulations in the province which regulated team transportation in the event of poor weather. He also added:

That's really hard because you have to gauge the weather each time you have to make a decision. As for what happened last night, I can't comment. I don't have that information. But in general, our people take great care in making decisions based on the information that they have at the time.

Premier Shawn Graham said "I just want to extend sympathies to the affected families. This is a tragic situation for the community of Bathurst and our province." Prime Minister of Canada Stephen Harper said the incident had "shocked the nation" and called for a day of mourning. Valery Vienneau, Bishop of Bathurst, read a message on behalf of Pope Benedict XVI stating: "[The Pope] expresses sentiments of deep sympathy and spiritual closeness to the members of their families and to all staff and students who have been touched by this tragedy. The Pope assures all concerned of his prayers for those who died and for their families."

On January 16, all sports-related extracurricular activities in New Brunswick were cancelled. Services were held across the country. Some schools asked students to wear red and black, the colours of Bathurst High School. The funeral for the seven deceased players was held in Bathurst at the K. C. Irving Regional Centre, which was filled with 6,000 people. An additional 3,500 mourners filled the adjacent rink to watch the service on a widescreen television. Elizabeth Lord's private funeral followed the next day.

== Legacy ==
On August 26, 2008, a government working group presented New Brunswick Education Minister Kelly Lamrock with eight recommendations for extracurricular transportation. The recommendations included that guidelines for transporting students to school-related extracurricular activities be strengthened, that a school bus be used when transporting ten or more students, that vehicles be equipped with snow tires if travelling between October 15 and April 30, and that the district superintendent be charged with responsibility for ensuring safe transportation of students to and from extracurricular activities. Lamrock initially suggested that schools voluntarily follow the recommendations, though they were later made into enforceable policy.

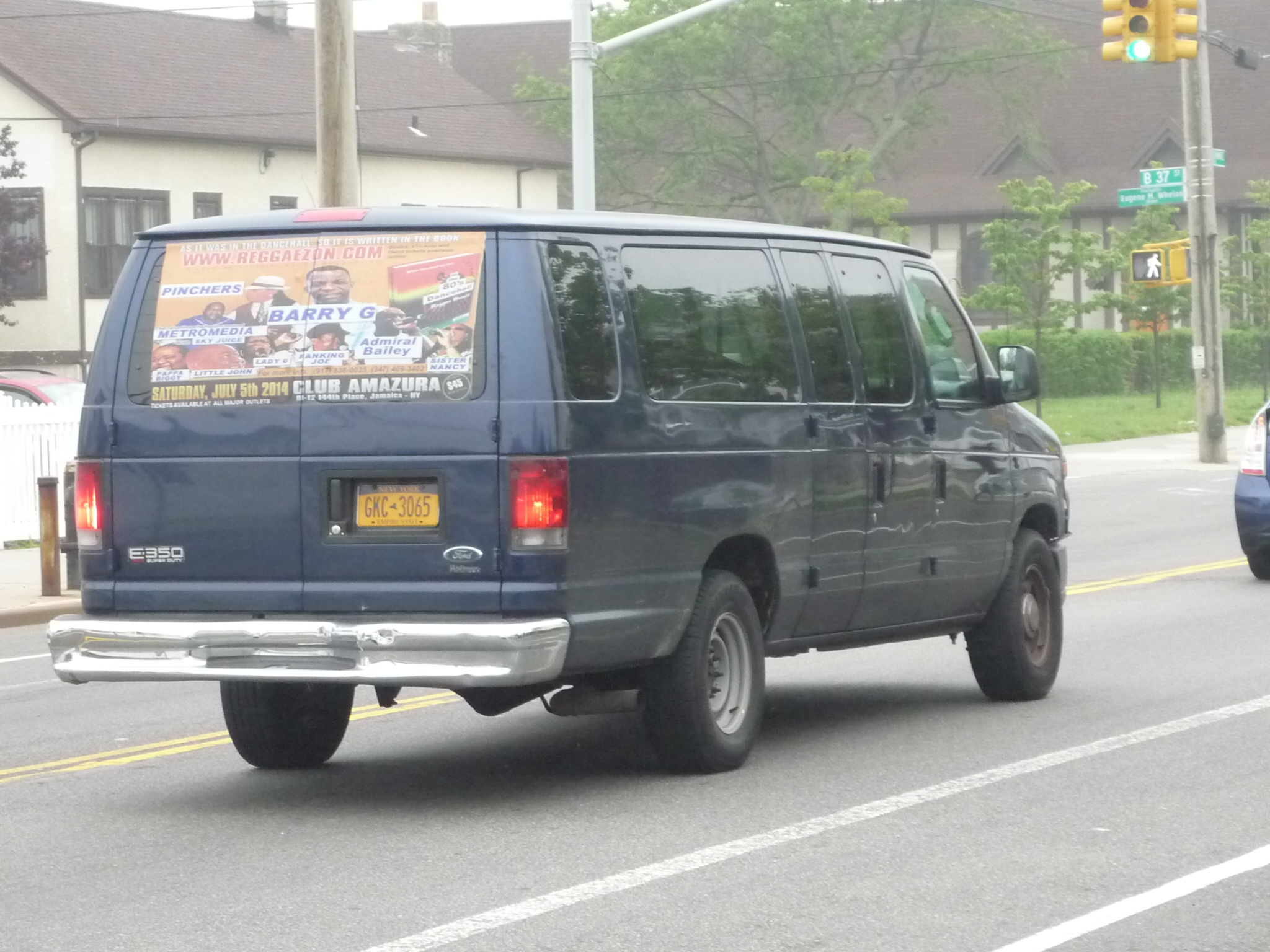
Ford E-350 with the extended 15-passenger configuration like the 1997 Econoline Club Wagon in the accident

One major effect of the recommendations is that, as of November 2008, it is mandatory that all vehicle operators who intend to use their vehicles to transport students between extracurricular activities be covered by a Third Party Liability and Accident Benefit policy. These policies must be in the amount of no less than CAD$1 million for vehicles with a capacity of fewer than 10 passengers, and no less than CAD$5 million for vehicles with a capacity of 10 or more. This also applies to parents driving others' children to school related extracurricular activities.

The changes were met with critical reception in the province. Many students are now required to pay higher sports fees to cover higher transportation costs. Some schools do not have access to approved vehicles because the Education Act prohibits schools and school districts from owning vehicles. To get around this they use corporate entities to operate vehicles for extracurricular activities. These require money to buy new vehicles and the required insurance, which often requires schools to conduct extra fundraising.

== See also ==
- List of accidents involving sports teams
- List of deadliest Canadian traffic accidents
- List of disasters in Canada
- List of road accidents

== Note ==
- ^[a] The accident's name is derived from the Bathurst High School colors, red and black.
