= Chipman-Lamont school bus-train collision =

1960 vehicle collision in Alberta, Canada

- Crash site (Alberta)

Details
- Date: November 29, 1960
- Location: Lamont, Alberta

Statistics
- Vehicles: 2 (bus, train)
- Passengers: 42
- Deaths: 17

The Chipman-Lamont school bus-train collision occurred on November 29, 1960, when a bus carrying 42 students from Chipman, Alberta, near Edmonton, Alberta, was struck by a Canadian National Railway owned freight train, just east of Lamont, Alberta, killing 17 on board.

== Accident ==
On November 29, 1960, a bus carrying 42 students from the town of Chipman, Alberta, was struck at a railway crossing on their way to a neighboring high school in the town of Lamont, Alberta. The railway crossing did not have signals to indicate if crossing was safe. At the time of the incident, the bus was being driven by 31-year old Frank Budney. Budney had been driving the bus for about a month after the regular driver quit, complaining of issues with the brakes. He had a total of 4 months experience as a bus driver. The engineer of the freight train was W. D. MacIvor, and the conductor was C. W. Mayhew. The train had traveled from Saskatoon and was bound for Edmonton.

A teacher in a car directly behind the bus recalled the bus stopping at the crossing, then continuing through just prior to the train hitting. It is speculated that the driver was blinded by the sun. It was also reported that the train was blowing its horn prior to the strike, but was difficult to hear in the bus.

The impact caused the bus to hit a metal pole, sheering it in half; the train dragged the front half a kilometer down the tracks before the train was able to stop. Bodies were scattered throughout the wreckage with some bodies so badly injured that they could not be recognized. Of the 42 students on the bus, 17 (15 girls and 2 boys) were killed, with many others hospitalized with severe injuries. The ages of the victims ranged from 14 to 18. Budney, the driver, survived the crash while sustaining critical injuries. Following the crash he was in a coma for five days, and after regaining consciousness he suffered from memory loss. 10 bodies were found still on the bus, while 6 were found at the point of impact. Deaths were concentrated around students who were sitting at the front of the bus. Only one student escaped the crash completely uninjured.

== Aftermath ==
Following the crash, some victims were taken to Archer Memorial Hospital (now Lamont Healthcare Centre), which was 6 blocks away from the crash site. The accident caused the 100-bed hospital to be filled to capacity. Medical personnel, supplies, and blood were rushed in from nearby Edmonton in response to the crash.

Classes resumed at Lamont High on December 1, 1960.

Caskets of the victims were taken to Chipman School auditorium on December 2, 1960 for a memorial service. Approximately 10,000 people attended the memorial, which continued to the morning. The next day, December 3rd, each victim was taken to be buried in churches of their respective faiths around Chipman. One victim, Darleen Reinhardt, was buried in Edmonton on December 2nd.

Budney was charged with criminal negligence and tried in Edmonton starting February 1, 1961. During the trial it was revealed that Budney only had a valid class "D" license, and an expired class "B" license. Bus drivers were required to have a valid class "A" license at that time. Budney was also found to not have left his seat to check for oncoming traffic, which is now standard practice in many jurisdictions. It was also found that the train was travelling at excessive speed. Following the inquest, Budney was acquitted of his charges on October 11, 1961.

In response to the tragedy the Chipman Lions Club and the School Bus Drivers Associated banded together to form the Chipman-Lamont Tragedy Association. Together these organizations raised a over a total of $16,800 for the victims and their families.

== Legacy ==
The Chipman-Lamont school bus-train collision remains the deadliest traffic accident in Alberta history. On November 29, 2010, the remaining victims of the crash gathered in Chipman to commemorate the 50th anniversary of the crash. In May, 2021, a Gofundme was set up to raise money for a memorial to honor the victims. Two memorials were erected in 2022, one at the site of the accident and one in Chipman, Alberta.

== See also ==
- List of deadliest Canadian traffic accidents
- List of traffic collisions (before 2000)
- List of disasters in Canada
