= Hampstead crash =

2012 motor vehicle incident in Canada

- Crash site (Ontario)

Details
- Date: February 6, 2012

Statistics
- Vehicles: 2 (truck, van)
- Deaths: 11
- Injured: 3

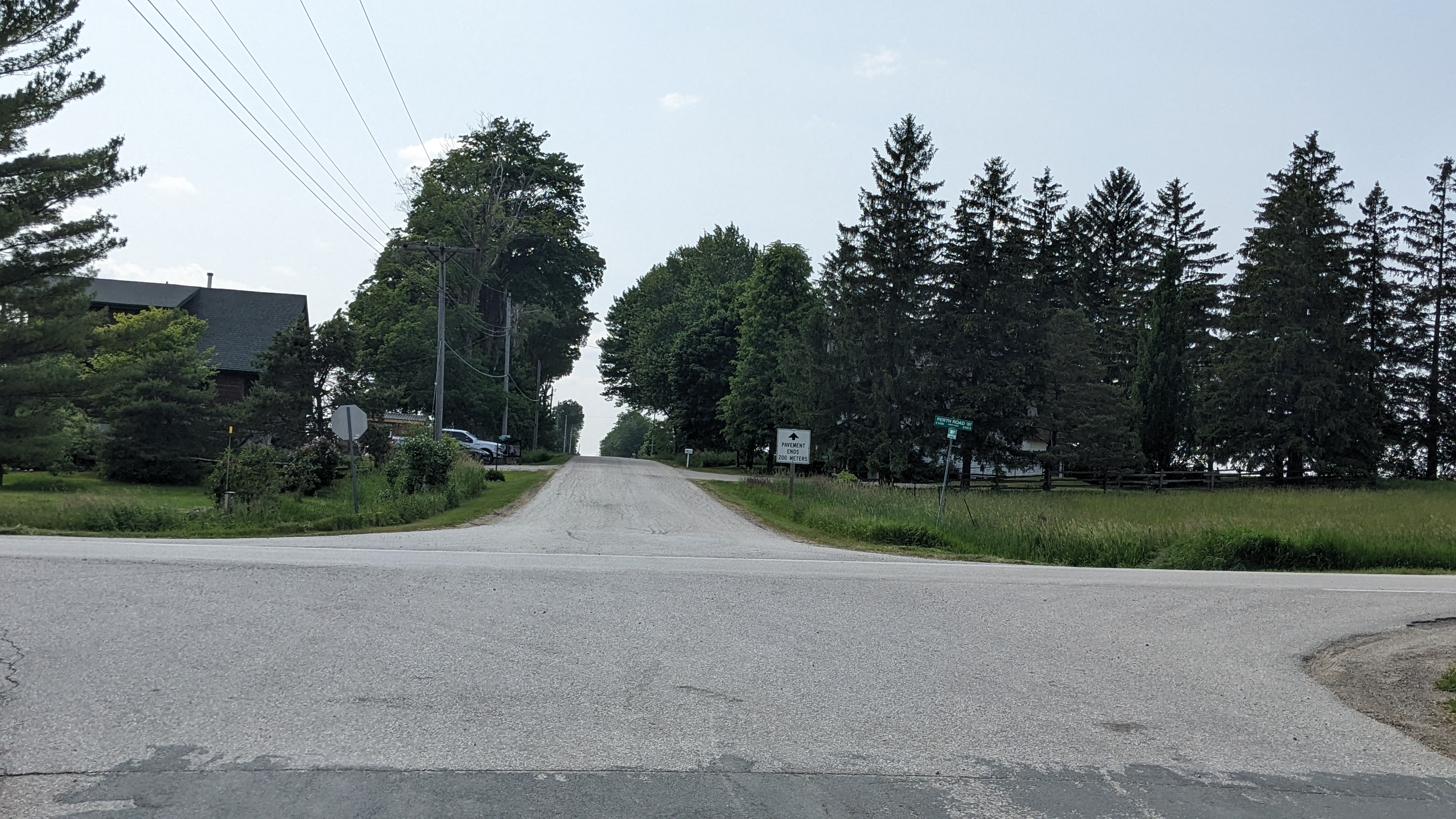
Hampstead intersection

The Hampstead crash occurred on February 6, 2012, when a flatbed truck struck a passenger van filled with 13 migrant workers from a nearby poultry farm near Hampstead, Ontario, west of Kitchener, Ontario. The drivers of both vehicles died, as well as nine farm workers.

== Crash ==
At approximately 4:46 pm on the evening of February 6, 2012, a GMC Savana passenger van carrying 13 migrant workers travelling west along Line 47, struck a flatbed truck travelling south, at the intersection of County Rd 107. The intersection had stop signs for east and westbound traffic only. The migrants who were of mostly Peruvian descent were returning home from a day of work at a nearby chicken farm. The crash propelled the van an estimated 75 meters through a residential yard and up against a blue, two-story farmhouse. First responders and local bystanders who rushed to the crash scene, reported a language barrier in communicating with the survivors. Ten passengers in the van including the driver were killed in the crash, as well as the lone driver of the flat bed truck. Three survivors were found in the wreckage, two were taken to Stratford General Hospital by ambulance and the other victim was flown by helicopter to a Hamilton hospital. Officials stated it was a miracle that anyone survived, given the horrific nature of the crash.

== Investigation ==
During their follow-up investigation, OPP concluded that the driver of the passenger van ignored the stop sign on Line 47, broadsiding the truck who had the right of way, as it entered the intersection. They also reported that the driver of the vehicle did not have the proper class of license to be operating the van, which could carry up to 15 people. The Ministry of Labor investigated the company that employed the workers and operated the van and found no evidence of wrongdoing. No charges were laid in the crash.

== Aftermath ==
The crash lead to renewed concerns surrounding the safety of extended vans like the one transporting the workers. A group of mothers from New Brunswick who lost their sons in the Bathurst boys in red accident in 2008, also called on authorities to renew calls for a ban on the vans. They contended that being more top-heavy than comparable vehicles, the vans are at higher risk of rollover and less safe because they were initially designed as cargo vehicles and therefore lack reinforced steel roofs or crash-proof windows, which are common features in other passenger vehicles.

== Fundraising ==
Through the inception of the Migrant Workers Family Support Fund Support Fund, created by UFCW Canada and Agricultural Workers Alliance (AWA), approximately $225,000 was raised through the generosity of organizations, labour allies and individuals across Canada. In total, 14 individuals or family members of those who perished, received 100% of the funds collected, including the family of the flatbed truck driver who also perished in this accident.

== Legacy ==
The Hampstead crash remains the second deadliest traffic accident in Ontario history.

== See also ==
- List of deadliest Canadian traffic accidents
- Bathurst boys in red accident
- List of traffic collisions (2000–present)
