= Eastman bus crash =

1978 bus crash in Eastman, Quebec

- Crash site (Southern Quebec) Crash site (Quebec) Crash site (Canada)

Details
- Date: August 4, 1978
- Location: Eastman, Quebec

Statistics
- Vehicles: School Bus
- Passengers: 47
- Deaths: 40
- Injured: 0

The Eastman bus crash occurred on August 4, 1978 when forty people were killed after the chartered bus they were travelling in suffered brake failure, causing the bus to careen down a steep hill, plunging into Lac d'Argent, just east of Montreal, Quebec, near the town of Eastman. The driver plus 6 volunteers, who were assisting the group on a visit to a theatre performance in another town, escaped from the bus before it sank. The crash is the second deadliest road traffic accident in Canadian history after the 1997 Les Éboulements bus accident that killed 44 people.

== Accident ==
On the evening of August 4, 1978, members and volunteers of the Fraternité des malades et des personnes handicapées d'Asbestos, left the town of Asbestos, Quebec on a chartered bus to attend a theatrical performance at the Théâtre de la Marjolaine, in the town of Eastman. Just before midnight, as the bus was leaving the theatre, the driver lost control of the bus due to brake failure as the bus was descending a steep hill towards Lac d'Argent. The driver was faced with two choices, negotiate the 90 degree turn onto the highway at the bottom of the hill and risk flipping the bus or head for the lake and hope for a softer landing in the water. He chose to head to the lake. Passing over the highway and on to the beach the bus would hit the water at approximately 64km/hr, skimming across the lake and coming to a floating rest 80 metres from shore, in 20 metres of water. The bus would float for approximately 15 minutes before sinking. Six volunteers and the driver managed to escape. None of the disabled survived. It would take 28 hours for rescue crews and divers to locate the bus and pull it to shore where the bodies were evacuated on shore. One body was recovered from shore.

== Investigation ==
In the days after the crash, an investigation would ensue that highlighted some of the key issues that lead to the crash. Investigators would learn that only one set of brakes out of four had been operational at the time of the crash. Survivors also noted that the driver had stopped several times on the way to the theatre to troubleshoot a sticky accelerator pedal. It was also revealed that owner/mechanic of the charter company had removed the hand parking brake that evening as parts to repair it had been difficult to find. The driver was not charged or found to be negligent in the crash.

== Aftermath ==
The tragedy would go on to raise awareness around bus safety across the province. On August 17, 1978 the province of Quebec announced regulations that would require all buses to undergo routine maintenance every 3 months. Of the 143 buses tested that September, only 37 passed inspection. A memorial plaque was erected close to the accident scene by Lac d'Argent.

== Legacy ==
The Eastman bus crash remains the second deadliest traffic accident in Canadian history.

== In media ==
The Eastman bus crash was the subject of a 2005 episode of Disasters of the Century.

== See also ==
- List of deadliest Canadian traffic accidents
- List of traffic collisions (before 2000)
- List of disasters in Canada by death toll
