= Colonial Coach Lines bus accident =

1953 road incident in Ontario, Canada

- Crash site (Ontario)

Details
- Date: July 31, 1953
- Location: Morrisburg, Ontario

Statistics
- Vehicles: 2 (Bus, Truck)
- Passengers: 37
- Deaths: 20
- Injured: 19

The Colonial Coach Lines bus accident occurred on July 31, 1953 after a passenger bus carrying 37 occupants travelling from Toronto, Ontario to Montreal, Quebec, collided with a truck that was stalled on the side of Highway 2, near Morrisburg, Ontario, killing 20 passengers on board.

== Accident ==
On July 31, 1953 at approximately 04:00am, a Colonial Coach Bus Line passenger bus on an overnight express, en route from Toronto, Ontario to Montreal, Quebec, struck a stalled truck with its lights off, on Highway 2 close to Morrisburg, Ontario. The bus careened off the highway down a 25-foot embankment ending up in the Williamsburg canal system in about 6 meters of water. Some passengers would escape by kicking out windows and smashing doors. In the end 20 passengers were dead and 17, including the driver, would escape. The driver of the parked truck would also survive.

== Aftermath ==
An inquest was originally scheduled to begin on August 7, 1953, but it was cancelled after criminal charges were laid against Max Roodman, the 40-year-old driver of the stalled truck, and Lorne Chesebrough, the 28-year-old bus driver. On August 6, after an investigation by OPP Inspector Robert H. Wannell, Roodman and Chesebrough were both charged with manslaughter. The charges were specifically in connection to the death of bus passenger John Fanya, who had survived the initial crash, but drowned after diving into the sumberged bus several times to save other passengers.

Chesebrough's charge was reduced to dangerous driving in early October. His trial was held on October 21 at the courthouse in Cornwall, Ontario. Chesebrough's counsel, Royden A. Hughes, QC, moved that the charge be dismissed "on the grounds there was no case against his client and "much of the evidence presented by the Crown was evidence in defence of the accused."" The motion was granted by Judge G. E. Brennan.

Roodman's trial was held at the courthouse in Cornwall, Ontario from October 29 to November 2, 1953. The presiding judge was Justice F. H. Barlow. Roodman was represented by J. C. Horwitz, QC. An Ontario Supreme Court jury found him guilty of manslaughter on November 2 after deliberating for just over an hour. The following day, Roodman was sentenced to one year in reformatory and his driving license was permanently suspended.

== Victims ==
This list comes from news reports and provincial death records.

- Mrs. Adrian or Adrienne Bertrand of Montreal, QC.
- Hubert Clarence Bird of Hamilton, ON.
- Murray Brettschneider of Montreal, QC.
- Anne Connelly of Blackpool, England.
- Kathleen Mary Cosgrove of Toronto, ON.
- Weston Melvin Doak of Fredericton, NB.
- John Fanya of Hamilton, ON and Churchill, MB. He was an Ordinary Seaman with ID number 25776-H.
- Gilles Godin of Montreal, QC.
- George Napier Graham of Ingersoll, ON.
- Eleanor Kormer of Ste. Anne de Bellevue, QC.
- Hector Joseph McAdam of Toronto, ON and Glace Bay, NS.
- Mrs. Margaret McKee of Butte City, California.
- Colin McKinnon of Summerside, P.E.I.
- Ruth Barbara Parks of St. George, NB.
- Catherine Lily Susan Reynolds of Saint John, NB.
- Gustave Roy of Montreal, QC.
- Max Sabbath of Montreal, QC.
- Edwin Ernest Timermanis of Duparquet, QC.
- Edward Toom of Toronto, ON.
- Geraldine Williams of Montreal, QC.

== Legacy ==
The Colonial Coach Lines bus accident remains the deadliest traffic accident in Ontario history.

== See also ==
- List of deadliest Canadian traffic accidents
- List of traffic collisions (before 2000)
- List of disasters in Canada by death toll
