= Shoal Bay (Newfoundland and Labrador) =

Coordinates: 46.983°N 53.631°W

Shoal Bay is a natural bay off the island of Newfoundland in the province of Newfoundland and Labrador, Canada.
