= HMS Tribune =

Six ships of the Royal Navy have borne the name HMS Tribune, after the Tribunes, elected magistrates of the Roman Republic and Empire:

- HMS Tribune (1796) was a 36-gun fifth rate, previously in French service. She was captured in 1796 by HMS Unicorn, and was wrecked in 1797.
- HMS Tribune (1803) was a 36-gun fifth rate launched in 1803. She was rebuilt as a 24-gun sixth rate in 1832 and was wrecked in 1839.
- HMS Tribune (1853) was a wood screw frigate launched in 1853 and sold in August 1866 to Marshall of Plymouth for breaking up.
- HMS Tribune (1891) was an Apollo-class cruiser launched in 1891 and sold in 1911.
- HMS Tribune (1918) was an S-class destroyer launched in 1918 and sold in 1931.
- HMS Tribune (N76) was a T-class submarine launched in 1938 and broken up in 1947.
