= Astrea (1812 ship) =

History

United Kingdom
- Builder: Stockton
- Launched: 1812
- Fate: Wrecked 8 May 1834

General characteristics
- Tons burthen: 27274/94, or 273 (bm)
- Length: 94 ft 0 in (28.7 m)
- Beam: 25 ft 8 in (7.8 m)
- Depth: 16 ft 1 in (4.9 m)

Astrea was launched at Stockton in 1812. She served as a transport for the British government until about 1819. Thereafter she traded with the Baltic, the Caribbean, and Quebec. She was wrecked, with great loss of life, on 8 May 1834 while carrying migrants to Quebec.

== Career ==
Astrea first appeared in Lloyd's Register (LR) in 1812.

Although Astrea is listed among vessels sailing east of the Cape of Good Hope under a licence from the British East India Company, there is no evidence that she ever did so. Also the same source has her being lost near the Cape of Good Hope, which is incorrect.

Year	Master	Owner	Trade	Source & notes
1812	Grayham	Grayham	London	LR
1818	J.Wilson	Grayham	London transport London–CGH	LR
1819	J.Wilson	Grayham	London–CGH; London–Jamaica	LR
1821	J.Wilson	Grayham	London–Virginia	LR
1822	J.Wilson; Sanderson	Grayham	London–Petersburg	LR; damages repaired 1822
1824	Sanderson	T.Old	London–Petersburg; London–Quebec	LR; damages repaired 1822
1826	Sanderson	T.Old	London–Riga	LR; damages repaired 1822
1827	Sanderson	T.Old	London–Bermuda	LR; damages repaired 1822
1828	Sanderson; Head	T.Old	London–Bermuda	LR; damages repaired 1822
1829	Head	T.Old	London–Saint Lucia	LR; damages repaired 1822
1830	Head; Ridley	T.Old	Belfast–Saint Lucia	LR; damages repaired 1822
1831	Ridley	Ridley	London–Elsinor	LR; damages repaired 1822 and small repair 1831
1832	W.Ridley	Ridley	London–Quebec	LR; damages repaired 1822 and small repair 1831
1833	Kidley; Ridley	Ridley & Co.	London–Bermuda; London–Quebec	Register of Shipping; large repair 1831

== Fate ==
On 8 May 1834 Astrea, Ridley, master, was wrecked 5 nautical miles (9.3 km) east of Louisbourg, Nova Scotia. Astrea was on a voyage from Limerick to Quebec City.

She was carrying 13 crew members and 211 passengers, consisting on 104 adult males, mostly farmers and agricultural labourers from Limerick, Clare, and Tipperary, and their wives and children. The three survivors consisted of her surgeon, who was emigrating to Canada, and two crew members.

Not all the bodies were recovered, and the people on shore were too few to bury properly all that they found. The loss of Astrea, and a few days later, of Fidelity, a few days later, resulted in 1834 in assistance being provided for ship-wrecked mariners, and the construction in 1839 of lighthouses at St. Paul's Island and Scatari.
