= Hayride =

Rural recreational activity

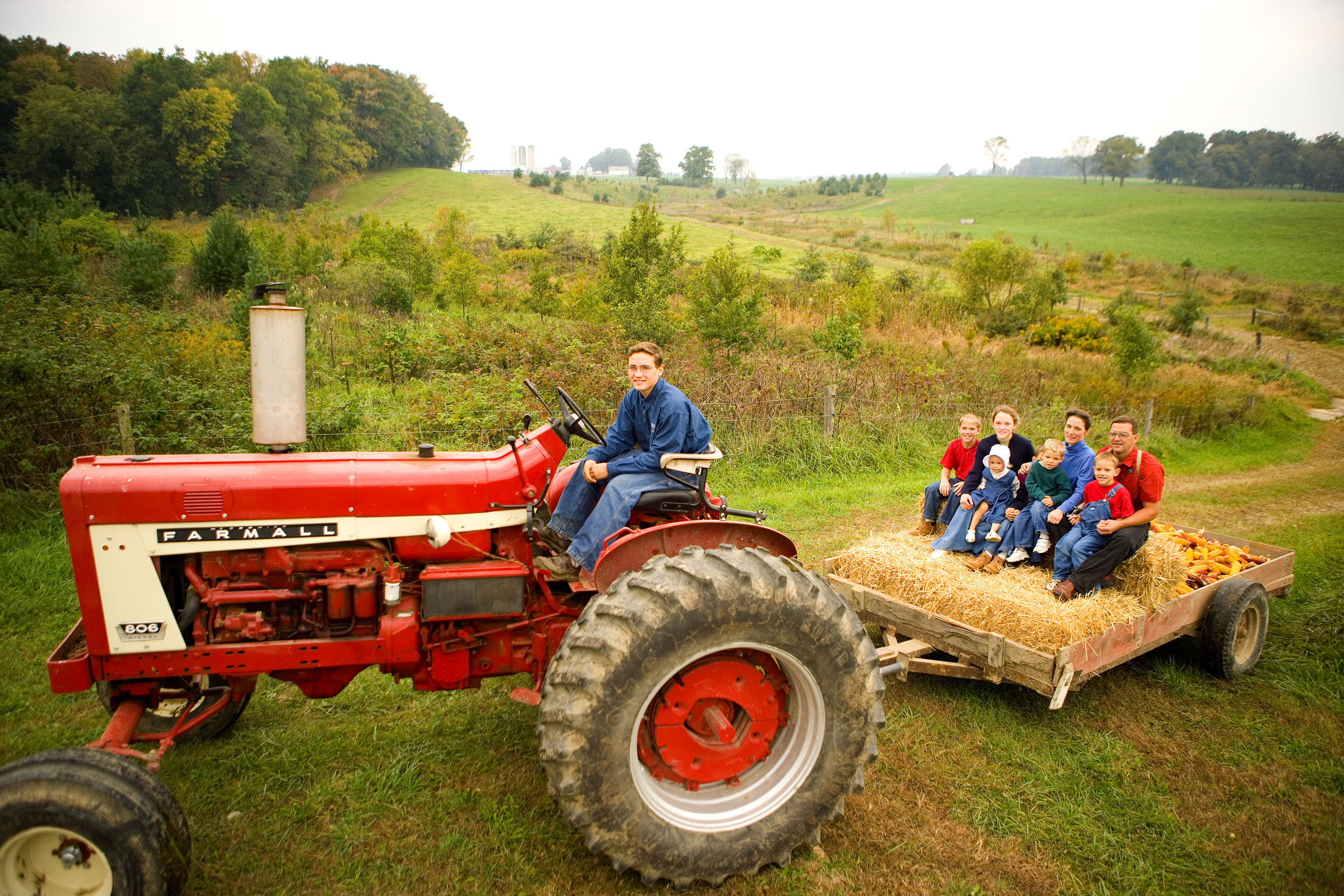
Hayride on a farm in Northeast Ohio.

A hayride (also known as a hayrack ride) is a traditional American and Canadian activity consisting of a recreational ride in a wagon or cart pulled by a tractor, horses or a truck, which has been loaded with hay or straw for comfortable seating.

== Tradition ==
Hayrides traditionally have been held as celebratory activities, usually in connection to celebration of the autumn harvest. Hayrides originated with farmhands and working farm children riding loaded hay wagons back to the barn for unloading, which was one of the few times during the day one could stop to rest during the frenetic days of the haying season. By the late 19th century and the spread of the railroads, tourism and summer vacations in the country had become popular with urban families, many of whom had read idealized accounts of hayrides in children's books. To capitalize on the demand, local farmers began offering "genuine hayrides" on wagons loaded with hay, since one could make more cash income selling rides to "summer people" than by selling the same wagon-load of hay (although most farmers did both).

During this era, farming was transforming from a subsistence system to a cash system, and there were few options for bringing real money into the average farm. Over time the hayride became a real tradition, although the original concept of riding on top of a load of hay was gradually replaced with a simple ride in a wagon sitting on a layer of hay intended to cushion the ride. This was considered far safer than (if not as fun as) riding perched 15-20 feet on top of a slippery pile of hay on a moving vehicle.

Contemporary hayrides are often organized commercially, providing an additional source of income for farms or existing on their own as an enfranchised activity during the fall season. During fall, a hayride may feature a stop at a pumpkin patch where passengers can pick a pumpkin or be dropped off to pick apples. Hayrides may also deliver customers to the entrance of a corn maze.

== Haunted hayrides ==
Hayrides on Halloween are often dubbed as 'haunted hayrides'. These hayrides sometimes incorporate special effects and actors portraying ghosts, monsters, and other spooky creatures to attract thrill-seekers and capitalize on the Halloween season. Haunted Hayrides are held all over North America, but most prominently on the East Coast including major ones in Crownsville, MD and Mountville, PA.

== Accidents ==
Despite the fact that hayrides are typically regarded as a lighthearted activity, there have been incidents where hayrides have flipped or veered off-road and resulted in injuries or death. Other accidents, such as a 1989 incident in Cormier-Village, can occur when hayrides collide with other vehicles on or near roads.

== See also ==
- Louisiana Hayride
- 1989 Cormier-Village hayride accident
