= Great Porcupine Fire =

1911 devastating forest fire in Ontario, Canada

Great Porcupine Fire of 1911
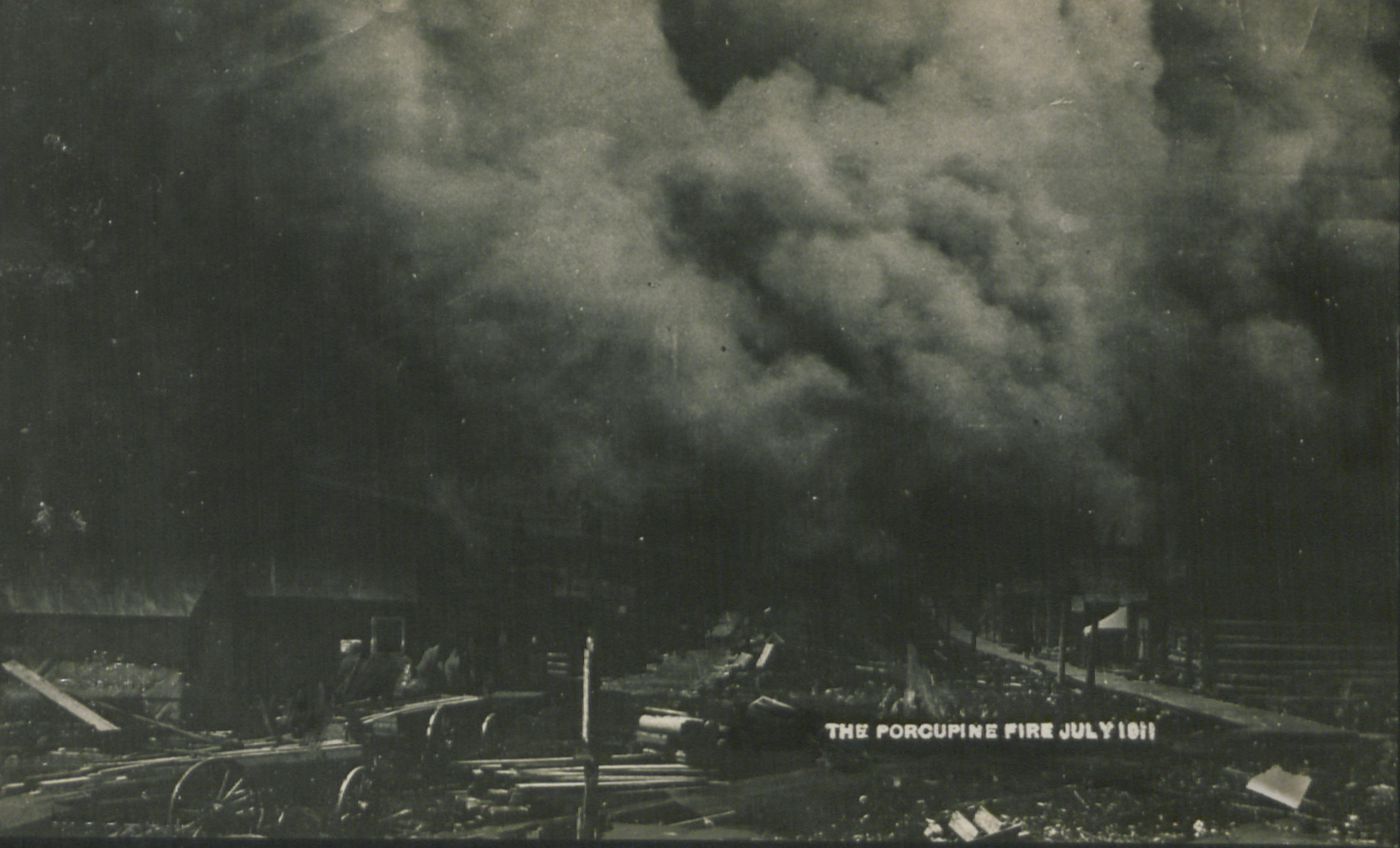
- Date: July 11, 1911 – ?
- Location: Northern Ontario, Canada
- Coordinates: 48.5°N 81.16°W

Statistics
- Burned area: 494,000 acres (199,915 ha)

Impacts
- Deaths: Uncertain (c. 73-200+)

Map
- Location within Ontario

The Great Porcupine Fire of 1911 was one of the most devastating forest fires ever to strike the Ontario northland. Spring had come early that year, followed by an abnormally hot dry spell that lasted into the summer. This created ideal conditions for the ensuing disaster, in which a number of smaller fires converged.

Porcupine, a community on the north side of Porcupine Lake, in the city of Timmins, Ontario, Canada, was the site of a huge gold discovery in 1907. On July 11, 1911, when the Porcupine Gold Rush was at its height, a gale from the southwest whipped some small bush fires into flames. As the fire gained strength, it engulfed the tinder-dry forest, razing everything in its path.

== Casualties and destruction ==
The blaze formed a horseshoe-shaped front over 36 kilometres (22 mi) wide with flames shooting 30 metres (98 ft) into the air. It laid waste to about 200,000 hectares (over 494,000 acres) of forest and killed at least 70 people, though early reports indicated thousands. Many people were drowned as they fled into Porcupine Lake to escape the flames, while others suffocated to death under the mines. At one point, a car of dynamite stored at the railway station exploded, lashing the lake into waves 3 metres (nine feet) high. The exact number of dead is not known as the vast forest in the region contained an unknown number of prospectors at the time of the fire. Official counts list 73 dead, though it is estimated the actual toll could have been as high as 200.

Mining camps and the boomtowns of South Porcupine and Pottsville were destroyed; Golden City (now called Porcupine) and Porquis Junction were partially destroyed. The next day, the fire swept through the nearby town of Cochrane.

== Aftermath ==
Communities throughout Ontario responded generously with aid. Because of the importance of the gold discoveries, very few people abandoned the mining camps and, remarkably, the area was rebuilt in a short period of time. One unexpected result of the fire was the creation of a fresh water spring where explosives had blown up. The aftermath of the disaster brought a renewed sense of purpose to the devastated communities. A monument erected at the Whitney Cemetery by the Toronto Board of Trade, commemorates the event and the victims.

The definitive book on the great fires is Killer in the Bush by Michael Barnes.

== Historical plaque ==
An Ontario Heritage Foundation historical plaque stands on the grounds of Northern College in Porcupine and reads:

THE PORCUPINE FIRE
In the summer of 1911, when the Porcupine gold rush was at its height the weather was hot and dry. On July 11, galeforce winds from the southwest whipped individual bush fires into a 16 km sea of flames that swiftly engulfed the drought-parched forest. The fire-storm swept through mining camps, razed the towns of South Porcupine and Pottsville, and partially destroyed Golden City (Porcupine) and Porquis Junction. Many people fled into Porcupine Lake to escape the flames. The blaze laid waste to about 200,000 hectares of forest and killed at least seventy-one people. Communities throughout Ontario responded generously with aid, and in a remarkably short time the towns were rebuilt and the mines back in operation.

== See also ==
- Great Matheson Fire of 1916
- Great Fire of 1922
- List of Canadian disasters by death toll
