= CP Rail crew bus crash =

1980 disaster in Saskatchewan, Canada

Coordinates: 50.1817°N 108.2344°W

- Crash site (Saskatchewan)

Details
- Date: May 28, 1980
- Location: Webb, Saskatchewan

Statistics
- Vehicles: 3 (Bus, Car, Transport Truck)
- Passengers: 30
- Deaths: 22
- Injured: 11

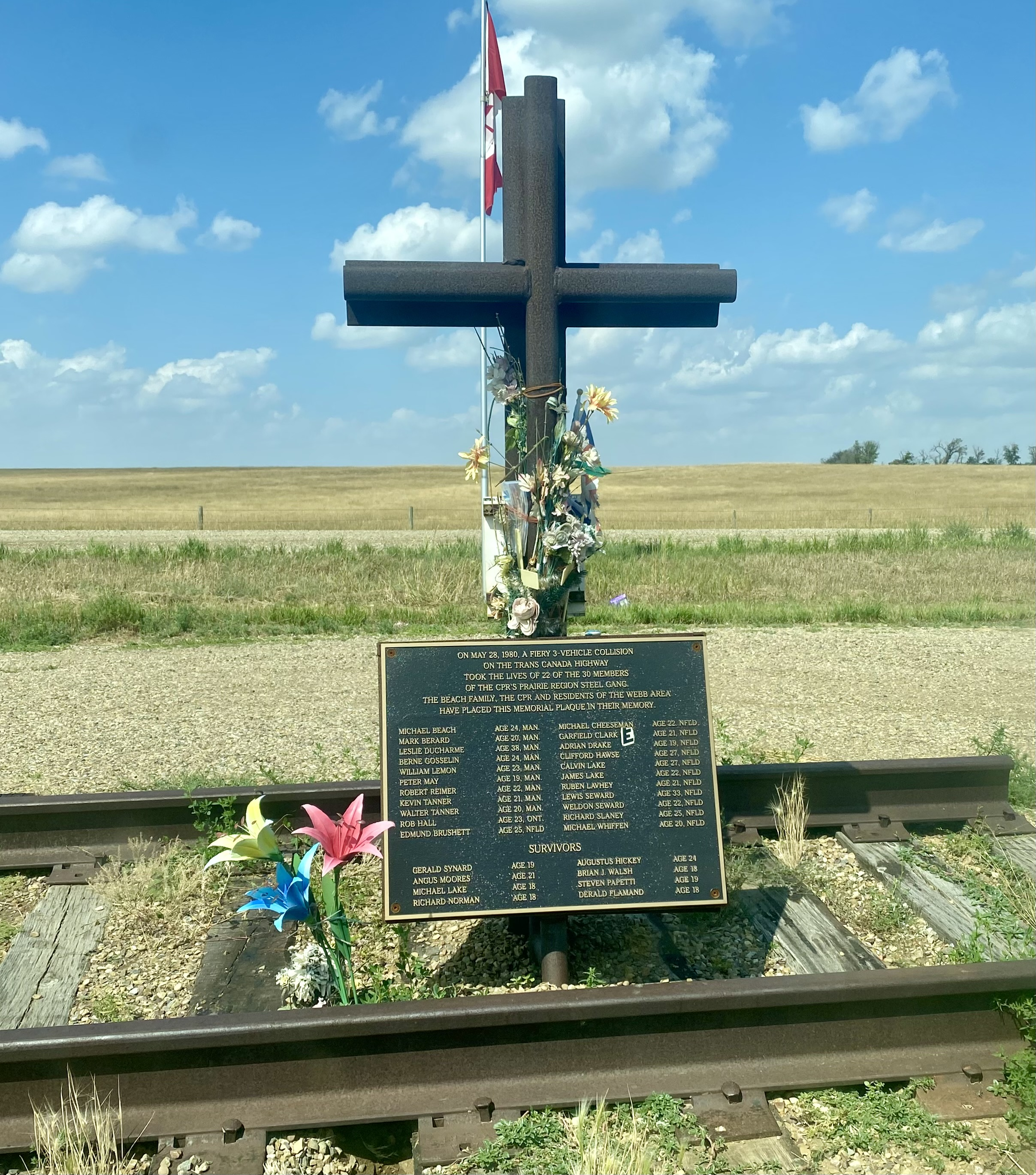
Memorial for CPR'S PRAIRIE REGION STEEL GANG.

The CP Rail crew bus crash occurred May 28, 1980, when twenty-two people were killed after the school bus they were travelling in was sideswiped by an oncoming car near Webb, Saskatchewan. The collision remains the deadliest traffic accident in Saskatchewan history.

== Accident ==
On May 28, 1980, a bus carrying 30 Canadian Pacific Railway workers, known as the "Prairie Region Steel Gang", was returning home after work they were doing on the railway was cut short by rain. At approximately 2:30pm on the TransCanada highway, just west of Webb, Saskatchewan, the bus was struck on its side by an oncoming car, causing the bus to flip on its side. The bus was then hit from behind by a transport truck carrying liquid asphalt, setting off a fiery blaze. Most of the passengers died instantly on scene with others dying either at the hospital or enroute. Many of the charred bodies could only be identified by tattoos, clothing or physique. Among the dead, 12 were Newfoundlanders, 9 Manitobans, and one from Ontario. Of the 30 passengers on board the bus, only 8 would survive, along with the 2 occupants of the car and the driver of the truck.

== Aftermath ==
In August 1980, a bronze memorial plaque honoring the 22 victims was unveiled approximately 22 km west of Swift Current, Saskatchewan.

The memorial was updated in June 2026 when a new plaque was added giving more historical context on the crash.

== Legacy ==
The CP Rail Crew bus crash remains the deadliest traffic accident in Saskatchewan history and the third deadliest in Canada's history.

== See also ==
- List of deadliest Canadian traffic accidents
- List of traffic collisions (before 2000)
