= Eastman, Quebec =

Eastman
- Municipality
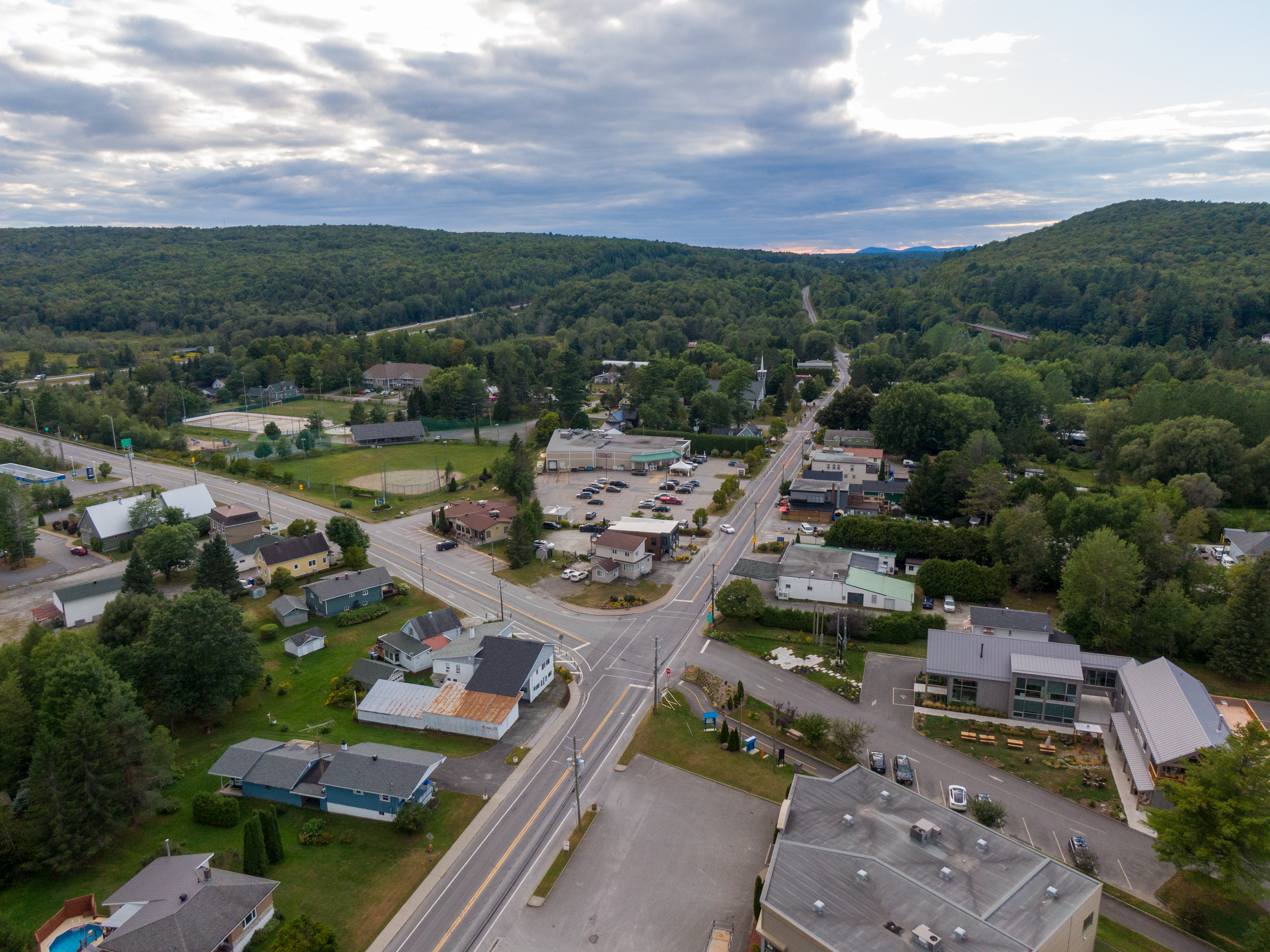
- Eastman in 2025

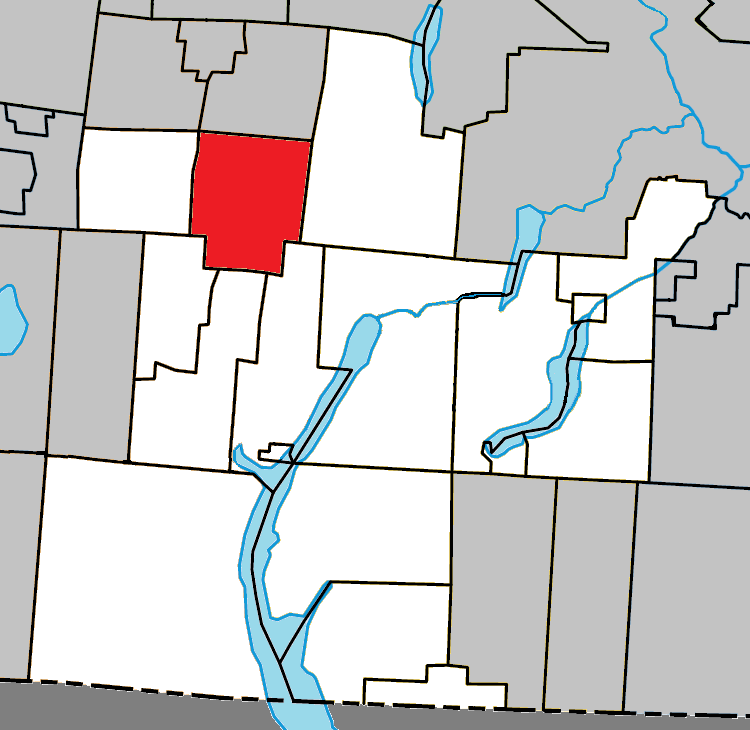
- Location within Memphrémagog RCM

- Location in southern Quebec
- Coordinates: 45°18′N 72°19′W
- Country: Canada
- Province: Quebec
- Region: Estrie
- RCM: Memphrémagog
- Constituted: May 30, 2001

Government
  - Mayor: Gérard Marinovich
  - Federal riding: Brome—Missisquoi
  - Prov. riding: Orford

Area
  - Total: 77.10 km^{2} (29.77 sq mi)
  - Land: 73.57 km^{2} (28.41 sq mi)

Population (2021)
  - Total: 2,279
  - Density: 31/km^{2} (80/sq mi)
  - Pop 2016-2021: ▲23.7%
  - Dwellings: 1,548
- Time zone: UTC−5 (EST)
  - Summer (DST): UTC−4 (EDT)
- Postal code(s): J0E 1P0
- Area codes: 450 and 579
- Highways A-10: R-112; R-245
- Website: eastman.quebec

Eastman is a municipality of about 2,300 people, part of the Memphrémagog Regional County Municipality in the Eastern Townships region of Quebec, Canada.

== Demographics ==
=== Population ===
Population trend:

Census	Population	Change (%)
1991	710	N/A
1996	711	▲0.1%
2001	790	▲11.1%
Merger	1,404 (+)	▲56.3%
2006	1,585	▲12.9%
2011	1,740	▲9.8%
2016	1,843	▲5.9%
2021	2,279	▲23.7%

(+) Amalgamation of the Municipality of Stukely and the Village of Eastman on May 30, 2001.

=== Language ===
Mother tongue (2021)

Language	Population	Pct (%)
French only	2,100	92.1%
English only	95	4.2%
Both English and French	25	1.1%
Non-official languages	50	2.2%

== See also ==
- List of municipalities in Quebec
- Lake Stukely
- 1978 Eastman Bus Crash
