= Carberry bus crash =

2023 crash in Manitoba, Canada

- Crash site (Manitoba) Crash site (Canada) Location of the collision
- Date: June 15, 2023
- Location: Intersection of Manitoba Highway 1 and Manitoba Highway 5 near Carberry, Manitoba; 49.9015°N 99.3621°W
- Deaths: 17
- Injuries: 8

On June 15, 2023, a vehicle collision between a handi-transit bus and a semi-truck occurred on the Trans-Canada Highway in the Municipality of North Cypress – Langford near Carberry, Manitoba, Canada, killing 17 people and injuring 8 others.

== Crash ==
Simplified diagram of the collision

According to the Royal Canadian Mounted Police (RCMP), a semi-truck collided with a 24-seat handi-transit bus operated by Quality Care Transit at the intersection of Manitoba Highway 1 (Trans-Canada Highway) and Manitoba Highway 5, near Carberry, Manitoba. The majority of people on the bus were seniors from Dauphin, Manitoba, who were travelling to the Sand Hills Casino near Carberry. The people aboard the bus, nineteen women and six men, were between 58 and 88 years old. The driver was the co-owner of the company.

Initial investigations determined that the bus was southbound on Highway 5 when it crossed into the eastbound lanes on Highway 1, and was struck by the semi-truck. Later review of the semi-truck's dashcam recording indicated that the semi-truck had the right of way, which was corroborated by witness accounts. According to witnesses, the bus was on fire in the grass on the side of the road, and first responders were trying to get people out. The semi-truck had its front end crumpled and burned.

At 11:43 a.m., when the RCMP first received reports of a collision, an air ambulance and twelve ambulances were dispatched to the scene. In the aftermath of the crash, the RCMP stated that all available resources in western Manitoba had been deployed, and that its major crime services had taken over the investigation. The Shock Trauma Air Rescue Service dispatched two helicopters, one from Winnipeg and one from Regina. Saskatchewan Air Ambulance dispatched two aircraft with doctors onboard from Saskatoon to Brandon to provide support; the planes transported patients onward to Winnipeg.

== Victims ==
Fifteen people were killed in the initial moments, and ten people, including the driver of the bus, were seriously injured and taken to the hospital; a sixteenth person, one of the initial 10 transported with injuries, died due to their injuries six days later. Another victim succumbed to her injuries a month later. The driver of the semi-truck was also sent to the hospital, but has since been released.

According to officials, 10 individuals from the bus were admitted to the hospital with injuries that are likely to be "significant" given the "magnitude and force" of the crash. As of June 16, six of the ten were in critical condition, while the other four were being cared for in a surgical unit. Following the death of one of the injured on June 21, nine remained in hospital with four considered in critical condition. By July 11, seven people remained in hospital, one of them in the critical care unit. Six days later another victim succumbed to her injuries and five were reported to remain in hospital.

According to the RCMP, all ten of the initially injured have been identified and they are still in the process of identifying the deceased.

== Aftermath ==
The RCMP opened two family support centres, one in Dauphin, and an additional one in Winnipeg to meet demand. The Health Sciences Centre in Winnipeg declared a "code orange" due to the mass casualty incident. The RCMP stated that it was "the first mass casualty motor vehicle accident they were aware of in Manitoba."

Those familiar with the area have stated that the intersection between Highway 1 and Manitoba Highway 5 where the collision occurred is dangerous, and they called for safety improvements. The crash also led to a wider discussion on safety of the numerous at-grade intersections along the Trans-Canada Highway as trucking association and citizens advocated for constructing additional grade separations.

A vigil was held in Dauphin at the Ukrainian Orthodox Auditorium on the evening of Thursday, June 22.

== Investigation ==
Police did not immediately state which driver was responsible for the collision. Unlike a number of intersections on Highway 1, this junction is not controlled by traffic signals; as such, traffic on the Trans-Canada Highway, i.e. the semi-truck in this incident, would normally have the right of way. Police also stated that the semi-truck driver was assisting with the investigation. Police did not speak with the bus driver immediately, as he was hospitalized.

Members of the Saskatchewan RCMP who investigated a similar crash involving the Humboldt Broncos five years prior are also assisting with this investigation. The investigation is expected to take several months to complete.

== Response ==
The premier of Manitoba, Heather Stefanson, stated "My heart breaks hearing the news of the tragic accident near Carberry. My most sincere condolences go out to all those involved." Lieutenant-Governor Anita Neville conveyed her sympathies by offering sincere thoughts and prayers to the friends and family who have been directly affected by the situation Several other politicians, including Prime Minister Justin Trudeau, Conservative leader Pierre Poilievre, and premier of Saskatchewan Scott Moe also expressed their condolences. At the House of Commons on Friday, a moment of silence was observed for the victims at the end of question period. According to Trudeau, the flag atop the Peace Tower would be lowered to half-mast.

William Doherty, CEO of Day and Ross, the shipping company to which the truck belonged, promised full cooperation. He also stated that Day and Ross employees are heartbroken by the incident, offering his condolences to families and those affected by the incident. During the news conference, Deputy Premier Cliff Cullen stated that crisis support mental health services would be extended to everyone involved in the upcoming days.

== Legacy ==
=== Intersection improvements ===
The Government of Manitoba announced in January 2024 that $12 million was being set aside to upgrade the intersection at the site of the collisions. A consultant was being hired to investigate whether a roundabout, widening the median, or creating a restricted crossing U-turn would be the best option for the intersection, with the project expected to be completed by fall 2026.

=== First anniversary ceremony & memorial ===
On the first anniversary of the crash, survivors, families, and local and provincial official gathered for a ceremony and unveiled a memorial to the victims was unveiled in the CN Park in Dauphin. Speeches were given by Dauphin mayor David Bosiak, first responders, and premier Wab Kinew and a moment of silence was held.
