= 1997 Les Éboulements bus accident =

Disaster in Quebec, Canada in 1997

Coordinates: 47°27′47.21″N 70°20′22.09″W

Les Éboulements bus accident

Details
- Date: October 13, 1997
- Location: Les Éboulements, Quebec
- Country: Canada
- Operator: Autobus Mercier
- Incident type: Bus Crash
- Cause: Brake failure, aggravated by driver fatigue.

Statistics
- Bus: 1 Transport Bus
- Passengers: 48
- Deaths: 44 (including the driver)
- Injured: 4

The 1997 Les Éboulements bus accident, also known as the St. Joseph Bus Accident, occurred on Thanksgiving Day, October 13, 1997, in Les Éboulements (St-Joseph-de-la-Rive), Quebec, Canada. 44 died as a result of the crash, making it the deadliest traffic collision in Canadian history.

A similar crash had occurred in 1974 at the very same spot and had resulted in 14 deaths.

== Crash ==
The bus, carrying members of a Golden Age Club on an overnight leaf peeping trip, had travelled on Quebec Highways 138 and 362 from Saint-Bernard headed for L'Île-aux-Coudres. It was travelling down Côte des Éboulements, which had a steep hill with a sharp right turn at the base. The time was 1:45 pm, and the roads were dry and clear. The driver, André Desruisseaux, was unable to slow the bus to negotiate the curve, and the bus collided with the guardrail, smashed through it and plunged over 10 metres into a ravine.

It landed, slid on its right side and came to rest beside an elevated railway line. The crash and fall slammed the occupants violently around the interior of the vehicle, injuring most of them fatally. No skid marks were found on the road at the site of the crash, leading authorities to immediately suspect brake failure. Witnesses also reported a stench of overheated brakes coming from the bus.

== Victims ==
There were 48 people aboard the bus, including the driver. Five survived the crash initially, however one of them succumbed to their injuries a month later. All the victims were senior citizens from the small village of Saint-Bernard, except for the 29-year-old bus driver, who was from Sherbrooke.

== Inquiry ==
An inquiry into the crash was ordered by the Government of Quebec and was headed by coroner Luc Malouin, but the provincial government immediately announced plans to rebuild the road to improve safety by relocating it and eliminating the sharp curve. The cause of the crash was determined to be brake failure - the coroner determined that brakes only had 30 percent of their braking capacity, and that André Mercier, owner of the bus company Autobus Mercier, was not competent in managing his bus fleet. Also contributing to the crash was the driver's exhaustion: he had less than 5 hours of sleep the night before, and had been putting in over-50-hour work-weeks. On March 23, 1999, the coroner released his final report on the crash, maintaining his initial conclusions. He made several recommendations, but rebuilding the road was not among them.

== Controversy ==
Litigation by environmental groups who contested the government decision not to hold consultations and studies regarding the environmental impact of the work resulted in a one-year delay before road work could begin. Work began on June 7, 1999. Because the coroner had made no recommendations regarding the road, the government was criticized for spending public money in a wasteful manner.

== Road improvements ==
The road is now separated with a Jersey barrier and the slope has been reduced on the hill. All vehicles are required to stop before proceeding down the hill, and commercial vehicles are required to verify the correct operation of their brakes.

There were plans to build a lookout which would include an official memorial near the location of the crash, providing a safe location for motorists who wish to visit the site. By 2009, the lookout was complete and in use. There is a memorial for the victims, and the lookout offers a view on l'Île-aux-Coudres shoulder.

== See also ==
- List of road accidents
- List of deadliest Canadian traffic accidents

== Notes ==
All links retrieved on November 3, 2006.
