= Webb, Saskatchewan =

Village in Saskatchewan, Canada

Village of Webb
- Village
- Location within Saskatchewan Location within Canada
- Coordinates: 50°10′57″N 108°12′22″W
- Country: Canada
- Province: Saskatchewan
- Census division: 8
- Rural municipality: Webb No. 138
- Post office founded: N/A
- Incorporated (village): June 18, 1910
- Incorporated (town): N/A

Government
  - Mayor: John Martens
  - Administrator: Connie A. Sorenson
  - Governing body: Webb Village Council

Area
  - Total: 1.41 km^{2} (0.54 sq mi)

Population (2021)
  - Total: 71
  - Density: 57.7/km^{2} (149/sq mi)
- Time zone: CST
- Postal code: S0N 2X0
- Area code: 306
- Highways: Highway 1 (TCH) / Highway 632

Webb (2021 population: 71) is a village in the Canadian province of Saskatchewan within the Rural Municipality of Webb No. 138 and Census Division No. 8.

== History ==
Webb incorporated as a village on June 18, 1910.

The 1980 CP Rail crew bus crash killed 22 men.

== Demographics ==
Population history (1981–2016)
Year	Pop.	±%
1981	80	—
1986	87	+8.7%
1991	64	−26.4%
1996	42	−34.4%
2001	51	+21.4%
2006	44	−13.7%
2011	58	+31.8%
2016	50	−13.8%
2021	71	+42.0%
Source: Statistics Canada via Saskatchewan Bureau of Statistics

In the 2021 Census of Population conducted by Statistics Canada, Webb had a population of 71 living in 33 of its 43 total private dwellings, a change of 42% from its 2016 population of 50. With a land area of 1.23 km^{2} (0.47 sq mi), it had a population density of 57.7/km^{2} (149.5/sq mi) in 2021.

In the 2016 Census of Population, the Village of Webb recorded a population of 50 living in 24 of its 26 total private dwellings, a −16% change from its 2011 population of 58. With a land area of 1.41 km^{2} (0.54 sq mi), it had a population density of 35.5/km^{2} (91.8/sq mi) in 2016.

== See also ==
- List of communities in Saskatchewan
- List of villages in Saskatchewan
- Paradise Hill Airport
