= Cormier-Village, New Brunswick =

Rural community in New Brunswick, Canada

Coordinates: 46°10′19″N 64°21′6.8″W

Cormier-Village is a Canadian rural community located in Westmorland County, New Brunswick. It is administratively part of the Rural Community of Beaubassin East.

== History ==
This community is the site of the Cormier-Village hayride accident, which occurred on October 8, 1989, and resulted in the deaths of 13 people and 45 people suffering injuries.

== See also ==
- List of communities in New Brunswick
- Cormier Aerodrome
