= 1989 Cormier-Village hayride accident =

New Brunswick Accident In 1989

Coordinates: 46.1719°N 64.3519°W

- Date: October 8, 1989
- Time: afternoon
- Location: New Brunswick Route 945 in Cormier-Village, New Brunswick
- Deaths: 13
- Injuries: 45

The Cormier-Village hayride accident occurred in the Canadian rural community of Cormier-Village, New Brunswick, 10 km (6.2 mi) west of Cap-Pelé and 22 km (14 mi) east of Shediac.

== Accident ==
On the afternoon of Sunday, October 8, 1989, the members of the McGraw and Léger families were participating in a hayride, travelling in a wagon pulled by a farm tractor, as well as two following pickup trucks, along the shoulder of Route 945. They were approximately 100 m (330 ft) from the end of the ride at a community hall in Cormier-Village where they had planned a family reunion as part of their celebration of Thanksgiving Weekend.

The driver of a tractor trailer (logging truck) hauling a 6-tonne load of hardwood logs cut into 20 ft (6.1 m) lengths lost control as he passed, resulting in the entire load of logs tipping onto the tractor, wagon, and pickup trucks. 13 people were killed and 45 injured with many victims pinned and crushed; five children were among those who died.

Emergency responders from the RCMP in Shediac, volunteer fire fighters from Cap-Pelé and numerous ambulance paramedics from across Westmorland County responded. Victims were transported to tertiary care hospitals in Moncton, approximately 45 km (28 mi) away.

== Response ==
The horror of this accident, both for survivors and emergency responders, resulted in the Government of New Brunswick forming a provincial Critical Incident Stress Management Team.
