= Knight Lake (Timiskaming District) =

Lake in Ontario, Canada

- Location in Ontario
- Location: Lee Township, Timiskaming District, Ontario
- Coordinates: 48°12′48″N 80°21′58″W
- Part of: James Bay drainage basin
- Basin countries: Canada
- Max. length: 1,080 m (3,540 ft)
- Max. width: 520 m (1,710 ft)
- Surface elevation: 337 metres (1,106 ft)

Knight Lake is a lake in geographic Lee Township in the Unorganized West Part of Timiskaming District, in northeastern Ontario, Canada. The lake is in the James Bay drainage basin and the nearest community is Sesekinika, 9.8 kilometres (6.1 mi) to the east.

The lake is about 1,080 metres (3,540 ft) long and 520 metres (1,710 ft) wide. There are three unnamed inflows at the south, northwest and north. The primary outflow, at the east, is an unnamed creek that flows to Sarsfield Creek between the outflow from Sarsfield Lake upstream and the inflow of Tomwool Creek downstream. Sarsfield Creek flows via Meyers Lake, Woollings Creek, the Whiteclay River, the Black River, the Abitibi River and the Moose River to James Bay.
