= Arras Lake =

Lake in Ontario, Canada

- Location in Ontario
- Location: Lee Township, Timiskaming District, Ontario
- Coordinates: 48°15′44″N 80°22′12″W
- Part of: James Bay drainage basin
- Primary inflows: Tomwool Creek
- Primary outflows: Tomwool Creek
- Basin countries: Canada
- Max. length: 420 m (1,380 ft)
- Max. width: 350 m (1,150 ft)
- Surface elevation: 343 metres (1,125 ft)

Arras Lake is a small lake in geographic Lee Township in the Unorganized West Part of Timiskaming District, in northeastern Ontario, Canada. The lake is in the James Bay drainage basin and is on Tomwool Creek. The nearest community is Bourkes, 11 kilometres (7 mi) to the northeast.

The lake is about 420 metres (1,380 ft) long and 350 metres (1,150 ft) wide. The primary inflow, at the west, is Tomwool Creek arriving from Burl Lakes. The primary outflow, at the south, is also Tomwool Creek, which heads south to Tomwool Lake. Tomwwool Creek flows via Sarsfield Creek, Meyers Lake, Woollings Creek, the Whiteclay River, the Black River, the Abitibi River and the Moose River to James Bay.
