= Cariad Lake =

Lake in Ontario, Canada

- Location in Ontario
- Location: Cochrane District and Timiskaming District, Ontario
- Coordinates: 48°16′45″N 80°22′55″W
- Part of: James Bay drainage basin
- Primary outflows: Tomwool Creek
- Basin countries: Canada
- Max. length: 880 m (2,890 ft)
- Max. width: 300 m (980 ft)
- Surface elevation: 345 metres (1,132 ft)
- Islands: 1

Cariad Lake is a small lake in Cochrane District and Timiskaming District, in northeastern Ontario, Canada. The lake is in the James Bay drainage basin and is the source of Tomwool Creek. The nearest community is Bourkes, 11.5 kilometres (7 mi) to the east northeast.

Almost the entire lake is in geographic Black Township in the municipality of Black River-Matheson, Cochrane District; only a tiny sliver of southwest of the lake is in geographic Lee Township in the Unorganized West Part of Timiskaming District.

The lake is about 880 metres (2,890 ft) long and 300 metres (980 ft) wide. It has one unnamed island at the northwest. There is one unnamed inflow at the west. The primary outflow, at the southeast, is Tomwool Creek, which heads south to Verona Lake. Tomwwool Creek flows via Sarsfield Creek, Meyers Lake, Woollings Creek, the Whiteclay River, the Black River, the Abitibi River and the Moose River to James Bay.

== See also ==
- List of lakes in Ontario
