= Verona Lake (Timiskaming District) =

Lake in Timiskaming District, Ontario, Canada

- Location in Ontario
- Location: Lee Township, Timiskaming District, Ontario
- Coordinates: 48°16′19″N 80°22′29″W
- Part of: James Bay drainage basin
- Primary inflows: Tomwool Creek
- Primary outflows: Tomwool Creek
- Basin countries: Canada
- Max. length: 1,100 m (3,600 ft)
- Max. width: 530 m (1,740 ft)
- Surface area: 40.67 ha (100.5 acres)
- Surface elevation: 343 metres (1,125 ft)

Verona Lake is a small lake in geographic Lee Township in the Unorganized West Part of Timiskaming District, in northeastern Ontario, Canada. The lake is in the James Bay drainage basin and is on Tomwool Creek. The nearest community is Bourkes, 11 kilometres (7 mi) to the northeast.

The lake is about 1,100 metres (3,610 ft) long and 530 metres (1,740 ft) wide. The primary inflows, at the north, is Tomwool Creek arriving from Cariad Lake. The primary outflow, at the southeast, is also Tomwool Creek, which heads east to Burl Lakes. Tomwwool Creek flows via Sarsfield Creek, Meyers Lake, Woollings Creek, the Whiteclay River, the Black River, the Abitibi River and the Moose River to James Bay.
