= Burl Lakes =

Lake in Timiskaming District, Ontario, Canada

- Location in Ontario
- Location: Lee Township, Timiskaming District, Ontario
- Coordinates: 48°16′03″N 80°22′02″W
- Part of: James Bay drainage basin
- Primary inflows: Tomwool Creek
- Primary outflows: Tomwool Creek
- Basin countries: Canada
- Max. length: 660 m (2,170 ft)
- Max. width: 190 m (620 ft)
- Surface area: 8.78 ha (21.7 acres)
- Surface elevation: 343 metres (1,125 ft)
- Islands: 1

Burl Lakes is a small lake in geographic Lee Township in the Unorganized West Part of Timiskaming District, in northeastern Ontario, Canada. The lake is in the James Bay drainage basin and is on Tomwool Creek. The nearest community is Bourkes, 10.7 kilometres (6.6 mi) to the northeast.

The lake is about 660 metres (2,170 ft) long and 190 metres (620 ft) wide. It has one unnamed island at the north. The primary inflow, at the west, is Tomwool Creek arriving from Verona Lake. The primary outflow, at the south, is also Tomwool Creek, which heads south to Arras Lake. Tomwwool Creek flows via Sarsfield Creek, Meyers Lake, Woollings Creek, the Whiteclay River, the Black River, the Abitibi River and the Moose River to James Bay.
