= Tomwool Lake =

Lake in Timiskaming District, Ontario, Canada

- Location in Ontario
- Location: Lee Township, Timiskaming District, Ontario
- Coordinates: 48°15′19″N 80°22′00″W
- Part of: James Bay drainage basin
- Primary inflows: Tomwool Creek
- Primary outflows: Tomwool Creek
- Basin countries: Canada
- Max. length: 1,170 m (3,840 ft)
- Max. width: 270 m (890 ft)
- Surface area: 8.78 ha (21.7 acres)
- Surface elevation: 342 metres (1,122 ft)

Tomwool Lake is a small lake in geographic Lee Township in the Unorganized West Part of Timiskaming District, in northeastern Ontario, Canada. The lake is in the James Bay drainage basin and is on Tomwool Creek. The nearest community is Bourkes, 10.9 kilometres (6.8 mi) to the northeast.

The lake is about 1,170 metres (3,840 ft) long and 270 metres (890 ft) wide. The primary inflow, at the west, is Tomwool Creek arriving from Arras Lake. There are secondary inflows at the west and east. The primary outflow, at the south, is also Tomwool Creek, which heads south. Tomwwool Creek flows via Sarsfield Creek, Meyers Lake, Woollings Creek, the Whiteclay River, the Black River, the Abitibi River and the Moose River to James Bay.
