= Benoit Creek (Ontario) =

- Location of the mouth of Benoit Creek in Ontario

Location
- Country: Canada
- Province: Ontario
- Region: Northeastern Ontario
- Districts: Timiskaming; Cochrane

Physical characteristics
- Source: Benoit Lake
  - location: Black River-Matheson, Cochrane District
  - coordinates: 48°18′13″N 80°17′07″W
  - elevation: 328 m (1,076 ft)
- Mouth: Meyers Lake
  - location: Lee Township, Timiskaming District
  - coordinates: 48°16′24″N 80°16′54″W
  - elevation: 313 m (1,027 ft)

Basin features
- River system: James Bay drainage basin

Benoit Creek is a creek in Timiskaming District and Cochrane District in northeastern Ontario, Canada. It is in the James Bay drainage basin and is a left tributary of Woollings Creek.

The creek begins at Benoit Lake in geographic Black Township in the municipality of Black River-Matheson, Cochrane District and flows south to its mouth at Meyers Lake in geographic Lee Township in the Unorganized West Part of Timiskaming District. Meyers Lake flows via Woollings Creek, the Whiteclay River, the Black River, the Abitibi River and the Moose River to James Bay.

The creek travels through no communities; the nearest is Bourkes, 4.6 kilometres (2.9 mi) northeast of the mouth of the creek.
