= Tomwool Creek =

- Location of the mouth of Tomwool Creek in Ontario

Location
- Country: Canada
- Province: Ontario
- Region: Northeastern Ontario
- Districts: Timiskaming; Cochrane

Physical characteristics
- Source: Cariad Lake
  - location: Black River-Matheson, Cochrane District
  - coordinates: 48°16′35″N 80°22′36″W
  - elevation: 345 m (1,132 ft)
- Mouth: Sarsfield Creek
  - location: Lee Township, Timiskaming District
  - coordinates: 48°13′25″N 80°21′37″W
  - elevation: 331 m (1,086 ft)

Basin features
- River system: James Bay drainage basin

Tomwool Creek is a creek in Timiskaming District and Cochrane District in northeastern Ontario, Canada. It is in the James Bay drainage basin and is a left tributary of Sarsfield Creek.

== Course ==
The creek begins at the outflow from Cariad Lake in geographic Black Township in the municipality of Black River-Matheson, Cochrane District and heads south immediately into geographic Lee Township in the Unorganized West Part of Timiskaming District to reach Verona Lake. It heads east into Burl Lakes, then south through Arras Lake to Tomwool Lake. The creek continues south to reach its mouth at Sarsfield Creek. Sarsfield Creek flows via Meyers Lake, Woollings Creek, the Whiteclay River, the Black River, the Abitibi River and the Moose River to James Bay.

The creek travels through no communities; the nearest is Sesekinika, 9 kilometres (5.6 mi) southeast of the mouth of the creek.
