= Sarsfield Lake =

Lake in Timiskaming District, Ontario, Canada

- Location in Ontario
- Location: Lee Township, Timiskaming District, Ontario
- Coordinates: 48°12′16″N 80°21′33″W
- Part of: James Bay drainage basin
- Primary inflows: Sarsfield Creek
- Primary outflows: Sarsfield Creek
- Basin countries: Canada
- Max. length: 1.06 km (0.66 mi)
- Max. width: 0.65 km (0.40 mi)
- Surface elevation: 336 metres (1,102 ft)

Sarsfield Lake is a small lake in Lee Township, Timiskaming District, in northeastern Ontario, Canada. The lake is in the James Bay drainage basin and the nearest community is Sesekinika, 9 kilometres (6 mi) to the east.

The lake is about 1,060 metres (3,478 ft) long and 650 metres (2,133 ft) wide. The primary inflow, at the south, is Sarsfield Creek arriving from Gould Lake. The primary outflow, at the north, is also Sarsfield Creek, which heads north. Sarsfield Creek flows via Meyers Lake, Woollings Creek, the Whiteclay River, the Black River, the Abitibi River and the Moose River to James Bay.
