= Ellis Lake (Timiskaming District) =

Lake in Timiskaming District, Ontario, Canada

- Location in Ontario
- Location: Bompas Township, Timiskaming District, Ontario
- Coordinates: 48°11′05″N 80°21′06″W
- Part of: James Bay drainage basin
- Primary inflows: Sarsfield Creek
- Primary outflows: Sarsfield Creek
- Basin countries: Canada
- Surface elevation: 339 metres (1,112 ft)

Ellis Lake is a lake in geographic Bompas Township, Timiskaming District, in northeastern Ontario, Canada. The lake is in the James Bay drainage basin. The nearest community is Sesekinika, 8.5 kilometres (5.3 mi) to the east. The lake is about 500 metres (1,600 ft) in diameter.

The primary inflow, at the south, is Sarsfield Creek, arriving from Little Sarsfield Lake. The primary outflow, at the north, is also Sarsfield Creek, which heads north to the adjacent Gould Lake. Sarsfield Creek flows via Meyers Lake, Woollings Creek, the Whiteclay River, the Black River, the Abitibi River and the Moose River to James Bay.

== See also ==
- List of lakes of Ontario
