= Little Sarsfield Lake =

Lake in Timiskaming District, Ontario, Canada

- Location in Ontario
- Location: Bompas Township, Timiskaming District, Ontario
- Coordinates: 48°09′35″N 80°20′33″W
- Part of: James Bay drainage basin
- Primary outflows: Sarsfield Creek
- Basin countries: Canada
- Max. length: 1.0 km (0.62 mi)
- Max. width: 0.2 km (0.12 mi)
- Surface elevation: 351 metres (1,152 ft)

Little Sarsfield Lake is a small lake in geographic Bompas Township in the Unorganized West Part of Timiskaming District, in northeastern Ontario, Canada. The lake is in the James Bay drainage basin and is the source of Sarsfield Creek.

The lake is about 1,000 metres (3,281 ft) long and 200 metres (656 ft) wide, and has no significant inflows. The primary outflow is Sarsfield Creek, which flows via Woollings Creek, the Whiteclay River, the Black River, the Abitibi River and the Moose River to James Bay.

The nearest community is Sesekinika, 10 kilometres (6 mi) to the northeast.
