= Wolf Creek (Timiskaming District) =

- Location of the mouth of Wolf Creek in Ontario

Location
- Country: Canada
- Province: Ontario
- Region: Northeastern Ontario
- District: Timiskaming
- Geographic township: Maisonville

Physical characteristics
- Source: Unnamed marsh
  - coordinates: 48°13′26″N 80°10′02″W
  - elevation: 319 m (1,047 ft)
- Mouth: Whiteclay River
  - coordinates: 48°16′33″N 80°14′34″W
  - elevation: 310 m (1,020 ft)

Basin features
- River system: James Bay drainage basin

Wolf Creek is a creek in geographic Maisonville Township in the Unorganized West Part of Timiskaming District in northeastern Ontario, Canada. It is in the James Bay drainage basin and is a right tributary of the Whiteclay River.

The creek begins at an unnamed marsh and flows north through Highspot Lake, then northeast through Goose Egg Lake to Wolf Lake. It continues northeast, passes under the Ontario Northland Railway (ONR) line, and reaches its mouth at the Whiteclay River. The Whiteclay River flows via the Black River, the Abitibi River and the Moose River to James Bay.

The creek travels through no communities; the nearest is Bourkes, 2.1 kilometres (1.3 mi) northeast of the mouth of the creek.
