= Gould Lake (Lee Township, Ontario) =

Lake in Ontario, Canada

- Location in Ontario
- Location: Timiskaming District, Ontario
- Coordinates: 48°11′25″N 80°21′15″W
- Part of: James Bay drainage basin
- Primary inflows: Sarsfield Creek
- Primary outflows: Sarsfield Creek
- Basin countries: Canada
- Surface elevation: 339 metres (1,112 ft)

Gould Lake is a lake mostly in geographic Lee Township, with a small part in geographic Bompas Township in Timiskaming District, in northeastern Ontario, Canada. The south of the lake is in Bompas Township, and the north in Lee Township. The lake is also in the James Bay drainage basin.

The primary inflow, at the south, is Sarsfield Creek, arriving from Ellis Lake. The primary outflow, at the north, is also Sarsfield Creek, which heads north to Sarsfield Lake. Sarsfield Creek flows via Meyers Lake, Woollings Creek, the Whiteclay River, the Black River, the Abitibi River and the Moose River to James Bay.

== See also ==
- List of lakes in Ontario
