= Cariad =

Cariad refer to:

- Cariad@iaith:love4language, a Welsh television series
- Cariad Cywir, a Welsh folk-song
- Cariad Lake, a lake in Canada
- Cariad Lloyd, a British performer
- Cariad SE, a software subsidiary of Volkswagen Group
- "Cariad", a single by Welsh indie band The Royston Club from Songs for the Spine, 2025
