= Ellis Lake (disambiguation) =

Ellis Lake is a man-made lake in Marysville, California.

Ellis Lake may also refer to:

== Canada ==
- Ellis Lake (Muskoka District), a lake of Ontario
- Ellis Lake (Priske Township, Thunder Bay District), a lake of Ontario
- Ellis Lake (Timiskaming District)
- Ellis Lake (Parry Sound District), a lake of Ontario
- Ellis Lake (Wabikoba Creek), a lake of Ontario

== United States ==
- A lake in Birch Township, Beltrami County, Minnesota
- A tributary of the Betsie River, Michigan
