= Swan Lake (Timiskaming District) =

Lake in Timiskaming District, Ontario, Canada

- Location in Ontario
- Location: Timiskaming District, Ontario
- Coordinates: 48°14′21″N 80°16′14″W
- Part of: James Bay drainage basin
- Primary inflows: Woollings Creek
- Primary outflows: Whiteclay River
- Basin countries: Canada
- Max. length: 1.7 km (1.1 mi)
- Max. width: 1.3 km (0.81 mi)
- Surface elevation: 312 metres (1,024 ft)

Swan Lake is a lake in geographic Lee Township and geographic Maisonville Township in the Unorganized West Part of Timiskaming District, in northeastern Ontario, Canada. The lake is in the James Bay drainage basin and the nearest community is Sesekinika, 4.9 kilometres (3.0 mi) to the northeast. Swan Lake is the location of the mouth of Woollings Creek and is the source of the Whiteclay River.

The western third of the lake is in Lee Township; the rest of the lake is in Maisonville Township.

The lake is about 1.7 kilometres (1.1 mi) long and 1.3 kilometres (0.8 mi) wide. The primary inflow is Woollings Creek arriving from Meyers Lake at north; there are two unnamed secondary inflows at the northwest and a third at the west. The primary outflow, at the east, is the Whiteclay River, which flows via the Black River, the Abitibi River and the Moose River to James Bay.

There is a private campsite/RV park suitable for recreational vehicles on the east side of the lake, accessible directly from Ontario Highway 11 just to the east.
