= Nausikaa Lake =

Lake in northeastern Ontario, Canada

- Location in Ontario
- Location: Lee Township, Timiskaming District, Ontario
- Coordinates: 48°11′52″N 80°18′02″W
- Etymology: Named for Nausicaa, a Greek princess in Homer's Odyssey
- Part of: Saint Lawrence River drainage basin
- Basin countries: Canada
- Max. length: 620 m (2,030 ft)
- Max. width: 340 m (1,120 ft)
- Surface elevation: 328 metres (1,076 ft)

Nausikaa Lake is a lake in geographic Lee Township in the Unorganized West Part of Timiskaming District, in northeastern Ontario, Canada. The lake is in the Saint Lawrence River drainage basin and the nearest community is Sesekinika, 5 kilometres (3.1 mi) to the east. It is named for Nausicaa, a Greek princess in Homer's Odyssey.

The lake is about 620 metres (2,030 ft) long and 340 metres (1,120 ft) wide. There is one unnamed inflow at the northwest. The primary outflow, at the northeast, is an unnamed creek that flows to Lillord Creek. Lillord Creek flows via the Blanche River, Lake Timiskaming and the Ottawa River to the Saint Lawrence River.
