= Disasters of the Century =

Canadian television series

- Genre: Documentary
- Country of origin: Canada
- No. of episodes: 47

Production
- Production company: Partners in Motion

Original release
- Network: History

Disasters of the Century is a documentary television series that airs on History Television. The program is produced by Regina, Saskatchewan-based Partners in Motion.

Each episode documents two different disasters from Canada and around the world, using a mixture of re-enactments, photographs, and interviews with survivors and family members of victims. Some episodes deal with broader topics concerning disaster. For example, Washed Away investigates the destruction that water can cause, by looking at several disasters.

== Episodes ==
The following is an incomplete list of episodes, based on the information currently available:

Episode	Title	Event	Year
S1.E1	Living on the Edge	1903 Frank Slide, 1914 Hillcrest mine disaster	2000
S1.E2	Black Week	During the week of 9-17 October 1913, known as Black Week, four disasters happen which include the loss of the SS Volturno, the Liverpool train collision, the Senghenydd mine collapse, and the Johannisthal air disaster.	2002
S1.E3	Nature's Fury	1912 Regina Cyclone, 1974 Super Outbreak	2001
S1.E4	Washed Away	1960 Great Chilean tsunami, 1954 Hurricane Hazel	2001
S1.E5	Out of Control	1949 SS Noronic fire, 1942 Cocoanut Grove fire	2001
S1.E6	Human Error	1917 Halifax Explosion, 1955 24 Hours of Le Mans crash	2002
S1.E7	From the Inside Out	1902 Mount Pelée eruption, 1953 Tangiwai disaster	2002
S1.E8	Critical Mass	1919 Boston Molasses disaster, 1907 Quebec Bridge collapse	2001
S1.E9	Lost at Sea	1939 HMS Thetis sinking, 1967 USS Forrestal fire	2002
S1.E10	It Came from the Sky	1945 Empire State Building crash, 1954 crash of Trans-Canada Air Lines Flight 9	2001
S1.E11	Final Destination	1944 Balvano train disaster, 1947 Dugald rail accident	2000
S1.E12	In an Instant	1910 Rogers Pass avalanche, 1963 Vajont Dam disaster	2002
S1.E13	When the Earth Moves	1923 Great Kantō earthquake, 1972 Nicaragua earthquake	2002
S1.E14	Up in Flames	1916 Matheson Fire, 1960 Windsor Gas Explosion	2003
S1.E15	Lost in Transit	1978 Eastman Bus Tragedy, 1956 Crash at Villa St. Louis Convent	2003
S1.E16	Eye of the Storm	1913 Great Lakes Storm of 1913, 1914 Newfoundland Sealing disaster	2003
S1.E17	Death by Water	1921 Britannia Beach flood, 1958 Second Narrows Bridge collapse	2003
S1.E18	Communities Under Siege	1958 Springhill mining disaster, 1929 Grand Banks tsunami	2003
S1.E19	Death and Profits	1958 Springhill mining disaster (Previously aired in Communities Under Siege), 1911 Triangle Shirtwaist Factory Fire	2005
S1.E20	When Laughter Turns to Tears	1944 Hartford Circus Fire, 1922 Knickerbocker Theater Collapse	2005
S1.E21	From Above	1968 Allegheny Airlines Flight 736 crash, 1956 Crash at Villa St. Louis Convent (Previously aired in Lost in Transit)	2005
S1.E22	The Wrong Choice	1978 Eastman Bus Tragedy, (Previously aired in Lost in Transit), 1937 New London Consolidated School Disaster	2005
S1.E23	Loki's Revenge	1939 Black Friday Bush Fires, 1960 Windsor Gas Explosion (Previously aired in Up in Flames)	2005
S1.E24	Industrial Nightmares	1921 BASF fertilizer factory explosion, 1930 Meuse Valley fog	2005
S1.E25	All Fall Down	1959 Malpasset Dam disaster, 1958 Second Narrows Bridge collapse (Previously aired in Death by Water)	2005
S1.E26	By Their Own Doing	1942 Queen Mary/Curacoa collision, 1914 Newfoundland Sealing disaster (Previously aired in Eye of the Storm)	2005
S1.E27	Rising From The Ashes	1953 North Sea flood, 1954 Blons avalanches	2005
S1.E28	Stormy Waters	1913 Lake Huron Storm, 1935 Labor Day hurricane	2005
S1.E29	Homes Swept Away	1921 Britannia Beach flood (Previously aired in Death by Water), 1974 Cyclone Tracy	2005
S1.E30	Islands Under Attack	1965 Taal Volcano euroption, 1929 Grand Banks earthquake	2005
S1.E31	Deadly Elements	1916 Matheson Fire (Previously aired in Up in Flames), 1972 Black Hills flood	2005
S1.E32	No Survivors	1998 Swissair crash, 1918 SS Princess Sophia sinking	2005
S1.E33	Friends and Family	1982 Ocean Ranger disaster, 2003 Hurricane Juan	2005
S1.E34	Collision Course	1942 USS Truxtun/USS Pollux/USS Wilkes disaster, 1978 Cranbrook Air Crash	2004
S1.E35	Fire and Ice	2003 Okanagan Mountain Park Fire, 1944 Toronto Snow Storm	2005
S1.E36	Against the Elements	1959 Battery Snowslide, 2000 Pine Lake Tornado	2004
S1.E37	Death in a Small Town	1971 St. Jean Vianney Mudslide, 1997 St. Joseph Bus Crash	2004
S1.E38	End of the Line	1986 Hinton Train Crash, 1989 Dryden Air Crash	2004
S1.E39	Life in Disaster Row	1950 Red River Flood, 1946 Windsor–Tecumseh, Ontario tornado	2004
S1.E40	Head On	1918 SS Florizel disaster, 1992 Westray Mine disaster	2006
S1.E41	Full Stop	1914 RMS Empress of Ireland/SS Storstad disaster, 1957 Maritime Central Airways Flight 315 crash	2006
S1.E42	Out of the Blue	1972 Blue Bird Café fire, 1970 Air Canada Flight 621 crash	2006
S1.E43	Safe Passage	1931 SS Viking disaster, 1946 DC-4 crash	2006
S1.E44	Coast To Coast	1900 Galveston hurricane, 1962 Typhoon Freda	2006
S1.E45	In the Blink of an Eye	1959 Escuminac disaster, 1943 Flora Alberta disaster	2006
S1.E46	Soldiers at Rest	1942 Knights of Columbus Hostel fire 1950 Canoe River train crash	2006
S1.E47	Frozen Hell	1941 Granduc Mine disaster, 1965 Granduc Avalanche	2006
