= Brigus Gold =

Former mining company of Canada

Brigus Gold Corporation was a Canadian mining company. The company was based in Halifax, Nova Scotia Canada and operated Black Fox Mine and Mill in the Timmins Gold District of Ontario. The Black Fox Complex encompasses the Black Fox Mine, the new Grey Fox property and adjoining properties in the Township of Black River-Matheson, Ontario, Canada. The Black Fox Mine is in production and the Grey Fox Mine, located four kilometres from Black Fox is in development.

The company was originally incorporated in 1936, in the province of Ontario. In 2003, the company was reorganized under the laws of the Yukon Territories.

In 2014 the company was acquired by Primero Mining Corp.

The company, then known as "Apollo Gold", was formed in the mid-1990s when Pegasus Gold declared bankruptcy and transferred its profitable assets to Apollo Gold. Pegasus Gold wanted to avoid paying for the clean-up of its Zortman-Landusky mine. The directors of Pegasus Gold and Apollo Gold were the same people at the time. This has been cited as an example of corporate environmental irresponsibility and unsustainable practices of mining companies at the expense of local people and environments.
