= Lillord Lake =

Lake in Timiskaming District, Ontario, Canada

- Location in Ontario
- Location: Lee Township, Timiskaming District, Ontario
- Coordinates: 48°12′32″N 80°18′15″W
- Part of: Saint Lawrence River drainage basin
- Primary outflows: Lillord Creek
- Basin countries: Canada
- Max. length: 720 m (2,360 ft)
- Max. width: 470 m (1,540 ft)
- Surface elevation: 324 metres (1,063 ft)

Lillord Lake is a lake in geographic Lee Township in the Unorganized West Part of Timiskaming District, in northeastern Ontario, Canada. The lake is in the Saint Lawrence River drainage basin and is the source of Lillord Creek. The nearest community is Sesekinika, 5.2 kilometres (3.2 mi) to the east.

The lake is about 720 metres (2,360 ft) long and 470 metres (1,540 ft) wide. There are four unnamed inflows at the south, west, north and northeast. The primary outflow, at the southeast, is Lillord Creek, which flows southeast to Berube Lake on the way to its mouth at the Blanche River. The Blanche River flows via Lake Timiskaming and the Ottawa River to the Saint Lawrence River.
