= Berube Lake =

Lake in Timiskaming District, Ontario, Canada

- Location in Ontario
- Location: Lee Township, Timiskaming District, Ontario
- Coordinates: 48°12′17″N 80°18′00″W
- Part of: Saint Lawrence River drainage basin
- Primary inflows: Lillord Creek
- Primary outflows: Lillord Creek
- Basin countries: Canada
- Max. length: 460 m (1,510 ft)
- Max. width: 280 m (920 ft)
- Surface elevation: 323 metres (1,060 ft)

Berube Lake is a lake in geographic Lee Township in the Unorganized West Part of Timiskaming District, in northeastern Ontario, Canada. The lake is in the Saint Lawrence River drainage basin and is on Lillord Creek. The nearest community is Sesekinika, 5 kilometres (3.1 mi) to the east.

The lake is about 460 metres (1,510 ft) long and 280 metres (920 ft) wide. The primary inflow is Lillord Creek arriving at the northwest from Lillord Lake. There is a secondary inflow at the southeast. The primary outflow, at the northeast, is Lillord Creek, which flows southeast on the way to its mouth at the Blanche River. The Blanche River flows via Lake Timiskaming and the Ottawa River to the Saint Lawrence River.
