= Bolton Lake (Cochrane District) =

Lake in Cochrane District, Ontario, Canada

- Location in Ontario
- Location: Black River-Matheson, Cochrane District, Ontario
- Coordinates: 48°24′02″N 80°15′48″W
- Part of: James Bay drainage basin
- Primary outflows: Burdick creek to the Black River
- Basin countries: Canada
- Max. length: 1.2 km (0.75 mi)
- Max. width: 0.81 km (0.50 mi)
- Surface elevation: 288 m (945 ft)

Bolton Lake is a lake in the James Bay drainage basin in the municipality of Black River-Matheson in Cochrane District, Ontario, Canada. It is about 1,200 metres (3,937 ft) long and 800 metres (2,625 ft) wide, and lies at an elevation of 288 metres (945 ft) near the community of Wavell, 1.3 kilometres (0.8 mi) northeast of Ontario Highway 11 and the Ontario Northland Railway main line, and 33 kilometres (21 mi) northwest of the town of Kirkland Lake. The primary outflow is Burdick creek to the Black River, which flows via the Abitibi River and the Moose River to James Bay.

== See also ==
- List of lakes in Ontario
