= List of lakes of Ontario: E =

This is a list of lakes of Ontario beginning with the letter E.

== Ea ==
- Eabamet Lake
- Eade Lake (Sudbury District)
- Eade Lake (Cochrane District)
- Eady Lake
- Eadys Lake (Whitewater Region)
- Eadys Lake (North Algona Wilberforce)
- Eag Lake
- Eager Lake
- Eagle Lake (Machar)
- Eagle Lake (Cole Township, Timiskaming District)
- Eagle Lake (Frontenac County)
- Eagle Lake (Cochrane District)
- Eagle Lake (Machin)
- Eagle Lake (Muskoka District)
- Eagle Lake (Carling)
- Eagle Lake (Algoma District)
- Eagle Lake (Bird River, Kenora District)
- Eagle Lake (Chown Township, Timiskaming District)
- Eagle Lake (Haliburton County)
- Eagle Rock Lake
- Eaglecrest Lake
- Eaglehead Lake
- Eaglenest Lake (Kenora District)
- Eaglenest Lake (Selkirk Township, Sudbury District)
- Eaglenest Lake (Sheppard Township, Sudbury District)
- Eaglerock Lake
- Eaglet Lake
- Eaket Lake
- Ear Lake (Algoma District)
- Ear Lake (Rainy River District)
- Earl Lake (Earl Township, Sudbury District)
- Earl Lake (Gallagher Township, Sudbury District)
- Earl's Lake
- Earley Lake
- Earls Lake
- Early Lake
- Earngey Lake
- Easen Lake
- Easey Lake
- East Ahmabel Lake
- East Alder Lake
- East Bass Lake
- East Bear Lake
- East Bouchard Lake
- East Bradburn Lake
- East Brophy Lake
- East Bruce Lake
- East Buck Lake
- East Caribou Lake
- East Carty Lake
- East Chaplin Lake
- East Coyle Lake
- East Cranberry Pond
- East Cypress Lake
- East Divide Lake
- East Dog Lake
- East Dundonald Lake
- East Emerson Lake
- East End Lake
- East Fox Lake
- East Galipo Lake
- East Godson Lake
- East Hardtack Lake
- East Hillsport Lake
- East Hopian Lake
- East Howry Lake
- East Jeannie Lakes
- East Jones Lake
- East Ketchikan Lake
- East Kidd Lake
- East Lake (Troutlake River, Kenora District)
- East Lake (Loach Township, Algoma District)
- East Lake (Wardle Township, Algoma District)
- East Lake (Haliburton County)
- East Lake (Wild Lake, Kenora District)
- East Lake (Rainy River District)
- East Lake (Joint Lake, Kenora District)
- East Lake (Prince Edward County)
- East Lake (Grenoble Township, Algoma District)
- East Legge Lake
- East Lily Lake
- East Mageau Lake
- East Mattawishkwia Lake
- East Middleton Lake
- East Montreuil Lake
- East Moore Lake
- East Moose Lake
- East Moseau Lake
- East Neely Lake
- East Night Hawk Lake
- East Oscar Lake
- East Paint Lake
- East Pashkokogan Lake
- East Percy Lake
- East Plover Lake
- East Pond
- East Pukaskwa Lake
- East Revell Lake
- East Rufus Lake
- East Ryan Lake
- East Shesheb Lake
- East Shining Tree Lake
- East Solomon Lake
- East Soucie Lake
- East Stewart Lake
- East Thompson Lake
- East Tommy Lake
- East Totten Lake
- East Trump Lake
- East Twin Lake (Peterborough County)
- East Twin Lake (Algoma District)
- East Wakami Lake
- East West Lake
- East Whitefish Lake
- East-West Beaver Ponds
- Eastbrook Lake
- Eastell Lake
- Easter Chicken Lake
- Easter Lake
- Eastern Lake (Simcoe County)
- Eastern Lake (Kenora District)
- Eastford Lake
- Eastman Lake
- Eastsand Lake
- Eastside Lake
- Eatlots Lake
- Eaton Lake (Thunder Bay District)
- Eaton Lake (Sudbury District)
- Eaton Lake (Muskoka District)
- Eau Sale Pond
- Eayrs Lake

== Eb–Ec ==
- Ebach Lake
- Ebba Lake
- Ebbs Lake
- Eber Pond
- Eberle Lake
- Ecar Lake
- Echo Lake (Grasett Township, Algoma District)
- Echo Lake (Marks Township, Thunder Bay District)
- Echo Lake (Lake of Bays)
- Echo Lake (Mickle Township, Timiskaming District)
- Echo Lake (Frontenac County)
- Echo Lake (Muskoka Lakes)
- Echo Lake (Hastings County)
- Echo Lake (Coldwell Township, Thunder Bay District)
- Echo Lake (Beauchamp Township, Timiskaming District)
- Echo Lake (Cochrane District)
- Echo Lake (Sudbury District)
- Echo Lake (Nipissing District)
- Echo Lake (Kenora District)
- Echo Lake (Kehoe Township, Algoma District)
- Echo Lake (Syine Township, Thunder Bay District)
- Echoing Lake
- Eckford Lake

== Ed ==
- Edar Lake
- Eddie Lake
- Eddies Lake
- Eden Lake (Kenora District)
- Eden Lake (Thunder Bay District)
- Eden Lake (Renfrew County)
- Eden Lake (Sudbury District)
- Edgar Lake (Timiskaming District)
- Edgar Lake (Nipissing District)
- Edgar Lake (Cochrane District)
- Edge Lake
- Edgecliff Lake
- Edgewood Lake
- Edhouse Lake
- Edinburgh Lake
- Edison Lake (Timiskaming District)
- Edison Lake (Algoma District)
- Edison Lake (Kenora District)
- Edith Lake (Greenstone)
- Edith Lake (Timiskaming District)
- Edith Lake (Flatrock Lake, Thunder Bay District)
- Edith Lake (Sudbury District)
- Edleston Lake
- Edmison Lake
- Edmond Lake
- Edmondson Lake
- Edmunds Lake
- Edna Lake (Thunder Bay District)
- Edna Lake (McCarthy Township, Sudbury District)
- Edna Lake (Frechette Township, Sudbury District)
- Edward Lake (Smellie Township, Kenora District)
- Edward Lake (Phairs Lake, Kenora District)
- Edward Lake (Renfrew County)
- Edward Lake (Hastings County)
- Edward Lake (Simcoe County)
- Edwards Lake (Timmins)
- Edwards Lake (Brigstocke Township, Timiskaming District)
- Edwards Lake (Sudbury District)
- Edwards Lake (Kirkland Lake)
- Edwards Lake (Nipissing District)
- Edwards Lake (Orkney Township, Cochrane District)
- Edwards Lake (Thunder Bay District)
- Edwin Lake

== Ee–Eg ==
- Eel Lake (Sudbury District)
- Eel Lake (Frontenac County)
- Eel Lake (Thunder Bay District)
- Eel Lake (Nipissing District)
- Eels Lake
- Eeyore Lake
- Efby Lake
- Effingham Lake
- Egan Lake (Hastings County)
- Egan Lake (Kenora District)
- Egg Lake (Gorham Township, Thunder Bay District)
- Egg Lake (Brothers Township, Thunder Bay District)
- Egg Lake (Kenora District)
- Egg Lake (Frontenac County)
- Egg Lake (Peterborough County)
- Egg Lake (Kenora District)
- Egret Lake

== Ei–Ek ==
- Eider Lake (Algoma District)
- Eider Lake (Kenora District)
- Eight Lake
- Eight Mile Pond
- Eighteen Mile Lake
- Eighteen Mile Pond
- Eighth Lake
- Eighty Acre Lake
- Eighty Four Lake
- Eileen Lake (Nipissing District)
- Eileen Lake (Algoma District)
- Eileen Lake (Thunder Bay District)
- Eiler Lake
- Einar Lake
- Eino Lake
- Eire Lake
- Eisen Lake
- Ekal Lake
- Ekip Lake
- Ekstrom Lake

== Ela–Ell ==
- Elam Lake
- Elboga Lake
- Elbow Lake (Hinchinbrooke Township, Central Frontenac)
- Elbow Lake (Esquega Township, Algoma District)
- Elbow Lake (Lyman Township, Nipissing District)
- Elbow Lake (Renfrew County)
- Elbow Lake (Rainy River District)
- Elbow Lake (Cleftrock Creek, Kenora District)
- Elbow Lake (South Frontenac)
- Elbow Lake (Sables-Spanish Rivers)
- Elbow Lake (Herbert Township, Nipissing District)
- Elbow Lake (Lahontan Township, Thunder Bay District)
- Elbow Lake (Jackson Lake, Thunder Bay District)
- Elbow Lake (Burwash Township, Sudbury District)
- Elbow Lake (Demorest Township, Sudbury District)
- Elbow Lake (Buckland Township, Sudbury District)
- Elbow Lake (Vermillion River, Kenora District)
- Elbow Lake (Huotari Township, Algoma District)
- Elbow Lake (Oso Township, Central Frontenac)
- Elbow Lake (Parry Sound District)
- Elbow Lake (Sayer Township, Algoma District)
- Elbow Lake (Shuniah)
- Elbow Lake (Lennox and Addington County)
- Elbow Lake (Abbey Township, Sudbury District)
- Elbow Lake (Balmoral River, Kenora District)
- Elbow Lake (Dorion)
- Elbow Lake (Arrow Lake, Thunder Bay District)
- Elbow Lake (French River)
- Elbow Lake (Elizabeth Township, Sudbury District)
- Eldee Lake
- Eldorado Lake (Hastings County)
- Eldorado Lake (Kenora District)
- Eldridge Lake
- Eleanor Lake (Renfrew County)
- Eleanor Lake (Timiskaming District)
- Eleanor Lake (Rainy River District)
- Eleanor Lake (Algoma District)
- Eleanor Lake (Cochrane District)
- Eleph Lake
- Elephant Head Lake
- Elephant Lake (Thunder Bay District)
- Elephant Lake (Haliburton County)
- Elephant Lake (Algoma District)
- Elevation Lake
- Elevator Lake
- Eleven Mile Lake
- Eleventh Lake
- Elf Lake (Thunder Bay District)
- Elf Lake (Cochrane District)
- Elf Lake (Algoma District)
- Elga Lake
- Elgie Lake
- Elgin Lake (Sudbury District)
- Elgin Lake (Thunder Bay District)
- Eli Lake (Sudbury District)
- Eli Lake (Rainy River District)
- Eli Lake (Thunder Bay District)
- Elinor Lake
- Elissa Lake
- Eliza Lake (Kenora District)
- Eliza Lake (Timiskaming District)
- Elizabeth Lake (Timiskaming District)
- Elizabeth Lake (Simpson Island, Thunder Bay District)
- Elizabeth Lake (Rainy River District)
- Elizabeth Lake (Algoma District)
- Elizabeth Lake (Sudbury District)
- Elizabeth Lake (Purdom Township, Thunder Bay District)
- Elizabeth Lakes
- Elk Lake (Thunder Bay District)
- Elk Lake (Timiskaming District)
- Elk Lake (Rainy River District)
- Elk Pit
- Elka Lake
- Elkhorn Lake
- Ell Lake
- Ella Lake (Valley East, Greater Sudbury)
- Ella Lake (Walden, Greater Sudbury)
- Ella Lake (Algoma District)
- Ellam Lake
- Ellard Lake
- Ellen Lake
- Ellery Lake
- Elliot Lake
- Elliott Lake
- Elliott's Lake
- Ellipse Lake
- Ellis Lake (Muskoka District)
- Ellis Lake (Priske Township, Thunder Bay District)
- Ellis Lake (Timiskaming District)
- Ellis Lake (Parry Sound District)
- Ellis Lake (Wabikoba Creek)
- Ellis Pond

== Elm–Elz ==
- Elm Lake (Thunder Bay District)
- Elm Lake (Peterborough County)
- Elma Lake
- Elmer Lake (Frost Township, Algoma District)
- Elmer Lake (Desbiens Township, Algoma District)
- Elmer Lake (Timiskaming District)
- Elmes Lake
- Elmhirst Lake
- Elmo Lake
- Lake Eloida
- Elongate Lake
- Elora Lake
- Elsbury Lake
- Elsie Lake (Timiskaming District)
- Elsie Lake (Ashley Township, Algoma District)
- Elsie Lake (Thunder Bay District)
- Elsie Lake (Nipissing District)
- Elsie Lake (Frost Township, Algoma District)
- Elsie Lake (Kenora District)
- Elson Lake
- Elspeth Lake
- Elspie Lake
- Eltrut Lake
- Elva Lake
- Elvira Lake
- Elvy Lake
- Elwood Lake (Eaton Creek, Thunder Bay District)
- Elwood Lake (Benner Township, Thunder Bay District)
- Ely Lake
- Elzevir Lake

== Em ==
- Emarton Lake
- Embarass Lake
- Embargo Lake
- Embee Lake
- Ember Lake (Sudbury District)
- Ember Lake (Timiskaming District)
- Embro Pond
- Embryo Lake
- Emens Lake
- Emerald Lake (Afton Township, Sudbury District)
- Emerald Lake (Nickle Township, Thunder Bay District)
- Emerald Lake (Rainy River District)
- Emerald Lake (Borden Township, Sudbury District)
- Emerald Lake (Nipissing District)
- Emerald Lake (Kenora District)
- Emerald Lake (Wellington County)
- Emerald Lake (Innes Township, Thunder Bay District)
- Emerald Lake (Blind River)
- Emerald Lake (Musquash Township, Algoma District)
- Emerson Lake (Rose Township, Algoma District)
- Emerson Lake (Kenora District)
- Emerson Lake (Bracci Township, Algoma District)
- Emery Lake
- Emil Lake
- Emilie Lake
- Emily Lake (Thunder Bay District)
- Emily Lake (Kawartha Lakes)
- Emily Lake (Algoma District)
- Emma Lake (Greater Sudbury)
- Emma Lake (Nipissing District)
- Emma Lake (Sudbury District)
- Emmanuel Lake
- Emmerson Lake
- Emmett Lake
- Emmons Lake (Kenora District)
- Emmons Lake (Sudbury District)
- Emms Lake
- Emond Lake (Algoma District)
- Emond Lake (Kenora District)
- Empey Lake
- Empire Lake (Kenora District)
- Empire Lake (Empire Creek, Thunder Bay District)
- Empire Lake (Greenstone)
- Empress Lake
- Emsdale Lake

== En–Ep ==
- Ena Lake
- Encamp Lake
- End Lake (Kenora District)
- End Lake (Algoma District)
- Endikai Lake
- Endleman Lake
- Endless Lake
- Endogoki Lake
- Endomink Lake
- Endospruce Lakes
- Endportage Lake
- Engineer Lake
- Engineers Lake
- Engler Lake
- English Lake (Kenora District)
- English Lake (Sudbury District)
- Enid Lake
- Enira Lake
- Ennis Lake
- Eno Lake
- Enrae Lake
- Enright Lake
- Ensign Lake
- Enterprise Lake
- Entwine Lake
- Eos Lake
- Eplett Lake

== Er ==
- Erables Lake
- Erato Lake
- Eric Lake (Black River, Thunder Bay District)
- Eric Lake (Algoma District)
- Eric Lake (Syine Township, Thunder Bay District)
- Eric Lake (Harris Lake, Kenora District)
- Eric Lake (Osnaburgh 63A)
- Eric Lake (Kenorain Creek, Kenora District)
- Erichsen Lake
- Erickson Lake
- Lake Erie
- Eris Lake
- Erkett's Pond
- Erly Lake
- Ermine Lake (Thunder Bay District)
- Ermine Lake (Algoma District)
- Ermine Lake (Nipissing District)
- Loch Erne
- Ernest Lake
- Ernie Lake
- Eros Lake
- Errett Lake
- Errey Lake
- Errington Lake
- Error Lake

== Es ==
- Escape Lake
- Eskay Lake
- Esker Lake (Nipissing District)
- Esker Lake (De Gaulle Township, Sudbury District)
- Esker Lake (Algoma District)
- Esker Lake (Marshay Township, Sudbury District)
- Esker Lake (Steel River, Thunder Bay District)
- Esker Lake (Elbow Lake, Thunder Bay District)
- Esker Lake (Kenora District)
- Esker Lake (Timiskaming District)
- Esker Lakes
- Eskimo Lake
- Eskwanonwatin Lake
- Esmee Lake
- Esnagami Lake
- Esnagi Lake
- Esox Lake
- Espaniel Lake
- Ess Lake (Thunder Bay District)
- Ess Lake (Algoma District)
- Essem Lake
- Essens Lake
- Esser Lake
- Esson Lake
- Esten Lake
- Esther Lake (Kenora District)
- Esther Lake (Sudbury District)
- Estrangement Lake

== Et–Eu ==
- Etamame Lake
- Ethel Lake (Sudbury District)
- Ethel Lake (Crooked Lake, Kenora District)
- Ethel Lake (Redditt Township, Kenora District)
- Ethelma Lake
- Ethier Lake (Sudbury District)
- Ethier Lake (Nipissing District)
- Ethlouise Lake
- Etna Lake
- Etta Lake (Kenora District)
- Etta Lake (Parry Sound District)
- Etwill Lake
- Eu Lake
- Eucalia Lake
- Euclide Lake
- Eugenia Lake
- Eula Lake
- Eureka Lake (Cochrane District)
- Eureka Lake (Sudbury District)
- Eustace Lake
- Eustache Lake

== Ev ==
- Eva Lake (Kenora District)
- Eva Lake (Thunder Bay District)
- Eva Lake (Rainy River District)
- Eva Lake (Algoma District)
- Evans Lake (Thunder Bay District)
- Evans Lake (Parry Sound District)
- Evans Lake (Elliot Lake)
- Evans Lake (Tupper Township, Algoma District)
- Evans Lake (Kenora District)
- Evans Lake (Hastings County)
- Eve Lake
- Evelyn Lake (Thunder Bay District)
- Evelyn Lake (Timmins)
- Evelyn Lake (Arnott Township, Algoma District)
- Evelyn Lake (Carney Township, Algoma District)
- Evelyn Lake (Sudbury District)
- Evelyn Lake (Cochrane)
- Even Lake
- Evening Lake
- Ever Lake
- Everest Lake
- Everett Lake (Timiskaming District)
- Everett Lake (Algoma District)
- Evonymus Lake

== Ew–Ez ==
- Ewart Lake
- Ewayea Lake
- Excalibur Lake
- Expanse Lake (Algoma District)
- Expanse Lake (Sudbury District)
- Expanse Lake (Timiskaming District)
- Expanse Lake (Kenora District)
- Expansion Lake
- Expectation Lake
- Exploration Lake
- Explorer Lake
- Export Lake
- Extension Lake
- Exton Lake
- Eyapamikama Lake
- Eye Lake (Rainy River District)
- Eye Lake (Kenora District)
- Eye Lake (Nipissing District)
- Eyelet Lake (Rainy River District)
- Eyelet Lake (Sudbury District)
- Eyelid Lake
- Eyes Lake
- Eyre Lake
- Ezma Lake
- Ezra Lake
