= Lee Township, Ontario =

Coordinates: 48°13′58″N 80°20′22″W

Lee Township is a geographic township in the Unorganized West Part of Timiskaming District in northeastern Ontario, Canada. The township has an off-grid community developing on the North West corner of Swan Lake, with approximately ten residents.

The northern border of the township forms part of the border between Timiskaming District and Cochrane District. The township is bordered on the north by the municipality of Black River-Matheson, Cochrane District; on the east by Maisonville Township; on the south by Bompas Township; and on the west by Terry Township.

Lee Township is home to Arras Lake, Berube Lake, Burl Lakes, Knight Lake, Lillord Lake, Nausikaa Lake, Sarsfield Lake, Tomwool Lake, and Verona Lake, and parts of Cariad Lake, Gould Lake, Meyers Lake and Swan Lake. Lillord Creek, Sarsfield Creek and Tomwool Creek flow all or in part through the township.

== See also ==
- List of townships in Ontario
