= Air Canada Flight 621 =

1970 plane crash in Brampton, Ontario, Canada

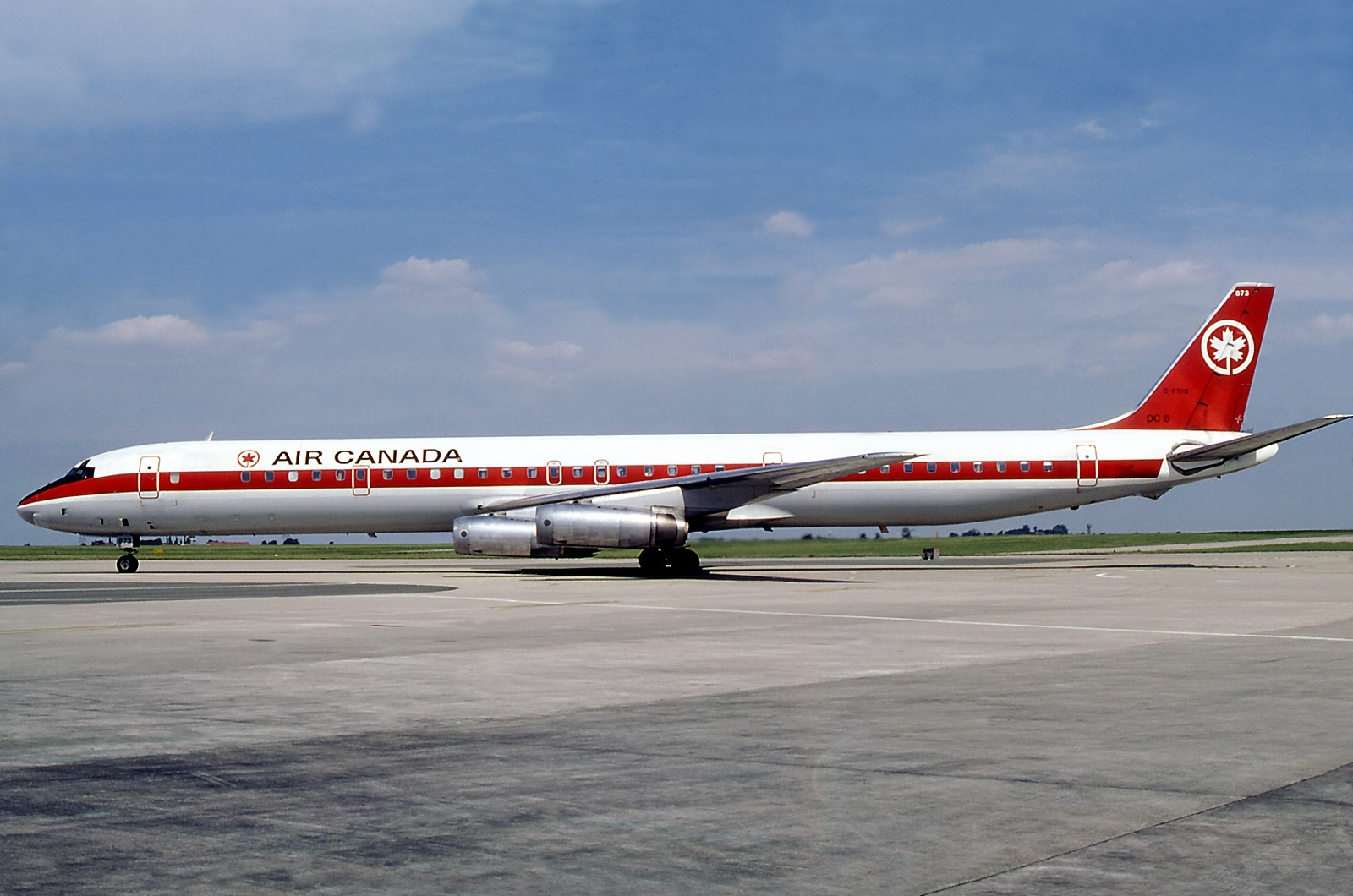
- An Air Canada DC-8, similar to the aircraft involved in the accident

Accident
- Date: July 5, 1970
- Summary: Fuel tank rupture due to hard landing, explosion after go-around
- Site: Near Toronto International Airport, Brampton, Ontario; 43.7798°N 79.6912°W

Aircraft
- Aircraft type: Douglas DC-8-63
- Operator: Air Canada
- IATA flight No.: AC621
- ICAO flight No.: ACA621
- Call sign: AIR CANADA 621
- Registration: CF-TIW
- Flight origin: Montréal–Dorval International Airport
- Stopover: Toronto International Airport
- Destination: Los Angeles International Airport
- Occupants: 109
- Passengers: 100
- Crew: 9
- Fatalities: 109
- Survivors: 0

On July 5, 1970, Air Canada Flight 621, a Douglas DC-8 registered as CF-TIW, was flying from Montréal–Dorval International Airport, Quebec, Canada, to Los Angeles International Airport, California, United States, via Toronto International Airport, Ontario, Canada. During landing at Toronto, the aircraft touched down hard, which ruptured the right fuel tanks. After a go-around, the right wing's fuel tanks exploded thrice and the aircraft crashed in Toronto Gore Township, now part of Brampton.

All 100 passengers and all 9 crew on board were killed. At the time, it was Canada's second deadliest aviation accident after Trans-Canada Air Lines Flight 831, also involving a Douglas DC-8.

It is the deadliest aviation disaster in Air Canada's history since its renaming from Trans-Canada Air Lines in 1965.

== Background ==
=== Aircraft ===
The aircraft involved, registered as CF-TIW, was a McDonnell Douglas DC-8-63, powered by four Pratt & Whitney JT3D engines. At the time of the incident, the aircraft had accumulated only 453 hours of flight time. The 60 series was a stretched version of the DC-8 that was 36.7 feet (11.2 m) longer than the DC-8 series models 10 through 50.

=== Crew ===
The captain was 50-year-old Peter Cameron Hamilton, who had logged 20,990 hours of flying time, 2,899 hours of which were logged on the DC-8. The first officer was 40-year-old Donald Rowland, who had logged 9,323 hours of flying time, 5,626 of which were logged on the DC-8. The flight engineer was 28-year-old Harry Gordon Hill, (Note: Referred to in the accident report as "the second officer") who had logged 1,284 hours of flying time, 1,045 of which were logged on the DC-8.

== Accident ==
Captain Peter Cameron Hamilton and First Officer Donald Rowland had flown on various flights together before, and had an ongoing discussion on when to arm the ground spoilers. They agreed that they did not like arming the spoilers at the beginning of the final approach, as specified in the checklist, fearing it could lead to an inadvertent spoiler deployment. The captain preferred not arming them at all, but directly deploying them once on the ground, while the co-pilot preferred arming them during the landing flare. Neither procedure was approved, as the spoilers should have been armed in the pre-landing check. The flight engineer, Harry Gordon Hill, correctly called for the spoiler deployment as evidenced in the CVR transcript.

When executed just above the runway, the landing flare procedure arrests the aircraft's descent just prior to touchdown. By raising the aircraft's nose (pitching up), lift momentarily increases, reducing the descent rate, and the main wheels may then gently contact the runway. During the flare, pilots normally retard the throttles to idle to reduce engine thrust. A squat switch within the main landing gear then signals the touchdown and automatically deploys the spoilers, if armed. This destroys any remaining lift and helps the aircraft slow down.

The pilots made an agreement that, when the captain was piloting the aircraft, the first officer would deploy the spoilers on the ground as the captain preferred, and when the first officer was piloting the aircraft, the captain would arm them on the flare as the co-pilot preferred.

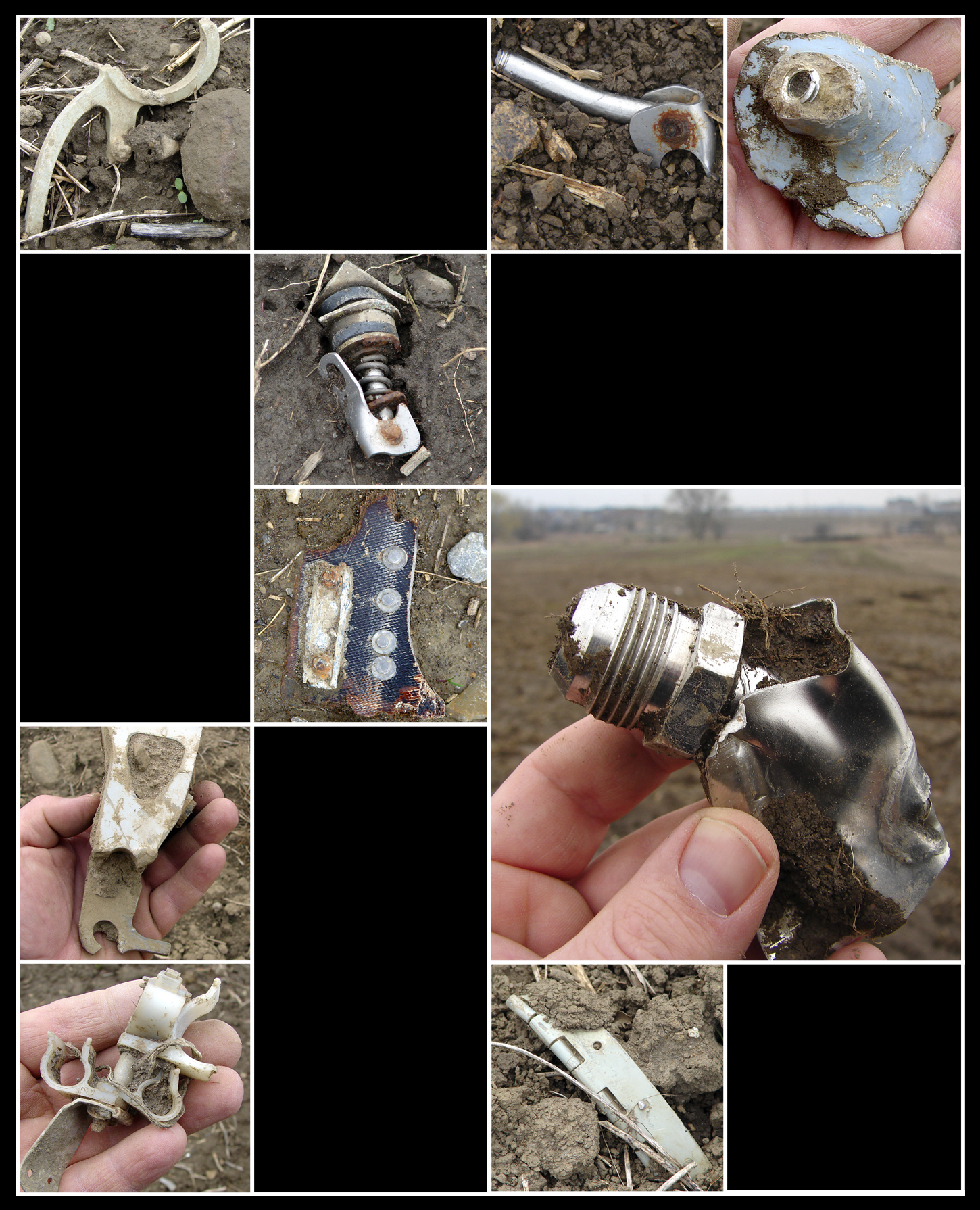
Pieces of the wreckage

In this particular instance, the captain was piloting the landing and said, "All right. Give them to me on the flare. I have given up." This was not the pilots' usual routine. Sixty feet (18 m) from the runway, the captain began to reduce power in preparation for the flare and said "Okay" to the first officer. The first officer immediately deployed the spoilers on the flare instead of just arming them. The aircraft began to sink heavily and the captain, realizing what had happened, pulled back on the control column and applied full thrust to all four engines. The nose lifted, but the aircraft still continued to sink, hitting the runway with enough force that the number four engine and pylon broke off the wing, and the tail struck the ground. Realizing what he had done, the first officer began apologizing to the captain. Apparently unaware of the severity of the damage inflicted on the aircraft, the crew managed to lift off for a go-around, but the lost fourth engine had torn off a piece of the lower wing plating and the aircraft was now trailing fuel, which ignited. The first officer requested a second landing attempt on the same runway but was told it was closed (because of the debris the DC-8 had already shed) and was directed to another runway.

Two and a half minutes after the initial collision, the outboard section of the right wing above engine number four exploded, causing parts of the wing to break off. Six seconds after this explosion, another explosion occurred in the area of the number three engine, causing the combined pylon and engine to break off and fall to the ground in flames. Six and a half seconds after the second explosion, a third explosion occurred, destroying most of the right wing, out to the wing tip. The aircraft then went into a violent nose dive, striking the ground at a high velocity of about 220 knots (410 km/h; 250 mph) and killing all 100 passengers and the nine crew members on board.

Wreckage, body parts, bits of clothing and personal effects were strewn for more than 90 metres (300 ft; 98 yd) beyond the impact spot. The plane dug a furrow 2.4 to 3.0 metres (8 to 10 ft) deep, about 50 metres (160 ft; 55 yd) from the home of the Burgsma family, in which 11 persons slept, with the crash explosion blowing out their windows.

The crash occurred in a farm field located near what is now Castlemore Road and McVean Drive in Brampton, Ontario. Memorial and witness accounts at the time reported the crash was in Woodbridge. This was because in 1970, prior to urban sprawl and changes in municipal boundaries, the site was closer to Woodbridge than Brampton.

This was the first accident involving fatalities under the Air Canada name and the first hull loss of a DC-8 series 63. In November 1963, a DC-8 of Trans-Canada Air Lines—the former name of Air Canada—Flight 831, also bound from Montreal to Toronto, crashed with a loss of 118 lives.

== Investigation ==
A board of inquiry was established to investigate the crash. The board published its official report on January 29, 1971, in which the accident was attributed to pilot error. Eight recommendations were provided, including that the activating lever for the spoilers should be designed in such a way that it could not be activated while the DC-8 is in flight, that the manufacturer should reinforce the structural integrity of the DC-8's wings and fuel tank and that Air Canada training and operating manuals should clarify the operating procedures regarding spoiler arming and deployment.

== Aftermath ==
Recovery and identification of bodies proceeded slowly after the crash because of the need to excavate the crash crater to a significant depth. More than 20 of the passengers were United States citizens, all of them listed as being from Southern California.

On July 30, 1970, 52 victims, 49 of whom were identified, were buried at Mount Pleasant Cemetery, and in May 1971 an obelisk and stone monument were erected (Plot 24-1) at the site, with all 109 victims' names inscribed. In 1979, Air Canada added an additional memorial at the cemetery.

In June 2002, Castlemore resident Paul Cardin, who had been inspired by a November 2001 Toronto Sun article revisiting the Flight 621 crash scene, discovered aircraft wreckage and possible human bone shards at the site. The Peel Regional Police investigated the findings, and it was later determined that the bones were not of recent origin, and had indeed come from the crash. Continuing searches of the crash site by archaeologist Dana Poulton and Friends of Flight 621 (a Brampton-based advocacy group founded by Cardin) produced hundreds of additional human bone fragments.

== Memorial garden dedication in 2013 ==
Since the crash, the surrounding area of the crash site itself has experienced significant residential urbanization. In January 2007, the landowners, in conjunction with the property developers, filed an application to designate a section of the crash site as a cemetery and memorial garden. On July 7, 2013, the memorial was officially opened at the site near Degrey Drive and Decorso Drive in present-day Brampton. The small memorial park, approximately 3,000 m^{2} [32,000 sq ft], contains lilacs and 109 markers of polished white granite arranged in a random configuration within a bed of black granite paving stones. A polished black granite plaque listing all the victims' names is mounted on a large pink granite boulder. Diarmuid Horgan, coordinator of the memorial site, said that he hoped the dedication ceremony would help victims' families find closure.

== In popular culture ==
The events of the crash featured in an episode of the History channel documentary Disasters of the Century, titled "Out of the Blue".
