= Hélène Brodeur =

Canadian writer (1923–2010)

Hélène Brodeur (July 13, 1923 – August 15, 2010) was a Franco-Ontarian educator, journalist and writer.

The daughter of Joseph Brodeur and Marie-Ange Turcotte, she was born in Saint-Léon-de-Val-Racine in Quebec's Eastern Townships and grew up in Val Gagné near Timmins, Ontario. She received her teaching certificate from the University of Ottawa and taught in a one-room school until 1946, when she returned to university to complete a BA. Brodeur settled in Ottawa, where she taught high school, worked as a freelance journalist for various newspapers and magazines and was an information officer for the federal Treasury Board.

In 1947, she married Robert Nantais.

She was known for the trilogies Les chroniques du Nouvel-Ontario and The Saga of Northern Ontario, as well as a number of historical novels. Her work is studied in high schools, colleges and universities in Ontario.

In 1982, she received the Prix Champlain from the Conseil de la vie française en Amérique for La Quête d'Alexandre. In 1984, she received the Prix du Nouvel-Ontario for Entre l'aube et le jour.

Brodeur died at Montfort Hospital in Ottawa at the age of 87.
