= Bompas Township, Ontario =

Coordinates: 48°08′49″N 80°20′17″W

Bompas Township is a geographic township in the Unorganized West Part of Timiskaming District in northeastern Ontario, Canada. The township is uninhabited, and has no communities. However, there is a small camp in the southwestern corner.

The township is bordered on the north by Lee Township, on the east by Grenfell Township, on the south by Burt Township and on the west by Dunmore Township.

Bompas Township is home to Ellis Lake, Little Sarsfield Lake, Bompas Lake and parts of Gould Lake and Rib Lake. Sarsfield Creek, Burt Creek and the Blanche River flow through the township. Part of the Dunmore Township Balsam Fir Outwash Deposit Conservation Reserve is located in the township.

== See also ==
- List of townships in Ontario
