= Lillord Creek =

- Location of the mouth of Lillord Creek in Ontario

Location
- Country: Canada
- Province: Ontario
- Region: Northeastern Ontario
- District: Timiskaming
- Geographic townships: Maisonville; Lee

Physical characteristics
- Source: Lillord Lake
  - location: Lee Township
  - coordinates: 48°12′24″N 80°18′07″W
  - elevation: 324 m (1,063 ft)
- Mouth: Blanche River
  - location: Maisonville Township
  - coordinates: 48°11′34″N 80°16′20″W
  - elevation: 307 m (1,007 ft)

Basin features
- River system: Saint Lawrence River drainage basin

Lillord Creek is a creek in the Unorganized West Part of Timiskaming District in northeastern Ontario, Canada. It is in the Saint Lawrence River drainage basin and is a right tributary of the Blanche River.

== Course ==
The creek rises at Lillord Lake in geographic Lee Township, It flows southeast to Berube Lake then through two unnamed lakes. The creek continues southeast, passes into geographic Maisonville Township and reaches its mouth at the Blanche River, 630 metres (2,070 ft) west of Ontario Highway 11. The Blanche River flows via Lake Timiskaming and the Ottawa River to the Saint Lawrence River.

The creek travels through no communities; the nearest is Sesekinika, 3 kilometres (1.9 mi) northeast of the mouth of the creek.
