= Val Gagné, Ontario =

Val Gagné
- Unincorporated rural community
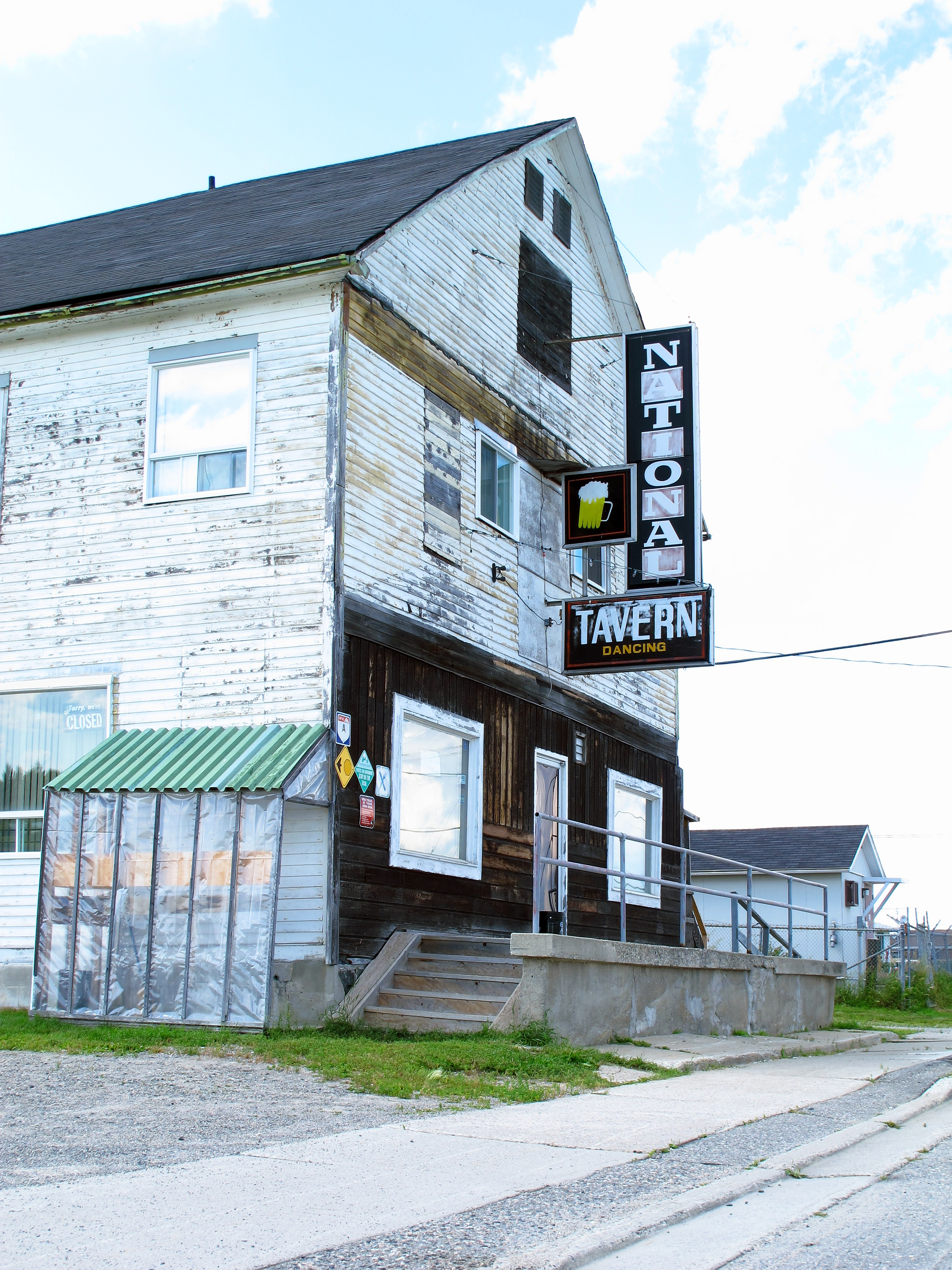
- The abandoned National Tavern in Val Gagné

- Location within Ontario
- Coordinates: 48°37′1″N 80°38′20″W
- Country: Canada
- Province: Ontario
- District: Cochrane
- Township: Black River-Matheson
- Time zone: UTC−5 (EST)
  - Summer (DST): UTC−4 (EDT)
- GNBC Code: FCZKZ

Val Gagné is an unincorporated rural community in the township of Black River-Matheson, Cochrane District, Ontario, Canada. It is located 1.5 km (0.93 mi) east of Highway 11, between Matheson and Iroquois Falls. For many years the community was accessible by train. The Ontario Northland Railway's Northlander from Toronto to Cochrane, which passed through Val Gagné, made its final passenger run in 2012. An Ontario Northland bus now stops at Val Gagné.

Previously called "Nushka", the settlement was completely destroyed in the Great Fire of 1916, which burned more than 3,100 km^{2} (1,200 sq mi) of forest. The town was rebuilt and renamed "Val Gagné", for Wilfrid "Little Father" Gagné, a Catholic priest who died trying to rescue his parishioners from the fire.

== History ==
The Temiskaming and Northern Ontario Railway constructed a line through the area between 1906 and 1909. Shortly after, a Catholic clergyman named Bourassa began settling families from the nearby province of Quebec, at two locations along line, Ramore and Nushka (now Val Gagné). Under the auspices of the church, the settlers established farms around Nushka.

In 1911, the Church of the Immaculate Conception was founded in Nushka, along with a school. A post office, "Nushka Station", opened that same year. The early settlement had a creamery, a store, about 20 frame houses, and a temporary railway station made of a boxcar fitted with a platform.

The influence of the church made Nushka "something of a spiritual centre...more of an extension of northern Quebec than of Ontario".

=== The Great Fire of 1916 ===
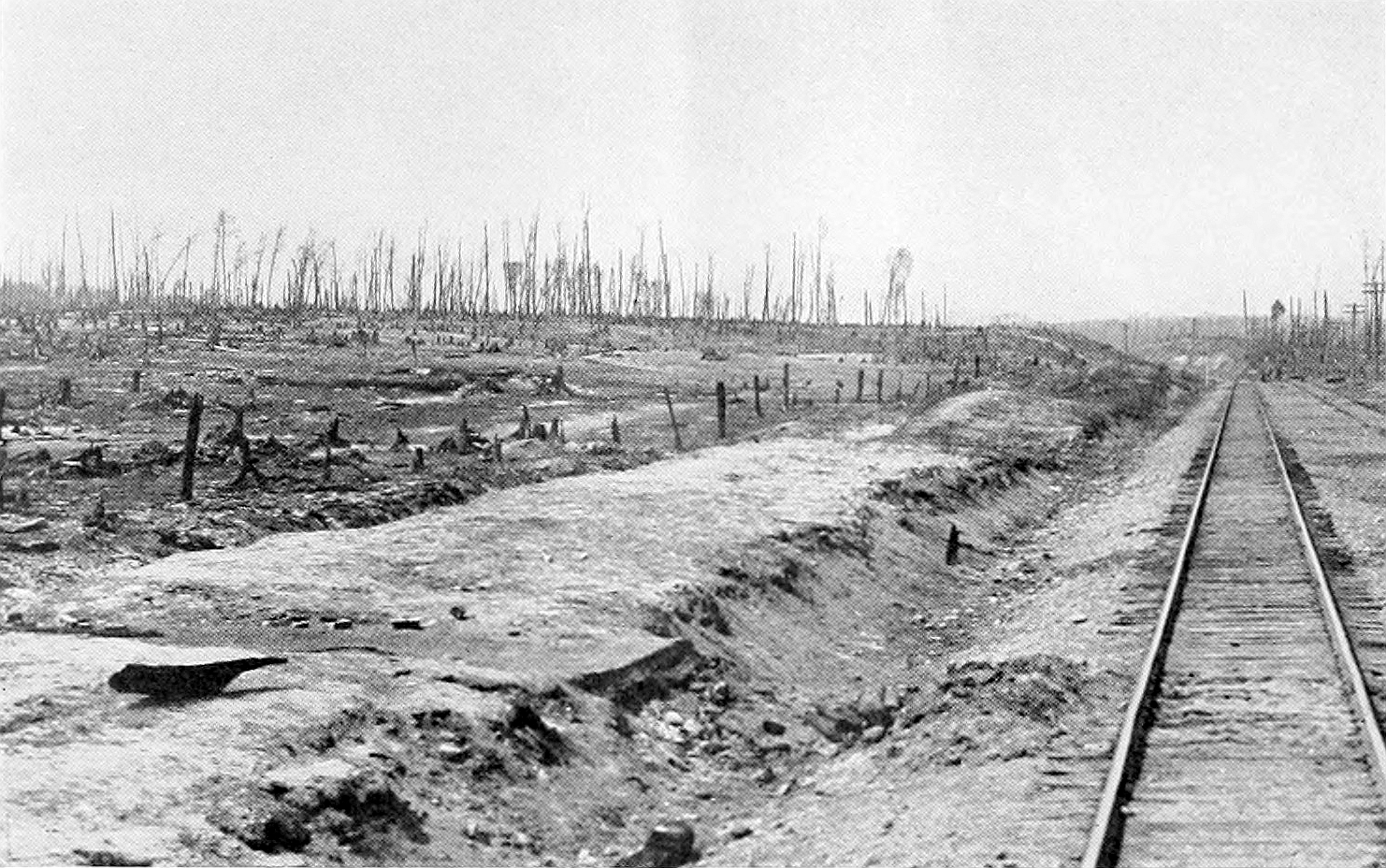
The railway in Nushka shortly after the fire, where at least 35 bodies were found

On July 29, 1916—at around the same time a large forest fire was reaching Nushka—the settlement's priest, Wilfred Gagné, was arriving in Nushka by train following a clerical retreat. Gagné had been priest in Nushka for just a month, and lived above Nushka's store. As heavy smoke filled the air, the train's conductor advised Gagné not to leave the safety of the train. Gagné instead entered Nushka and led 35 people to the railway line. He then returned to the burning town to save 28 others. Within a few hours both groups had burned to death or been suffocated, the lone survivor a man who used moist clay to filter the smoke. Nushka was completely destroyed. Of the town's inhabitants, only eight were left after the fire.

When Nushka rebuilt, it was renamed in Gagné's honour, and a monument dedicated to Gagné was erected in the Val Gagné Cemetery.

=== Later history ===
The Val Gagné post office closed in 1980.

The Church of the Immaculate Conception continues to function in Val Gagné. Val Gagné has an outdoor skating rink, a ball park, a community hall, a senior's housing facility, a fire department, and a Caisse Populaire credit union. The township of Black River-Matheson operates a bi-monthly transportation service to take Val Gagné residents shopping in Timmins.

== Notable people ==
- Hélène Brodeur, educator, journalist and writer
