= Matheson Fire =

Deadly 1916 forest fire

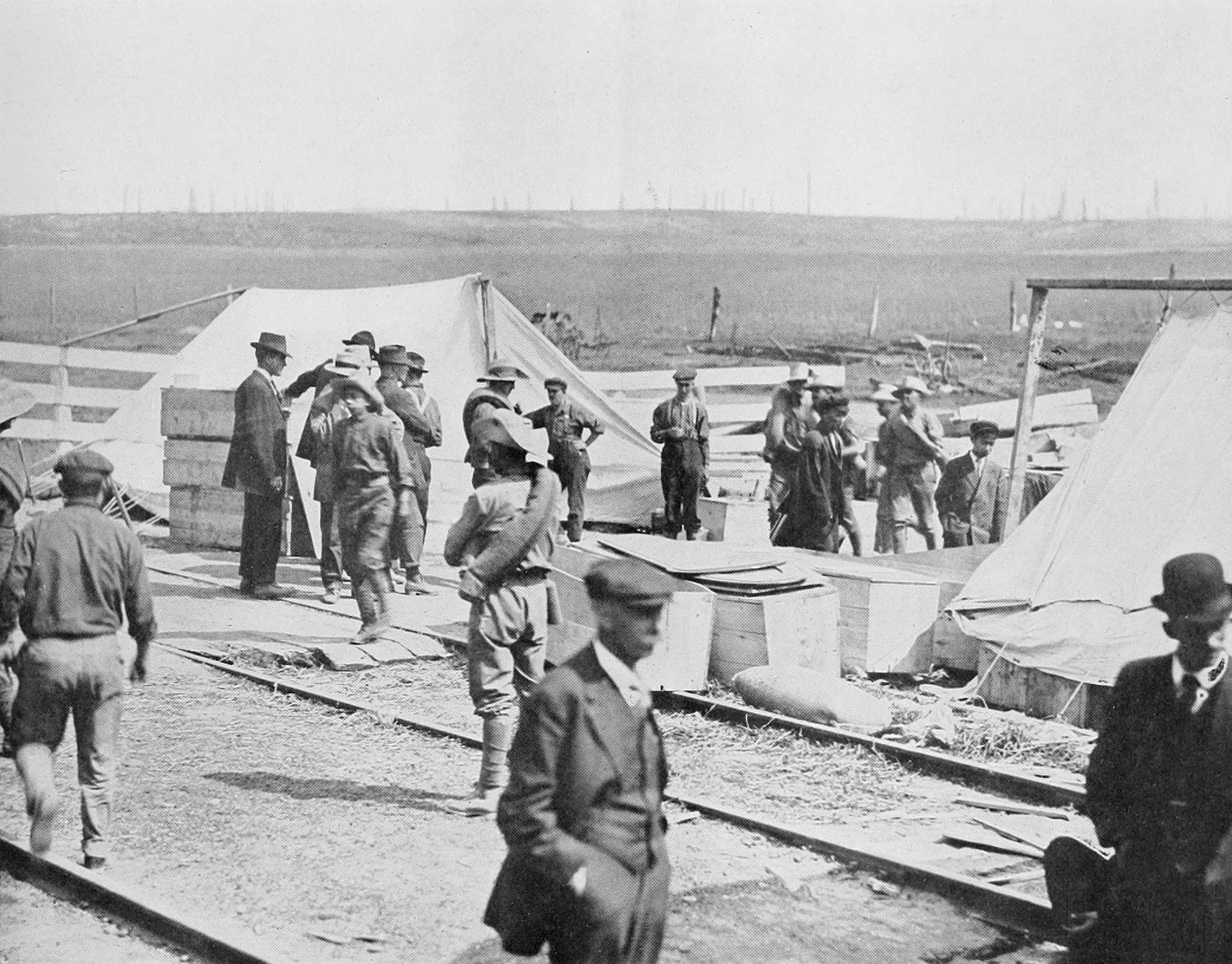
- Temporary morgue at Matheson
- Date: July 29, 1916
- Location: Ontario, Canada
- Coordinates: 48°32′N 80°28′W

Statistics
- Total area: 490,000 acres (2,000 km^{2})

Impacts
- Deaths: ~223

Map
- Location within Ontario

The great Matheson Fire was a deadly forest fire that passed through the region surrounding the communities of Black River-Matheson and Iroquois Falls, Ontario, Canada, on July 29, 1916.

As was common practice at the time, settlers cleared land using the slash-and-burn method. That summer, there was little rain, and the forests and underbrush burned easily. In the days leading up to July 29, several smaller fires that had been purposely set merged into a single large firestorm. It was huge; at times its front measured 64 kilometres (40 mi) across. The fire moved uncontrollably upon the towns of Porquis Junction, Iroquois Falls, Kelso, Nushka, Matheson, and Ramore, destroying them completely and causing extensive damage to Homer and Monteith. A separate fire burned in and around Cochrane. In all, the fires burned an area of approximately 2,000 square kilometres (490,000 acres).

Because of forest fire smoke that had covered the region for several weeks and the absence of a forest fire monitoring service, there was almost no warning that the conflagration was upon the communities. Some people escaped on the Temiskaming and Northern Ontario Railway (now the Ontario Northland Railway), while others were saved by wading into the nearby Black River or one of the small lakes in the area. 223 people were killed according to the official estimate.

After the fire, the village of Nushka was completely removed from maps of the region. The village was rebuilt and renamed to Val Gagné, named after local priest Wilfrid Gagne, who died rescuing churchgoers from the fire.

The Matheson Fire led to the creation of the Forest Protection Branch of the Department of Lands, Forests, and Mines (now known as the Ministry of Natural Resources and Forestry) and the Forest Fires Prevention Act in Ontario.

The great fires are the subject of the books Killer in the Bush by Michael Barnes, and Il pleuvait des oiseaux by Jocelyne Saucier.

== Historical plaque ==
An Ontario Heritage Foundation historical plaque stands in Alarie Park near Matheson and reads:

THE GREAT FIRE OF 1916
On July 29, 1916, fires that had been burning for some weeks around settlers’ clearings along the Temiskaming & Northern Ontario Railway were united by strong winds into one huge conflagration. Burning easterly along a 40-mile (64 km) front, it largely or completely destroyed the settlements of Porquis Junction, Iroquois Falls, Kelso, Nushka, Matheson and Ramore. It also partially razed the hamlets of Homer and Monteith, while a smaller fire caused widespread damage in and around Cochrane. The 500,000-acre (2,000 km^{2}) holocaust took an estimated 223 lives, more than any other forest fire in Canadian history, and led to the development of improved techniques and legislation for the prevention and control of forest fires.

== See also ==
- List of fires in Canada
