= Cariad Cywir =

Welsh folk song

Cariad Cywir, or Troi'r wythnos yn flwyddyn, is a Welsh folk song that focuses on somebody experiencing unrequited love, as s/he sings, "Trio'r wythnos yn flwyddyn, troi'r flwyddyn yn dair Rwy'n ffaelu troi 'nghariad i siarad un gair (Turn the week to a year, turn the year into three I can't turn my true love to speak to me)". But s/he swears that "as long as the sea is salty still", s/he will still love him/her.
