= Easter Lake Park =

Park in Des Moines, Iowa

- Interactive map of Easter Lake Park
- Type: Urban park
- Location: Des Moines, Iowa
- Coordinates: 41°32′25.7928″N 93°33′32.832″W
- Area: 468 acres (189 ha)
- Established: 1967
- Owner: Polk County Conservation
- Website: Easter Lake Park & Mark C. Ackelson Trail - Polk County Iowa

Easter Lake is a 468 acres (189 ha) reservoir located in southeast Des Moines, Iowa, completed in 1967 for recreation. The park has a 178 acres (72 ha) lake and a 4 miles (6.4 km) trail around it. It has a 6,500 acres (2,600 ha) watershed and is owned and operated by Polk County Conservation.

== History ==
Before Easter Lake was created, it was a strip mine used to mine coal, which closed in 1959. In 1959 the strip coal mine was closed. In 1967, Easter Lake was officially opened.

In 2000, Easter Lake was visited by about 400,000 people, making it one of the busiest parks in Polk County. The lake was included on a registry of seriously polluted Iowan waterways in 2008. On August 27, 2025, the Polk County Conservation found that the levels of E. coli in the lake made it unsafe to swim in.
