= Convent Crash =

Crash of Royal Canadian Air Force jet

Coordinates: 45°29′00″N 75°32′45″W

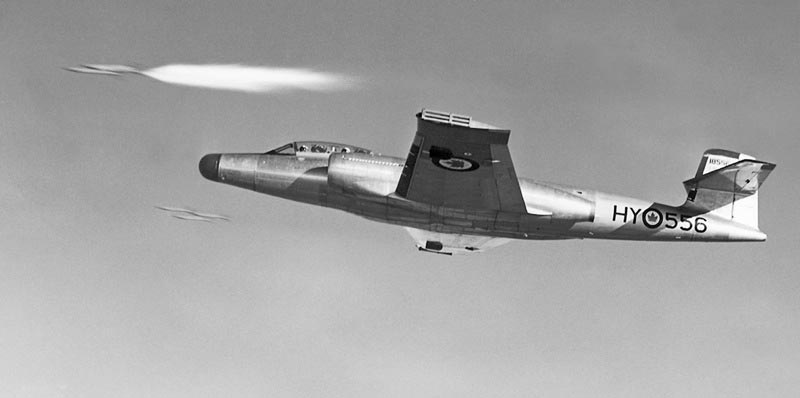
- An Avro Canada CF-100 Canuck

Accident
- Date: May 15, 1956
- Summary: Aircraft crashed into building, cause undetermined
- Site: Canada
- Total fatalities: 15

Aircraft
- Aircraft type: Avro Canada CF-100 Canuck
- Aircraft name: Clunk
- Operator: Royal Canadian Air Force
- Flight origin: RCAF Station Uplands
- Destination: RCAF Station Uplands
- Occupants: 2
- Crew: 2
- Fatalities: 2 (Pilots)
- Injuries: 0
- Survivors: 0

Ground casualties
- Ground fatalities: 13
- Ground injuries: Unknown

The Convent Crash, also known as the Orléans air disaster and Villa St. Louis disaster, occurred on May 15, 1956, after a CF-100 fighter jet crashed into Villa St. Louis, a convent in the community of Orleans, Ontario, Canada, a suburb of Ottawa. The two pilots were killed in the crash, along with 13 people in the building: 11 members of the Grey Nuns, a civilian servant, and the chaplain, a retired naval padre.

== Events ==
At 10:37 p.m. May 15, 1956, two CF-100s took off from their base at RCAF Station Uplands (located south of Ottawa) on an exercise to practice interception techniques in identifying an unknown aircraft heading towards Montreal. The plane was identified as a RCAF North Star flying from Resolute Bay to Dorval Airport. The two planes climbed to 33,000 feet (10,000 m) and burn off excess fuel before returning to base.

One of the aircraft returned to base, but the other remained airborne longer to burn off more excess fuel. The plane descended at a speed of nearly 680 miles per hour (1,090 km/h) and crashed into the Villa St. Louis. The cause has never been officially determined, but it is thought that an oxygen failure caused the crew to pass out.

== Impact ==
At the time the plane crashed many of the occupants of the building were asleep. The three-storey, seventy-room building was run by the Grey Nuns. The two crewmen of the plane were killed instantly upon impact with the building. Then the fuel of the plane ignited and a fire ensued. Some of the occupants of the building jumped from windows. Others remained trapped in the building frantically trying to open windows. Victims unable to escape their rooms died of smoke inhalation. The fire was extinguished in the early hours of the next day.

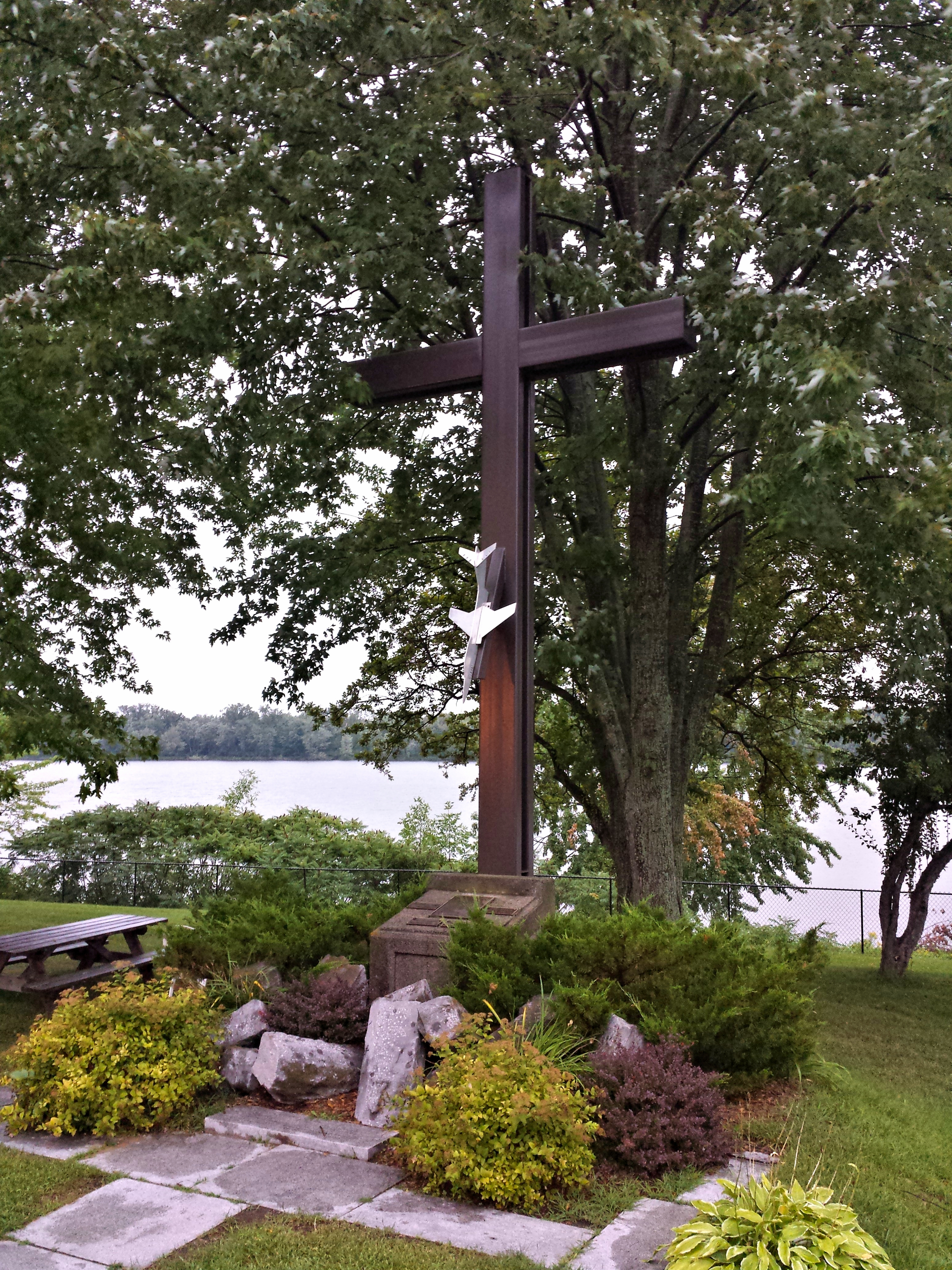
Convent Crash memorial

== Legacy ==
A memorial 20-foot (6.1 m) cross adorned with a model CF-101 Voodoo fighter aircraft, surrounded by 15 stones taken from the rubble of Villa St-Louis is dedicated to the memory of the fifteen victims of the Orléans Aviation Disaster. The memorial was erected behind Villa St-Louis on May 13, 2009, by a group of Orléans veterans and members of the Sisters of Charity of Ottawa.

A ceremony marked the 50th anniversary of Villa St-Louis disaster at the Residence Saint-Louis long term care facility which was built on the same site as the old Villa St-Louis. The ceremony was organized by three former members of the RCAF in co-operation with the Sisters of Charity who run the Residence Saint-Louis and the Orléans Legion.
