= Sarsfield Creek =

- Location of the mouth of Sarsfield Creek in Ontario

Location
- Country: Canada
- Province: Ontario
- Region: Northeastern Ontario
- District: Timiskaming

Physical characteristics
- Source: Little Sarsfield Lake
  - location: Bompas Township
  - coordinates: 48°09′59″N 80°20′41″W
  - elevation: 351 m (1,152 ft)
- Mouth: Meyers Lake on Woollings Creek
  - location: Lee Township
  - coordinates: 48°16′15″N 80°18′10″W
  - elevation: 313 m (1,027 ft)

Basin features
- River system: James Bay drainage basin
- Tributaries
  - left: Tomwool Creek

Sarsfield Creek is a creek in Timiskaming District in northeastern Ontario, Canada. It is in the James Bay drainage basin and is a right tributary of Woollings Creek.

== Course ==
The creek rises at Little Sarsfield Lake in geographic Bompas Township. It then flows north into Ellis Lake, then into Gould Lake, which straddles the border with geographic Lee Township, then into Sarsfield Lake. It takes in the left tributary Tomwool Creek, turns northeast, and reaches its mouth at Meyers Lake, on Woollings Creek, near the border with Cochrane District. Woollings Creek flows via the Whiteclay River, the Black River, the Abitibi River and the Moose River to James Bay.

The creek travels through no communities; the nearest is Sesekinika, 10 kilometres (6.2 mi) east of the source of the creek.
