= Woollings Creek =

- Location of the mouth of Woollings Creek in Ontario

Location
- Country: Canada
- Province: Ontario
- Region: Northeastern Ontario
- Districts: Timiskaming; Cochrane

Physical characteristics
- Source: Big Finlander Lake
  - location: Black River-Matheson, Cochrane District
  - coordinates: 48°18′05″N 80°21′51″W
  - elevation: 353 m (1,158 ft)
- Mouth: Swan Lake
  - location: Maisonville Township, Timiskaming District
  - coordinates: 48°14′36″N 80°16′06″W
  - elevation: 312 m (1,024 ft)

Basin features
- River system: James Bay drainage basin
- Tributaries
  - left: Benoit Creek
  - right: Sarsfield Creek

Woollings Creek is a creek in Timiskaming District and Cochrane District in northeastern Ontario, Canada. It is in the James Bay drainage basin and is a tributary of the Whiteclay River.

== Course ==
The creek begins at Big Finlander Lake in geographic Black Township in the municipality of Black River-Matheson, Cochrane District and heads southeast, then turns curves northeast and then southeast around Gipsy Mountain to reach Meyers Lake. There it enters geographic Lee Township in the Unorganized West Part of Timiskaming District and takes in the right tributary Sarsfield Creek and left tributary Benoit Creek. The creek continues southeast into geographic Maisonville Township and reaches its mouth at Swan Lake, the source of the Whiteclay River. The Whiteclay River flows via the Black River, the Abitibi River and the Moose River to James Bay.

The creek travels through no communities; the nearest is Sesekinika, 5.8 kilometres (3.6 mi) southeast of the mouth of the creek.

== Tributaries ==
- Benoit Creek (left)
- Sarsfield Creek (right)
