= Meyers Lake (Ontario) =

Lake in Ontario, Canada

- Location in Ontario
- Location: Cochrane District and Timiskaming District, Ontario
- Coordinates: 48°16′21″N 80°17′49″W
- Part of: James Bay drainage basin
- Primary inflows: Benoit Creek, Sarsfield Creek, Woollings Creek
- Primary outflows: Woollings Creek
- Basin countries: Canada
- Max. length: 1.91 km (1.19 mi)
- Max. width: 1.77 km (1.10 mi)
- Surface elevation: 313 metres (1,027 ft)
- Islands: 3

Meyers Lake is a lake in Cochrane District and Timiskaming District, in northeastern Ontario, Canada. The lake is in the James Bay drainage basin and the nearest community is Bourkes, 4.6 kilometres (2.9 mi) to the northeast.

The northern quarter of the lake is in geographic Black Township in the municipality of Black River-Matheson, Cochrane District; the rest of the lake is in geographic Lee Township in the Unorganized West Part of Timiskaming District.

The lake is about 1.91 kilometres (1.19 mi) long and 1.77 kilometres (1.10 mi) wide. It has three small, unnamed islands. The primary inflows are Sarsfield Creek at the west; Woollings Creek at northwest; and Benoit Creek at the northeast. There is one unnamed secondary inflow at the north. The primary outflow, at the east, is also Woollings Creek, which heads southeast to its mouth at Swan Lake. The latter lake empties via the Whiteclay River, the Black River, the Abitibi River and the Moose River to James Bay.

== See also ==
- List of lakes in Ontario
