= Unorganized South East Cochrane District =

- Unorganized area
- Cochrane, Unorganized, South East Part
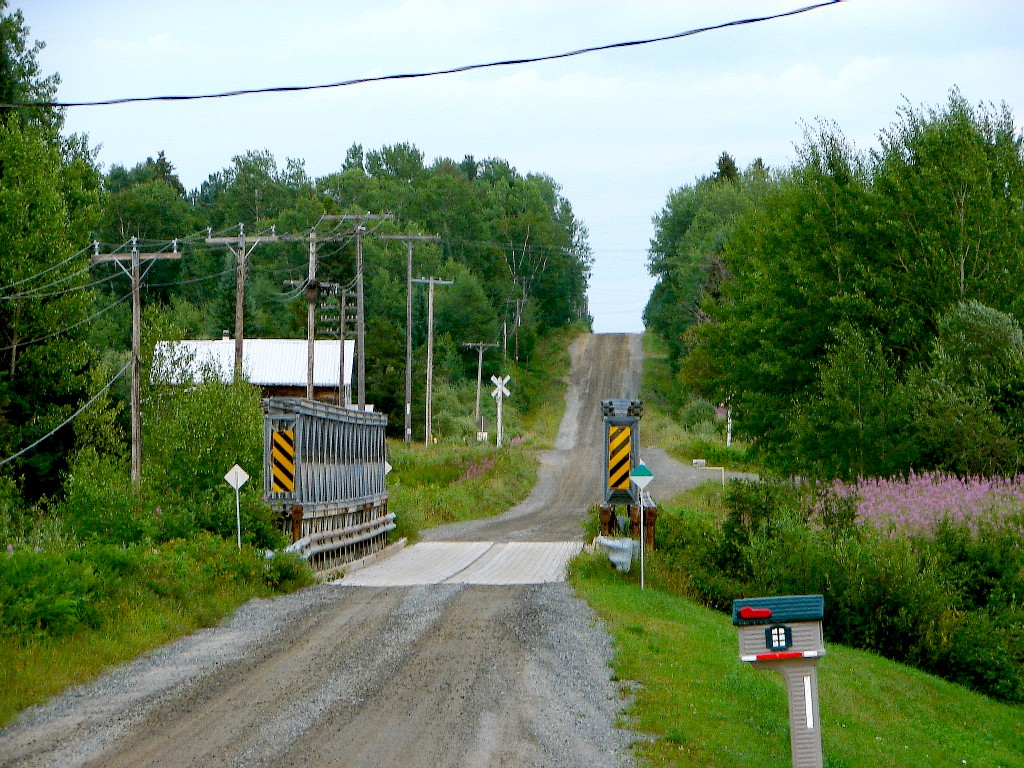
- Ontario Northland Railway crossing in Bourkes

- Location within Ontario
- Coordinates: 48°18.5′N 80°14′W
- Country: Canada
- Province: Ontario
- District: Cochrane

Government
  - Fed. riding: Kapuskasing—Timmins—Mushkegowuk
  - Prov. riding: Timiskaming—Cochrane

Area
  - Land: 53.46 km^{2} (20.64 sq mi)

Population (2021)
  - Total: 25
  - Density: 0.5/km^{2} (1.3/sq mi)
- Time zone: UTC-5 (EST)
  - Summer (DST): UTC-4 (EDT)
- Area codes: 705, 249

Unorganized South East Cochrane District is an unorganized area in the Canadian province of Ontario, encompassing the small portion of the Cochrane District, immediately surrounding Highway 11 at the division's southern boundary with the Timiskaming District, which is not part of the municipality of Black River-Matheson which surrounds it. It consists of the southern half of the geographic township of Benoit and is the southernmost limit of the Great Clay Belt of northern Ontario.

The division had a population of 25 in the 2021 Canadian census, and a land area of 53.46 square kilometres. The main settlement in the division is the ghost town of Bourkes, located at the Ontario Northland Railway crossing on Bourkes road. The area was initially settled by Scandinavian immigrants around 1911 as a dairy farming region and by 1914 had a store, railway station and siding, school, post office and bunkhouse as well as two gold mines. The population peaked in the 1930s at 300, but slowly declined after the two local gold mines were shuttered and the timber trade dried up. The post office was closed in 1969 and the last store closed in the 1970s, today, only the disused bunkhouse and a few scattered houses remain of the settlement.

== Demographics ==
Canada census – Cochrane, Unorganized, South East Part community profile

	2021	2016	2011
Population	25 (+150.0% from 2016)	10 (-33.3% from 2011)	15 (-40.0% from 2006)
Land area	53.46 km^{2} (20.64 sq mi)	53.44 km^{2} (20.63 sq mi)	53.19 km^{2} (20.54 sq mi)
Population density	0.5/km^{2} (1.3/sq mi)	0.2/km^{2} (0.52/sq mi)	0.3/km^{2} (0.78/sq mi)
Median age	N/A (M: , F: )	N/A (M: , F: )
Private dwellings	19 (total) 15 (occupied)	8 (total) 5 (occupied)	13 (total)
Median household income	$ N/A	$ N/A

References: 2021 2016 2011

Historical census populations – Unorganized South East Cochrane District

Year	Pop.	±%
1976	56	—
1981	56	+0.0%
1986	53	−5.4%
1991	38	−28.3%
1996	29	−23.7%

Year	Pop.	±%
2001	21	−27.6%
2006	25	+19.0%
2011	15	−40.0%
2016	10	−33.3%
2021	25	+150.0%

Population counts are not adjusted for boundary changes.
Source: Statistics Canada

== See also ==
- List of townships in Ontario
