= Black River-Matheson =

- Township (single-tier)
- Township of Black River-Matheson
- Aerial view of Matheson

- Location within Ontario
- Coordinates: 48°32′N 80°28′W
- Country: Canada
- Province: Ontario
- District: Cochrane
- Established: 1969

Government
  - Type: Township
  - Mayor: Dave Dyment
  - Governing Body: Black River-Matheson Township Council
  - MP: Gaétan Malette (Conservative)
  - MPP: John Vanthof (NDP)

Area
  - Land: 1,161.89 km^{2} (448.61 sq mi)

Population (2021)
  - Total: 2,572
  - Density: 2.2/km^{2} (5.7/sq mi)
- Time zone: UTC-5 (EST)
  - Summer (DST): UTC-4 (EDT)
- Postal code FSA: P0K
- Area codes: 705, 249
- Website: www.blackriver-matheson.com

Black River-Matheson is a township in the Cochrane District of the Canadian province of Ontario. The municipality is astride the Black River, for which it is partly named. The Matheson railway station was serviced by the Northlander until 2012.

Matheson was first known as McDougall's Chute after an early trapper. Renamed for Arthur J. Matheson (1842–1913), provincial Treasurer and M.P.P. for Lanark South.

Mining, forestry and farming are some of the principal industries in the area, augmented by outdoor tourism in the summer, such as fishing and hunting. There are three elementary schools within the municipality.

== Communities ==
The communities in the township are Holtyre, Matheson, Ramore, Shillington, Val Gagné, and Wavell. The main community of Matheson is located at the intersection of highways 11 and 101.

== History ==
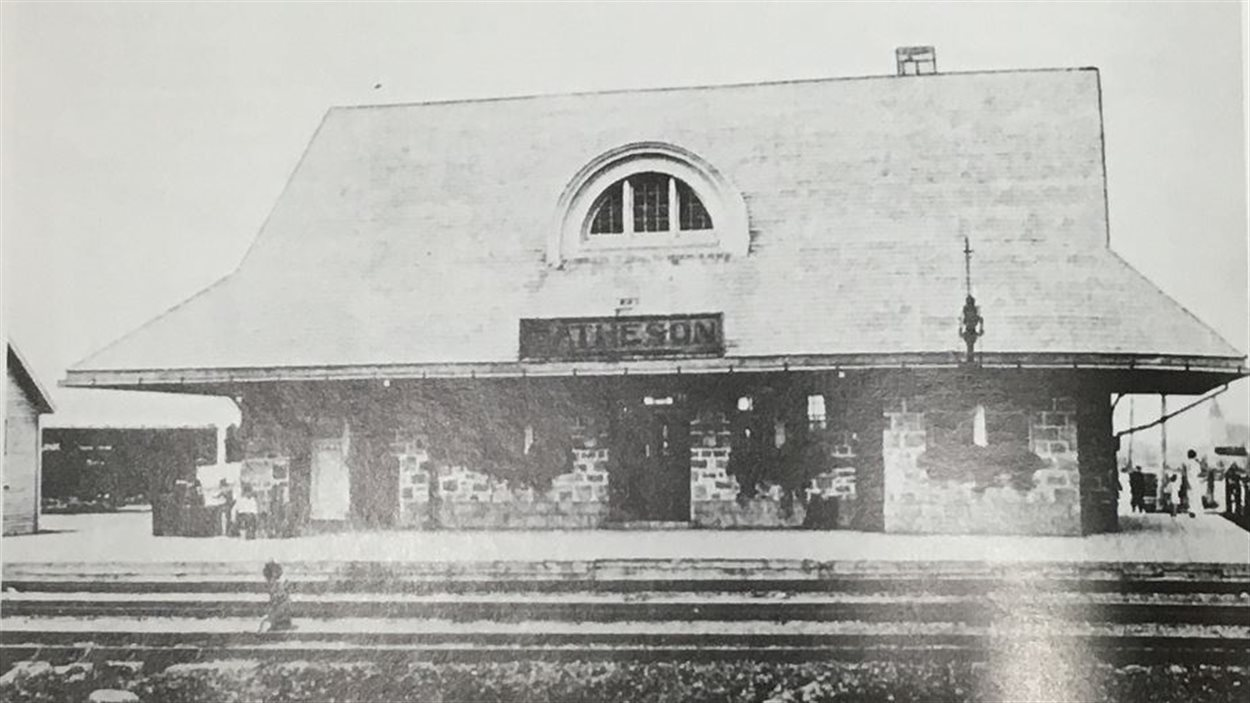
Matheson station, 1910

Settlement of Matheson began in 1907 at the same time that the Temiskaming and Northern Ontario Railway was built in the area, and was originally called McDougall Chute, named after Baziel McDougall, a local trapper. It was renamed in 1912 in honour of Colonel Arthur J. Matheson.

Prospecting started in 1909. The Croesus Mine (1914–1918) became "one of the richest mines in Canada". Gold was like "plums in pudding" and "one gold nugget was egg shaped, two inches long and one and a quarter across." A total of 16 companies operated in the Harker Holloway area from 1917 to 1925, including Harker Gold Mines. P.A. McDermott found a gold-bearing zone in 1922, which became American Barrick's Holt-McDermott Mine in 1988. Located in the Abitibi greenstone belt, the mine produced 60,000 ounces of gold in 1994.

The Great Fire of 1916 left 243 dead.

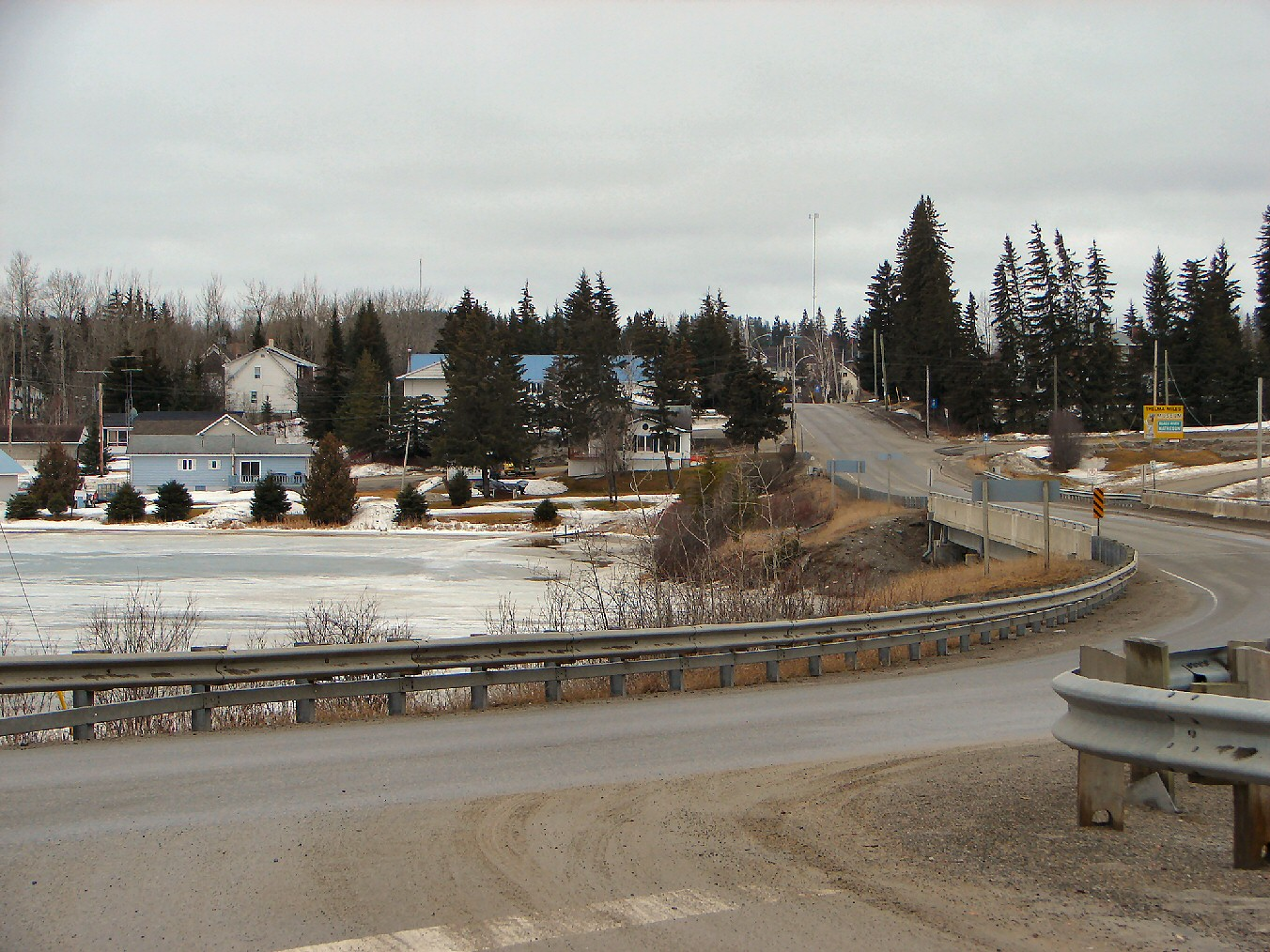
The Vernon L. Miller Memorial Bridge taking Highway 101 across the Black River into Matheson

In 1945, the Township of Black River was incorporated, consisting of the geographic townships of Stock, Taylor, Carr, Beatty, Bond, Currie, Bowman, Hislop, and part of Walker. In 1969, the Township of Black River and the Town of Matheson merged to form the Township of Black River-Matheson, and in 1973, it was enlarged through the addition of Playfair Township and Kingham Improvement District.

== Demographics ==
In the 2021 Census of Population conducted by Statistics Canada, Black River-Matheson had a population of 2,572 living in 1,078 of its 1,403 total private dwellings, a change of 5.5% from its 2016 population of 2,438. With a land area of 1,161.89 km^{2} (448.61 sq mi), it had a population density of 2.2/km^{2} (5.7/sq mi) in 2021.

Canada census – Black River-Matheson community profile

	2021	2016	2011
Population	2,572 (+5.5% from 2016)	2,438 (+1.2% from 2011)	2,410 (-8.0% from 2006)
Land area	1,161.89 km^{2} (448.61 sq mi)	1,163.45 km^{2} (449.21 sq mi)	1,163.41 km^{2} (449.20 sq mi)
Population density	2.2/km^{2} (5.7/sq mi)	2.1/km^{2} (5.4/sq mi)	2.1/km^{2} (5.4/sq mi)
Median age	46.8 (M: 46.4, F: 47.2)	48.3 (M: 48.8, F: 47.6)
Private dwellings	1,403 (total) 1,078 (occupied)	1,149 (total)	1,172 (total)
Median household income	$75,000	$64,640

References: 2021 2016 2011

Historical census populations – Black River-Matheson

Year	Pop.	±%
1971	3,182	—
1976	3,874	+21.7%
1981	3,543	−8.5%
1986	3,390	−4.3%
1991	3,451	+1.8%
1996	3,220	−6.7%

Year	Pop.	±%
2001	2,912	−9.6%
2006	2,619	−10.1%
2011	2,410	−8.0%
2016	2,438	+1.2%
2021	2,572	+5.5%

Population counts are not adjusted for boundary changes.
Source: Statistics Canada

== Notable people ==
- Harry Brightwell, Member of Parliament; born in Matheson.
- Bob McCord, professional hockey player; born in Matheson.
- Dianne Poole, Member of Provincial Parliament; raised in Matheson.

== See also ==
- Bolton Lake
- Canadian Forces Station Ramore
- Wahgoshig First Nation
- Timmins—James Bay Electoral District
- List of townships in Ontario
- List of communities in Ontario
- List of francophone communities in Ontario
- Matachewan, Ontario
- Cobalt silver rush
- Porcupine Gold Rush
- Red Lake, Ontario
- Greenstone, Ontario
