= Whiteclay River =

- Location of the mouth of the Whiteclay River in Ontario

Location
- Country: Canada
- Province: Ontario
- Region: Northeastern Ontario
- District: Timiskaming; Cochrane

Physical characteristics
- Source: Swan Lake
  - location: Maisonville Township, Timiskaming District
  - coordinates: 48°14′16″N 80°15′44″W
  - elevation: 312 m (1,024 ft)
- Mouth: Black River
  - location: Black River-Matheson, Cochrane District
  - coordinates: 48°20′44″N 80°12′43″W
  - elevation: 286 m (938 ft)

Basin features
- River system: James Bay drainage basin
- Tributaries
  - right: Wolf Creek

The Whiteclay River is a river in Cochrane District and Timiskaming District in northeastern Ontario, Canada. It is in the James Bay drainage basin and is a left tributary of the Black River.

== Course ==
The river begins at Swan Lake in geographic Maisonville Township in the Unorganized West Part of Timiskaming District. It flows east under Ontario Highway 11 and the Ontario Northland Railway (ONR) line to Upper Twin Lake. It then heads north, passes again under the ONR, takes in the right tributary Wolf Creek, and heads into geographic Benoit Township, Cochrane District. The river continues north into the municipality of Black River-Matheson, and reaches its mouth at the Black River. The Black River flows via the Abitibi River and the Moose River to James Bay.
