= Sesekinika =

- Unincorporated community
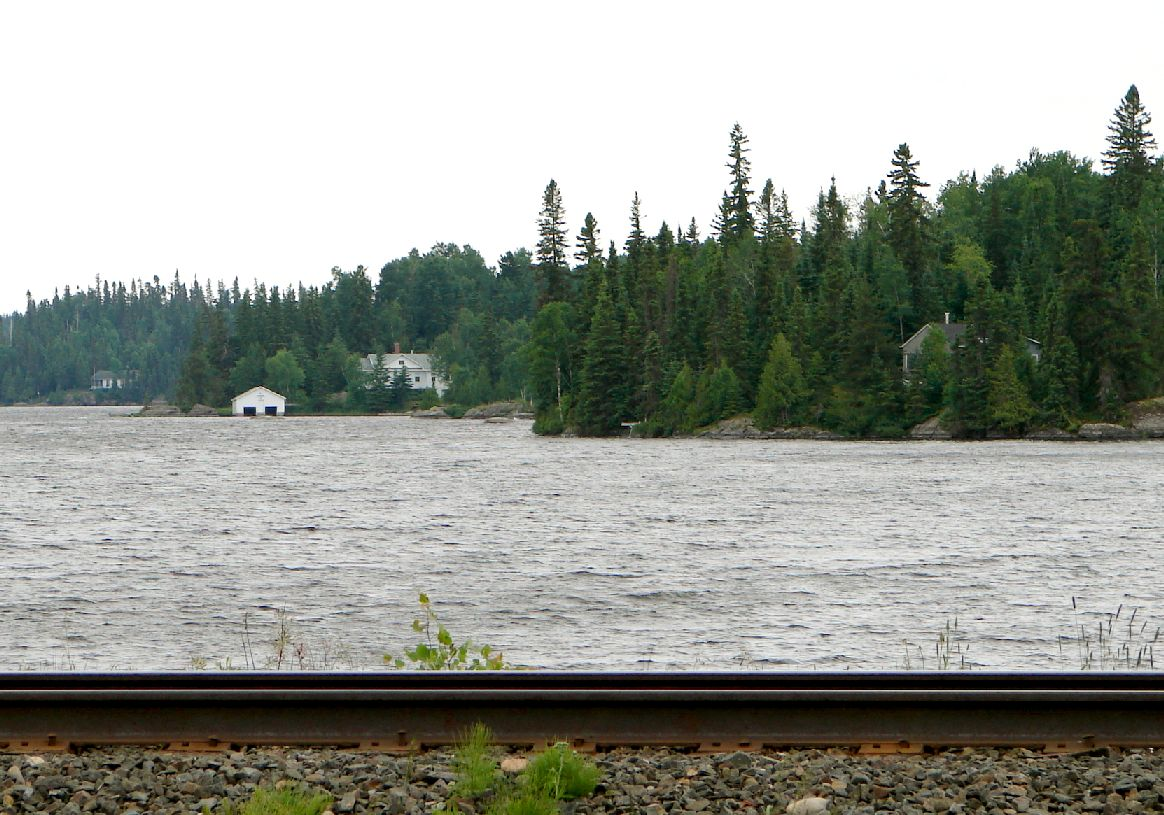
- Sesekinika Lake

- Location in Ontario
- Coordinates: 48°11′01″N 80°14′08″W
- Country: Canada
- Province: Ontario
- District: Timiskaming
- Geographic township: Maisonville
- Elevation: 306 m (1,004 ft)
- Time zone: UTC-5 (Eastern Time Zone)
  - Summer (DST): UTC-4 (Eastern Time Zone)
- Postal Code: P0K 1T0
- Area codes: 705, 249

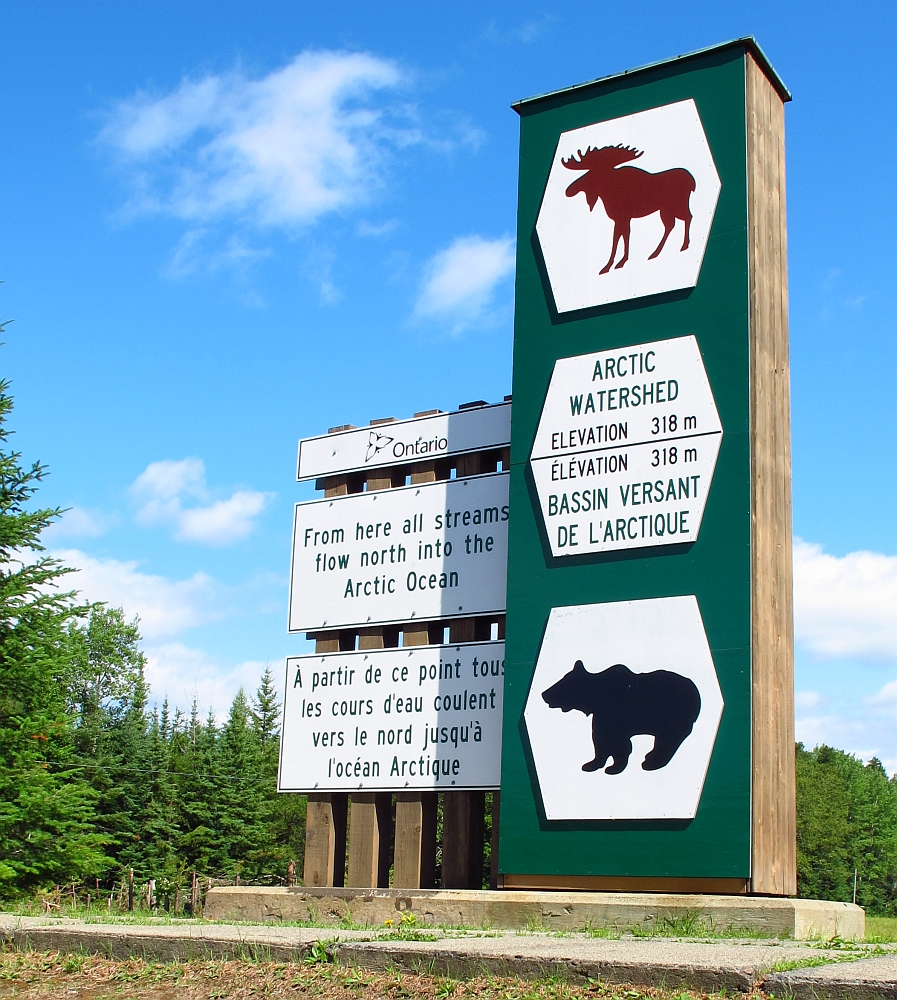
Highway 11 crosses the geographic division between the Atlantic and Arctic Watersheds at Sesekinika

Sesekinika is an unincorporated community in geographic Maisonville Township, in the Unorganized West Part of Timiskaming District in northeastern Ontario, Canada.

The community is located along the Ontario Northland Railway at the eastern terminus of Ontario Highway 570.
