= Black River (Abitibi River tributary) =

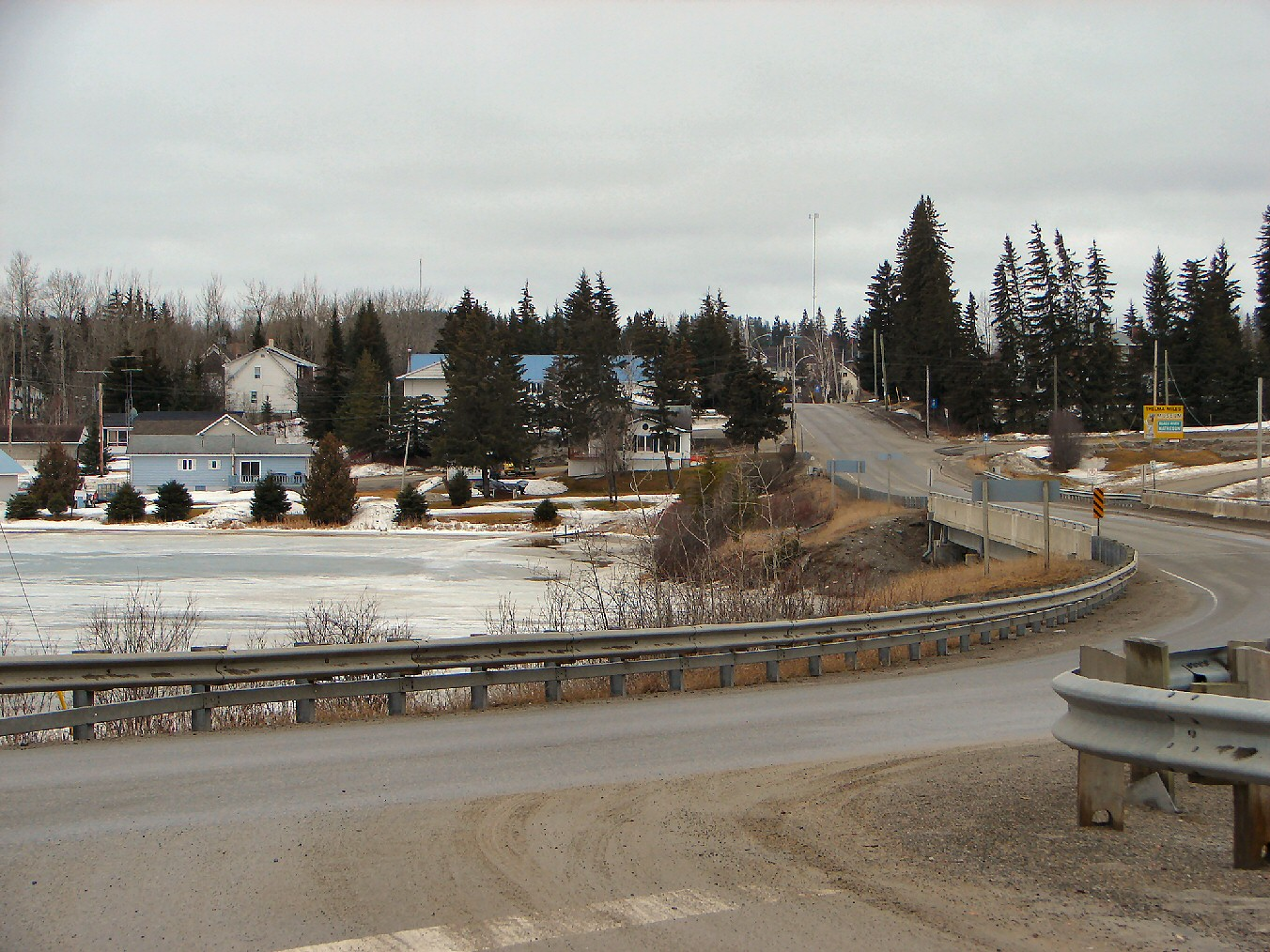
- The Vernon L. Miller Memorial Bridge taking Highway 101 across the Black River into the community of Matheson

- Location of the mouth of the Black River in Ontario

Location
- Country: Canada
- Province: Ontario
- Region: Northeastern Ontario
- Districts: Cochrane; Timiskaming

Physical characteristics
- Source: Unnamed lake
  - location: Kirkland Lake, Timiskaming District
  - coordinates: 48°13′16″N 79°58′17″W
  - elevation: 357 m (1,171 ft)
- Mouth: Abitibi River
  - location: Iroquois Falls, Timiskaming District
  - coordinates: 48°41′58″N 80°38′06″W
  - elevation: 239 m (784 ft)

Basin features
- River system: James Bay drainage basin

The Black River is a river in Cochrane District and Timiskaming District in Northeastern Ontario, Canada. It is part of the James Bay drainage basin, and is a right tributary of the Abitibi River. The municipality of Black River-Matheson is named after the river.

== Course ==
The river begins at an unnamed lake in geographic Morrisette Township in the municipality of Kirkland Lake, Timiskaming District, just north of Kirkland Lake Airport, and heads north into geographic Bisley Township in Cochrane District, then turns northwest, and enters geographic Melba Township in the municipality of Black River-Matheson. It takes in the left tributaries Little Black River and Whiteclay River, passes under Ontario Highway 572, takes in the right tributary Pike River, flows through the Black River Generating Station and dam, built in 1929, and passes under Ontario Highway 101 at the community of Matheson. From this point on, the original river course is flooded to the same elevation as the Iroquois Falls Generating Station on the Abitibi River at Iroquois Falls downstream. The Black River continues northwest, takes in the left tributary Watabeag River, enters geographic Walker Township in the municipality of Iroquois Falls, takes in the right tributary Shallow River and left tributary Driftwood River, and reaches its mouth at the Abitibi River. The Abitibi River flows via the Moose River to James Bay.

In Matheson-Black River, from the community of Wavell to the community of Matheson, both Ontario Highway 11 and the Ontario Northland Railway main line follow the river valley.

== Tributaries ==
- Driftwood River (left)
- Shallow River (right)
- Warbler Creek (left)
- Watabeag River (left)
- Russell Creek (left)
- Salve Creek (right)
- Pike River (right)
- Little Wildgoose Creek (left)
- Malloch Creek (left)
- Whiteclay River (left)
- Little Black River (left)
- Barnet Creek (right)
- Melba Creek (left)
- Cochenour Creek (right)
- Kellett Creek (left)
- Bisley Creek (left)
- Gourlay Creek (left)

== See also ==
- List of rivers of Ontario
