= List of rail accidents in Canada =

First table: 10 or more deaths
Second table: other notable events

== Worst railway accidents ==
| Accident | Date | Location | Killed | Injured | Description | Ref. |
|---|---|---|---|---|---|---|
| Jeannette's Creek train wreck | 27 October 1854 | Chatham-Kent, Canada West | 52+ | 48 | Believing a westbound Great Western Railway (GW) express had already passed, a locomotive engineer backed his 15-car gravel train from a siding onto the main line, where it collided with the oncoming express. The freight engineer and conductor were charged with manslaughter, but the outcome is unknown. | |
| Desjardins Canal disaster | 12 March 1857 | Hamilton, Canada West | 59 | 18 | A wheel fracture caused the leading wheels of a locomotive to derail. By this time, the westbound GW passenger train was on the Desjardins Canal bridge. Tearing the timber, the locomotive crashed through the bridge deck, dragging the passenger cars into the icy water. | |
| Beloeil train disaster | 29 June 1864 | Otterburn Park, near Mont-Saint-Hilaire, Canada East | 99 | 100 | At the controls of a westbound Grand Trunk (GT) passenger train (partly using repurposed grain cars), the engineer missed a warning light indicating an open swing span for the Beloeil bridge. The locomotive and cars plunged onto a barge passing on the Richelieu River. The engineer's prosecution is unclear. | |
| Shannonville derailment | 22 June 1872 | east of Shannonville, Ontario | 34 | 31 | When a breaking flange caused the leading wheels to derail, an eastbound GT locomotive plunged over an embankment. Two passenger cars telescoped and fell upon the locomotive, scalding the passengers with steam. | |
| Komoka passenger car inferno | 28 June 1874 | east of Komoka, Ontario | 10 | ? | When an oil lamp fell in a passenger car on a westbound GW mixed train, the fire rapidly spread, because of the delay in alerting the engineer to stop the train. In civil actions, awards to survivors for burn injuries ranged from $250 to $1,450. A payment for death was denied. | |
| Yamaska derailment | 28 June 1875 | west of Yamaska, Quebec | 10 | 25 | A westbound construction train of railway contractor Louis-Adélard Senécal comprised six flatcars loaded with workers pushed by a locomotive. On striking timber laid across the track, the first five flatcars overturned. The identities of the culprits who placed the obstacle were never proven. | |
| Toronto High Park head-on collision | 2 January 1884 | High Park, Toronto, Ontario | 29 | ? | A light eastbound GT freight and a westbound GT commuter, comprising a locomotive and two wooden passenger cars, struck head on. The pushed furnace set the first passenger car alight. The freight engineer (Richard Jeffry) and conductor (George Barber) were negligent in failing to read the employee timetable carefully but were acquitted of manslaughter. | |
| St. Thomas intersection collision | 15 July 1887 | St. Thomas, Ontario | 17 | ? | At intersecting tracks in the town centre, a packed northbound GT excursion train rammed a tanker car of crude oil of a westbound Michigan Central Railroad freight. The wreckage fire spread to surrounding buildings, before a second tanker exploded, also injuring spectators. Air brake failure was blamed. | |
| St. George bridge derailment | 27 February 1889 | South of St. George, Ontario | 11 | 32 | While an eastbound GT express was passing the siding, a flange broke on a driving wheel, dislocating the coupling rod. After the derailed express blundered onto the bridge, a dining and a passenger car destroyed a bridge span before plunging to the creek below. Another car was left hanging over the gap. | |
| Hamilton junction derailment | 28 Apr 1889 | north of Hamilton, Ontario | 18 | ? | At the west/northeast/southeast junction, an eastbound GT express jumped the track on entering a curve. After crossing 59 metres (195 ft) of open ground, the locomotive struck a water tank. A series of cars telescoped and caught fire. A broken flange was blamed, but speed was likely a factor. | |
| Craig Road rear-end collision | 9 July 1895 | northeast of Saint-Agapit, Quebec | 14 | 38 | The first of two northeast-bound GT excursion trains stopped on the main line at Craig Road station, while waiting for an approaching freight train to enter the passing track. Failure to slow before plowing into the rear of the first train indicated negligence by the deceased crew of the following GT locomotive. | |
| Point Ellice Bridge disaster | 26 May 1896 | Victoria, British Columbia | 55 | ? | The bridge collapsed while a streetcar with about 124 passengers was crossing, causing Car No. 6 and roadway users to plunge into the harbour. Primarily to blame was the Consolidated Electric Railway for the overloaded streetcar. For contributory negligence, the municipality paid victims a total of $150,000. | |
| Murray Hill head-on collision | 15 November 1898 | west of Peterborough, Ontario | 11 | 14 | Ignoring a red light and unaware the switch was not reset to enter the southern passing track, a GT westbound express collided head on with a slow-moving eastbound freight train on the northern track. The passenger cars telescoped. | |
| Wanstead angled collision | 26 December 1902 | Wanstead, Ontario | 28 | 32 | After waiting for the western switch to be unfrozen, an eastbound GT freight train proceeded to enter the passing track but not before a westbound GT express approached along the main line. The impact overturned both locomotives and telescoped the forward passenger cars. Communications breakdowns between dispatchers were to blame. | |
| Sand Point head-on collision | 9 February 1904 | west of Sand Point, Ontario | 13 | 23 | A westbound Canadian Pacific Railway (CP) express failed to stop for train orders at Sand Point. About 3 kilometres (2 mi) farther west, the locomotive and an eastbound CP express struck head on. Some westbound passenger cars telescoped. This crew was found negligent but faced no charges. | |
| Azilda head-on collision | 12 September 1906 | Azilda, Ontario | 12 | ? | A westbound CP passenger train was stationary at the eastern switch before entering the passing track. Brake failure on an eastbound CP express led to a head-on crash with the other train. An incorrectly closed valve on the rear of the baggage car caused the loss of air brakes on the following passenger cars. | |
| Lakeview head-on collision | 10 November 1909 | south of Trout Lake, East Vancouver, British Columbia | 15 | 9 | A runaway northwest-bound BCER flatcar loaded with lumber crashed into a southeast-bound BCER streetcar. The brakeman aboard the flatcar had tried to reset the brakes before jumping to safety. The coroner's court was unable to determine whether the flatcar had been properly coupled prior to the incident. | |
| Kilby Creek washout | 28 November 1909 | south of Lougheed Mall, Burnaby, British Columbia | 22 | ? | Heavy rain had weakened the culvert at Kilby Creek (Lost Creek). When an eastbound Great Northern Railway (GN) work train was crossing the creek, the locomotive had reached the other side prior to the culvert collapsing. A boxcar, carrying a Japanese work gang, and a flatcar, plunged into the ravine. | |
| Spanish River derailment | 21 January 1910 | west of Webbwood, Ontario | 43 | 38 | On the approach, a passenger car midway along a westbound CP express derailed but was safely dragged across the bridge. The next car slammed into the bridge superstructure and split in half. One half burst into flames, the other plunged into the icy river, accompanied by the next two cars. | |
| Rogers Pass avalanche | 4 March 1910 | Rogers Pass, British Columbia | 62 | 0 | While clearing an avalanche blocking the track, a CP section gang was buried by a second avalanche. The impact hurled a 91-ton locomotive and plow 15 metres (49 ft) and splintered wooden boxcars. Rescuers found only one survivor, the remainder were frozen corpses. | |
| Queenstown derailment | 7 July 1915 | south of Niagara Falls, Ontario | 15 | 88 | After a descending Niagara Falls and Victoria Park Railway streetcar passed the first curve (only safety switch), motor power was lost when the pole left the overhead wire, the air brakes failed, and only the handbrake was operational. The car negotiated two sharp curves but plunged over an embankment at the third. | |
| Brandon head-on collision | 12 January 1916 | Brandon, Manitoba | 19 | ? | On the main line (adjacent to the rail yard) an eastbound CP livestock train, and a westbound CP snow-clearing train being pushed, gently collided during poor visibility. The impact rammed the caboose into a buckled flatcar, slicing the former, where about 30 workers were sheltering from the bitter cold. | |
| Drocourt head-on collision | 20 March 1929 | northwest of Drocourt, Ontario | 17 | 19 | Eastbound and westbound Canadian National Railway (CN) transcontinentals crashed head on. The latter had failed to stop for train orders at Drocourt. The westbound conductor was killed, and the negligent engineer was acquitted of manslaughter. | |
| Crerar derailment | 27 June 1930 | Crerar, Ontario | 10 | ? | During stormy weather, a westbound CN freight train tipped over on encountering a sink hole. Eight of the dead were freighthoppers. The inquest was conducted in conjunction with the Capreol one, 42 km (26 mi) to the west. On the prior day, two passenger cars from an eastbound CN express derailed and plunged into the Vermillion River from the embankment curve, killing five and injuring 36. | |
| Dundas rear-end collision | 25 December 1934 | west of Dundas, Ontario | 15 | 30+ | While his eastbound CN passenger train parked on a siding, a brakeman headed to Dundas to arrange a replacement locomotive. Falsely believing his own train was on the main line, he reset the switch sending an approaching CN express into the siding and the rear of his train but was acquitted of manslaughter. | |
| Downie snow clearing accident | 2 March 1936 | east of Albert Canyon, British Columbia | 16 | ? | When a snowslide engulfed a freight train 6.8 km (4.2 mi) east of Albert Canyon, a work gang began snow removal, but the rescued tender under tow broke loose and ran back down the track. Two occupants jumped safely, but a third jumped to his death. The speeding tender plowed into the work gang causing devastation. | |
| Louiseville truck/train crash | 15 August 1936 | near Louiseville, Quebec | 22 | 12 | A CP freight train sliced a truck attempting to cross the tracks, which was carrying a group returning from a political rally. | |
| Almonte rear-end collision | 27 December 1942 | Almonte, Ontario | 36 | 155 | A southeast-bound CP troop train ran into the rear of a CP local passenger train stopped at the station. The troop train conductor drowned himself before the inquest, which focussed on the absence of adequate warning devices to indicate the presence of the first train. | |
| Aldershot bus/train crash | 10 September 1943 | Aldershot, Burlington, Ontario | 12 | 2 | When a fast eastbound CN passenger train struck a Canada Coach Lines bus stalled on the Waterdown Rd railway crossing, the bus was sliced and dragged several hundred metres. The deceased driver was found negligent. | |
| Dugald rail accident | 1 September 1947 | Dugald, Manitoba | 31 | 85 | A westbound CN excursion train, which failed to stop at the east switch and enter the passing track, collided head on with a stationary eastbound Continental Ltd on the main line. Gas-lit wooden cars burst into flames. Primary blame was on the westbound crew for disobeying train orders and excessive speed. | |
| Canoe River train crash | 21 November 1950 | north of Valemount, British Columbia | 21 | 58 | Faulty train orders provided to a westbound CN troop train led to a head-on collision with an eastbound CN Continental Ltd. Both trains tumbled down an embankment. Most casualties occurred in the wooden cars of the troop train. A telegraph operator was acquitted of manslaughter. | |
| Lamont bus/train crash | 29 Nov 1960 | Lamont, Alberta | 17 | 25 | A westbound CN freight train shattered a school bus negotiating an unguarded railway crossing. The bus driver appeared to have been blinded by the rising sun in that direction. | |
| Dorion level crossing accident | 7 October 1966 | Dorion, Quebec | 19 | 26 | An eastbound CN freight train struck a school bus on a railway crossing. The coroner's report concluded that two students on the bus, who were not expecting another train, had raised the crossing barrier after a westbound train had passed. | |
| Hinton train collision | 8 February 1986 | west of Dalehurst, Alberta | 23 | 71 | A westbound CN freight train, which ran a red signal before leaving a portion of double track, collided head on with an eastbound Via Rail Super Continental. The estimated cost of the accident was $35 million. The three freight crew members may have been asleep or otherwise incapacitated. | |
| Lac-Mégantic rail disaster | 6 July 2013 | Lac-Mégantic, Quebec | 47 | ? | An unattended 73-car Montreal, Maine and Atlantic Railway freight train carrying crude oil rolled down the grade. On derailing in the town centre, multiple tank cars burned and exploded, destroying buildings. The locomotive engineer, rail traffic controller, and operations manager were acquitted of criminal negligence. | |

== Other major railway accidents ==
| Accident | Date | Location | Killed | Injured | Description | Ref. |
|---|---|---|---|---|---|---|
| Stittsville head-on collision | 14 October 1897 | east of Stittsville, Ottawa, Ontario | 5 | 1 | A communications breakdown between a dispatcher and the conductor of an eastbound CP express led to a collision with a westbound CP freight train. | |
| 1906 Nairn derailment | 1906 | near Nairn, Sudbury District, Northern Ontario | 1 | Multiple | A passenger train derailed to the east of Nairn at a curve which was subsequently gentled. | |
| Horseshoe Curve derailment | 3 September 1907 | Caledon, Ontario | 7 | 114 | Excessive speed around a sharp curve overturned the locomotive and destroyed four of the seven wooden cars on an eastbound CP excursion train. The conductor and engineer, who were found negligent by the coroner's court, were later acquitted of manslaughter. | |
| Windsor Station crash | 17 March 1909 | Montreal, Quebec | 5 | 18 | A steam plug blow out on the Boston express led to the train smashing through the granite wall of the station building. The locomotive engineer and four people in the waiting room died. | |
| Marathon derailment | 10 July 1910 | near Marathon, Ontario | 3 | 0 | CP 694 derailed and fell into Lake Superior, killing its three crew members. The wreck of the locomotive was discovered by divers in the mid-2010s. | |
| McKellar derailment | 25 June 1913 | McKellar, Ottawa, Ontario | 8 | 50 | The fourth and fifth cars on a westbound CP passenger train derailed and plunged down an embankment into the river. A loose rail was believed to be the cause. | |
| Beattie Siding collision | 31 July 1913 | east of Otter Lake, Ontario | 5 | 2 | The two locomotives and five cars on a freight train derailed on striking a herd of sleeping cattle. | |
| Saint-Polycarpe rear-end collision | 27 December 1916 | Saint-Polycarpe, Quebec | 6 | 5 | Believing an eastbound CP express had already passed, an eastbound CP local train entered the main line, where the express rear ended it. | |
| Deroche automobile/train crash | 12 May 1922 | Deroche, British Columbia | 6 | 0 | At a private railway crossing, a westbound CP passenger train struck an automobile. | |
| Jessica derailment | 5 September 1926 | northeast of Hope, British Columbia | 4+ | 0 | An air brake failure led to a runaway westbound CP freight train derailing near Jessica station and plunging into the canyon. Only charred bone fragments remained of the four crew and up to seven freighthoppers. | |
| Cataraqui automobile/train crash | 31 December 1928 | east of Kingston, Ontario | 8 | 0 | At an unguarded railway crossing, an eastbound CN express struck an automobile. | |
| Belleville crash | 19 January 1929 | Belleville, Ontario | 2 | 1 | The train's engine overturned on a wooden bridge that was washed out due to flooding. | |
| Tignish train crash | 21 February 1932 | near Tignish, Prince Edward Island | 4 | 11 | A snowstorm resulted in a train getting stuck in a snow drift. Another train collided head on with the stuck train. The incident is considered PEI's worst rail accident. | |
| Cataraqui automobile/train crash | 6 October 1945 | Chesterville, Ontario | 6 | 0 | At an unguarded railway crossing, an eastbound CP freight train struck an automobile. | |
| Coniston bus/train crash | 9 February 1951 | Coniston, Ontario | 9 | 30 | A westbound CPR "Montreal to Vancouver flyer" had passed through the Coniston railway station and was picking up speed when it slammed into a bus which was filled with local people, including a number of night shift workers at the local Inco smelter who were returning home from work. The crash was blamed on poor visibility. | |
| Petawawa automobile/train crash | 4 August 1952 | Petawawa, Southern Ontario | 5 | 1 | At an unguarded railway crossing, an eastbound CP freight train struck an automobile. | |
| Montreal metro fire | 9 December 1971 | Montreal, Quebec | 1 | 90 | A malfunctioning braking system caused a collision between a moving train and a parked one in the Henri-Bourassa terminal station garage corridor. A brake pad caught fire and started a rapidly-spreading fire which destroyed 4 trains (36 wagons). The train driver died from the smoke while stuck in the front cabin. At least 40 firemen and 50 policemen were treated for injuries and asphyxia symptoms (sulphuric acid fumes and nitrogen gas). | |
| Dowling truck-train collision | 9 November 1973 | Dowling, Ontario | 0 | 0 | On November 9, 1973, a truck-train collision caused a 1,100-gallon spill at the New Cobden Road crossing just off Highway 144 in Dowling, Ontario, more than 20 miles northwest of Sudbury. It wasn't until four years later, when traces of PCBs were found in the water table, that CP Rail, the company also involved in the Mississauga disaster, was ordered to clean up the spill. | |
| Scarborough bus/train crash | 12 Dec 1975 | Scarborough, Toronto, Ontario | 9 | 20 | A westbound GO Transit train collided with a Toronto Transit Commission bus at the railway crossing between Danforth Road and Midland Avenue just north of the Scarborough GO Train Station. A faulty switch on the rear door had caused the bus to stop while straddling the track. | |
| 1979 Turbo Train fire | 29 May 1979 | near Morrisburg, Ontario | 0 | 0 | A UAC TurboTrain operated by Via Rail on westbound service from Montréal to Toronto caught fire after developing an oil leak. A third of the train was totally destroyed, though there were no deaths or injuries due to a rapid evacuation. This was the last major incident for the troubled Turbo Trains, which were retired in 1982. | |
| 1979 Mississauga train derailment | 10 November 1979 | Mississauga, Ontario | 0 | 0 | A CP freight train hauling large quantities of explosives and dangerous chemicals derailed, exploded, and caught fire in Mississauga, Ontario. Over 200,000 people were evacuated from the area, the largest evacuation in North America until Hurricane Katrina. In the negotiations that followed, CP dropped its longstanding opposition to passenger trains on the line, resulting in the opening of GO Transit Milton line service. | |
| Iroquois fire truck/train crash | 20 Mar 1981 | Iroquois, Ontario | 5 | 1 | At a railway crossing, a westbound CN freight train struck a fire truck, which drove around the lowered crossing barrier after an eastbound train had passed. | |
| 1995 Russell Hill subway accident | 11 August 1995 | Toronto, Ontario | 3 | 30+ | A southbound Line 1 Yonge–University subway train on the University line between St. Clair West and Dupont station struck the rear of a stationary subway train. | |
| VIA Rail Passenger Train No. 74 derailment | 23 April 1999 | Mile 46.7, CNR Chatham Sub., Thamesville, Ontario | 2 | 81+ | VIA Rail train No. 74, travelling eastward on the north main track of the CNR Chatham Sub., at Thamesville, Ontario, encountered a reversed switch, crossed over to the south main track and derailed at Mile 46.7. The derailed train collided with stationary rail cars on an adjacent south yard siding. The two locomotive crew members died in the collision, but not before warning oncoming VIA Rail train No. 71 of the impending derailment/collision, preventing a greater tragedy from unfolding. Of the 186 passengers on board, 4 were admitted to hospital w/ serious injuries; 77 treated in hospital and released; and an unknown number provided First Aid treatment at the scene. | |
| Northlander derailment | 6 February 2001 | Toronto, Ontario | 0 | 2 | An Ontario Northland Railway Northlander passenger train derails in the Don Valley. 2 passengers are injured. | |
| 2001 Stewiacke Via derailment | 12 April 2001 | Stewiacke, Nova Scotia | 0 | 22 | Via Rail's Ocean, travelling westbound from Halifax to Montreal at around 50 mph, derailed at milepost 46.45 of CN's Bedford Subdivision after a young boy removed the lock on an industrial track switch. | |
| Prescott Derailment | 4 July 2005 | Prescott, Ontario | 0 | 0 | An eastbound CN unit tank train derailed on a bent track caused by extreme heat conditions; no fires were reported. Approximately 2,000 feet of main track was destroyed. | |
| Cheakamus River derailment | 5 August 2005 | Cheakamus River, British Columbia | 0 | 0 | A CN freight train derailed into the Cheakamus River, leaking sodium hydroxide and killing over 500,000 fish. | |
| 2009 Oshawa derailment | 5 June 2009 | Oshawa, Ontario | 0 | 0 | Derailment of a train carrying dangerous goods prompts evacuation of hundreds of people from their homes. | |
| 2012 Burlington Via derailment | 26 February 2012 | Burlington, Ontario | 3 | 46 | An eastbound Via Rail train 92 travelling from Niagara Falls to Toronto derailed east of Aldershot station. | |
| 2013 Wanup Train derailment | 2 June 2013 | Wanup, Ontario | 0 | 0 | A rail bridge crossing the Wanapitei River near the community of Wanup collapsed, causing a train derailment and spilling a number of cars carrying containers into the river. | |
| 2013 Ottawa bus–train crash | 18 September 2013 | Ottawa, Ontario | 6 | 35 | Via Rail train 51 struck an OC Transpo double-decker bus en route from Ottawa to Toronto at a level crossing. | |
| 2014 Nairn derailment | April 2014 | near Nairn Centre, Ontario | 0 | 0 | A Huron Central Railway freight train derailed and leaked 25,000 litres (6,600 US gal) of diesel fuel into a local creek and wetland. | |
| Nipigon Train derailment | 14 January 2015 | near Nipigon, Ontario | 0 | 0 | Shortly before noon 22 rail cars left the CP rail track east of Nipigon, closing a section of Ontario Highway 17 as a precaution. Some of the rail cars carried propane which had caused a small leak. | |
| Ruel derailment | 14 February 2015 | near Ruel, Ontario | 0 | 0 | A CN train derailed at mile marker 111.7 at Gladwick, near Gogama, Ontario, spilling about 1.7 million litres of petroleum crude oil were released to either atmosphere or surface. No evacuations and injuries were reported. The fires burned for five days after the derailment. | |
| Gogama derailment | 7 March 2015 | near Gogama, Ontario | 0 | 0 | Several tanker cars caught fire after a CN train carrying crude oil derailed about four kilometers northwest of Gogama, Ontario prompting officials to advise nearby residents to stay indoors and avoid consuming water from local sources. Some of the rail cars that caught fire entered the Mattagami River system. | |
| Spanish derailment | 1 November 2015 | near Spanish, Ontario | 0 | 0 | Poor track conditions led to the derailment of a Huron Central Railway freight train. | |
| Ponton train derailment | 15 September 2018 | Ponton, Manitoba | 1 | 0 | A Hudson Bay Railway freight train carrying petroleum products derailed while crossing the Metishto River. The train's conductor was injured and subsequently bled to death. | |
| Field Hill derailment | 4 February 2019 | Field Hill, British Columbia | 3 | 0 | A CP freight train being operated by a relief crew derailed on Field Hill near Field, British Columbia, on a section of track with a steep descending grade and several sharp curves. The 3 crew members were fatally injured in the derailment. | |
| Levack truck-train collision | 22 May 2020 | near Levack, Ontario | 0 | 1 | A tractor-trailer that lost control of their brakes collided with a train at a crossing on Highway 144 south of Levack, derailing an empty box car. The driver of the truck suffered minor injuries. | |
| Goderich harbour derailment | 1 February 2021 | Goderich, Ontario | 0 | 0 | A Goderich–Exeter Railway freight train derailed during operations at the grain terminal at the harbour, destroying the Siddall Fish House, a heritage structure which was the last surviving example of the 19th century Goderich fishing industry. | |
| 2021 Crowsnest Pass derailment | 12 February 2021 | Crowsnest Pass | 0 | 0 | A CP freight train carrying potash derailed while travelling through the Crowsnest Pass in the Rocky Mountains. Two locomotives left the tracks along with at least 48 freight cars, with five cars falling into Crowsnest Lake. | |
| Prescott Head-on Collision | 2 September 2021 | Prescott, Ontario | 0 | 3 | A westbound CN intermodal train collided head-on with a local train parked on an industrial spur due to an improperly aligned switch. Three crew members sustained injuries, of which one was hospitalized. | |
| 2022 Grafton Derailment | 25 December 2022 | Grafton, Ontario | 0 | 0 | Fourteen CN rail cars derailed in Grafton, east of Cobourg, Ontario shortly after 11 am on Christmas morning. There were no injuries. The derailment including fallen trees during a snowstorm had also resulted in many cancellations to the VIA rail service and stranding passengers. | |

== See also ==
- List of deadliest Canadian traffic accidents
- List of disasters in Canada
