= Canoe River train crash =

1950 train crash in British Columbia, Canada

- Approximate location of the Canoe River train crash

Details
- Date: November 21, 1950; 10:35 a.m.
- Location: south of Valemount, British Columbia; 396 km (246 mi) west-southwest from Edmonton
- Coordinates: 52°45′48″N 119°15′54″W
- Country: Canada
- Line: Transcontinental mainline
- Operator: Canadian National Railways
- Incident type: Head-on collision
- Cause: Words omitted from order to troop train, causing it to proceed rather than pull onto a siding

Statistics
- Trains: 2
- Deaths: 21
- Injured: 61

On November 21, 1950, a westbound troop train and the eastbound Canadian National Railway (CNR) Continental Limited collided head-on by the Canoe River, near Valemount in eastern British Columbia, Canada. The collision killed 21 people: 17 Canadian soldiers en route to the Korean War and the two-man locomotive crew of each train.

The post-crash investigation found that the order given to the troop train differed from the intended message. Crucial words were missing, causing the troop train to proceed on its way rather than halt on a siding, resulting in the collision. A telegraph operator, Alfred John "Jack" Atherton, was charged with manslaughter; the Crown alleged that he was negligent in passing an incomplete message. His family hired his Member of Parliament, John Diefenbaker, as defence counsel. Diefenbaker joined the British Columbia bar to take the case, and obtained Atherton's acquittal.

After the accident, the CNR installed block signals on the stretch of track on which the crash occurred. The railway later realigned its main line in that area, eliminating a sharp curve that had prevented crews from seeing oncoming trains. Diefenbaker's successful defence of Atherton became an asset in his political rise. A number of monuments honour the dead.

== Crash ==
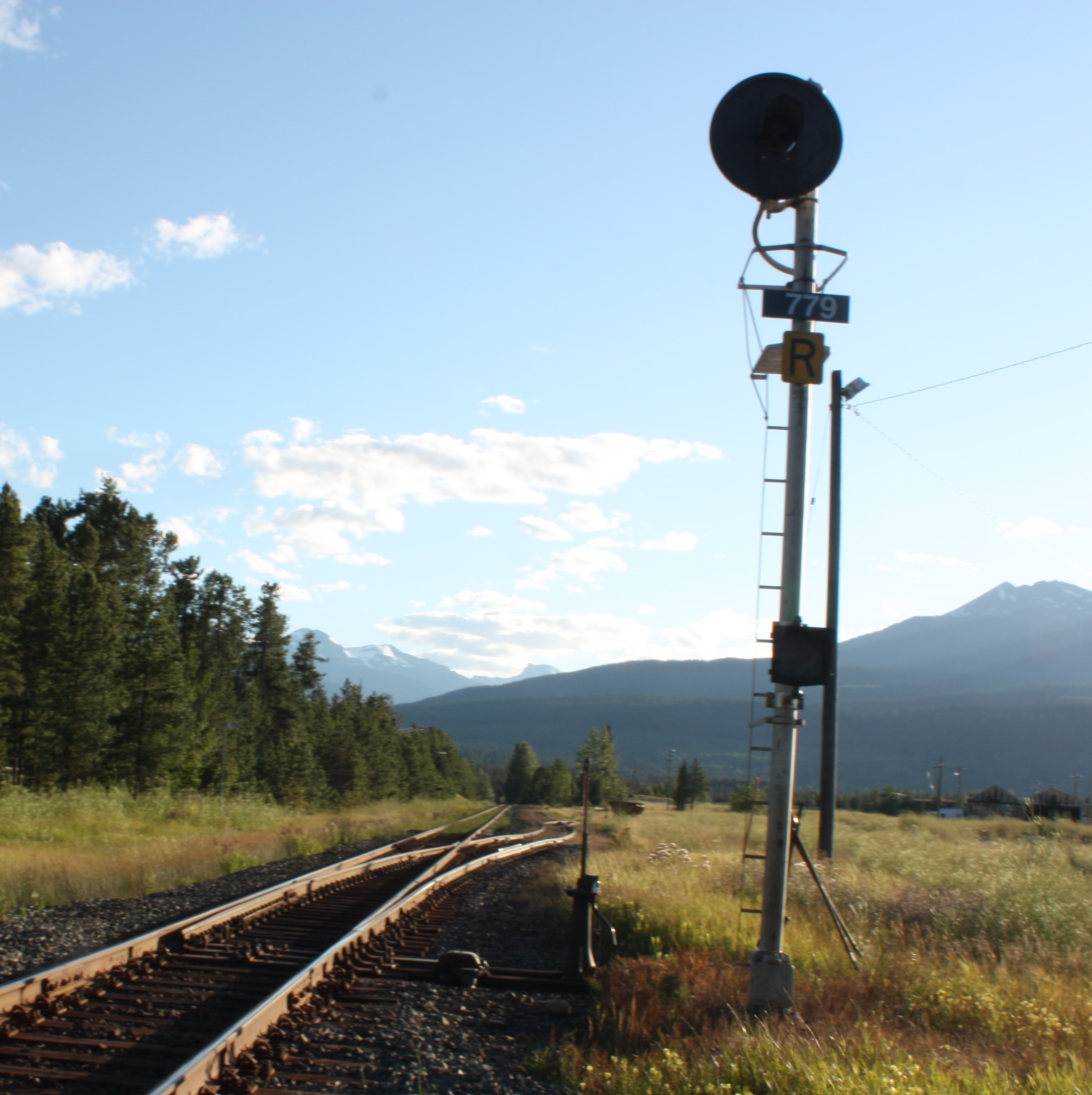
Cedarside, looking westbound in the direction of Canoe River, August 2011. The troop train should have stopped at Cedarside siding (righthand track).

On November 21, 1950, a westbound troop train, Passenger Extra 3538 West—consisting of the S-2-a class 2-8-2 steam locomotive 3538 and 17 cars, about half of which had wooden bodies with steel underframes—was travelling from Camp Shilo, Manitoba, to Fort Lewis, Washington, United States. It was carrying 23 officers and 315 other ranks of the 2nd Regiment, Royal Canadian Horse Artillery, for deployment to the Korean War, a movement dubbed Operation Sawhorse. The train was moving through the Rocky Mountains on the CNR transcontinental mainline. CNR Train No. 2, the eastbound Continental Limited, consisted of the U-1-a class 4-8-2 steam locomotive 6004 and eleven all-steel cars and was en route from Vancouver to Montreal.

By 1950, the CNR used the part-wooden cars only for the transportation of soldiers; other passengers were no longer carried in them. After the 1947 Dugald rail accident, the Board of Transport Commissioners had ordered that wooden passenger coaches not be placed between all-steel cars. However, under the terms of that decision, General Order Number 707, the wooden cars with steel underframes did not count as "wooden cars".

CNR dispatcher A. E. Tisdale meant to send both trains identical orders to "meet" (stop and wait for the other train to pass before proceeding) on a mostly single-track section. His intended order read "Psgr Extra 3538 West meet No. 2 Eng 6004 at Cedarside and No. 4 Eng 6057 Gosnell." (Note: Board of Railway Commissioners 1952, p. 263. The inquiry report discusses the fact that there was no "at" before "Gosnell" in the written order, as all three men agreed the word was transmitted. Parsons and Atherton attributed the fact that the word "at" was not copied down to oversights on their part.) (Cedarside and Gosnell were sidings where trains could wait to allow opposing traffic to clear.) Tisdale dictated the order from his office in Kamloops, British Columbia, to Alfred John "Jack" Atherton, the operator at Red Pass Junction, for delivery to Passenger Extra 3538 West, the troop train, and to F. E. Parsons, the operator at Blue River, 89 miles (143 km) westbound from Red Pass Junction, for delivery to No. 2, the Continental. The words "at Cedarside" did not appear in the order as copied down by Atherton to be handed to the troop train crew. Parsons's version of the order accorded with Tisdale's, and was passed to the Continental and to Train No. 4. According to Hugh A. Halliday in his history of Canadian railroad wrecks, "it would have been one man's word against the other, but the Blue River operator had been on the line at the same time. Parsons backed up Tisdale's version of events; Atherton would be cast firmly as the culprit in this affair."

When the westbound troop train stopped at Red Pass Junction, Atherton gave the incorrect written order to train conductor John A. Mainprize. As the full order had been passed to the eastbound Continental, its crew expected to meet the troop train at Cedarside, 43 miles (69 km) eastbound from Blue River; the crew aboard the troop train expected to meet both the Continental and Train No. 4 at Gosnell 25 miles (40 km) westbound from Cedarside. With neither train crew aware of anything wrong, the troop train passed Cedarside and the Continental passed Gosnell. Both trains were travelling at moderate speeds, and attempted to negotiate a sharp curve from opposite ends. Thomas W. Tindall, a forestry employee, saw the two trains approaching each other from an embankment; he tried to signal the Continental crew, who responded to his frantic signals with a friendly wave. The two crews did not realise that a collision was imminent until the last moment, and the trains struck head-on at 10:35 a.m.

The accident occurred south of Valemount, 0.6 miles (0.97 km) east of a small station named Canoe River, 5 miles (8.0 km) westbound from Cedarside. The crash took place on the only stretch (18-mile (29 km) long) of CNR mainline in the mountains not protected by automatic block signals. The leading cars of each train were derailed, while those which had been part of the troop train were demolished. According to testimony at the inquiry, most of the deaths were caused by steam from the troop train's ruptured boiler penetrating the damaged cars. At the moment of the crash, two soldiers, Gunners William Barton and Roger Bowe, both of Newfoundland, were buying cigarettes at the newsstand aboard the train. The structure of the newsstand shielded them in the crash, and they survived. Their fellow Newfoundlanders, Gunners Joseph Thistle and James A. White, standing just a few feet away, were not shielded by the newsstand and perished.

== Rescue ==
People from the nearby settlement of Valemount hurried to the scene and found the troop cars damaged beyond recognition. Some had collapsed in the disaster; rescuers used axes and hammers to break into them. There were no medical supplies aboard the troop train, and the only medical officer on board had disembarked in Edmonton. First-aid kits on that train proved empty; a box labelled "Medical Stores" was found to contain only contraceptives.

Dr. P. S. Kimmett of Edson, Alberta, a passenger on the Continental, took charge of efforts to aid the injured with his wife, a nurse. Kimmett supervised efforts to aid 50 people despite having almost no supplies or trained personnel. One soldier, still alive, appeared to have not an inch of skin on his body unscalded; another had a chunk of glass piercing his chest from front to back. With the exception of the engine and tender of the Continental, which were demolished, there was little damage to the eastbound train. Several of the passengers on the Continental suffered minor injuries. One dining car on the troop train was used as a hospital, another as a morgue. James Henderson, a young officer on the troop train, recalled:

I talked with one soldier who lay shivering in a bunk in the hospital coach. He had no visible sign of injury but his face was a ghastly green shade. He wanted more blankets and a cigarette, and I gave him both. An hour later, I helped move his body to the other coach.

At the time of the crash, the temperature was about 0 °F (−18 °C), and there was about 6 inches (15 cm) of snow on the ground. The telephone lines next to the track were cut by the accident, but a crewman managed to make an emergency call to Jasper in Alberta. Because the crash site was 83 miles (134 km) away, medical relief took three hours to arrive. A work engine, in the interim, took the movable coaches of the troop train back along the track as far as Cedarside. The hospital train brought eight nurses and two doctors from Jasper, who spent the trip making what preparations they could. On arrival, they found patients with severe injuries. "There was hardly a case with only one type of trauma." That rescue train transported the injured to Edmonton from the crash scene. The Jasper doctors left the train when the rescue train reached there, again placing Dr. Kimmett in charge. He remained so until the civilians were relieved by Army personnel from Edmonton, who joined the train in Edson. Major Francis P. Leask, commanding the soldiers, praised Dr. Kimmett's work, "We couldn't have gotten along without him" and also praised his men, both veterans and recruits, for their calm, efficient work in the disaster.

Wintry weather made subsequent attempts to recover the dead difficult; four bodies were never found. Transcontinental traffic was rerouted temporarily onto Canadian Pacific tracks through Calgary as the CNR attempted to clear the tracks. The work was hampered by an explosion and fire that broke out on the morning of November 22, consuming many of the wrecked cars and likely the missing bodies, and the wreckage was cleared by that evening, allowing traffic to resume the following day.

On November 29, 1950, the remaining soldiers left Camp Wainwright, Alberta, where they had been taken after being evacuated to Edmonton, resuming their journey to Korea. The death toll had been 20, including 16 soldiers. Twelve soldiers and the two two-man locomotive crews died in or shortly after the crash; four soldiers died on the rescue train en route to hospital in Edmonton. A 17th soldier, Gunner David Owens, died in an Edmonton hospital on December 9, bringing the death toll to 21. Owens had suffered severe burns, and was believed on the way to recovery when he suffered a relapse. Gunner Art Evoy, a survivor of the crash, recalled the eeriness of the first roll call at Wainwright, "It was a very small group that answered the roll call that day."

== Inquiry ==
Within days of the crash, the Royal Canadian Mounted Police (RCMP), as the provincial police for British Columbia, began an investigation. The site of the crash was under the jurisdiction of the RCMP detachment in Prince George, British Columbia, and any charges would be laid there. The CNR suspended all trainmen involved in passing the order to the troop train and held an internal inquiry at Kamloops. The Board of Transport Commissioners announced that a public inquiry would be held at Edmonton in December 1950.

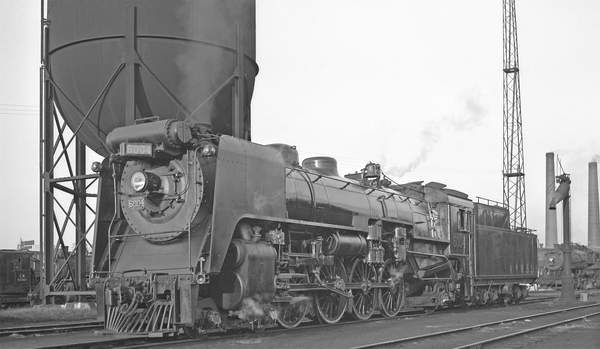
CNR engine 6004 (shown in 1943) drew the Continental and was destroyed in the wreck.

Atherton, aged 22, was dismissed by the CNR before the Edmonton hearings. He testified that there was a lengthy gap in transmission, and that he did not hear the words "at Cedarside". Although railway regulations called for him to listen to a repeat of the order by the telegrapher at Blue River, he did not do so and instead continued with his other duties, passing the message to the troop train without the vital two words. He denied repeating back the order to dispatcher Tisdale with the two words included.

Tisdale testified to passing the order by telephone to Blue River and to Red Pass Junction, and that it was correctly read back to him by both operators. He also testified to a brief gap in communications several days before the crash, saying that in the rough country through which the railway line passed it was not uncommon for objects falling against the communication line to cause brief outages. Parsons also testified that Atherton had correctly repeated back the order.

Testimony to the inquiry established the damage to the troop train and those on it. The wooden cars with steel underframes gave little resistance to the impact, unlike the Continental's steel cars. A CNR official testified that it would cost $127 million (equivalent to $1.67 billion in 2025) to replace all such cars with modern steel ones. Dr. Kimmett testified, stating that though he had six bottles of penicillin when he began his work, no syringe could be found to administer it. When a syringe was later found, five of the bottles could no longer be located. No heating was available on the troop train until the arrival of the emergency locomotive from Red Pass Junction, and no blood plasma had been brought on the hospital train—none was available until the injured reached Jasper. Dr. Kimmett testified that it was "very difficult" to administer plasma on the train, and that two men died between Jasper and Edson.

The Board of Transport Commissioners issued its report on January 18, 1951. It avoided assigning individual responsibility for the deaths and urged the CNR to install block signals on the section of line where the crash took place. The Board noted that the CNR already had a policy of installing such signals, though they were expensive and difficult to obtain from the United States, and that the CNR had deemed other sections of the line more dangerous. It also urged additional training, to ensure that messages were transmitted accurately, and safety checks to catch instances where messages were transmitted incorrectly.

== Prosecution ==
=== Hiring of counsel, arrest ===
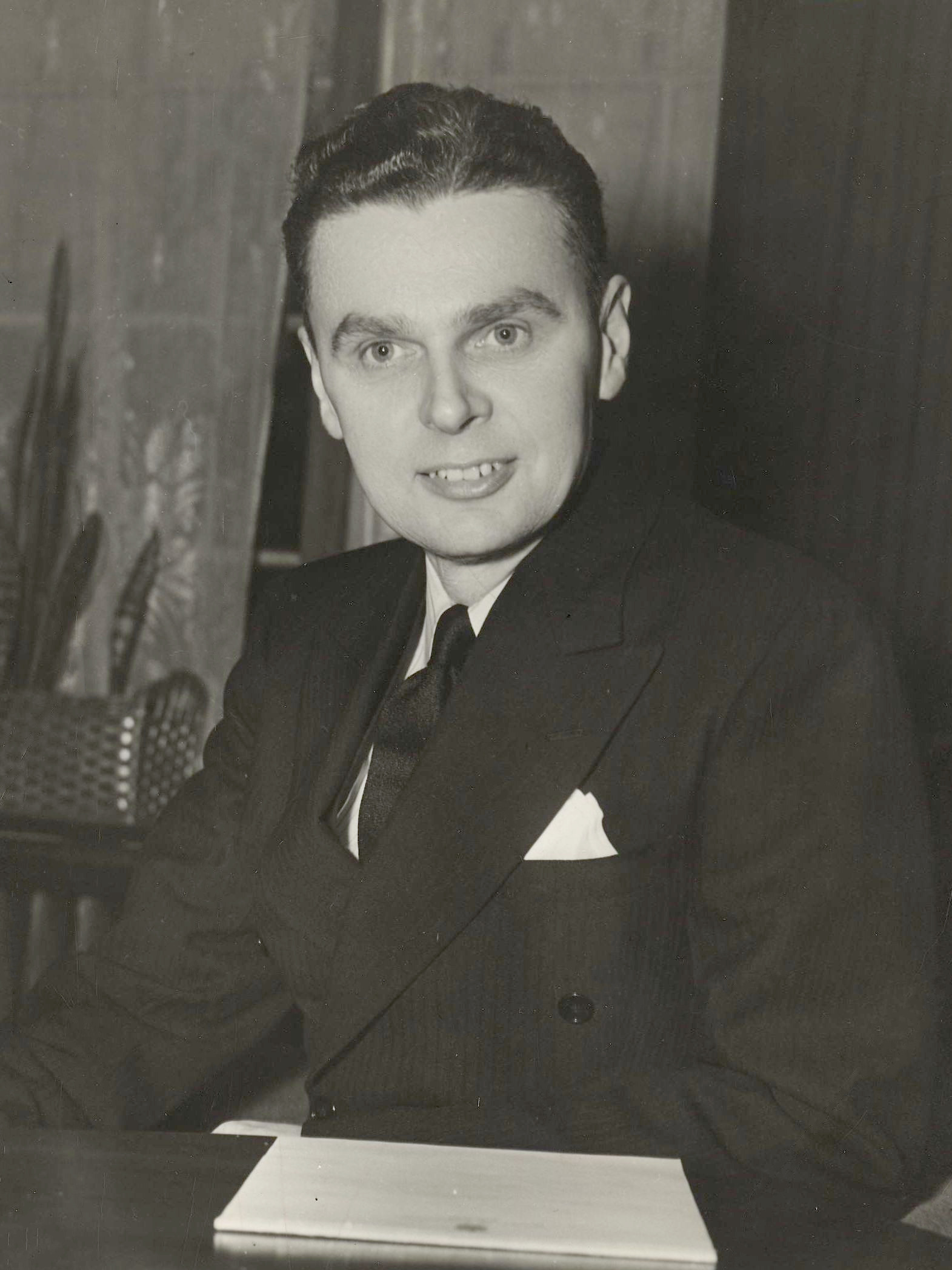
John Diefenbaker, seen soon after his election to the House of Commons, 1940

In anticipation of charges being laid against his son, Atherton's father approached Member of Parliament and King's Counsel John Diefenbaker in December 1950 and sought to retain him as defence counsel. The Athertons were Diefenbaker's constituents; their hometown, Zealandia, Saskatchewan, was in his riding, Lake Centre. Diefenbaker declined the case, stating that Parliament had first call on his time, that his wife Edna was seriously ill with leukemia, and that he was not admitted as a lawyer in British Columbia. As Edna Diefenbaker was well known as an influence over her husband, in desperation Alfred Atherton Sr. talked his way into her Saskatoon hospital room.

In his memoirs, Diefenbaker did not mention the elder Atherton's initial approach but wrote that he was in Australia at a parliamentary conference at the time of the Canoe River crash. An Australian lawyer pointed out the case to Diefenbaker; he thought it interesting but noted that he was not a member of the Law Society of British Columbia. Diefenbaker wrote that he planned to meet Edna in Hawaii on his way back from Australia. Instead she wired him, requesting that he meet her in Vancouver.

Diefenbaker related that he found his wife in a Saskatoon hospital, in the final stages of the illness that would kill her (she died on February 7, 1951). She told him that Jack Atherton had been to see her and that the soldiers' deaths were from being transported in wooden train cars. "Everyone in the CNR is running away from responsibility for what appears to have been a grievous disregard for human lives." John Diefenbaker objected that the bar examination in British Columbia was notoriously difficult and that the application fee was $1,500 (equivalent to $19,700 in 2025). Edna Diefenbaker informed her husband, "I told him you'd take it", and eventually her husband gave in.

Atherton was arrested for manslaughter on January 9, 1951, in Saskatoon and was taken to Prince George by the RCMP. After his dismissal by the CNR, Atherton was staying with his parents at Zealandia, where his father was CNR station agent. The manslaughter charge concerned the death of Henry Proskunik, fireman aboard the troop train. Bail was set at $5,000 (equivalent to $59,000 in 2025), and Magistrate P. J. Moran required any sureties to appear before him, making it difficult for Atherton's connections in Saskatchewan to obtain his release. Atherton was released from custody on January 24, as Prince George furniture store owner Alex Moffat and local CNR employee William Reynolds each posted sureties valued at $2,500 (equivalent to $30,000 in 2025).

After his wife's death in February 1951, Diefenbaker travelled to Vancouver in early March to take the British Columbia bar examination, which the Prince George Citizen called "a formality which will cost him $1500". (Failure to pass the bar would effectively disqualify Diefenbaker from the Atherton case because he would have to wait for reexamination, and the preliminary hearing was set for mid-March.) He paid his fee and was then given an oral examination by the bar secretary, which in full was:

"Are there contracts required by statute to be in writing?"

"Yes."

"Name one of them."

"A land contract."

Diefenbaker was then congratulated for being the first applicant to pass the British Columbia bar exam with a perfect score.

=== Hearings and trial ===
The preliminary hearing began on March 13, 1951, and lasted three days, during which the Crown called 20 witnesses. Diefenbaker alleged that the rules of the CNR did not require that the telegraph operator listen to the repeat of his message, but merely recommended that he should. Nevertheless, Diefenbaker's motion to dismiss was unsuccessful and Atherton was committed for trial before the Supreme Court of British Columbia (a trial-level court). Manslaughter was a charge for which the accused did not have the option of a speedy trial before a county court judge, and Atherton's case was set for the Spring Assizes in Prince George.

The trial began on May 9, 1951. Colonel Eric Pepler, a World War I veteran and British Columbia's deputy attorney general, led for the Crown while Diefenbaker led for the defence. To a CNR official on the stand, Diefenbaker said, "I suppose the reason you put these soldiers in wooden cars with steel cars on either end was so that no matter what they might subsequently find in Korea, they'd always be able to say, 'Well we had worse than that in Canada'." Colonel Pepler objected, stating that Diefenbaker had not asked a question. Diefenbaker responded, "My Lord, it was made clear by the elevation of my voice at the end of the sentence that there was a great big question mark on it." The judge, Justice A. D. McFarlane, began to rule, but Pepler interjected, "I want to make it clear that in this case we are not concerned about the death of a few privates going to Korea." Pepler intended to remind the judge that Atherton was charged in relation to the death of only the troop train fireman, but Diefenbaker pounced: "Oh, you're not concerned about the killing of a few privates? Oh, Colonel!" Diefenbaker recounted that a veteran, sitting on the jury, expressed shock at Pepler's comment, and Diefenbaker lost no opportunity during the rest of the trial to address Pepler as "Colonel".

The two lead counsel clashed again during their final addresses to the jury, with Pepler objecting to Diefenbaker's use of testimony from the preliminary hearing. Justice McFarlane stated to Pepler, "I do not think you should object like this", and when Pepler persisted, the judge "roared" at him, "Please, just stop this." Diefenbaker stated, "I sat and suffered while my learned friend misconstrued the evidence" and when he noticed Pepler muttering under his breath, said to him, "You are growling", to which Pepler replied, "Yes I am growling. I am objecting too."

Diefenbaker suggested to the jury that the silence on the line which had, he contended, swallowed the words "at Cedarside" might have been caused by a fish dropped on a snow-covered line by a bird and claimed to have evidence of a previous occurrence. He noted in his memoirs that the incident "was not well documented, but it was all we had". He blamed the disaster on Tisdale, stating that lack of the word "at" before "Gosnell" in the order indicated that the Kamloops dispatcher had not been paying attention, and that he should have noticed that, according to Diefenbaker, the words "at Cedarside" were missing from Atherton's repeat of the order. The trial had taken four days; the lawyers argued for five hours; Diefenbaker's summation took three of them. Justice McFarlane took an hour to charge the jury. McFarlane told the jurors that if they believed that Atherton had passed the order to conductor Mainprize in the same form he had received it, they would be justified in acquitting him. The jury returned after 40 minutes of deliberations. Jury foreman Fred Mounkley announced the acquittal of Atherton, as Atherton's mother wept.

== Aftermath ==
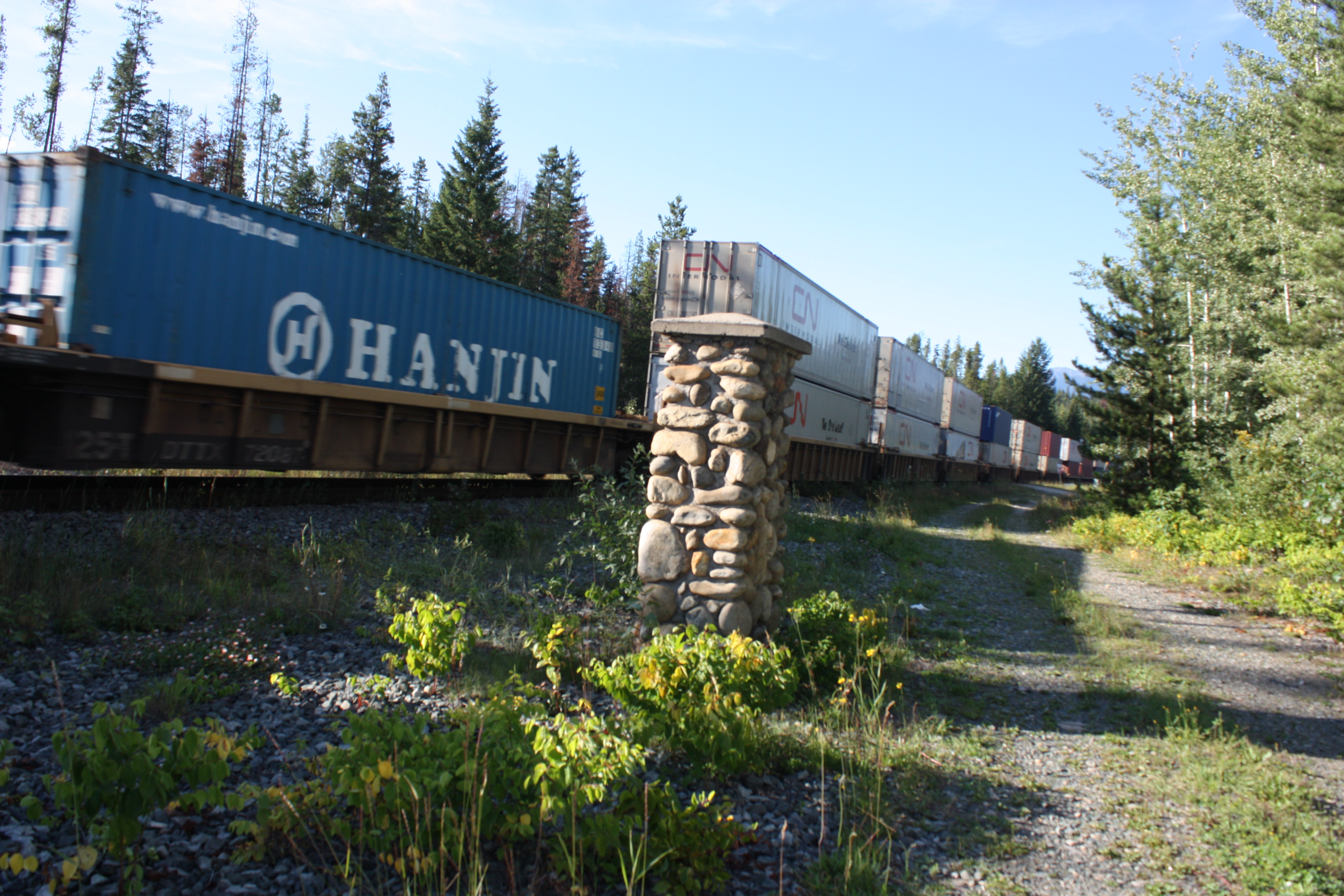
A freight train passes on realigned track near the disaster site.

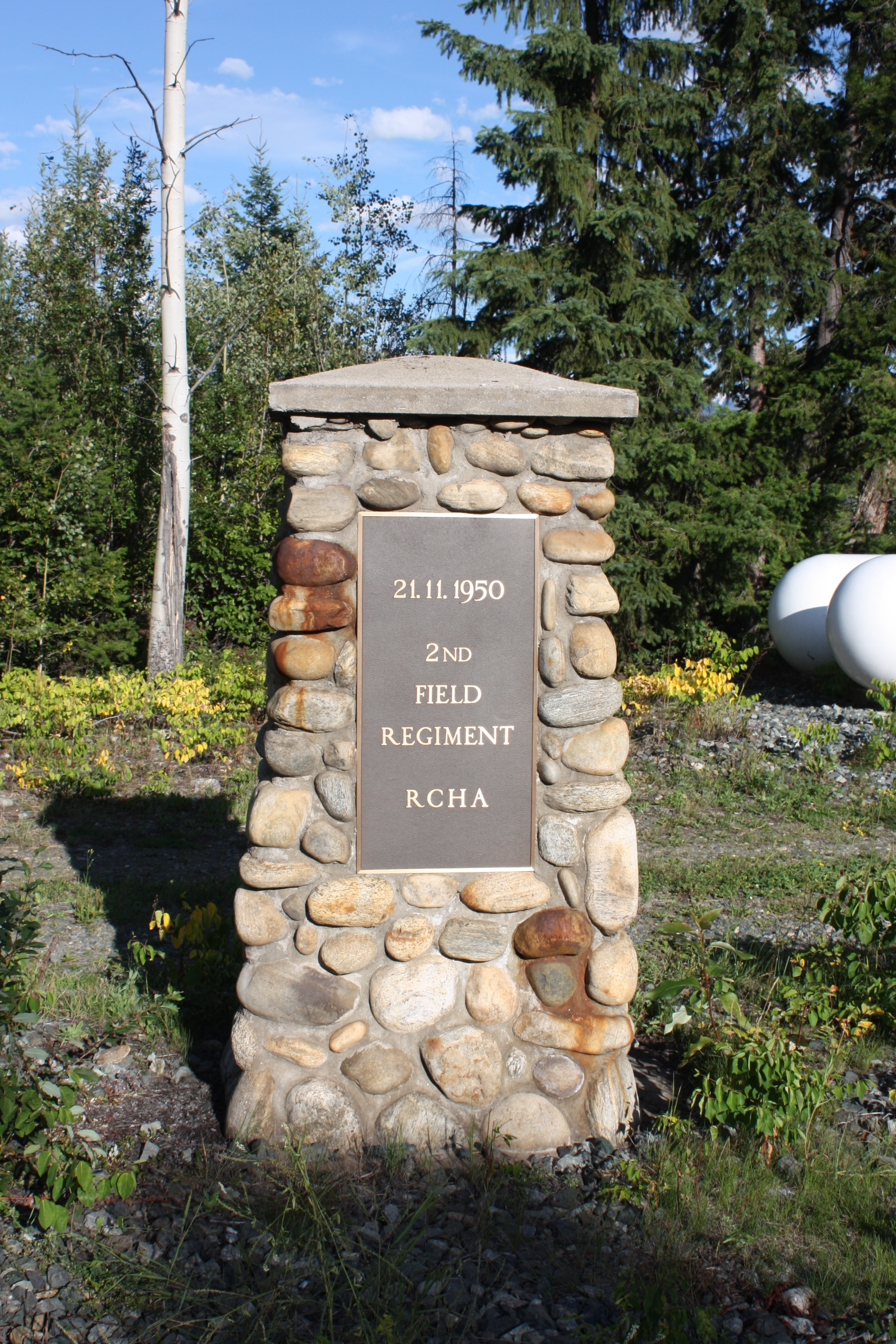
Monument raised to the soldiers who died in the crash by the Royal Canadian Horse Artillery near the Canoe River crash site

The CNR adopted the inquiry recommendations, installing block signalling in the area of the accident. In 1953, it modernised its passenger fleet, ordering 302 new cars. In later years, the line was rerouted to eliminate the sharp curve on which the disaster took place.

Atherton went to work for the Saskatchewan Transportation Company and settled in Saskatoon. Pepler retired in 1954, having served 20 years as British Columbia's deputy attorney general. He subsequently served as one of British Columbia's commissioners on uniform provincial laws and embarked on a revision of the rules of the British Columbia Supreme Court before dying on November 16, 1957, at age 66 in a suburban Vancouver hospital.

Diefenbaker had represented Atherton at his own expense, though donations from railroad employees reimbursed him for about half his costs. The case had been followed throughout Canada's railway community, and on his return to Ottawa, Diefenbaker was widely congratulated for his victory. By 1957, he had become Leader of the Opposition and Progressive Conservative Party leader, and when he campaigned in Saskatchewan during that year's election, Atherton travelled to Regina to greet him, skipping his own wedding rehearsal. As Diefenbaker campaigned in British Columbia, the Vancouver Sun reported on the large, enthusiastic crowds he gathered, and noted that he remained well remembered in Prince George for his defence of Atherton. Diefenbaker's biographer, Denis Smith, wrote of the Atherton case:

Diefenbaker had won a popular victory, redeemed his promise to Edna, and endeared himself for life to Jack Atherton and his fellow railway workers. The case was celebrated in the press and became one of his major political assets.

Diefenbaker won the election and, on June 21, 1957, became Prime Minister of Canada.

== Memorials and tributes ==
The RCHA suffered more casualties in the crash than it did in its first year of fighting in Korea. A monument to the soldiers who died stands at CFB Shilo (as Camp Shilo has been redesignated), where a memorial parade is conducted each year on the anniversary of the crash. It was dedicated on November 21, 1952.

A memorial cairn was erected near the crash site by the regiment in 1987. A special remembrance was held in Valemount for the 60th anniversary of the disaster in 2010. The CNR has also raised a monument near the site of the disaster. The names of the military dead are inscribed in the Korea Book of Remembrance and are also on the Wall of Remembrance in Brampton, Ontario; they may also be found on the Korea Cairn at Winnipeg Brookside Cemetery. Manitoba has named a lake for Gunner William D. Wright, who died in the crash.

The dead were not given posthumous Canadian Volunteer Service Medals as they never reached the Korean theatre; Tom Boutillier, a survivor of the crash, considered that an injustice and campaigned for medals to be awarded. In November 2003, Boutillier and other survivors looked on as five relatives of those killed in the crash received the Memorial Cross, with other relatives to receive the medal later.

== See also ==
- List of rail accidents in Canada
- List of rail accidents (1950–1959)
