= 2012 Burlington Via derailment =

Fatal rail transport accident in Ontario, Canada

Burlington VIA train derailment

Details
- Date: February 26, 2012; 15:30 (UTC−05)
- Location: Burlington, Ontario
- Coordinates: 43°19′33″N 79°50′02″W
- Country: Canada
- Line: Corridor
- Operator: Via Rail
- Incident type: Derailment
- Cause: Excessive speed on crossover.

Statistics
- Trains: 1
- Deaths: 3
- Injured: 46 (43 minor, 3 serious)
Location diagram
Key

The Burlington VIA train derailment was a derailment that occurred on February 26, 2012, in the Aldershot neighbourhood of Burlington, Ontario, Canada, resulting in deaths of the 3 engineers in the locomotive and 46 injuries. There were 75 passengers and four crew members on board at the time of the accident. The derailment occurred in an industrial area east of Aldershot GO Station. The official report into the accident was released on June 10, 2013, by the Transportation Safety Board of Canada (TSB) indicating that the crew misinterpreted the signal causing them to believe that they were authorized to proceed at track speed, when in fact they were authorized only for slow speed—a maximum of 15 mph (24 km/h)—in order to switch tracks.

== Derailment ==
On February 26, 2012, Via Rail train 92, led by Via Rail F40PH-2D 6444, an eastbound passenger train travelling the Corridor route from Niagara Falls, Ontario to Toronto, derailed in an industrial area east of King Road, north of Enfield Road in the Aldershot neighbourhood of Burlington, Ontario.

== Rescue ==
At the time of the derailment, there were 70 passengers, three locomotive engineers, and one service crew member on board the train. All three locomotive engineers, including one in-training, were killed in the derailment. Three passengers were airlifted to Hamilton General Hospital by Ornge air ambulance. Joseph Brant Hospital in Burlington treated twenty passengers with minor to serious injuries, while Credit Valley Hospital and Mississauga Hospital treated ten passengers.

== Investigation ==
The Transportation Safety Board of Canada (TSB) is the federal agency responsible for investigating incidents that occur with rail transportation, officials launched an investigation immediately after the accident. The main investigator-in-charge was Tom Griffith, who had been a senior investigator with the TSB since 1990. He has led 28 other rail investigations in his career.

On March 1, 2012, the Transportation Safety Board issued a statement demonstrating that in the immediate seconds surrounding the derailment, train 92 was executing a crossover from track 2 to track 3 at a speed of 67 mph (108 km/h), over four times the set limit of 15 mph (24 km/h).

On June 10, 2013, the final TSB report was issued. The report confirmed that the train was travelling more than four times the authorized speed while changing from track 2 to track 3. It concluded that the crew misinterpreted the signal indication when approaching the crossover and proceed at a speed appropriate for a train remaining on track 2. It also indicated that a maintenance crew was working on track 2 beyond the crossover, and that the attention of the locomotive crew may have been focused on the safety of this maintenance crew, diverting their attention from the signal indication. Furthermore, the previous signal which gave advance warning of the speed restriction was passed before a stop at Aldershot Station, and the locomotive crew may have forgotten about its indication while stopped for several minutes. It also concludes that since Via trains rarely change tracks at this crossover, the crew may have had a strong expectation that they would be remaining on track 2.

== See also ==
- List of rail accidents in Canada
- List of rail accidents (2010–2019)
