= Ponton train derailment =

2018 train derailment in Manitoba, Canada

Ponton Train Derailment

Details
- Date: September 15, 2018; 4:32 pm
- Location: The Metishto River 9 km southwest of Ponton, Manitoba; 543 km (337 mi) North-northwest from Winnipeg, Manitoba
- Coordinates: 54.5965°N 99.3283°W
- Country: Canada
- Operator: Hudson Bay Railway
- Owner: OmniTRAX
- Service: Freight
- Incident type: Derailment
- Cause: Roadbed washed out by flooding

Statistics
- Trains: One
- Crew: Two
- Deaths: One
- Injured: One
- Damage: One locomotive destroyed, diesel fuel leaked into the environment

The Ponton train derailment, near Ponton, Manitoba on September 15, 2018, fatally injured train conductor Kevin Anderson, injured the train's engineer, and triggered a spill of diesel fuel.

== Background ==
Hudson Bay Railway (1997) train number 995-15 was pulled by 3 locomotives: HLCX 1084, LLPX 2605 and GMTX 2146, all of which are GP38-2 diesel locomotives. They were hauling 27 railcars including "several dozen" tanker cars, loaded with "liquid petroleum". Initially Arctic Gateway Group reported that no oil had been spilled. On September 19 Global News described the train's cargo in greater detail, stating it included gasoline, liquid propane gas and butane. Global reported that while none of the cargo had been spilled rail workers were trying to contain diesel fuel that was leaking from the locomotives.

The train was crossing the Metishto River when it derailed. Accounts differ about when the train derailed. Global reports the train derailed at 6:45 pm. CBC reports the train derailed around 3:45 am. First responders arrived around 5:45. Anderson's autopsy stated Anderson died from blood loss, and his wounds were survivable. However he continued to bleed internally for hours after first responders arrived.

By September 20, several news sources reported that a safety investigator attributed the derailment to the work of beavers.

== Findings of the final report ==
April 23, 2020 the Transportation Safety Board of Canada released report R18W0237 which clarified much in the newspapers that had been contradictory or confusing. It found that:

In spring 2017 severe flooding resulted in washouts and serious track damage between Gillam and Churchill, shutting down that portion of the rail line. From that spring to the summer of 2018 OmniTRAX, the owner of Hudson Bay Railway at the time, did not invest in track infrastructure, despite the damaged areas of track. One of these areas was where the train would derail. The summer of 2018 saw 60% more precipitation than the historical average. This heavy rainfall contributed to water accumulating immediately east of and adjacent to the rail roadbed at the derailment site. (Note: This report has multiple errors and inaccuracies. The flood was to the south-southeast of the tracks, not the east.)

Wooden box culverts carried stream water under the rail bed at the accident site. The culverts were deteriorated and had been identified for replacement. However regulations did not require culvert replacement alone, so this was not done before the accident. Hudson Bay Railway engineers had been monitoring the high water levels in the area of the washout for weeks preceding the derailment and the last inspection had occurred two days before the incident. Sometime between then and the derailment, flood water had surged above the top of the culverts. It flowed through the saturated railway bed, dislodging and destroying them. The force of the torrent carried the culvert timbers as far as one thousand feet downstream from their original location.

Hudson Bay Railway reduced its beaver control program in 2017. Beaver activity had therefore been significant before the incident, both upstream and in the vicinity of the derailment, leaving track infrastructure vulnerable to washouts if beaver dams failed and released their reservoirs. Several dams were found to have had been breached, likely by the summer's heavy rains. The water from these breaches added to the water accumulating just east of, and immediately adjacent to, the derailment site. The increased hydraulic pressure on the raised sand-based bank that supported the railroad tracks contributed to its failure. The washout left the tracks in place so when the train crew approached they didn't realize there was a significant void beneath them and didn't apply the emergency brakes.

The railway's emergency response plan for a derailment only included providing a reporting structure and a general safety message. There's no record that the railroad conducted emergency response drills or reviewed any actual responses. Therefore railroad employees were not trained to respond to derailments involving injuries, deaths, or dangerous goods. Transport Canada was not proactively monitoring the railroad's emergency plan, so the potential problems weren't detected.

The train derailed about 2.35 mi (3.78 km) miles south of Provincial Road 391, which ran parallel to it at this point, and 9.1 mi (14.6 km) southwest of where Manitoba Provincial Trunk Highway 6 actually crossed the tracks 1.78 mi (2.86 km) south of Ponton. (Note: Figure 3 in the report misidentifies the accident site. The place marked does is not a visual match with the terrain surrounding the wreck in subsequent photos. It also is not 9 kilometres from the Highway 6 grade crossing.) This was a remote section of track where the only contact between train crews and the rail traffic controller was by radio. The controller would issue clearance for a train to travel across a long section of empty track. No other trains or personnel would be on the line and there would be no way for the rail traffic controller to know where the train is located at any given time or what was happening. No regulation required train crews to check in regularly by radio so Hudson Bay Railway did not require it. The derailment was discovered by accident when a helicopter pilot flew nearby to pick up some surveyors who actually heard the event.

=== The accident and response ===
- 4:32 pm - the train derailed while crossing the Metishto River 9.1 miles south of where Manitoba Provincial Trunk Highway 6. crossed the railway tracks.
- 5:15 pm - the civilian crew of a helicopter saw the accident from the air
- 5:35 pm - the helicopter pilot delivered the surveyors, returned to the accident location, landed on a sandbar, went to the actual site and called 911. (Note: The helicopter pilot had to climb on top of a rail car to get a cell signal.) However the operator was unable to pinpoint the location. The pilot then called a member of the Snow Lake detachment of the Manitoba Royal Canadian Mounted Police, reported the derailment and gave details of the situation. This was relayed to the RCMP control center, who called him back to get details on the location and what equipment might be needed.
- 6:07 pm - the Mounties told the railway traffic controller about the accident.
- 6:18 pm - the Mounties called the fire and emergency services in the city of Thompson, but didn't tell them at first that crew members were pinned in the wreckage or about the dangerous goods the train was carrying. (Note: The report doesn't specify if Thompson Fire was alerted by the Snow Lake RCMP detachment, who did not have all the details, or the central command of the RCMP, who did.) Thompson Fire dispatched two paramedics and an ambulance to travel the 97.23 miles (156.48 kilometres) to Ponton, the station closest to the accident site at just over 9 miles away.
- 6:23 pm - the rail traffic controller notified a Hudson Bay Railway supervisor of an accident south of Ponton that crew were pinned inside the locomotive and that the Mounties were at the scene. Hudson Bay Railway management was informed and they responded, departing from The Pas to drive the giant dogleg that was the 146.61 miles (235.95 kilometres) long road to Ponton. An engineer was sent (the report does not say from where) in a hi-rail truck. (Note: The report refers to this person as both an engineer and a railway track foreman.)
- 6:30 pm - the Mounties called the helicopter pilot and asked him to fly back to Ponton and pick up the two officers who had been dispatched to the grade crossing there. He did so.
- 6:53 pm - Thompson Fire was given photos and the information about the pinned crew and the dangerous cargo, but none of this was given to the Hudson Bay Railway. (Note: This would be the photos and information coming from the civilian pilot just over 90 minutes previously. The Mounties had not yet arrived to collect their own.)
- 6:55 pm - the helicopter carrying the Mounties arrived at the wreck site and they told the pilot and train crew that Thompson Fire were responding. The pilot flew to Ponton to pick up the Thompson Fire personnel and possible rescue equipment when they arrived.
- 7:00 pm - the Mounties reported smelling diesel fuel and possibly propane. They told Thompson Fire that they smelled diesel and that cars carrying liquefied petroleum gas might be leaking
- 7:05 pm - Standard emergency response practice is to keep first responders away from possible spills until a hazmat crew can assess the scene. Thompson Fire followed this and ordered the paramedics who were en route to keep away from the train until a crew could the assess the wreck. Though advised to stay clear of the scene, the Mounties remained with the crew members.
- 7:12 pm - Thompson fire dispatched a hazmat team to Ponton and requested an air ambulance from Winnipeg, but poor weather there prevented the helicopter from leaving. Another one at Island Lake would come later that night. (Note: The report says Island Lake is 250 kilometers from the derailment site but it's actually 300.) The fire chief and the remaining Thompson Fire responders then left for Ponton.
- 7:40 pm - the first group of paramedics arrived at Ponton, but they had no extraction gear with them. They were told the train crew needed first aid and pain medication, and replied that they'd been ordered to stay away until the hazmat team completed its assessment.
- 8:00 pm - the helicopter made one last flight to the accident site to deliver the blankets and heating pads the paramedics had brought. The Mounties were still with the crew members.
- 8:30 pm - Not equipped to fly in darkness, the helicopter left the scene for the last time.
- 8:50 pm - the hazmat crew arrived at Ponton, expecting railway personnel to have organized the scene. They hadn't realized the railway personnel had to travel a greater distance to get there. The hazmat crew had never experienced an accident of this size but the fire captain was fully trained in incident command structure, so he set up a staging area at a nearby gravel pit.
- 9:20 pm - a Hudson Bay Railway supervisor and superintendent arrived at the gravel pit. They had no experience with an accident this big either.
- 9:45 pm - all Thompson Fire personnel, including the Fire Chief, arrived. They attempted to send the hazmat team and paramedics in two ATVs pulling a rescue boggan down the rails but ten minutes later both ATVs had flat tires.
- 10:00 pm - a railway track foreman in a hi-rail truck arrived at the staging area. He was told to put the truck on the rails and pick up the Thompson Fire personnel. However he did not have the information which had been given to Thompson Fire at 6:53 and was not told which way to go so he left in the wrong direction. This mistake and dealing with the flat tires on the ATVs cost about ninety minutes.
- 11:46 pm - the pair of hazmat techs with the pair of EMTs arrive at the accident site. Within a minute they determine no LPG is leaking and begin treating the injured crew.

September 16

- 12:12 am - the second crew with the extrication equipment arrives and has great difficulty removing the large, thick components pinning the train crew.
- 12:53 am - Anderson dies of his injures while the EMTs attend him
- 1:00 am - the families are first informed of the incident. Before this there had been no contact with them.
- 2:30 am - the engineer is extricated from the locomotive and transported by hi-rail to the staging area
- 3:30 am - the helicopter from Island Lake transports the engineer to Thompson General Hospital in critical condition
- 4:00 am - all first responders are withdrawn to the staging area because of the dangerous cargo. Later that day the Urban Search and Rescue team of the Manitoba Office of the Fire Commissioner are requested remove Anderson's remains since they had the equipment and expertise.

September 17

The search and rescue team travels from Brandon to Ponton (700 km) in preparation for extraction the next day. Anderson's family was not told of any of this until 2:55 pm this day.

September 18

- 10:00 am - the search and rescue arrive at the accident site and begin the extraction
- 3:30 pm - Anderson's body was recovered and removed.

== See also ==
- List of rail accidents in Canada
