= CN U-1-a and U-1-b =

Canadian locomotive classes (1923–1962)

Canadian National U-1-a and U-1-b
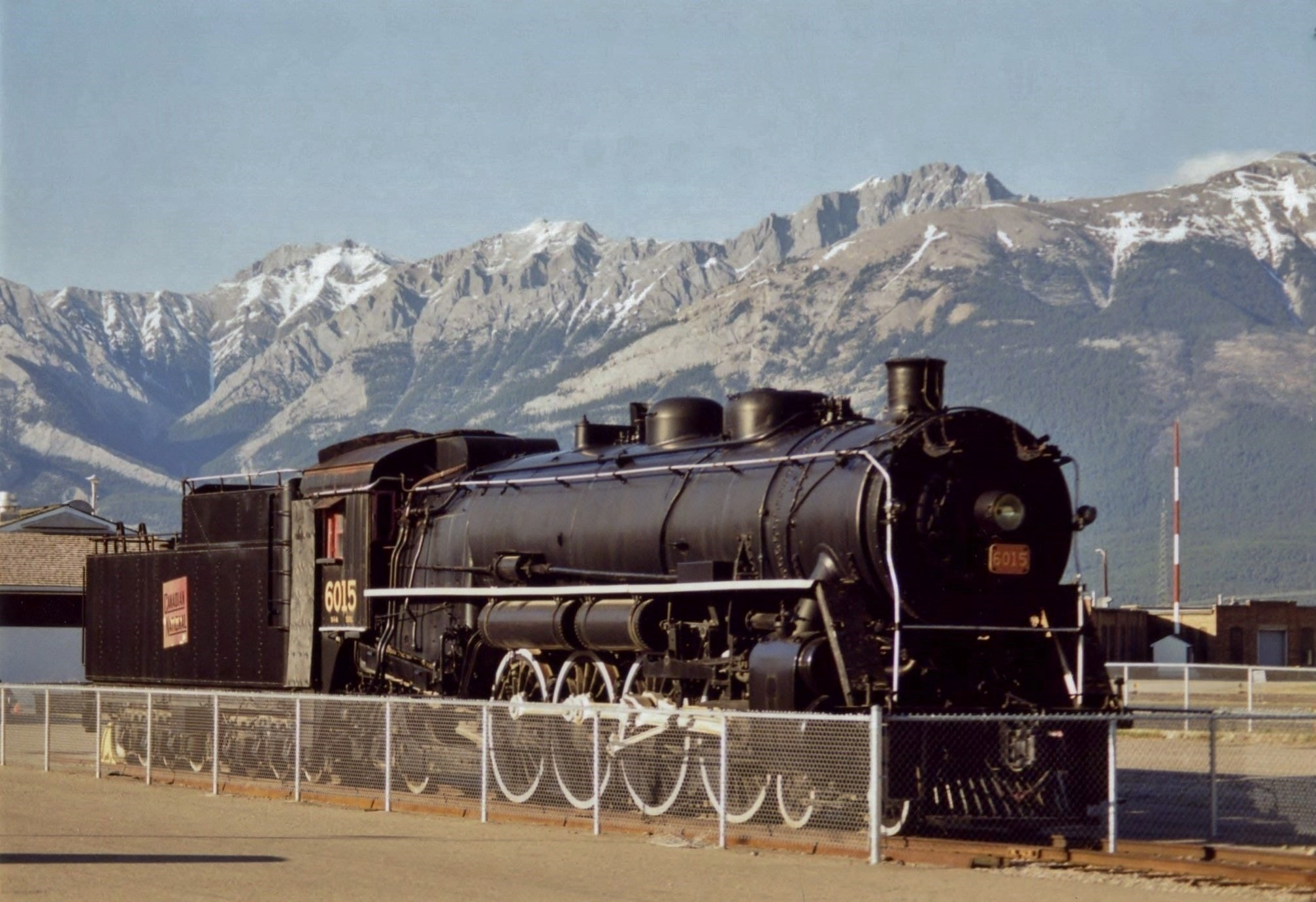
- Canadian Pacific U-1-a No. 6015 on display at Jasper, Alberta in 2000
Type and origin
- Power type: Steam
- Builder: Canadian Locomotive Company
- Build date: 1923–1924
- Total produced: 16 (U-1-a) 21 (U-1-b)
- Rebuild date: 1947 (1)
- Number rebuilt: 1 (No. 6001)
Specifications
- Configuration
  - Whyte: 4-8-2
  - UIC: 2′D1′ h2
- Gauge: 4 ft 8 1/2 in (1,435 mm)
- Leading dia.: 34 1/4 in (0.870 m)
- Driver dia.: 73 in (1.854 m)
- Trailing dia.: 43 in (1.092 m)
- Minimum curve: 16°
- Wheelbase: Loco: 41 ft 9 in (12.73 m)
- Length: 90 ft 4 1/4 in (27.540 m)
- Width: 10 ft 9 5/8 in (3.292 m)
- Adhesive weight: 233,790–235,390 lb (106.05–106.77 tonnes)
- Loco weight: 355,570–355,570 lb (161.28–161.28 tonnes)
- Total weight: 602,600–603,870 lb (273.33–273.91 tonnes)
- Fuel type: Coal or oil
- Fuel capacity: Coal: 17–20 long tons (17–20 t); Oil: 4,000–5,000 imp gal (18,200–22,700 L; 4,800–6,000 US gal)
- Water cap.: 9,500–10,000 imp gal (43,000–45,000 L; 11,400–12,000 US gal)
- Firebox
  - Grate area: 66.7 sq ft (6.20 m^{2})
- Boiler pressure: 210 lbf/in^{2} (1.4 MPa)
- Heating surface
  - Firebox: 319 sq ft (29.6 m^{2})
  - Tubes and flues: 3,730 sq ft (347 m^{2})
  - Total surface: 4,049 sq ft (376.2 m^{2})
- Superheater
  - Type: Schmidt
  - Heating area: 810–1,087 sq ft (75.3–101.0 m^{2})
- Cylinders: Two, outside
- Cylinder size: 26 in × 30 in (0.66 m × 0.76 m)
- Valve gear: Inverted Walschaerts
- Train heating: Steam heat
- Loco brake: Independent air
- Train brakes: Automatic air
Performance figures
- Maximum speed: 75–95 mph (121–153 km/h)
- Tractive effort: 49,590 lbf (220.6 kN)
- Factor of adh.: 4.71 – 4.74
Career
- Operators: Canadian National Railways
- Power class: 50%
- Number in class: 16 (U-1-a) 21 (U-1-b)
- Numbers: 6000–6015 (U-1-a) 6016–6036 (U-1-b)
- Retired: 1950 (6004) 1951–1962
- Preserved: 6015
- Disposition: 6015 preserved, remainder scrapped
- References for above

The Canadian National U-1-a and U-1-b class locomotives were two subclasses of 37 4-8-2 Mountain-type steam locomotives built for the Canadian National Railways between 1923 and 1924. They were retired between 1951 and 1962. Classes U-1-c/d/e were identical locomotives to U-1-b, built for the Grand Trunk Western. The later class U-1-f is covered elsewhere.

Table of orders and numbers
Year	Subclass	Quantity	Manufacturer	Serial Nos.	CN Nos.	Notes
1923	U-1-a	16	Canadian Locomotive Company	1696–1711	6000–6015	6015 preserved in Jasper, Alberta, since 1972
1924	U-1-b	21	Canadian Locomotive Company	1744–1758, 1764–1769	6016–6036	All scrapped

== Accidents and incidents ==
On 1 September 1947, locomotive 6001 was involved in the Dugald rail accident. It collided with another CN 4-8-2 numbered 6046. No. 6001 was later rebuilt by CN.

On 21 November 1950, locomotive 6004 was severely damaged a head-on collision with S-2-a 2-8-2 No. 3538 at Canoe River, British Columbia. It was scrapped in June 1951 (as was the 3538). There was a gap of four years before the next U-1-a or U-1-b went: two were scrapped in 1955, four in 1957, six in 1958, six in 1959, eight in 1960, seven in 1961, and the last two, 6000 and 6001 in 1962.

== In art ==
U-1-a 6004 is the subject of a 1924 publicity poster by C. Norwich. It depicts the locomotive speeding along in the foreground, while in the background is a pine-covered, snow-capped mountain peak. Across the top is the "Canadian National Railways" logotype; across the bottom are the words, "Across Canada", and in the lower left, above the artist name and date is "The Continental Limited in the Canadian Rockies"

== Preservation ==
Two locomotives have been preserved:

- CN 6015 (U-1-a) — Retired 1960; to CHRA, Delson, Quebec. On public display in Jasper, Alberta, since July 1972.
- CN 6043 (U-1-d) — Retired 1961. On public display in Assiniboine Park, Winnipeg, since March 1962.
