= Canoe River (British Columbia) =

Coordinates: 52°47′N 119°10′W

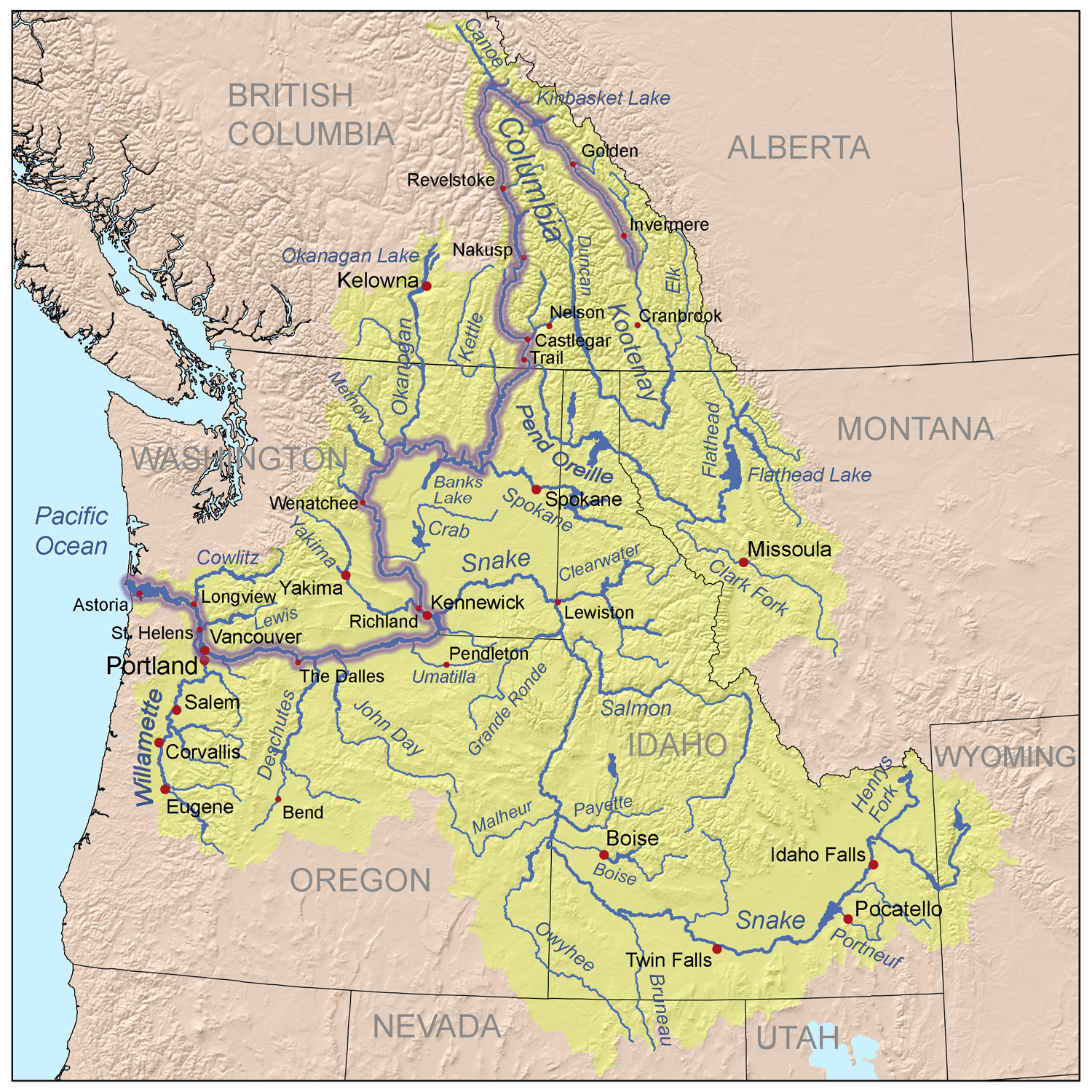
- Map of the Columbia drainage Basin with the Columbia River highlighted and showing the major tributaries. The Canoe River, its northernmost tributary, joins the Columbia at the Big Bend where the river turns south.

Location
- Country: Canada
- Province: British Columbia
- District: Cariboo Land District

Physical characteristics
- Source: Cariboo Mountains
- Mouth: Columbia River
  - location: Kinbasket Lake
- Discharge
  - location: below Kimmel Creek
  - average: 14.6 m^{3}/s (520 cu ft/s)
  - minimum: 0.991 m^{3}/s (35.0 cu ft/s)
  - maximum: 116 m^{3}/s (4,100 cu ft/s)

Canoe River is the northernmost tributary of the Columbia River in British Columbia, Canada. Its lower reach is flooded by the Mica Dam. The lower Canoe River is called Canoe Reach, part of the Mica Dam's reservoir, Kinbasket Lake.

== Course ==
The Canoe River begins in the Cariboo Mountains, west of Valemount, British Columbia, and flows east to the vicinity of Valemount, then southeast to join the Columbia River at the "Big Bend" of the Columbia, just upriver from Mica Dam. The reservoir created by Mica Dam, Kinbasket Lake, extends up the Canoe River nearly to Valemount. This impounded portion of the river is called the Canoe Reach of Kinbasket Lake. Although originally the mouth of the Canoe River was at the Big Bend of the Columbia, today it is said to be at the northern end of Canoe Reach.

The main tributaries of Canoe River and Canoe Reach include Camp Creek, Packsaddle Creek, Dave Henry Creek, Yellowjacket Creek, Bulldog Creek, Ptarmigan Creek, Hugh Allan Creek, Grouse Creek, Windfall Creek, Howard Creek, Foster Creek (flows into Foster Arm), Dawson Creek, and, right at Big Bend, Wood River (flows into Wood Arm).

Most of Canoe River, in the form of Canoe Reach, occupies the Rocky Mountain Trench, the same valley as the upper Fraser River and its tributary the McLennan River, which extends to Valemount. The Canoe River and Camp Creek, one of its main tributaries, drains a region just north and east of the headwaters of the North Thompson River.

== History ==
The Canoe River was named by David Thompson, who spent the winter at Boat Encampment near the river's mouth in 1811. From the early 1820s until 1846, the Canoe River was a well-travelled section of the York Factory Express HBC overland trade route between London via Hudson Bay and the lucrative Columbia District fur region headquartered at Fort Vancouver on the north bank of the lower Columbia River.

The river was the site of a rail crash, near Valemount, British Columbia, in 1950.

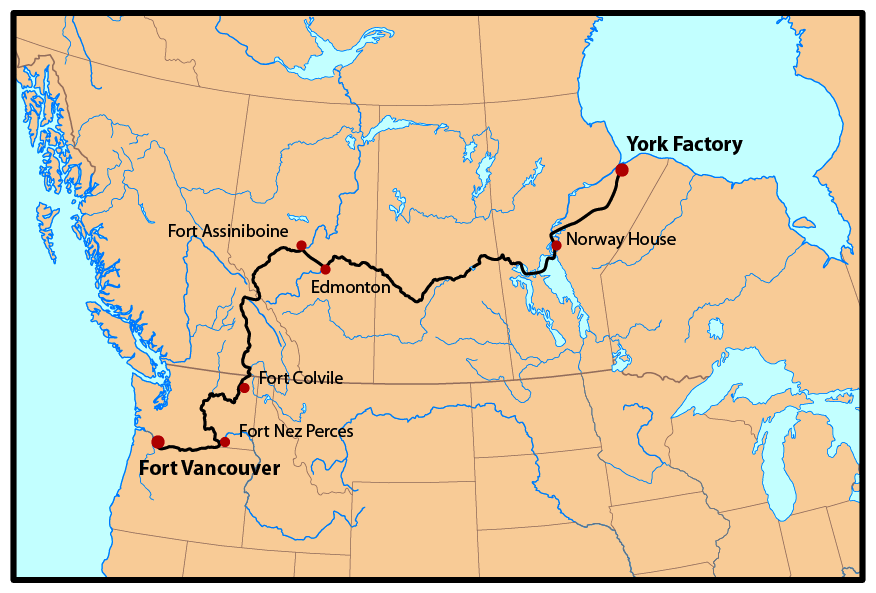
Map of the route of the York Factory Express, 1820s to 1840s. Modern political boundaries shown.

== See also ==
- List of rivers of British Columbia
- List of tributaries of the Columbia River
