= Cheakamus River derailment =

2005 train accident in Canada

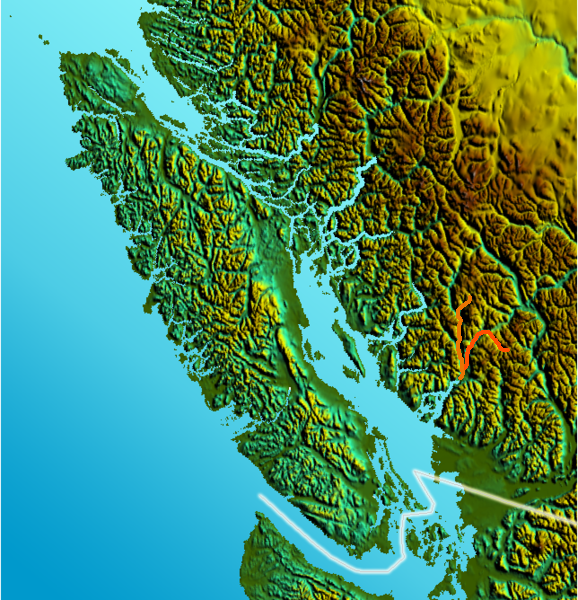
Map and location of the Cheakamus River, shown in the orange line

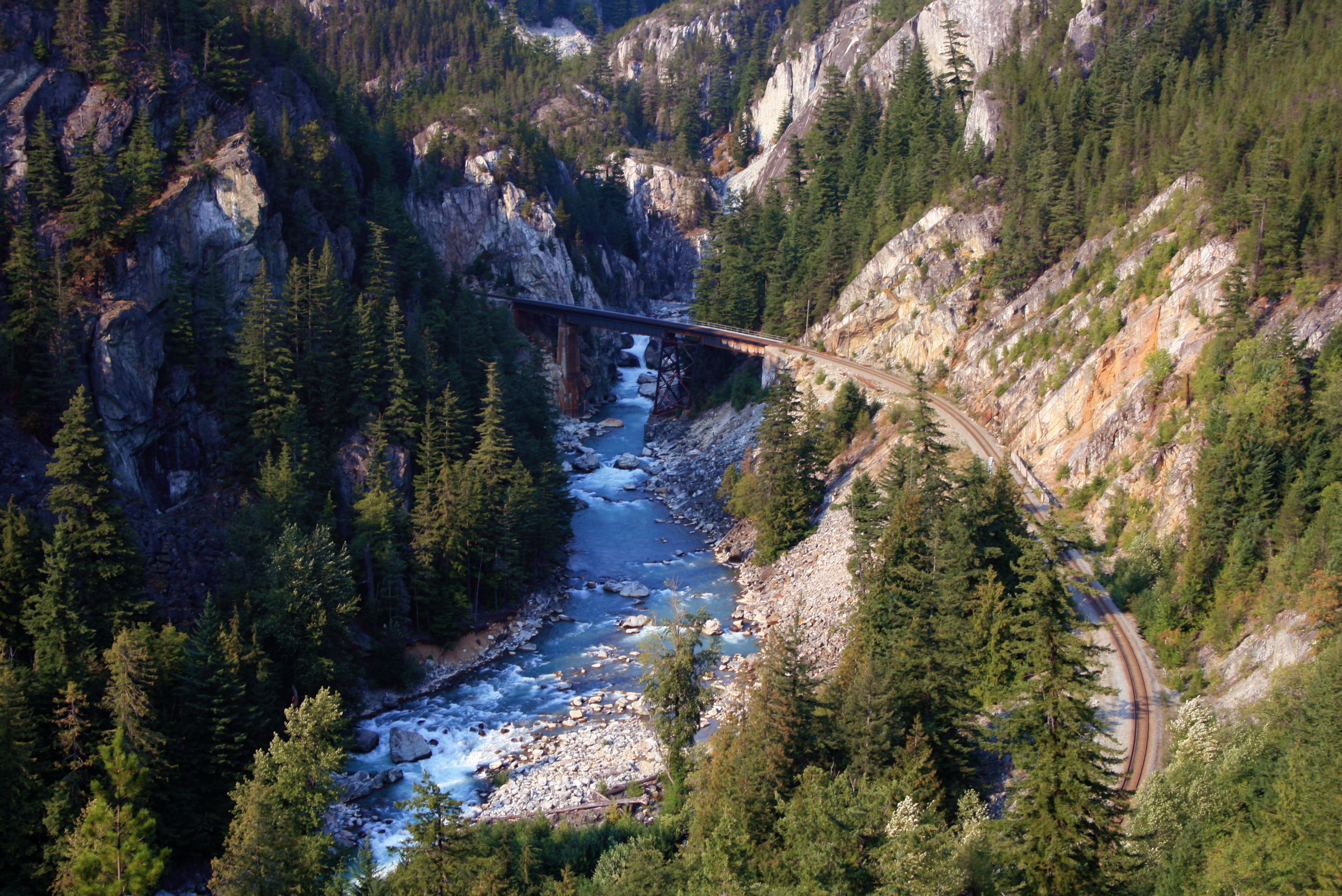
Aerial view of Cheakamus River and its canyon in 2009

The Cheakamus River derailment occurred on August 5, 2005, when nine cars that were from a Canadian National Railway freight train derailed and crashed into the Cheakamus River in British Columbia. One of the cars contained approximately 40,000 litres of caustic soda (sodium hydroxide), which entered the river, killing more than 500,000 fish from 10 different species, including chinook salmon, coho salmon, pink salmon, and rainbow trout, both freshwater and ocean-dwelling. Juvenile rainbow trout were the most affected at a mortality rate of 90% and it was also estimated that the adult chinook salmon mortality rate reached 50%.

On November 5, 2005, the federal transport minister, Jean Lapierre, ordered CN to limit the number of cars of its conventional trains travelling in the area of the derailment between Squamish and Clinton to 80 cars in response to the derailment; the train involved had 144 cars. In 2007, an investigation report from the Transportation Safety Board of Canada cited safety issues regarding operation of the train, such as not having the safest technology and improper training of the crew in how to respond to the various safety alarms. Additionally, they reported that the track had no contributing factors to the accident. The report said that the train was going uphill when nine cars fell from a bridge into the Cheakamus River. Transport Canada limited horsepower and tonnage after the accident, and CN faced federal and provincial charges. In 2006, it was estimated that it would take approximately a decade for the river to completely recover from the derailment. Attempts at restoration began by trying to introduce 20,000 juvenile steelhead salmon that would have been hatchery raised from 40 wild adult steelhead salmon. In 2010, CN pleaded guilty to one federal charge under the Federal Fisheries Act and had to pay $350,000 towards conservation efforts and an additional $400,000 as a penalty for pleading guilty to the charge.

The derailment cost CN at least $7 million.

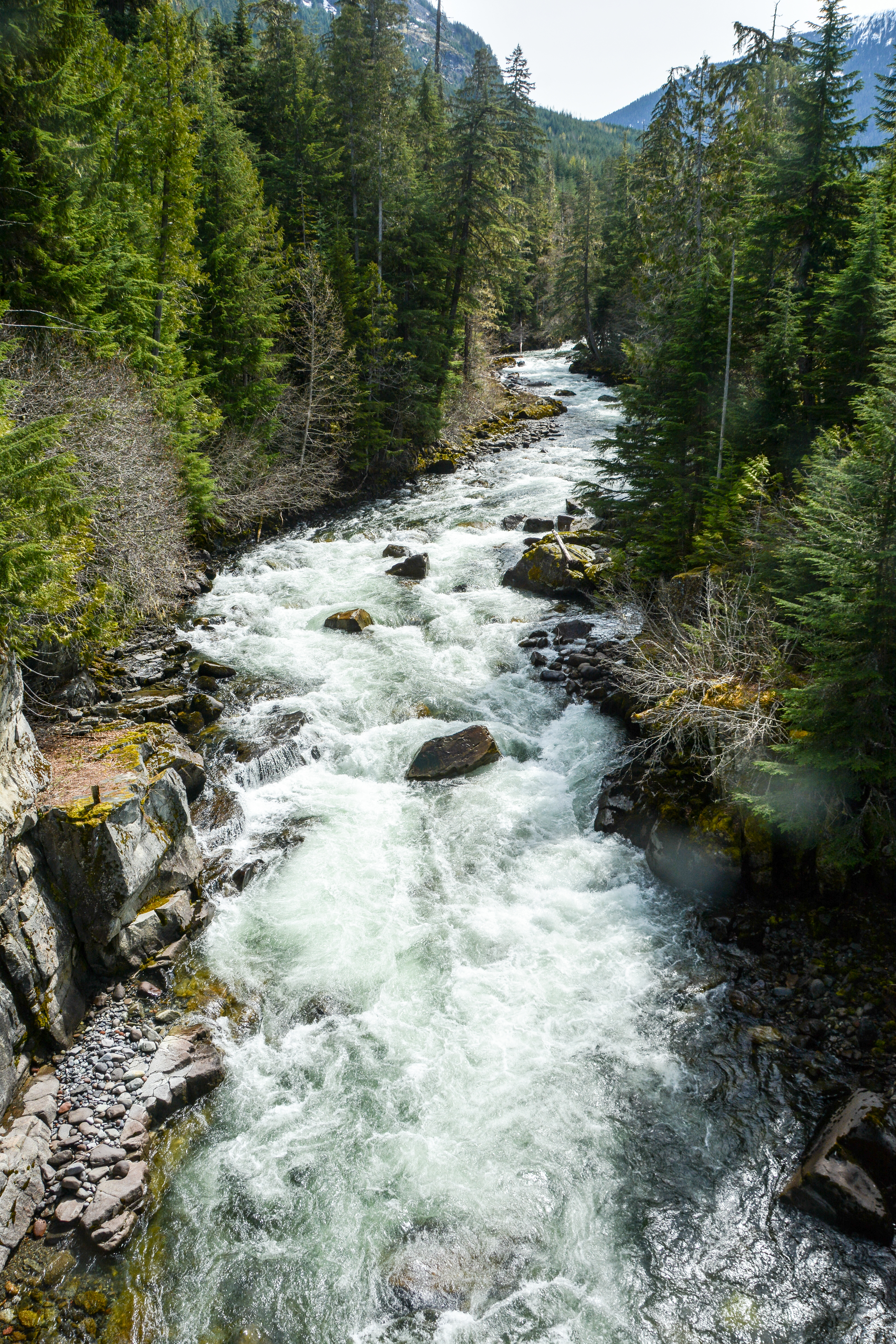
The Cheakamus River

== Sodium hydroxide effects in aquatic environments ==
Sodium hydroxide (NaOH) has the potential to be a dangerous chemical in aquatic environments due to it raising the pH level of the water. At low concentrations, NaOH will be neutralized by other chemicals in the water, such as acids and dissolved carbon dioxide (CO_{2}). Also, NaOH does not bioaccumulate in the aquatic organisms as it is dissolved in the water and has a negative octanol-water partition coefficient. The median lethal dose (LC_{50}) concentrations for aquatic organisms for NaOH range between 33 and 189 mg/L. The pH scale is a measure of the concentration of free hydrogen ions in the water. Extremely high pH will harm fish, specifically juveniles, by removing their slimy coats and drying out their skin, eyes and gills. Consequently, raising the pH of an aquatic environment can directly increase the toxicity of other chemicals, such as ammonia (NH_{3}). This is because in basic solutions (pH > 7), NH_{3} becomes more prevalent than ammonium (NH^{+}_{4}), and it is dangerous to aquatic life. When pH exceeds 9, NH_{3} concentrations are over 100 times higher than below pH of 9. Ultimately, high pH can lead to death of organisms in aquatic environments and directly reduce biodiversity in these environments. If not caused by man-made industries or accidents, high pH surges can occur naturally and may be observed when algal blooms occur, otherwise they are virtually impossible to observe without directly measuring the pH of the water.

== See also ==
- List of rail accidents in Canada
