= St. George bridge derailment =

Historical train accident

The St. George bridge derailment occurred on February 27, 1889 between 5:30 and 6:00 pm, just south of St. George, Ontario, Canada. The St. Louis Express was running east at about 45 mph (72 km/h; 20 m/s), and just before crossing the bridge a flange broke on a driving wheel, dislocating the coupling rod. The engine, tender and smoking car crossed safely, but the passenger car fell off the bridge, the dining car followed, and the Pullman remained standing on the bridge. Eleven people were killed and more than 30 were injured.

== Background ==
The St. Louis Express was one of the fast passenger trains on the Grand Trunk Railway, providing a regular service from Windsor to Toronto. The St. George bridge was located just south of the village of St. George, Ontario, crossing a tributary of the Fairchild creek at 43.233560, -80.248696 at a height of about 60 feet (18 m). Remnants of the concrete abutments can still be seen.

== Disaster ==
The St. Louis Express was headed east from Windsor to Toronto, due to pass through the station in St. George, Ontario at 6pm. The St. Louis Express had left Windsor at 1:40pm, and changed engines to No. 54 in London. The train left London at 4:30pm and after stopping in Paris was passing the St. George station and siding between 35 mph (56 km/h; 16 m/s) and 50 mph (80 km/h; 22 m/s). Midway between the two switches of the siding the engineer Wm Blackwell saw the tire thrown off the wheel on the right side of the engine. The coupling rod came off and the rails were spread, resulting in the locomotive and following cars running between the tracks and on the railway ties. The engineer could not apply the brakes or reverse the engine due to the bouncing of the locomotive cab.

The locomotive, tender and smoking car continued across the bridge. During the crossing the needle beams or ties were pushed together resulting in a large gap. The passenger car fell through the gap and possibly flipped at least once, landing right side up. The dining car followed but landed vertically with the forward end on the ground leaning up against a bridge pier. The Pullman car remained on the bridge.

The dining car had seven passengers plus cooks and waiters, who were thrown to the front of the car, along with the heavy cooking utensils and tables. The cooking range was fully running as the cooks were preparing dinner, and consequently fire broke out. The rescuers had to extinguish the fire before rescuing anyone.

The crash killed 11 people and more than 30 were injured.

=== Response ===
The residents of the village of St. George came out in full force to aid the wounded, led by a Dr. Kitchen. The local Mechanics' institute was used as a morgue, the Beemer's Hotel and Commercial Hotel and Dr. Kitchen's personal residence were used to tend to the wounded. The Expositor wrote "The people of St. George did noble, heroic work." The Spectator wrote "A noble array of heroic women turned out to minister to the dying and wounded." Angus McKay reported to the Legislative Assembly of Ontario that "the citizens of the village were indefatigable in their efforts to relieve the sufferings of the injured." Bonfires were lit in the snow to illuminate the wreckage.

A special train left from Hamilton with 13 doctors and a wrecking gang of 60 men to help.

=== Aftermath ===
The inquest's verdict was that the breaking of the tire was the cause of the accident. The railway company and employees were exonerated from all blame. The inquest did recommend all fast trains slow down while approaching the bridge.

=== Woodstock connection ===
A delegation from Woodstock, Ontario was headed to Toronto on the St. Louis Express, to attend the Private Bills Committee at the Legislative Assembly of Ontario on February 28, 1889, to represent Woodstock at the reading of the Electric Light Bill. Among the dead were A. W. Francis, editor of the Woodstock Times, Councillor Dr. L.H. Swan, and Councillor J. Peers. Councillor J. Martin succumbed to his injuries soon after. Major Dennis Karn was badly injured but made a full recovery after some time. The Electric Light Bill reading was postponed out of respect of the victims.

=== Related accident ===
Two people were killed in a railway accident in Paris, Ontario on March 1, 1889. The cause was attributed to the train routed over Brantford due to the bridge near St. George, Ontario being under repair, and the engineer was unfamiliar with the route from Brantford to Paris, especially the heavy grade just east of Paris Station. The freight train could not stop in time and ran through a stopped passenger car, killing two passengers.

== See also ==
- List of rail accidents in Canada
- List of Canadian disasters by death toll
