= St. George, Ontario =

Village in County of Brant, Ontario, Canada

Coordinates: 43.24580°N 80.25348°W

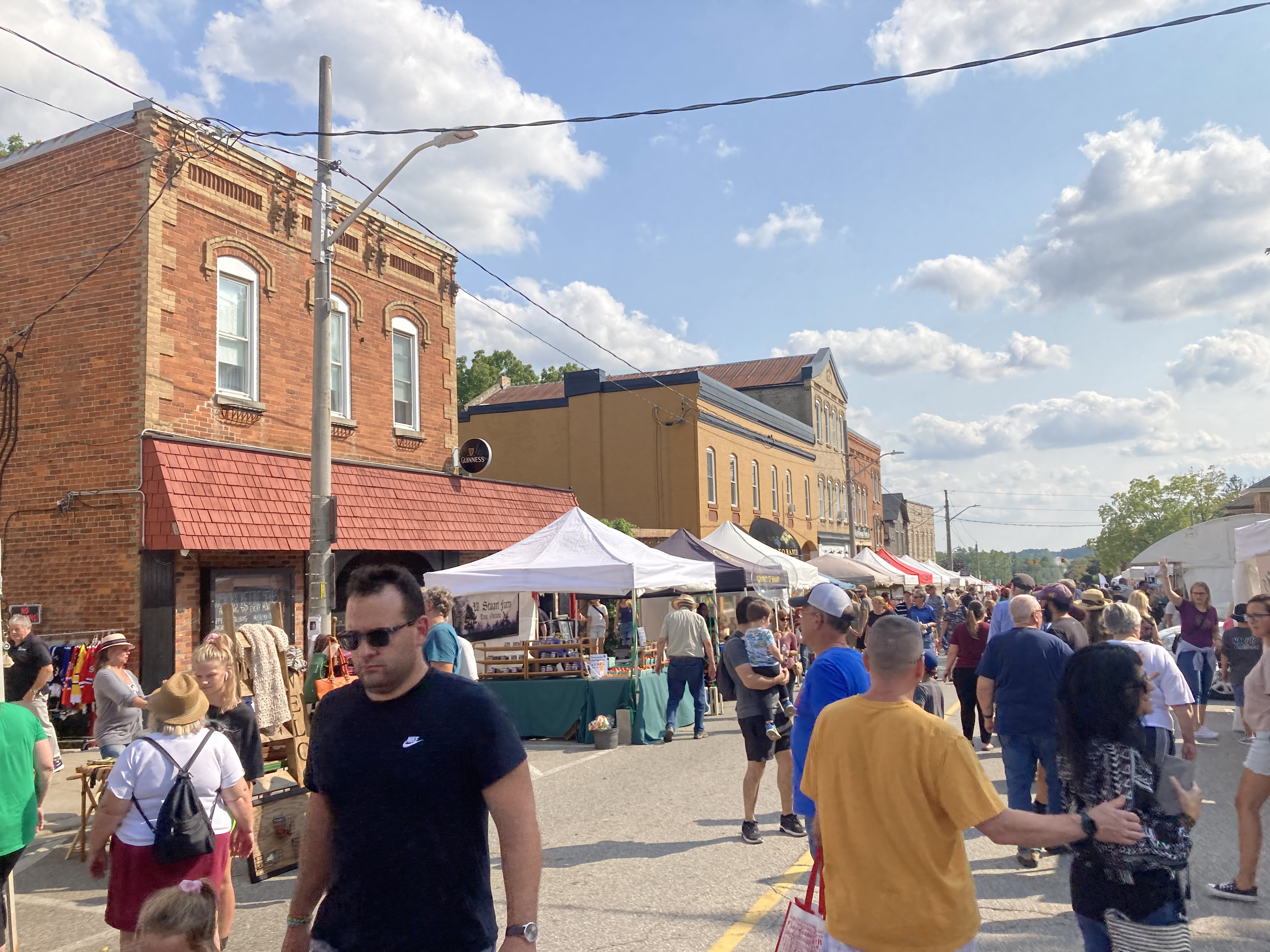
St. George during the 2022 Apple Festival

St. George is a small village located in and part of the municipality of County of Brant, between Cambridge and Brantford, in Southern Ontario, Canada. It had a population of 3,354 according to the 2021 Census.

The Apples Harvest Festival takes place during the third weekend in September and the town holds a Kinsmen Club of Brantford service club.

St. George is home to the St. George Ravens Jr. A Hockey Club. The team competes in the GMHL South Division. The Ravens were relocated to St George from Burlington, Ontario, in 2016. The Ravens play out of South Dumfries Community Centre.

St. George is known for its numerous antique stores on Main Street.

The municipal offices of the former Township of South Dumfries, an old Victorian mansion known as Sunnyside, have been the home of current County of Brant mayor David Bailey, since 2000.

== Notable people ==
- Harry Nixon (1891-1961) -- 13th premier of Ontario

== See also ==
- St. George bridge derailment
