= Dugald rail accident =

1947 head-on collision and subsequent fire in Manitoba, Canada

Coordinates: 49.8856°N 96.8392°W

Dugald Rail Disaster

Details
- Date: September 1, 1947; 9:44 p.m.
- Location: Dugald, Manitoba
- Country: Canada
- Line: Transcontinental mainline
- Operator: Canadian National Railways
- Incident type: Head-on collision
- Cause: Disregard of train orders

Statistics
- Trains: 2
- Deaths: 31
- Injured: 85

The Dugald rail accident was a head-on collision between two Canadian National passenger trains on September 1, 1947, in Dugald, Manitoba, Canada, resulting in the deaths of 31 people.

== Background ==
A westbound Canadian National Railways (CN) train, the Minaki Campers’ Special, operating as Passenger Extra 6001 West, was a seasonal excursion service carrying vacationers from the Minaki region of Northwestern Ontario on the Monday evening of the Labour Day holiday weekend. It had been given orders at Malachi, Ontario, 100 miles (160 km) east of Winnipeg, to meet train No. 4, the eastbound Continental Limited, at Vivian. These orders were later changed, so the meeting point was relocated 16 miles (26 km) westward for a meet at Dugald, 14 miles (23 km) east of Winnipeg. These second orders had been received at Elma, Manitoba. The eastbound train was led by a CN U-1-d-class 4-8-2 steam locomotive numbered 6046.

== Collision and fire ==
By the train order operation rules then in use, Extra 6001 would use the siding at the east switch of Dugald. By the air signal line, the train conductor reminded the engineer of the Dugald stop one or two miles beforehand and received the proper acknowledgement. However, Extra 6001 failed to enter the siding at the east switch and collided head-on with the stationary eastbound train No. 4 at 9:44 p.m. at approximately 30 miles per hour (48 km/h).

Extra 6001 comprised U-1-a class 4-8-2 steam locomotive 6001, two steel baggage cars, nine wooden gas-illuminated coaches, and two steel parlour cars. After the collision, the wooden carriages of the vacation train caught fire. Strict steel rationing during World War II resulted in old wooden cars being kept in service until newer cars could be purchased. The collision began a series of events that caused fires fuelled by compressed gas from broken lines and tanks on the wooden coaches that gutted the wooden cars and set fire to oil tanks near the tracks. Except for the engineer and fireman of Extra 6001, who died in the initial collision, the fire caused the fatalities of this incident. No fatalities occurred in the vacation train's two rear cars or on the Continental Limited. Both of the locomotives involved were rebuilt and repaired by CN after the wreck.

== Inquiry ==
An inquiry blamed the crew of the vacationers' train for failing to obey orders. The investigation also determined that the crew's error had been precipitated by their seeing a "clear" signal, which implied that the track ahead was clear, and that the Continental Limited's dimming of its headlamp while waiting in the station lessened its visibility to the oncoming vacation train. This resulted in the acquisition of modern rail cars and improved rules regarding operations on the line.

== In popular culture ==
- "The Minaki Train Crash" is an episode about the Dugald rail accident from the documentary Disasters of the Century (2000), aired on the Canadian network History.

== See also ==
- List of rail accidents in Canada
- List of rail accidents (1940–1949)
- 1947 in Canada
