= Metishto River =

River in Manitoba, Canada

Mouth of the Metishto River. Headwaters are at 54.3297°N 100.1393°W

The Metishto River (also spelled Mitishto River) is a tributary of the Grass River which is, in turn, a tributary of the Nelson River that ultimately flows into Hudson Bay. Its headwaters lie "a short distance from the northwest arm of Moose Lake".

The river meanders roughly parallel to the railway line from The Pas to Churchill for much of its length.

In September 2018 a train operated by the Arctic Gateway Group derailed while crossing a freshet emptying into the river near Ponton, Manitoba. Immediately after the derailment, it was thought that the crash leaked "liquid petroleum" into the accident site, delaying the efforts of the first responders. However, the Transportation Safety Board of Canada's final report on the incident stated that only diesel fuel had leaked.
