= Aldershot, Burlington =

Aldershot
- Unincorporated community
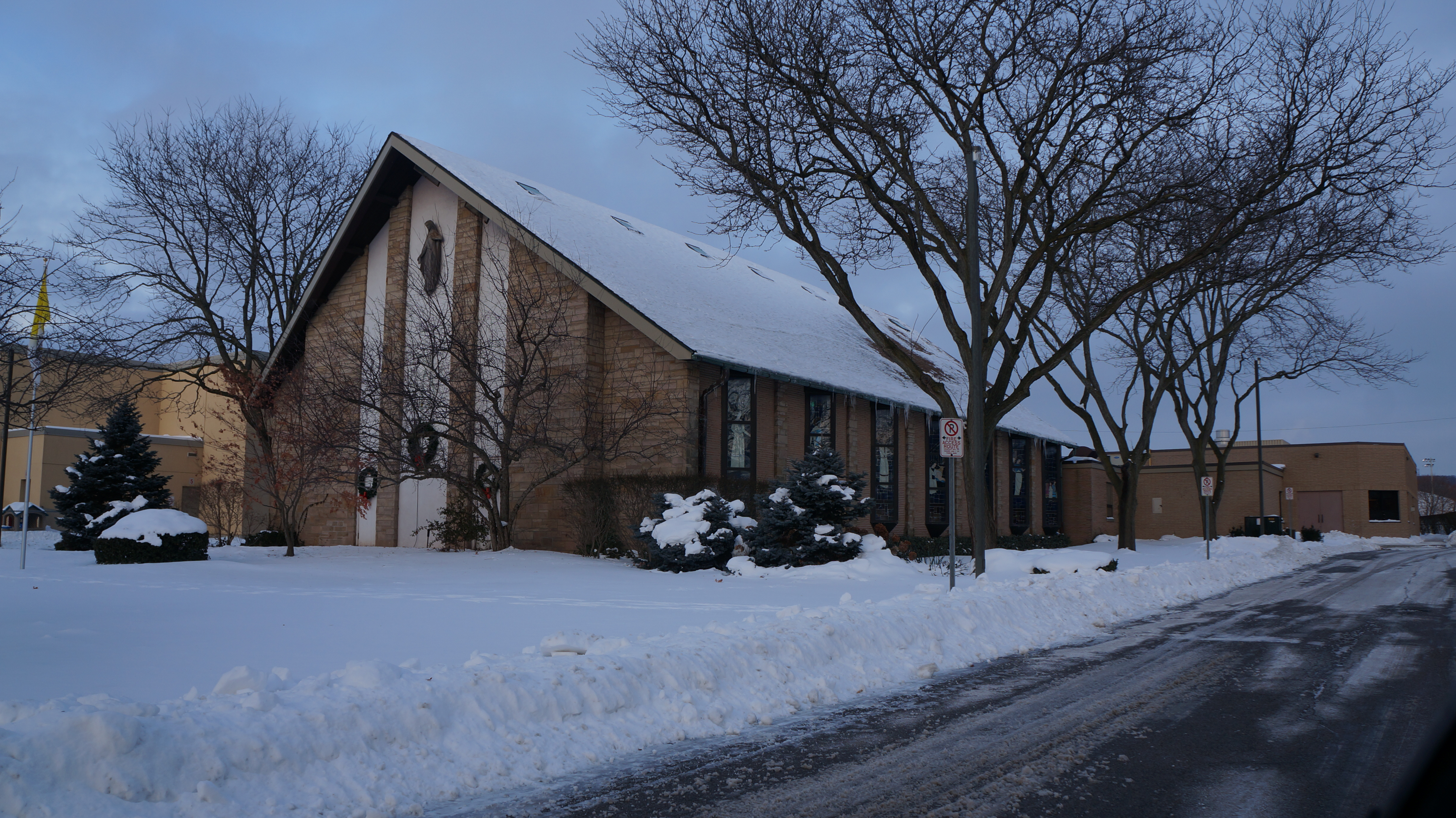
- Holy Rosary Church

- Location of Aldershot Aldershot (Southern Ontario)
- Coordinates: 43°18′32″N 79°50′28″W
- Country: Canada
- Province: Ontario
- Regional municipality: Halton
- City: Burlington
- Settled: 1790s

Government
  - Type: Municipal
  - Councillor: Kelvin Galbraith
- Time zone: UTC−5 (EST)
  - Summer (DST): UTC−4 (EDT)
- Forward sortation area: L7L, L7M, L7N, L7P, L7T
- Area codes: 905 and 289
- NTS Map: 30M5 Burlington
- GNBC Code: FACFL

Aldershot is a community in Burlington, Ontario, Canada. Located on the shore of Burlington Bay of Lake Ontario, it is a former unincorporated village that was previously a part of East Flamborough Township until it was annexed by the city of Burlington in 1958.

== Transport ==
Via Rail and GO Transit operate Aldershot railway station, on the Quebec City–Windsor Corridor and Lakeshore West lines respectively, which serves the immediate area and the adjacent city of Hamilton.

== See also ==
- Aldershot High School
- List of unincorporated communities in Ontario
