= Borgaon (disambiguation) =

Borgaon may refer to:

- Borgaon, a village in Solapur district, Maharashtra, India
- Borgaon Dam
- Borgaon Manju, a town in Akola district, Maharashtra, India
- Borgaon, a town in Wardha district, Maharashtra, India
- Bhogaon, a major village in Jintur taluka of Parbhani district in Maharashtra, India
- Bhogaon, a town and a nagar panchayat in Mainpuri district in the state of Uttar Pradesh, India.
