= List of rail accidents (1910–1919) =

This is a list of rail accidents from 1910 to 1919.

== 1910 ==
- January 1 - United Kingdom - Braunton Road rail accident, In Devon, United Kingdom, 1 person was killed after being hit by a railroad crossing gate and a train.
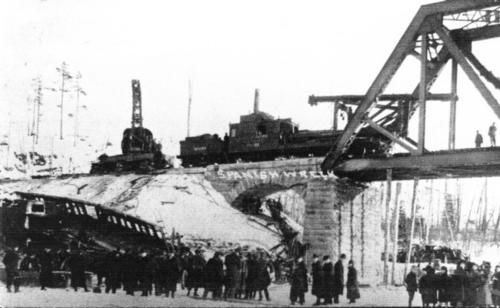
- Spanish River derailment
  January 21 – Canada – Spanish River derailment Northern Ontario: Canadian Pacific Railway's westbound Soo Express derailed while crossing the bridge at the Spanish River killing 44 people and injuring many more.
- January 29 – United Kingdom – A London, Brighton and South Coast Railway express train derailed at Stoats Nest, London due to a faulty wheelset on one of the carriages. Seven people were killed and 65 injured.
- February 14 – United States – Near Elkton, Kentucky, the engine and two cars of Elkton & Guthrie Railroad passenger train No. 84 derailed killing the engineer and fireman.
- March 1 – United States – The Wellington, Washington avalanche: in Wellington, near the Cascade Tunnel, Washington, approximately 100 were killed when a snow avalanche pushed two trains off a cliff. The trains were stopped at a mountain depot; the passenger train was halted by an avalanche ahead of it, and then trapped by an avalanche behind it. Passengers and rail employees mostly stayed on board the stopped trains, which were subsequently struck squarely by another avalanche.
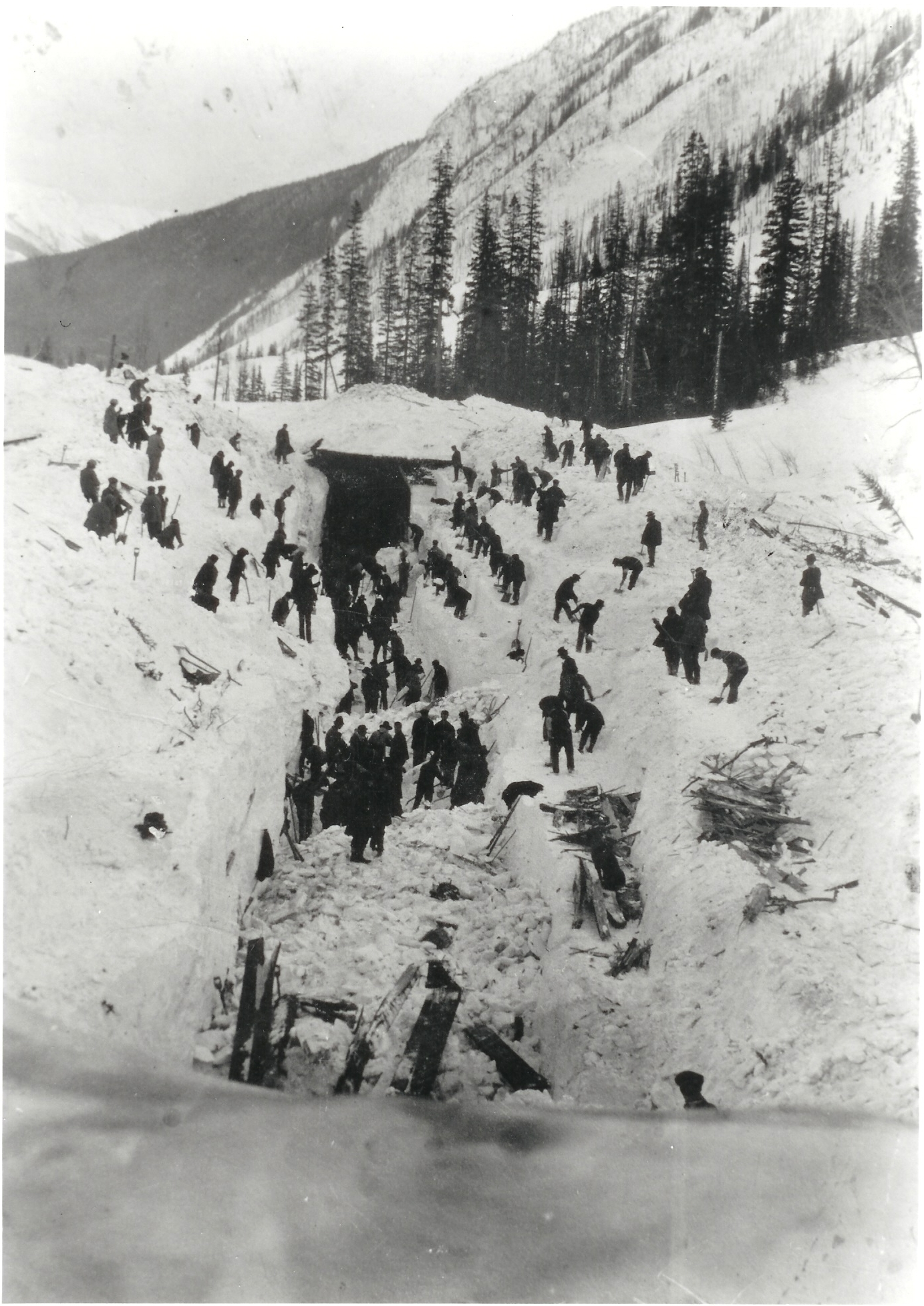
- 1910 Rogers Pass avalanche
  March 4 – Canada – 1910 Rogers Pass avalanche British Columbia: An avalanche killed 62 men clearing the snow of a preceding avalanche from the Canadian Pacific Railway's transcontinental railway, near the summit of Rogers Pass through the Selkirk Mountains.
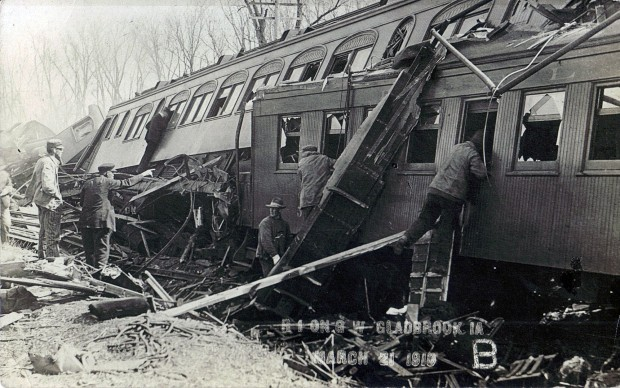
- Green Mountain train wreck
  March 21 – United States – Green Mountain train wreck, Iowa: A Rock Island Railroad passenger train derailed, killing 52 passengers and severely injuring scores of others.
- March 30 – Germany – The luxury Lloyd Express from Hamburg to Genoa, overran signals at Mülheim an der Ruhr due to the driver's error and collided with a troop train going to Metz (now in France); 20 were killed and 41 seriously injured.
- June 9 – Canada – A freight train derailed near Marathon, Ontario killing three people. The locomotive and boxcars plunged into Lake Superior, sinking in 235 feet (72 m) of water. They were discovered in 2016 and 2014 respectively.
- June 18 – France – On the Chemins de fer de l'État, a local train from Paris stopped at Villepreux – Les Clayes station due to engine trouble—fortunately, with many of the passengers waiting on the platform—when an express for Granville overran signals and crashed into it at about 60 mph (100 km/h); at least 18 people were killed and 90 injured. The driver of the express was chased from the scene by an angry crowd and later arrested.
- June 23 – Mexico – On the Manzanillo line, the rear four cars of a troop train broke free and ran away backwards; 37 people were killed and 50 injured.
- July 4 – United States – Due to an accident at Sharonville, Ohio, the New York Central Railroad's westbound 20th Century Limited was diverted onto the Cincinnati, Hamilton and Dayton Railway. Due to an error in transmitting train orders, the train collided head-on with an eastbound freight at Middletown, Ohio killing 20.
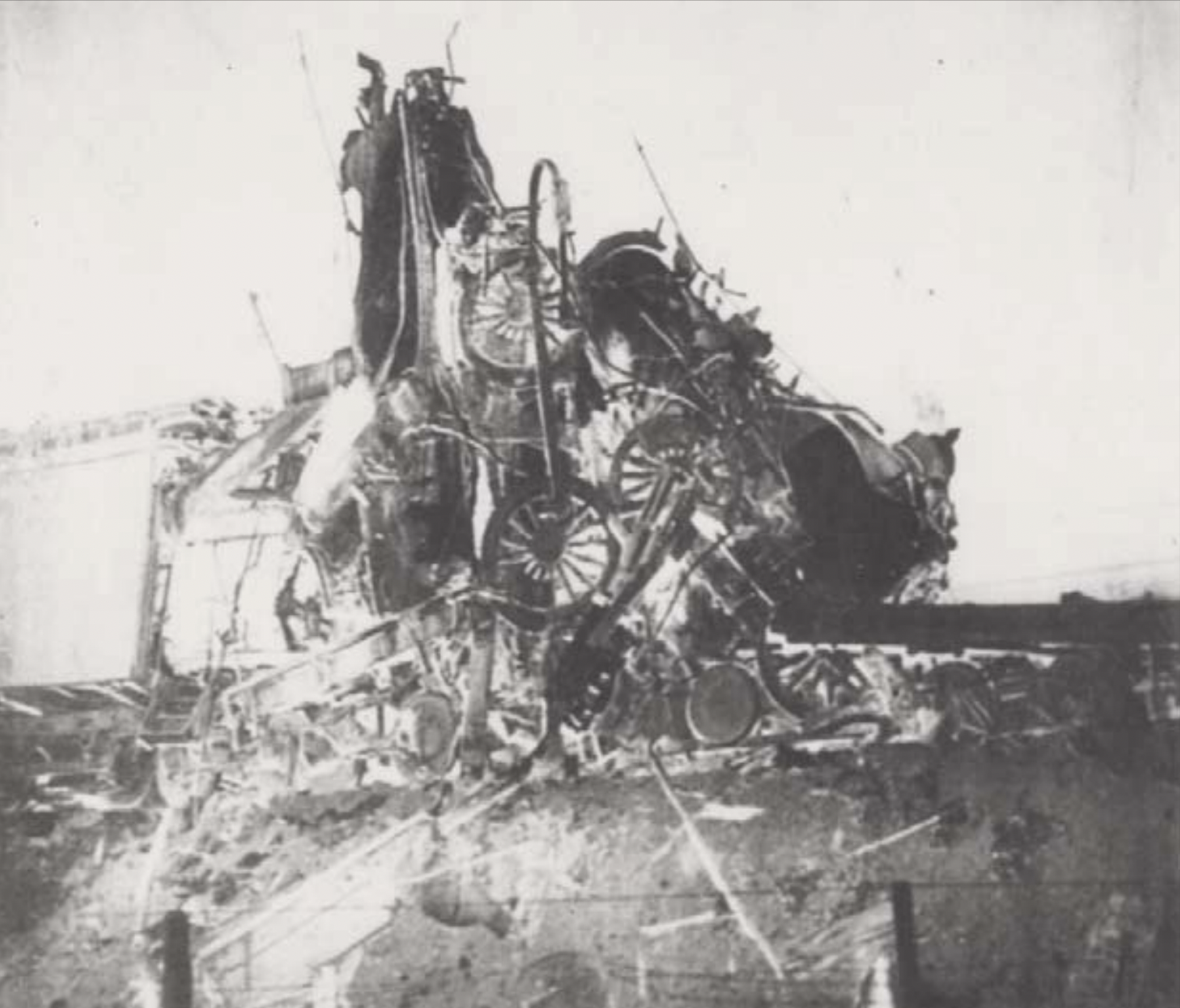
- The aftermath of the 1910 Ignacio rail accident
  August 8 – United States – 1910 Ignacio Rail Accident: A regularly scheduled San Francisco and North Pacific passenger train collided with an extra train not listed on the timetable in Novato, California. up to 16 were killed and up to 30 were injured.
- August 14 – France – At Saujon on the Paris-Orléans Railway, an excursion train from Bordeaux collided with a freight train; 43 people were killed and 50 injured, most of them young girls.
- August 15 – United States – Two trolley cars of the Gettysburg Electric Railway collided near Devil's Den, ejecting people onto rocks, resulting in one fatality. A similar collision occurred during the 1913 Gettysburg reunion, and trolley incidents on the Gettysburg Battlefield included failed tracks, sabotage, and lightning strikes.
- September 21 – United States – A southbound interurban car on the Fort Wayne and Wabash Valley was driven past the point where it should have waited for an empty northbound car. The two trains collided killing 34.
- October 4 – United States – Due to a heavy passenger load for the Veiled Prophets parade at St. Louis, a southbound interurban train on the Illinois Traction System was operated in two sections. The motorman of a northbound train that was supposed to wait for it at Staunton, Illinois, failed to understand this and collided with the second section in the worst accident ever to an interurban in the U.S; 36 were killed.
- November 15 – United Kingdom – An express freight train overran signals and crashed into the rear of another freight train at Darlington, County Durham. The driver may have fallen asleep at the controls.
- December 6 – United Kingdom – A London and North Western Railway passenger train ran into the rear of another at Willesden Junction, Middlesex killing three and injuring more than 40.
- December 24 – United Kingdom – Hawes Junction rail crash, Cumbria, England: A busy signalman forgot about a pair of light engines on the main line and allowed an express train to follow them into the same section, causing a collision which killed 12.
- December 24 – United Kingdom – At Bolsover, England, a group of children got onto a level crossing through an open wicket gate and were struck by a train; three were killed and three injured.
- December 24 – United States – Eight people died in a collision at Upper Sandusky, Ohio.
- December 24 – France – At Montereau on the PLM railway, an express from Paris to Modane collided with a freight train, killing one crew member and injuring seven passengers.

== 1911 ==
- January 23 – United Kingdom – Pontypridd railway accident. A collision between a passenger train and coal train on the Taff Vale Railway at Hopkinstown killed eleven and seriously injured four.
- April 22 – South Africa – Blaauwkrantz Bridge disaster - A mixed train on the Kowie Railway, running from Port Alfred to Grahamstown, derailed on the approach to the Blaauwkrants (now Bloukrans) Bridge, probably due to a wheel defect on a freight car. Four passenger cars fell into a ravine 250 feet (76 m) deep killing thirty people.
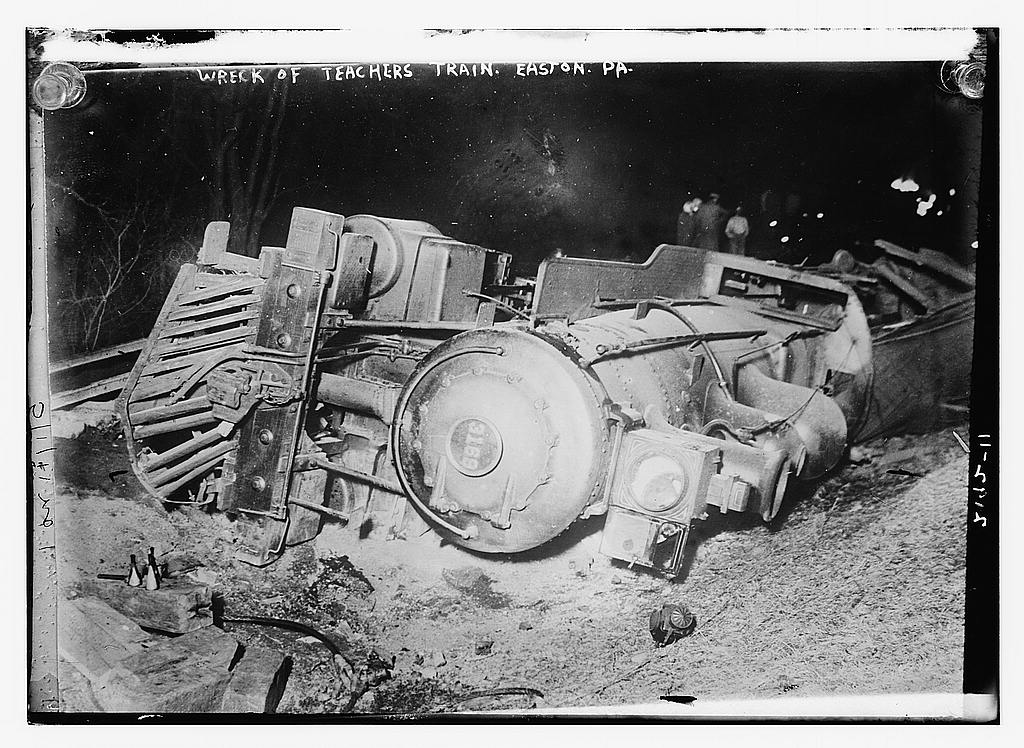
- Train wreck on April 29, 1911, in Martin's Creek, New Jersey
  April 29 – United States – Martin's Creek, New Jersey. A train, carrying 169 school teachers, friends, and relatives, bound from Utica, Syracuse, and Waterville in New York state to Washington, DC, was hurled down a forty-foot (12 m) embankment at Martin's Creek.
- May 29 – United States – Indianola train wreck. A collision between two passenger trains at Indianola, Nebraska killed 18 and injured 32.
- July 11 – United States – outside of Bridgeport, Connecticut: The Federal Express, carrying the St. Louis Cardinals baseball team on a trip from Philadelphia to Boston, plunged down an 18-foot (5.5 m) embankment, killing 14 passengers. No one from the team was killed.
- July 21 – United States – Ridgewood, New Jersey. Two interurban cars of the North Jersey Rapid Transit Company collided head-on due to faulty signals, killing 3 crew and injuring 16 passengers.
- August 13 – United States – Fort Wayne, Indiana: The Pennsylvania Railroad's Penn Flyer derailed at Fort Wayne. Almost immediately, the derailed equipment was struck by an oncoming freight train, killing four and injuring 57.
- August 25 – United States – Lehigh Valley train wreck – A broken rail on a bridge in Rochester, New York resulted in two passenger cars falling over the side killing 28 passengers; a majority of them were Civil War veterans.
- October – United States – Hampstead, New Hampshire: two freight trains collided head-on, killing engineer Allen Bradley
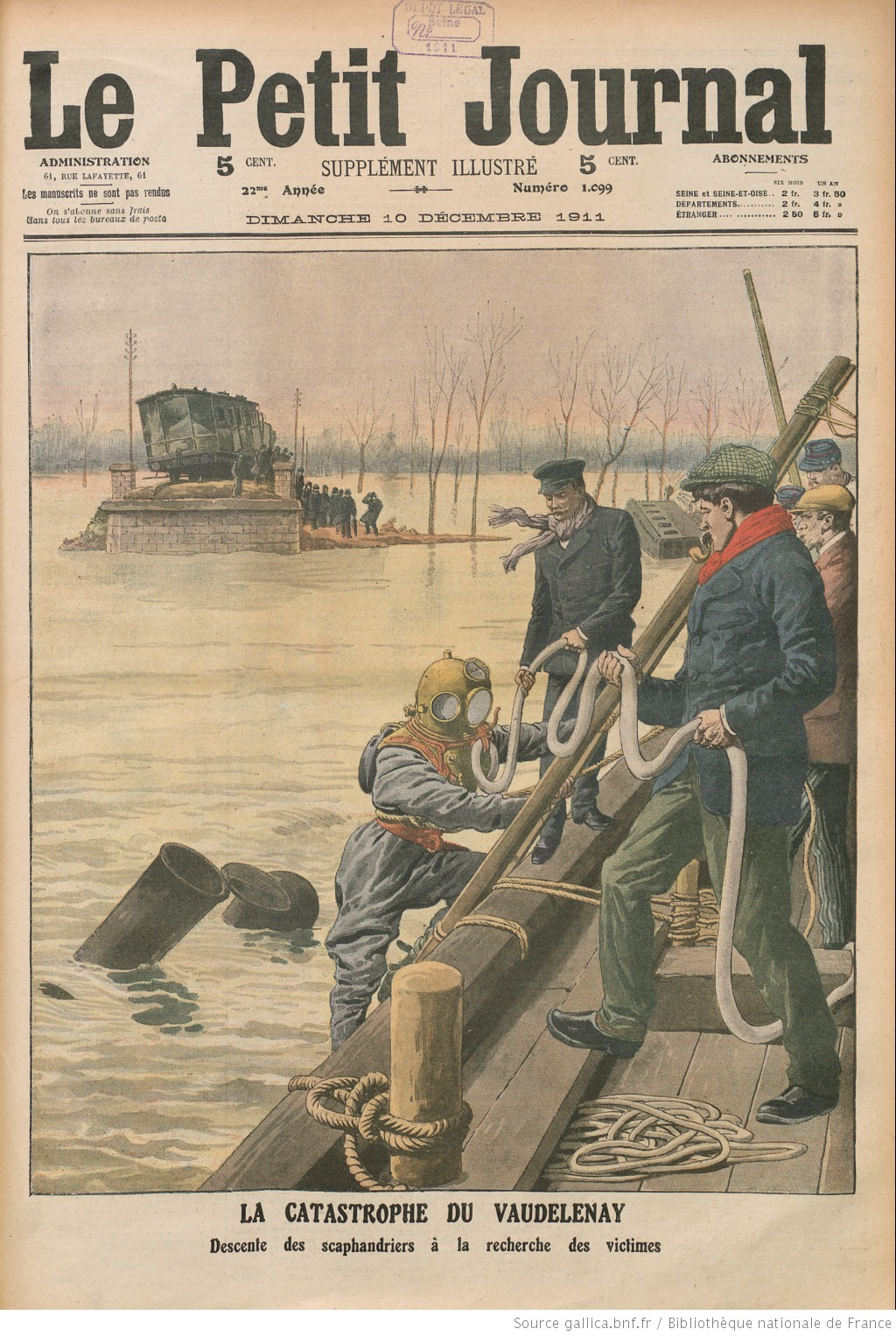
- Petit Journal issue of 5 December 1911 reporting the 23 November 1911 Montreuil-Bellay railway accident
  November 23 – France – A bridge collapsed under a passenger train at Montreuil-Bellay, killing 22 people.
- December 13 – United Kingdom – A freight train ran away near Wombwell, Yorkshire and crashed into wagons being shunted at Darfield Main killing two.
- December 15 – United Kingdom – A freight train derailed near Lartington Quarry, County Durham when the driver stopped too severely. During recovery operations, a steam crane overturned.

== 1912 ==
- January 11 – United States – Hempstead, New York – A milk train runs into the back of a stationary passenger car at Hempstead (LIRR station) sending it past the end of the line, across Fulton Avenue into the O. L. Schwenke Land & Investment Company Building. One operator and one conductor were killed.
- January 16 – United States – Chunky, Mississippi – Alabama & Vicksburg Railway passenger train no. 1 crashes in a creek. One person is killed with a few injured. 80 passengers were on board the westbound train.
- March 7 – United States –Nottingham, Ohio – The New York Central's Twentieth Century Limited, bound for Chicago, derailed at 2:05 a.m. No passengers were killed. A sleeping car crushed a shanty where a switchman was sleeping, killing him.
- March 8 – United States –West Lebanon, Indiana – The Wabash Railroad's Continental Limited, en route from Buffalo to St. Louis, derailed at Redwood Creek, two miles west of West Lebanon. All eight cars derailed and fell thirty feet into a ditch. Four were killed and sixty hurt.
- March 18 – United States – San Antonio, Texas – A Galveston, Harrisburg and San Antonio Railroad locomotive, Number 704, suffers a boiler explosion at the Southern Pacific roundhouse, killing 36 to 41 people and injuring another 50 in the deadliest locomotive explosion in United States history. The locomotive had been damaged in an incident at Seguin on December 18, 1911, and was being returned to service following repairs when the explosion occurred.
- March 23 – Canada – At a location named Birch on the Lake Superior Division of the Canadian Pacific Railway, eastbound and westbound freight trains collide. The eastbound train passed Birch instead of waiting there for the train meet. According to the article, two train crew members died, another was missing and two others were seriously injured.
- March 31 – United States – Hyde Park, New York – The New York Central's eastbound Twentieth Century Limited derailed 1 1/4 miles south of Hyde Park at 8:53 a.m., injuring 51 passengers and 17 crew.
- June 21 – United Kingdom – A Lancashire and Yorkshire Railway passenger train derails on the Charlestown Curve, Yorkshire killing four people and seriously injuring eleven.
- Corning N.Y. train wreck July 4, 1912
  July 4 – United States – Corning train wreck: A Delaware, Lackawanna and Western Railroad express train crashes into the rear of a stalled excursion train near Corning on Independence Day, killing 39.
- July 5 – United States – On the Ligonier Valley Railroad, a train order was issued for an excursion train making the 1.5-mile (2.4 km) trip from Ligonier, Pennsylvania to a fairground to wait for a coal train going the other way. The excursion train consisted of a single car being pushed from behind. It proceedes against the order and collides with the coal train, crushing the car between the two locomotives. 19 passengers and 3 crewmen were killed
- August 29 – United Kingdom – a light engine collides with a rake of nine carriages at Vauxhall. One passenger is killed and 43 injured.
- September 17 – United Kingdom – Ditton Junction rail crash: A driver misreads signals resulting in 15 deaths.
- November 27 – United States – A Pennsylvania Railroad express train crashes at Glen Loch, Pennsylvania killing four and injuring more than two dozen.

== 1913 ==
- January 1 – United States – Guyandotte River bridge accident: A too heavy locomotive crossed onto the Guyandotte River bridge, which was being repaired causing the bridge to collapse, killing an engineer and six workmen.
- January 2 – United States – A horse and buggy with a family of four is struck by a Rock Island Railroad train at a grade crossing two miles (3.2 km) north of Belleville, Kansas. The wife and 2 children were killed and the husband dies of injuries.
- March 3 – United Kingdom – A North Eastern Railway passenger train collided with the rear end of an electric multiple unit at Manors station, Newcastle upon Tyne due to a signalman's error injuring forty-nine people.
- March 11 – United Kingdom – A South Eastern and Chatham Railway passenger train overran buffers at Ramsgate Town, Kent due to an error in connecting the train's brakes injuring ten people.
- April 30 – British India – At Borgaon Manju, a local train from Bhusawal, Bombay Province, to Nagpur, Central Provinces, crashed at 30 mph (50 km/h) into the rear of a stationary goods train. The first six-passenger cars were destroyed and at least forty people were killed and many injured.
- May 11 – Bulgaria – At Drama, the rear 25 cars of a military train broke free and rolled back towards Buk. The runaway cars crashed into a 28-car train also full of soldiers, killing 150 people and injuring 200.
- June 25 – Canada – A train heavily loaded with immigrants derailed near Ottawa killing eight and injuring approximately 50.
- July 12 – United Kingdom – A Great Eastern Railway express train ran into the rear of a light engine at Colchester, Essex due to a signalman's error, killing three people and injuring fourteen.
- July 26 – Denmark – Bramminge train accident: A train derailed near Bramming, due to heat-stressed rails, killing fifteen and injuring about 80.
- August 8 – United Kingdom – A Great Western Railway locomotive overran signals at Yeovil Pen Mill, Somerset and collided with a passenger train killing two.
- September 1 – United States– New Haven, Connecticut. A train wreck killed 21.
- September 2 – United Kingdom – Ais Gill rail crash, Cumbria, England: A distracted engine crew passed signals at danger, and crashed into a train stalled on gradient killing fourteen and seriously injuring 38.
- September 2 – United States – Due to heavy holiday weekend traffic on the New Haven Railroad, the westbound Bar Harbor Express and White Mountain Express were each running in two sections. A local train ahead of all four expresses stopped at Wallingford, Connecticut, delaying the expresses, but the overtired engineer of the third express missed his signal and crashed into the one ahead killing 26.
- September – France – A 3-car electric train derailed on a viaduct at Villeneuve-Loubet and at least one car crashed into the ravine, killing 20 people and injuring 40. News reports blame "the imperfect working of the magnetic brake because of a storm", though this seems to make no sense.
- October 19 – United States – A Mobile and Ohio Railroad troop train derailed at Buckatunna, Mississippi, (near Mobile, Alabama) killing at least 20 members of the U. S. Army stationed at Fort Morgan (Alabama).
- October 22 – Canada – A Canadian Pacific Railway work train and an eastbound freight train collided near Wayland, west of Chapleau, Ontario on CP's Lake Superior Division killing five crew members and injuring seven.
- October 25 – United Kingdom – Two South Eastern & Chatham Railway passenger trains collided at Waterloo Junction, London killing three.
- United Kingdom – a Great Central Railway freight train derailed at Torside, Derbyshire after the crew of the locomotive was overcome by fumes in the Woodhead Tunnel.
- November 4 – France – On the PLM Railway, the driver of a southbound mail train from Paris missed seeing two signals. At Melun, the train entered a side track by crossing over the northbound main line, and collided with a northbound express from Marseille killing 39, including 15 postal workers.
- December 6 – Romania – One hundred people are killed by a collision at Costești.

== 1914 ==
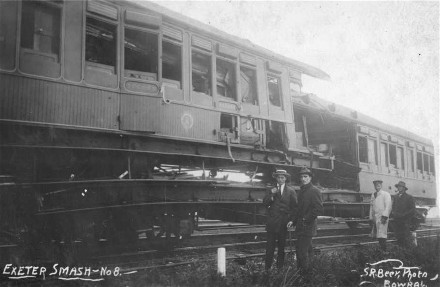
- Exeter crossing loop collision
  March 13 – Australia – Exeter crossing loop collision, New South Wales. A freight train entering the Exeter station collided head-on with a mail train being removed from the track in anticipation of the arrival of the freight train. Fourteen people were killed in the accident.
- April 2 – Dutch East Indies (now Indonesia) – At Tanjong-Prioh, a passenger train is derailed by a buffalo on the track; it damages a bridge, which collapses, and the locomotive and first 5 cars go into the river, killing 20 people and injuring 50. The European passengers on the train are all in the rear cars and are unhurt.
- April 14 – United Kingdom – A North British Railway express passenger train collides with a freight train at Burntisland, Fife due to a signalman's error.
- April 24 – United States – A Missouri, Kansas & Texas Railroad freight train derails near Chetopa, Kansas.
- June 17 – United Kingdom – An excursion train departs from Reading station, Berkshire against signals. An express passenger train is in a sidelong collision with it, killing one person.
- June 18 – United Kingdom – Baddengorm Burn, Carr Bridge, Scotland: Cloudburst washed away the foundations of a bridge, which collapsed as a passenger train crossed it. The train split in two, with one coach falling into the burn, drowning 5 people.
- June 27 – United Kingdom – A South Eastern and Chatham Railway passenger train departs from Cannon Street station, London against a danger signal and collides with another train. One person is killed.
- August 5 – United States – At Tipton Ford, Missouri, on the Kansas City Southern Railway, a train order is issued for a northbound Missouri and North Arkansas Railroad gasoline motor car to stop and wait for a southbound KCS passenger train. The motor car proceeds and collides head-on with the train at a combined speed of 70 mph (110 km/h), and is enveloped in flames from the gasoline. There are 38 passengers and 5 employees killed, many burnt beyond recognition, and 34 passengers and 4 employees are injured.
- September 18 – United States – Lebanon, Missouri: A train on the St. Louis–San Francisco Railway is derailed by a washout, killing 27 people.
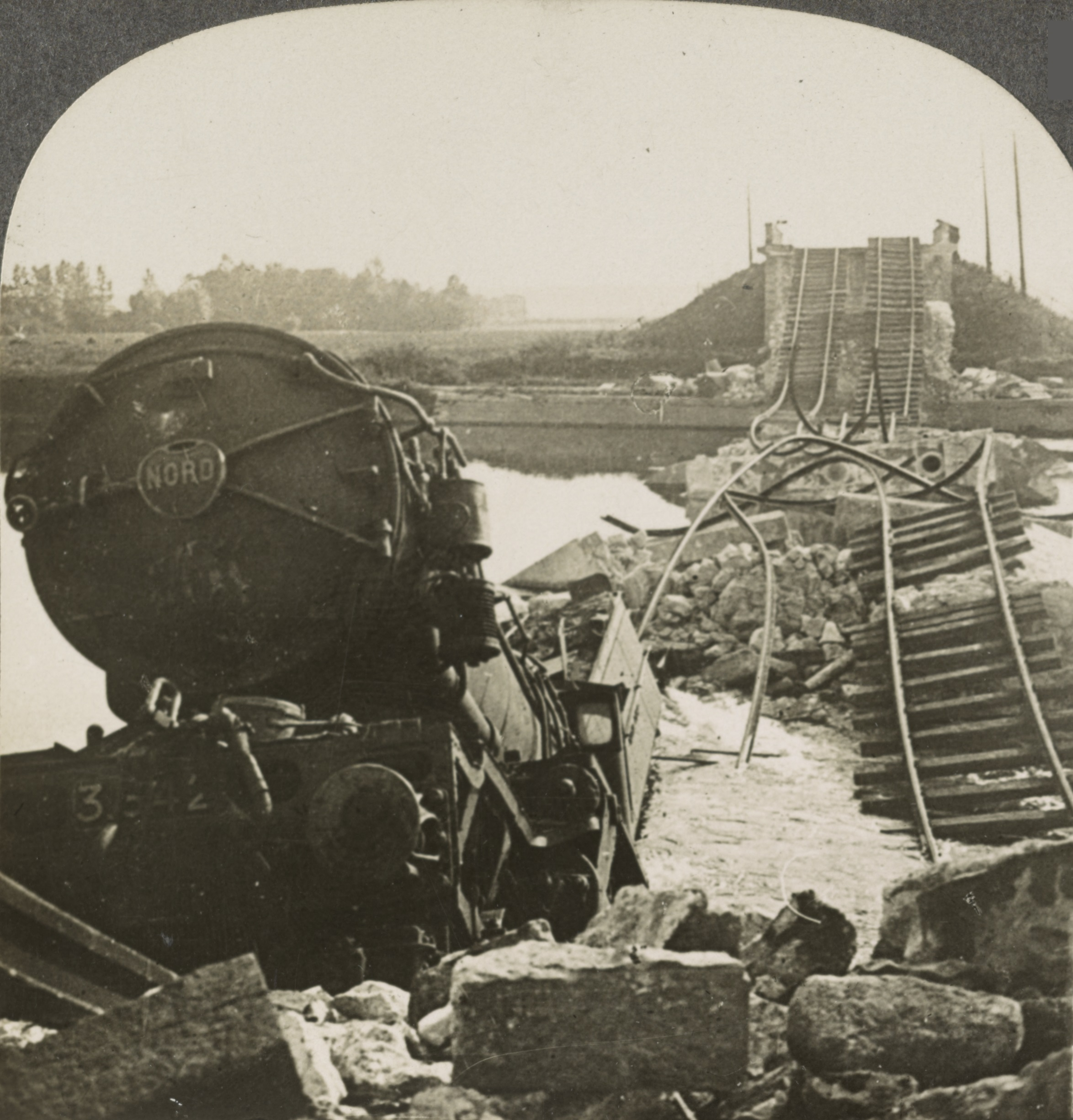
- Tangled ruins of the Mary Bridge over the Marne river after it was blown up by Germans and a Red Cross train crashed into the river in October 1914
  October - Many British and French wounded when a Red Cross train crashes into Marne River after Imperial Germans destroy the Mary Bridge.
- December – Austria-Hungary – At Kalush (now in Ukraine), two Austrian troop trains collide, one carrying troops from Prussia and the other carrying wounded officers from the Eastern Front, after a switch is thrown at the last moment. More than 20 cars are smashed, about 400 people killed and 500 injured. Several railwaymen are arrested for treason.

== 1915 ==
- January 1 – United Kingdom – Ilford rail crash: The 7:06 express from Clacton to London passed both distant and home signals. The express crashed into the side of a local train that had been crossing the tracks. 10 killed, 500 injured (including those reporting shock).
- 22 January - Mexico - Guadalajara train disaster, In Guadalajara, Mexico, a passenger train derailed due to a break failure, over 600 people were killed.
- March 18 – United Kingdom – A Lancashire and Yorkshire Railway express passenger train overruns signals and is in a rear-end collision with an empty stock train at Smithy Bridge, Lancashire. Four people are killed and 33 are injured.
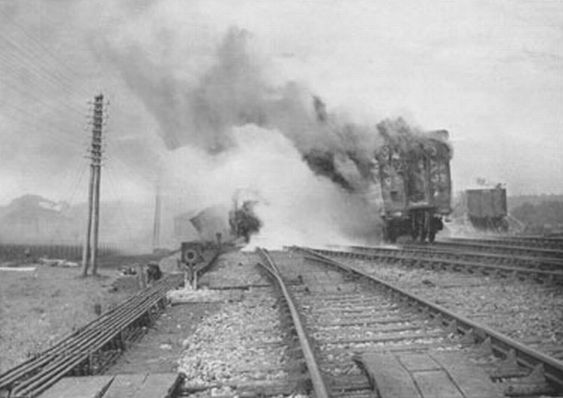
- Quintinshill rail disaster
  May 22 – United Kingdom – In the Quintinshill rail crash near Gretna Green, Scotland, a troop train collides with a stationary passenger train and another passenger train crashes into the wreckage, which also involves two stationary freight trains. The passenger cars are wooden-bodied and a serious fire ensues. The stationary passenger train was forgotten by a careless signalman, who had himself arrived on it, following improper operating practices during a shift change at this busy location. This is the deadliest railway accident in British history, with 226 fatalities and 246 people injured.
- August 14 – United Kingdom – Weedon rail crash: Express train derails after the track on the up main line is forced out of alignment by a detached coupling rod from a passing locomotive heading a down express. 10 passengers killed, 21 injured.
- October 19 – France – At Saint-Cyr-de-Favières, on the PLM railway, between Roanne and Lyon, several coaches of a derailed train fall into a deep ravine, killing seventeen soldiers.
- November 22 – United States – A train carrying traveling circus from Atlanta, Georgia to Girard, Alabama collided with a passenger train that had ignored a signal to stop at a junction near Columbus, Georgia. There were no fatalities on the passenger train. Reports conflict, but between 15 and 24 people aboard the circus train were killed. Most of the circus animals were killed in the resulting fires.
- December 15 – United Kingdom – A landslide near Warren Halt, Kent buries three people. A South Eastern and Chatham Railway train is derailed inside Martello Tunnel. The line is closed until 1 August 1919.
- December 17 – United Kingdom – St Bedes Junction rail crash: A passenger train collided with a banking engine in thick fog and another train crashed into the wreckage; 19 were killed.

== 1916 ==
- January 30 – Germany – Between Cologne and Duisburg, a hospital train full of wounded soldiers collided with an express, and one of the locomotives climbs on top of the other train. Officially only two people are killed, but reports of eyewitnesses arriving in Amsterdam disagree.
- February 2 – United Kingdom – The Penistone Viaduct in Yorkshire collapsed under a Lancashire and Yorkshire Railway locomotive due to subsidence.
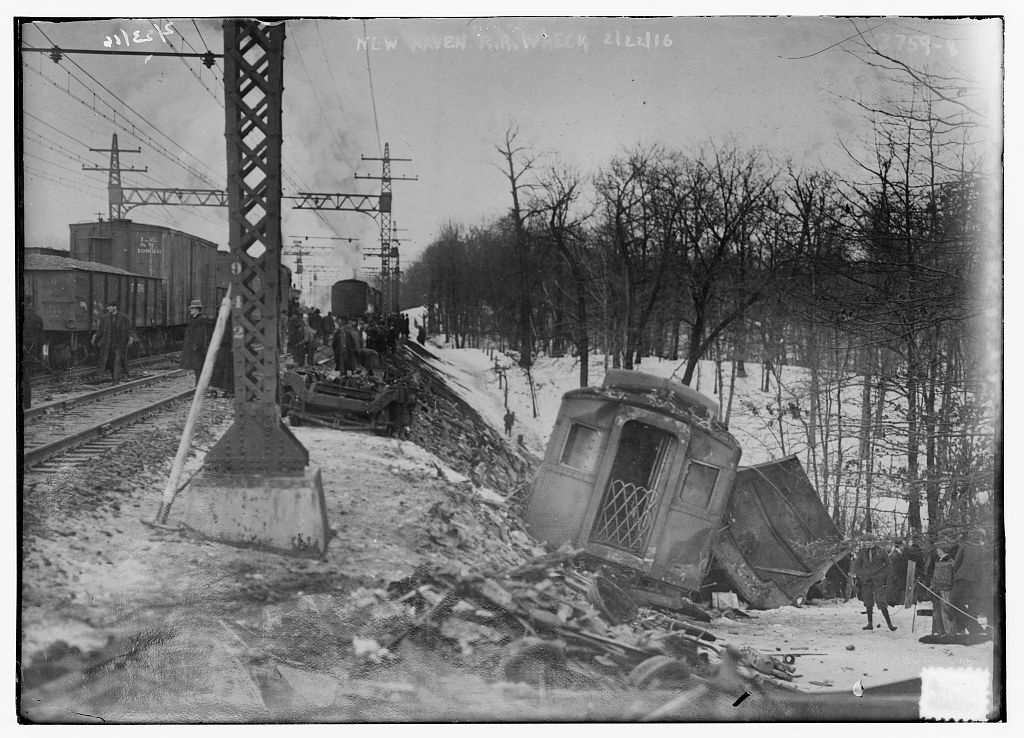
- New Haven Railroad accident on February 22, 1916
  February 22 – United States – Milford, Connecticut: New Haven Railroad. Nine people were killed.
- March 29 – United States – Amherst, Ohio: An overnight New York Central Railroad express eastbound from Chicago to Pittsburgh was operating in two sections; when the first was stopped by a signal, the second one ran into it at 50 mph (80 km/h), the wreckage fouled the next track, and the westbound 20th Century Limited, also at 50 mph, ran into it. 26 people aboard the eastbound trains were killed. It is disputed whether the signal was set against the second section.
- April 3 – United Kingdom – A London Brighton and South Coast Railway passenger train was derailed between Crowborough & Jarvis Brook and Buxted, East Sussex.
- June 2 – United States – Dayton Township, Butler County, Iowa: Rock Island Railroad passenger train No. 19 crashed at Flood Creek after a bridge collapsed. The normally shallow creek had sustained significant rain the day of the crash, and the flooded creek had caused the supports on the bridge to break. On the stormy night of June 2, 1916, as train No. 19 passed through Packard, and crossed Flood Creek on the bridge near Clarksville, the locomotive, tender, and several passenger cars made it across before the bridge collapsed under the rest of the train causing the immediate death of 16, and later the death of another passenger from his injuries. According to lifelong Clarksville resident, Francis Edeker, on the night of the crash, survivors of the crash on one side of the creek sought shelter at Francis's grandparents' house where they were treated for injuries.
- June 2 – United States – Negaunee, Michigan: Lake Superior and Ishpeming 2-8-0 No. 14 figured in a washout wreck while coming down a 1.6% grade, pulling over 40 loaded hoppers of iron ore. The locomotive and several of its hoppers tumbled down on their sides on a steep embankment. The possible cause of this accident was the significant rain that caused a lot of floods in some of the Midwest areas that day, which was also the cause of the No. 19 wreck in Iowa. According to The Railway and Locomotive Historical Society Bulletin No. 98 by Aurele A. Durocher, it took about a month to get the 14 re-railed, repaired, and brought back to service. Some of the derailed hoppers were presumably scrapped. It is unclear if the engineer, fireman, or leading brakeman were injured or killed. The 14 locomotive was repaired and is currently preserved at the Grand Canyon Railway as No. 29.
- August 12 – United States – Brookdale, Pennsylvania: A runaway train collides with an interurban on the Southern Cambria Railway, killing 26 people.
- September 26 – Austria-Hungary – between Medzilaborce and Łupków: a train of tank cars laden with gasoline collided at speed with a hospital train carrying sick and wounded soldiers home from the Eastern Front. The two trains caught fire and burned for two days. Officially 140 people were killed. Unofficial estimates suggest that the death toll may have been as much as twice that number.
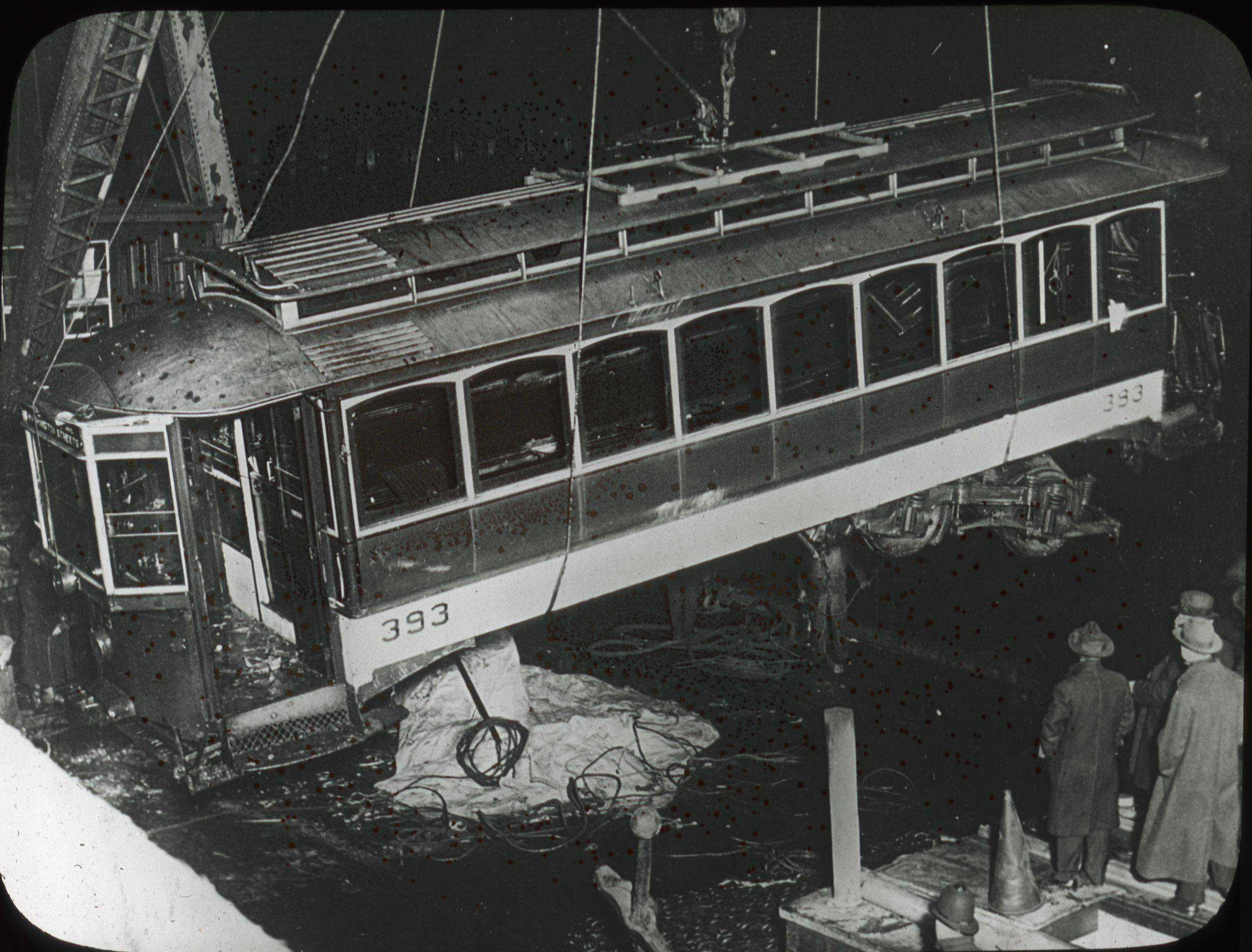
- Summer Street Bridge disaster
  November 2 - United States - Summer Street Bridge disaster, In Boston, Massachusetts, a streetcar train loaded with passengers ran off and derailed at an open drawbridge killing 46 people.
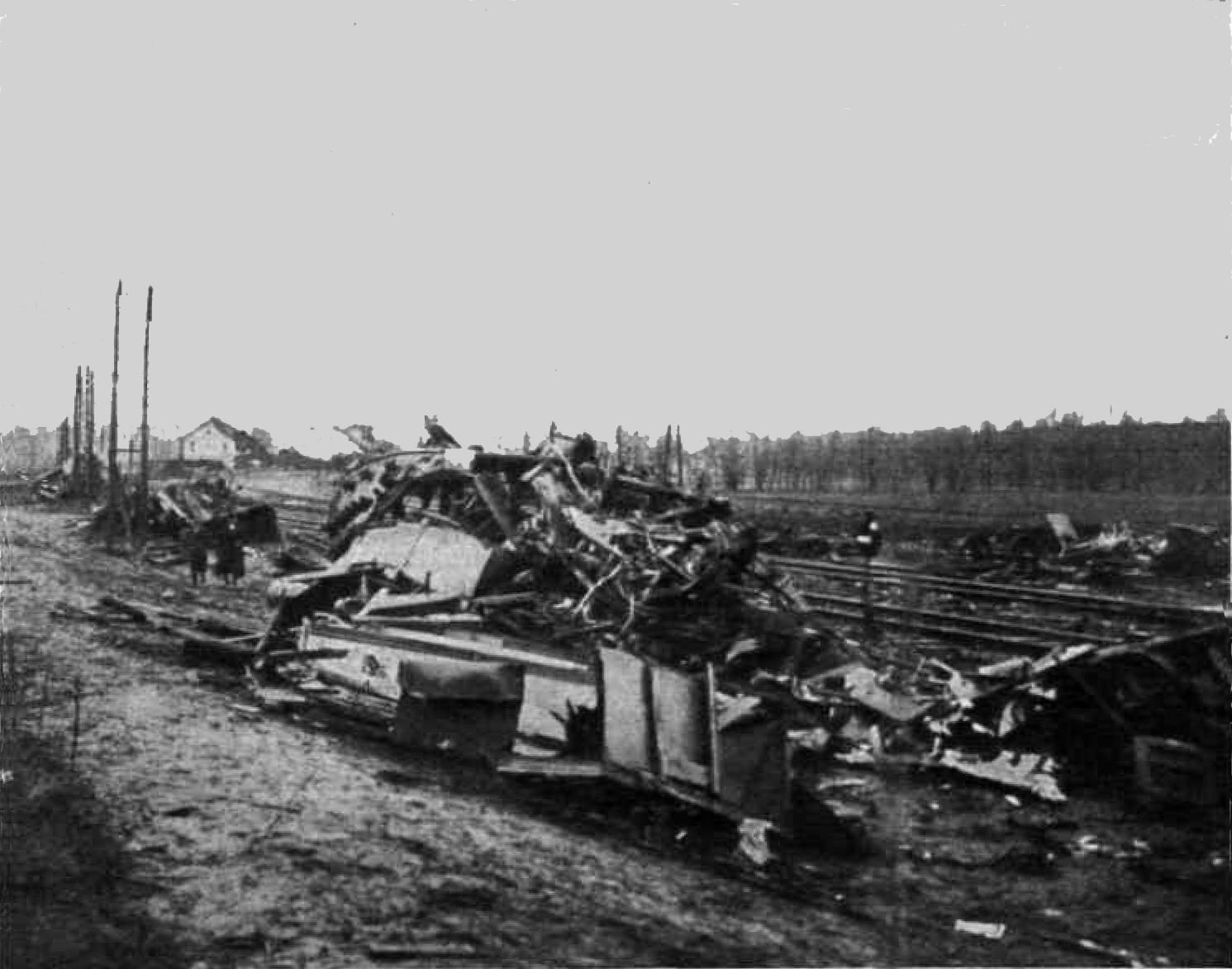
- Herceghalom rail crash
  December 1 – Austria-Hungary Herceghalom rail crash – At Herczechalen (now Herceghalom, Hungary), an express from Vienna to Budapest, carrying many soldiers back from the funeral of Emperor Franz Joseph I, collided with a local train, killing 66 people and injuring 150. It is suggested that a signal was missed in the dark because of the inferior fuel available in wartime for the oil-burning signal lamps.
- December 19 – United Kingdom – At Kiltimagh, Ireland, on the Great Southern and Western Railway, the driver of a train of 21 wagons loaded with ballast either missed or misread a danger signal and crashed into a train of empty wagons, killing five railwaymen and injuring seven.
- December 19 – United Kingdom – At Wigan, England, on the London and North Western Railway, the 11:15 pm train from London caught up with the late-running 10:00 pm train from London while the latter was reversing into a bay platform. The second train had two locomotives. The first driver apparently missed the signals set against his train, and the second one was unable to see them due to smoke and steam from the first engine. The trains collided, killing a crewman and a postal worker and injuring 11 people, mostly crew and postal workers.
- December 19 – United Kingdom – On the Caledonian Railway, a northbound postal train collided with a slower-moving goods train between Kirkpatrick and Kirtlebridge, Scotland, despite signals and detonators that should have stopped the second train at Kirkpatrick. One railwayman was killed and one seriously injured.

== 1917 ==
- January 3 – United Kingdom – Ratho rail crash: The unsafe use of hand signals results in 12 deaths.
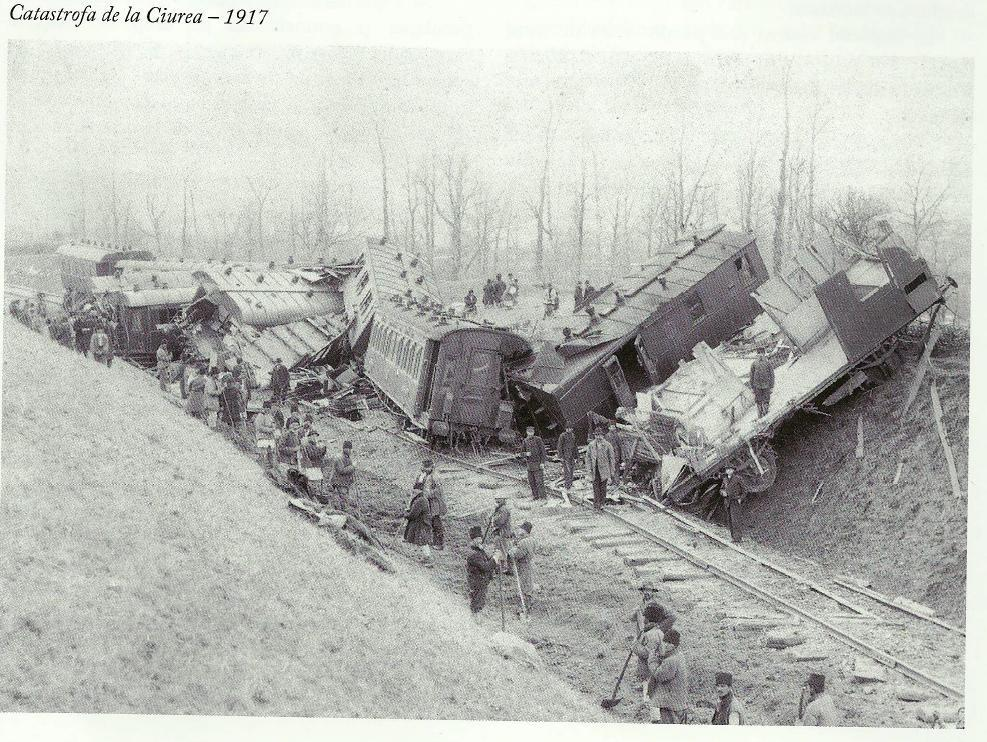
- Ciurea rail disaster
  January 13 – Romania – Ciurea rail disaster at Ciurea: A passenger train overloaded with soldiers and refugees runs away down a bank between Bârnova and Ciurea, derailing at Ciurea station after being diverted onto a loop line. Between 600 and 1,000 killed in the derailment and subsequent fire.
- January 17 – France – Massy – Palaiseau: A British troop train of 40 (presumably unbraked) cars, taking soldiers from Paris back to the front, comes apart into two portions, which then collide back together on a gradient; 10 people are killed and 30 injured.
- January 19 – Austria-Hungary – At Sagor (now Zagorje ob Savi, Slovenia), a mail train from Trieste to Vienna is wrecked by a rockslide, part buried and part falling into the Sava River. A rescue train is sent but collides with the wreckage. Altogether, 40 people are killed.
- February 27 – United States – Mount Union, Pennsylvania: A passenger train is rear-ended by a freight causing a telescope to occur. Twenty are killed in the accident.
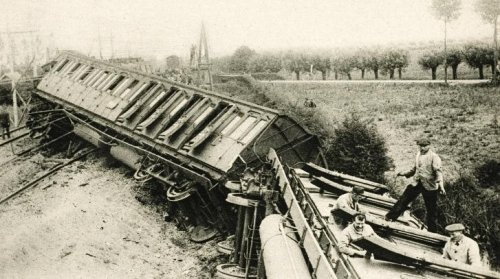
- Houten
  June 17 - Netherlands - Houten train accident: A passenger train is derailed at Houten, Utrecht. Queen Wilhelmina, a passenger on the train, survives unharmed.
- July 2 – United States – The Milwaukee Railroad's coast train, the Olympia, derailed across the river from LaCrosse, Wisconsin when the engineer A. B. Brown ignored the closed semaphore signal. The engine and tender and four cars were damaged.
- July 23 – British India – When a passenger train is stopped by track damage, a messenger is sent to bring a repair crew, but then it proves possible to repair the track. The train resumes its journey and collides with the repair train, killing 20 people.
- August 7 – Italy – An express from Genoa to Milan derails in Arquata Scrivia station, killing 34 people and injuring about 100.
- August 13 – Russia – A passenger train and a "luggage train" collide on the line from Moscow to Petrograd (now Saint Petersburg), killing 60 people and injuring 150.
- August 19 - United Kingdom - A tram runs away and derails at the foot of Crabble Road, Dover. 11 are killed and 61 injured. The accident is deemed to be a result of driver error and inexperience, compounded by the tram being severely overloaded.
- September 15 – United Kingdom – Ten carriages carrying troops runs away at Catterick Camp, Yorkshire and crashes near Catterick Bridge. Three soldiers are killed.
- September 24 – United Kingdom – Bere Ferrers rail accident: New Zealand troops travelling from Plymouth on the London and South Western Railway are told that two from each compartment should get off at the first stop, Exeter, to get food. The train is stopped by signals at Bere Ferrers. With the rear cars stopped outside the station, men in them assume this is Exeter and jump to ground level, using the same doors they boarded through, which puts them on the other track, where 10 are killed by an express from London to Plymouth.
- September 28 – United States – Kellyville, Oklahoma: Two trains on the St. Louis–San Francisco Railway collide due to a violation of train orders; 23 people and many cattle are killed, and 80 people injured.
- October 20 – United States – Clyde, New York – (Newspapers: Syracuse Herald, The Clyde Herald, and The Clyde Times) Mr. Barney Fredendall was struck by the N.Y.C. train and killed instantly. Part of the body was found east of the Glasgow Street crossing. One leg was found at Savannah. The other was not found.
- November 2 – Russia – Vladikavkaz: An express passenger train and a military train collide head-on, killing 25 people (mostly soldiers) and severely injuring 70.
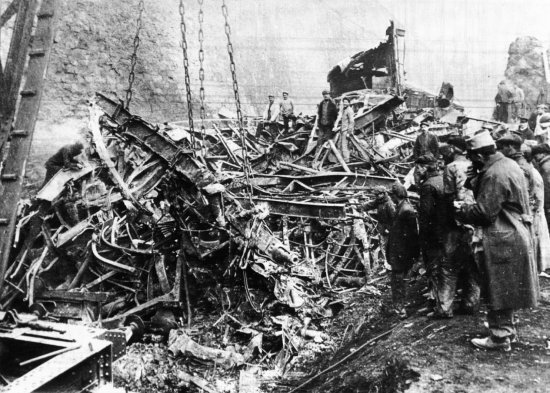
- Saint-Michel-de-Maurienne derailment
  December 12 – France – Saint-Michel-de-Maurienne derailment, (Saint-Michel-de-Maurienne near Modane on the Culoz–Modane railway): Carrying French troops from Italy, a grossly overloaded military train derails near the entrance of the station at Saint-Michel-de-Maurienne, after running away down a steep gradient from the entrance of the Fréjus Tunnel; brake power was insufficient for the weight of the train. Of those killed in the derailment and subsequent fire, 423 soldiers and 2 train employees were identified, but at last 675 and possibly 800 were killed altogether. The military had forced the driver to run the overloaded train. This accident is still the worst ever in France.
- December 14 – United States – Two Southern Railway passenger trains collide at 0815 hrs. near Clemson College, South Carolina with the fireman and baggageman on one (train no. 46) killed, both engines demolished and cars leaving the rails and one overturning down an embankment. Train Nos. 43 and 46 strike each other on a curve, one mile (1,600 m) north of Calhoun, South Carolina. Blame was laid on an operator's failure to give orders to the crew of Train No. 46 at Seneca, South Carolina.
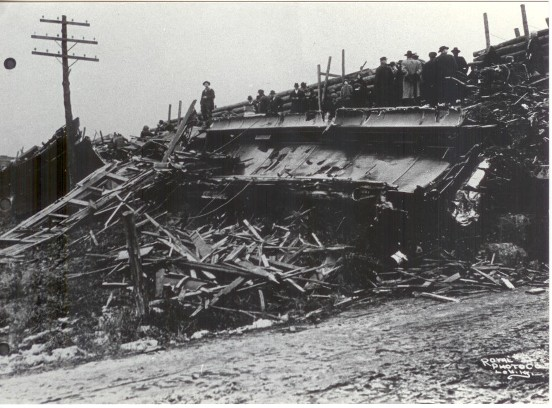
- Shepherdsville train wreck
  December 20 – United States – Shepherdsville train wreck, a rear-end collision in Shepherdsville, Kentucky kills 49 people.
- December 29 – United States – Two Baltimore and Ohio Railroad passenger trains collide a mile (1600 m) east of North Vernon, Indiana, killing eight people and injuring 21. The trains met in a head-on collision, each emerging from a curve with only about 500 feet (150 m) of straight track between them.

== 1918 ==
- January 8 – Germany – A train carrying troops going on leave collides with another train between Kaiserslautern and Homburg, killing at least 30 and injuring at least 100.
- January 9 – United Kingdom – Little Salkeld rail accident: A Midland Railway train from London to Glasgow is derailed by a landslip in a cutting, killing seven passengers.
- January 14 – United States – A Houston and Texas Central Railway passenger train derails at Hammond, Texas. 17 killed, 10 injured.
- January 16 – Germany – At Kirn, a flash flood in the river Nahe caused by a dam failure washes out an embankment, and several cars of a train go into the water. Only 10 bodies are found in the first few days, but eventually the death toll is reported as 25, with 25 injured.
- January 16 – Germany – At Bohmte on the line between Bremen and Osnabrück, two trains collide in a snowstorm; 33 are killed and 110 injured, all soldiers.
- January 18 – Germany – At Argeningkem (now Artyomovka, Kaliningrad Oblast, Russia) in East Prussia, south of Tilsit (now Sovetsk, Kaliningrad Oblast, Russia), a train carrying soldiers on leave collides with a passenger train, killing 23 people and injuring 50.
- January 18 – United Kingdom – Two Cambrian Railways freight trains were in a head-on collision at Park Hall, Shropshire, killing one railwayman. Both drivers were found to have tablets for the same section, but investigation did not reveal how this was even possible. At least one of the signalmen at Oswestry North and Ellesmere Junction signal boxes must have behaved irregularly, and suspicion fell on the design of the circuitry connecting their boxes.
- February 7 – Austria-Hungary – A fire on board a crowded train from Stanislav (now Ivano-Frankivsk) to Lvov (now Lviv) brings it to a stop at midnight on a bridge between Jezupol and Wodniki (now Yezupil and Vodnyky; all these places are now in Ukraine). Many people are killed, including passengers who jump into the Dniester River and drown.
- March 15 – United States – Two women passengers are killed and 30–40 others sustain cuts and bruises when WB train No. 19 of the Pennsylvania Railroad is struck by a rock slide in a cut near Elizabethtown, Pennsylvania, with a large boulder overturning two Pullman cars in the middle of the consist.
- April 11 – France – Twenty-nine men of the 4th Battalion Kings Liverpool Regiment were killed in a troop train explosion. They were buried in the military cemetery at Chocques in the Pas de Calais.
- April 15 – United States – Central Islip, New York (now Islandia, New York) – Long Island Rail Road troop train leaving Camp Upton derails at Foot's Crossing (now the NY 454 bridge). Originally believed to be a result of enemy sabotage, but later found to be caused by defective rails. 3 soldiers dead and 36 soldiers injured.
- April 18 – United Kingdom – A London Brighton and South Coast Railway freight train becomes divided with the result that four wagons come to rest in Redhill Tunnel, Surrey. A signalman's error allows the following train to crash into the wagons. The line is blocked for two days.
- May 9 – United States – A trainman is killed and several passengers injured late this date when the railway post office car and one coach of a St. Louis–San Francisco Railway passenger train derails near Heyburn, Oklahoma.
- May 10 – United States – As a troop train carrying the advance guard of the 321st Infantry departs Camp Jackson, Columbia, South Carolina, for Camp Sevier, near Greenville, a broken wheel under one coach, wooden, causes it to derail at ~1000 hrs. and drops the car from a high trestle near the camp, and pulls the second coach, steel, with it. Seven soldiers are killed immediately and ten others seriously injured, three of whom are not expected to live.
- May 13 – United States – The Buffalo Special passenger train derailed at Schodack Landing late at night. Four men killed, over 40 people injured.
- June 5 – United States – Due to a claimed mistake in train orders, a local passenger train collides head-on into the engine of a work train in a tunnel on the Central Vermont Railroad, between Burlington and Winooski, killing five and injuring several others. Seven are removed to hospital but no passengers are killed.
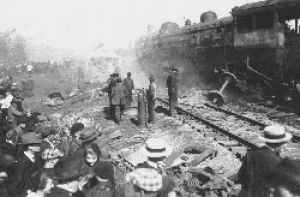
- Hammond Circus train wreck
  June 22 – United States – Hammond Circus train wreck, near Hammond, Indiana: An empty Michigan Central Railroad troop train collides into the rear end of the stopped Hagenbeck-Wallace circus train, resulting in 86 deaths and 127 injured. The engineer of the troop train had been taking "kidney pills" that had a narcotic effect, and he was asleep at the throttle.
- June 29(?) – Romania – An express passenger train collides with a goods train between Mircești and Roman, killing 45.
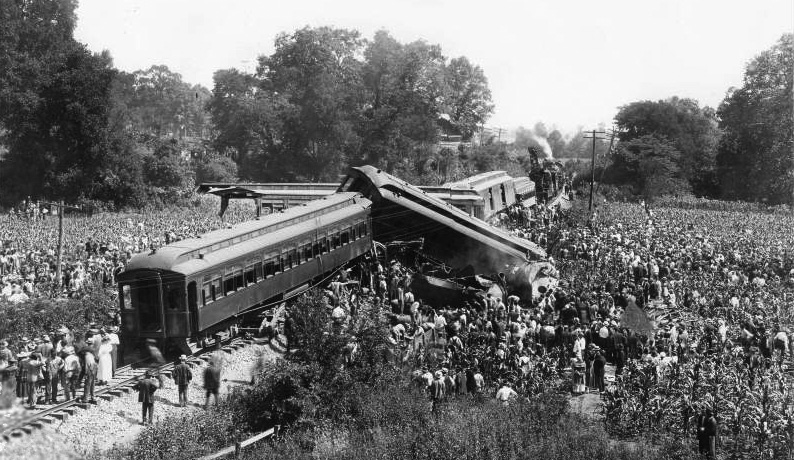
- The Great Train Wreck of 1918 near Nashville, Tennessee.
  July 9 – United States – Great Train Wreck of 1918, Nashville, Tennessee: Two Nashville, Chattanooga and St. Louis Railway trains collide head-on. 101 killed, 171 injured at Shops Junction-West Nashville, Tennessee.
- July 16 – France – A Paris-Orléans railway train derails at Theillay, killing 22 people and injuring 76.
- July 31 – Germany – Two trains collide between Schneidemühl and Landsberg (now Piła and Górowo Iławeckie, both in Poland); 30 people are killed. A crowd of looters forms and several are arrested.
- August 8 – France – German ammunition train entering Harbonnières station is shelled by advancing British Mark V tanks. The train explodes; a following troop train on an adjacent track is stopped and captured by British troops.
- August 11 – United Kingdom – A fire at the North Eastern Railway carriage sheds at Heaton, Northumberland destroys 34 vehicles. They are all replaced by new vehicles with identical running numbers.
- August – Austrian-occupied territory in Italy – Two trains taking soldiers on leave collide at Uggowitz (now Uggovizza or Ukve) on the line between Villach and Pemtaffl; 20 people are killed and 80 injured.
- September 11 – Germany – At Schneidemühl (now Piła, Poland), a goods train collides with a children's excursion; 33 children and 2 railwaymen are killed, and 17 people injured.
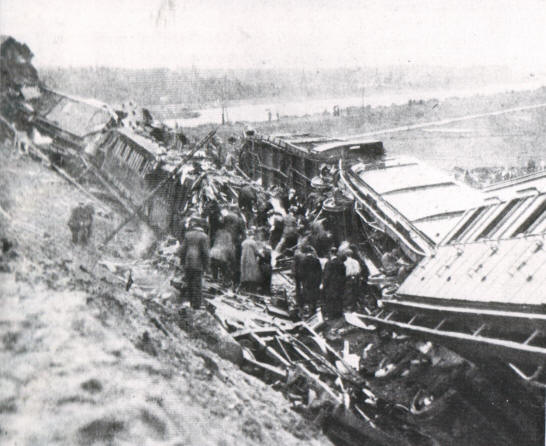
- Weesp, Netherlands.
  September 13 – Netherlands – Weesp train disaster, Weesp, Netherlands. Heavy rainfall caused the embankment leading to the Merwedekanaal bridge to become unstable. When a passenger train approached the bridge the track slid off the embankment, causing the carriages to crash into each other and the locomotive to hit the bridge. 41 persons were killed and 42 injured. In the aftermath of the disaster, it was decided to establish a dedicated study of soil mechanics at the Delft University of Technology.
- September 19, 1918 – France – On the PLM railway, three cars break away from the rear of a train; the resulting collision in the Pacy Tunnel kills about 30 people and injures about 100.
- September 23 – Germany – A train from Leipzig crashes into the back of one from Berlin; 30 people are killed and 59 injured, 30 of them seriously.
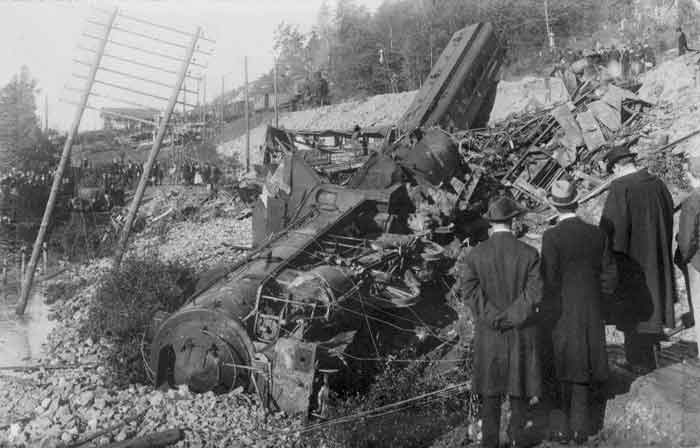
- Getå Railroad Disaster October 1918.
  October 1 – Sweden – Getå railroad disaster: A mixed train from Malmö to Stockholm is derailed at about 70 km/h (43 mph) when heavy rain causes an embankment to collapse, and the crashed cars burn. At least 42 people are killed and 41 injured.
- October 2 – United States – A burning trestle over Cox creek, two miles (3.2 km) north of Arcadia, Kansas caused the wrecking of Frisco Passenger train No. 101 at about 5 PM. Engineer A.F. McCullough and Fireman Charles Mahan remained at their posts trying to stop the train. McCullough and Mahan died but saved all others on board. The engine and coal tender collapsed the weakened bridge burying McCullough and Mahan in their cabs. The passengers escaped from their coaches before the entire train was consumed by fire.
- October 12 – Spain – Two passenger trains collide at Selerra after a switch is set wrongly; 67 are killed and 25 seriously injured.
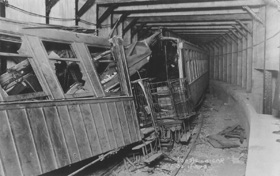
- The Malbone wreck train, November 1, 1918
  November 1 – United States – The Malbone Street wreck occurs on the Brooklyn Rapid Transit Company (BRT) in New York City when an inexperienced motorman (pressed into service due to a strike by the Brotherhood of Locomotive Engineers) drives one of the system's elevated trains too quickly into a very sharp curve, derailing the train in a tunnel, killing at least 93 and injuring over 100.
- November 6 – Austria-Hungary – A broken axle derails a troop train between Steinbruch (now Kőbánya) and Rákos, both near Budapest, now in Hungary; 60 are killed and 180 injured.
- December 7 – France – A collision at Lothiers, south of Châteauroux on the Paris-Orléans railway, kills 68 people and injures 151.
- Late 1918 – Belgium – Between Namur and Liège, a train passes through a tunnel where Scottish soldiers, riding on the roof, are hit by scaffolding and 17 are killed.

== 1919 ==
- January 12 – United States – Genesee County, New York. The New York Central Southwestern Limited rammed the back of the Wolverine at South Byron. A Pullman sleeping car was pushed upward and fell on top of another Pullman sleeper, killing 22 people.
- January 22 – France – At Mauvages, between Neufchâteau and Toul on the Chemins de fer de l'Est, a collision kills 20 and injures 40.
- February 16(?) – Belgian Congo – At Kambove, a freight wagon full of explosives explodes. There are 27 deaths, including everyone on the train.
- April 17 – France – At Crissé on the Chemins de fer de l'État, a train carrying French soldiers on leave stops due to engine trouble. Although detonators are put down to protect it, the following train, taking American soldiers to Brest to return home, is going too fast downhill and is unable to stop. The collision kills 33 people.
- May 5 – United Kingdom – A South Eastern and Chatham Railway freight train is in a rear-end collision with another at Paddock Wood, Kent due to driver error.
- June 19 – British India – At Firozabad, the wrong tablet is issued to goods train 127, which proceeds onto the single-track section to Makkhanpur instead of waiting for passenger train 7. The collision kills all four enginemen and fifteen passengers, and starts a fire that kills many more, perhaps 100 to 300 deaths altogether.
- June 29 – British India – A mail train from Delhi collides with a freight train at Rohtak; 35 are killed and 46 injured.
- August 14 – United States – near Parkersburg, West Virginia. A Baltimore & Ohio Railroad switching engine collided with a streetcar operated by the Parkersburg Interurban Trolley System carrying a number of women and children from Marietta and Reno, Ohio on a church picnic. 15 people were killed by scalding when the steam lines ruptured and twenty-three more were injured. One witness died from a stroke after witnessing the tragedy.
- September 1 – United States – Hubbard Woods crossing, Chicago, Illinois. A Chicago & Northwestern passenger train strikes Mary Tanner, a pedestrian whose shoe was caught on the rail while crossing the tracks, killing her. The impact also killed her husband William Fitch Tanner and grievously injured John Miller, a railroad flagman, when they refused to give up trying to free her.
- September 4 – France – A train from Paris to Toulouse stops between Castelnau-d'Estrétefonds and Saint-Jory due to bad coal. It is struck in the rear by the following train from Bordeaux to Cette (now Sète), killing 15 people and injuring 40.
- October 5 – Mexico – A train from Laredo, Texas, to Mexico City derails, killing 60 people.
- October 16 – United States – Marlboro, New Jersey. On the Freehold-Atlantic Highlands branch of the Central of New Jersey Railroad. A locomotive and a baggage car leave the track. The train struck a truck at a grade crossing 300 yards (270 m) west of the Marlboro NJ station. The train overturned with tracks torn off, the engine lay on its side. The forward cars were torn loose and were turned at right angles. It resulted in one death as the engineer, Michael Mooney, was scalded to death.
- October 25 – Germany – At Kranowitz (now Krzanowice, Poland), a passenger and freight train collide and catch fire. There are 25 deaths. The site is near the German border with Austria-Hungary (now the Polish border with Czechia) and reportedly most of the victims were alcohol smugglers, who may have fed the flames by trying to dump the evidence.
- October 29 – United States – Near Acton, California, Southern Pacific train number 50, the southbound San Joaquin Flyer, derails on a downgrade curve, with the engine and tender going into a ditch followed by the baggage car and seven coaches. Four coaches, the diner, and three Pullmans remain on the rails. Five are killed, including the engineer, and 143 injured. Excessive speed on the curve is said to be the cause. Southern Pacific technical experts inform the coroner's jury that the train derailed as it hit the curve in excess of 45 mph (72 km/h), and the general superintendent of the S.P. shops further expressed the opinion that the engineer may have been either dead or unconscious at his post before the accident.
- November 1 – Denmark – Vigerslev train crash: An express train collided at speed with a stopped train due to a dispatcher error. 40 people were killed and about 60 injured.
- November 1 – France – At Pont-sur-Yonne on the PLM railway, the Simplon Express is stopped by signals, but a Paris-Geneva express overruns its signals and crashes into the first train's rear. The number of deaths is variously reported as 18 or 26, the injured as 42 to 60.
- November – Passengers remembering the September 4 and November 1 accidents in France become fearful when their train from Juvisy to Paris is stopped for some time. Some of them decide to get out—and stand on the other track, where four are killed by another train.
- December 10 – Anatolia – An Ottoman Railway train collides with another train at a junction; 35 are killed or injured.
- December 20 – United States – Onawa train wreck, Maine. A Canadian Pacific Railway passenger train running across Maine between Canadian cities collides head-on with a freight train, killing 23.
- December 20 – United States – Missouri Valley, Iowa – Twenty-four are injured, eleven seriously, two of whom are expected to die, when a Chicago and Northwestern Railway fast mail train from Chicago encounters an open switch and strikes train number 215, from Minneapolis, standing on a sidetrack, telescoping the rear coach. Medical attention is rushed from Omaha, and many of the injured taken to hospitals there.
- December 20 – United States – Redding, California – Passengers aboard the second section of Southern Pacific Railroad train number 54, the through-Portland passenger train, avoid injury when the locomotive and the first seven cars derail due to a broken rail. Four baggage cars, one tourist Pullman, the dining car, and a standard Pullman derail, with the Pullmans sliding down an embankment. The standard Pullman was unoccupied. The sole injury is suffered by the baggageman, whose thumb is crushed.
- December 22 – United States – Near Topeka, Kansas. Engineer David E. Hartigan, Sr., 23 years an engineer for the Rock Island Railroad, was returning to St. Joseph, Missouri from Topeka with a trainload of Christmas shoppers, some even standing in the aisles. Every seat in the eight coaches was occupied. A freight train was accidentally sent on a collision course with the passenger train and they met near Elmont, Kansas. Hartigan stuck to his cab, applying the brake until the collision. He was scalded to death. His sacrifice possibly saved 200 persons from death or injury. Forty people were slightly injured. No one else was killed.

== See also ==
- List of London Underground accidents

== Sources ==
- "Europe's history of rail disasters". BBC. October 11, 2006.
- "World's worst rail disasters". BBC. December 19, 2007.
- "GenDisasters Train Wrecks 1869–1943". Archived from the original on 2015-04-16.
- "Interstate Commerce Commission Investigations of Railroad Accidents 1911–1993". U.S. Department of Transportation. Archived from the original on 2004-10-12.
- Beebe, Lucius & Clegg, Charles (1952). Hear the train blow; a pictorial epic of America in the railroad age. New York: Grosset & Dunlap. ASIN B000I83FTC.
- "Terrible Wreck Of A Red Cross Train". The Cape Weekly Tribune. Cape Girardeau, Cape Girardeau, Missouri: Cape Girardeau Pub. Co. 2021. p. 6. ISSN 2326-8875. OCLC 19956242.
- Gerard, Malcolm; Hamilton, J. A. B. (1981) [1967]. Trains to Nowhere. London: George Allen & Unwin. ISBN 0-04-385084-7.
- Earnshaw, Alan (1989). Trains in Trouble: Vol. 5. Penryn: Atlantic Books. ISBN 0-906899-35-4.
- Earnshaw, Alan (1990). Trains in Trouble: Vol. 6. Penryn: Atlantic Books. ISBN 0-906899-37-0.
- Earnshaw, Alan (1991). Trains in Trouble: Vol. 7. Penryn: Atlantic Books. ISBN 0-906899-50-8.
- Earnshaw, Alan (1993). Trains in Trouble: Vol. 8. Penryn: Atlantic Books. ISBN 0-906899-52-4.
- Gould, David (2000). Maunsell's SR Steam Carriage Stock. Headington, Oxford: The Oakwood Press. ISBN 9780853615552.
- Haine, Edgar A. (1993). Railroad Wrecks. New York: Cornwall Books. ISBN 978-0-8453-4844-4.
- Hall, Stanley (1990). The Railway Detectives. London: Ian Allan. ISBN 0-7110-1929-0.
- Hoole, Ken (1982). Trains in Trouble: Vol. 3. Redruth: Atlantic Books. ISBN 0-906899-05-2.
- Hoole, Ken (1983). Trains in Trouble: Vol. 4. Truro: Atlantic Books. ISBN 0-906899-07-9.
- Karr, Ronald D. (1995). The Rail Lines of Southern New England – A Handbook of Railroad History. Branch Line Press. ISBN 978-0-942147-02-5.
- Kidner, R. W. (1977) [1963]. The South Eastern and Chatham Railway. Tarrant Hinton: The Oakwood Press.
- Kichenside, Geoffrey (1997). Great Train Disasters. Bristol: Siena Books. ISBN 0-75252-630-8.
- Leslie, Frank (1882-01-21). Illustrated Newspaper. Vol. LIII, no. 1, 374. New York. p. 1.
- Moody, G. T. (1979) [1957]. Southern Electric 1909–1979 (Fifth ed.). Shepperton: Ian Allan Ltd. ISBN 0-7110-0924-4.
- Reed, Robert C. (1968). Train Wrecks – A Pictorial History of Accidents on the Main Line. New York: Bonanza Books. ISBN 978-0-517-32897-2.
- Rolt, L. T. C.; Kichenside, G. M. (1982). Red for Danger: A history of railway accidents and railway safety (4th ed.). Newton Abbot, Devon: David & Charles. ISBN 0-7153-8362-0. OCLC 9526651.
- Semmens, Peter (1994). Railway Disasters of the World: Principal Passenger Train Accidents of the 20th Century. Patrick Stephens Ltd. ISBN 1-85260-323-2.
- Shaw, Robert B. (1978). A History of Railroad Accidents, Safety Precautions and Operating Practices. LCCN 78104064.
- Smith, Peter (1978). Footplate over the Mendips. Oxford: Oxford Publishing Company. ISBN 0-86093-022-X.
- Spence, Jeoffry (1975). Victorian & Edwardian Railways from old photographs. London: Batsford. ISBN 0-7134-3044-3.
- Trevena, Arthur (1980). Trains in Trouble: Vol. 1. Redruth: Atlantic Books. ISBN 0-906899-01-X.
- Trevena, Arthur (1981). Trains in Trouble: Vol. 2. Redruth: Atlantic Books. ISBN 0-906899-03-6.
- Vaughan, Adrian (1989). Obstruction Danger. Wellingborough: Patrick Stephens Limited. ISBN 1-85260-055-1.
- "TimesMachine: 20 U.S. Soldiers killed in wreck; 102 Others Maimed as Troop Train Falls Through High Trestle in Mississippi". New York Times. October 20, 1913.
