= Spanish River derailment =

Train wreck

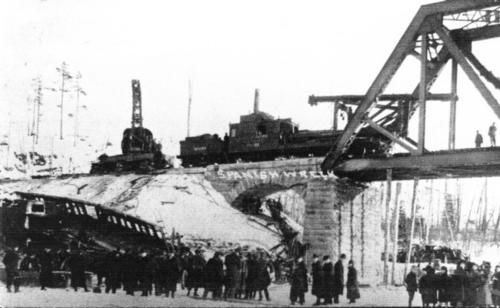

Details
- Date: January 21, 1910; 116 years ago
- Location: near Nairn, Ontario
- Coordinates: 46.30106°N 81.67491°W
- Country: Canada
- Operator: Canadian Pacific Railway
- Owner: Canadian Pacific Railway
- Incident type: Derailment

Statistics
- Trains: 1
- Passengers: 100
- Deaths: Estimated 43–70

The Spanish River derailment was a rail transport accident that occurred on 21 January 1910, on the Canadian Pacific Railway (CPR) Webbwood Subdivision, where the railway crosses the Spanish River near the settlement of Nairn near Sudbury, Ontario, Canada. A westbound passenger express train derailed and crashed into the Spanish River bridge, killing at least 43 passengers, though the death count varies. The cause was never established, but was believed to be poor track condition and/or speeding and braking on a curve.

== Disaster ==
=== Derailment ===
Accounts of the derailment are widely conflicting. This is likely due to a multitude of factors, such as the relatively low number of survivors, the fact that there were no external witnesses to the crash, and the fact that some details were reported incorrectly by newspapers throughout North America in the days that followed the crash.

During the early afternoon on 21 January 1910, the Canadian Pacific Railway's (CPR) No. 7 Soo Express passenger train was travelling west along the Webbwood Subdivision line, carrying 100 passengers. It consisted of seven cars along with the engine: a baggage car, a mail car, a colonist car, a second-class coach, a first-class coach, a dining car, and a sleeping car (commonly known at the time as a Pullman car). While rounding a curve in the lead-up to the Spanish River bridge, the train began lurching from side to side. At some point, the second-class coach became detached from the front of the train in the run up to the bridge, but was driven forward by momentum and derailed.

The second-class coach rammed into the iron structure of the bridge, which cleaved it into two pieces, and burst into flames as a result of the oil stoves used to heat its interior. One half of the coach immediately fell into the river below while second half of the coach remained on the tracks, causing an obstacle which led to the derailment of the remainder of the train. The first-class coach was the second car to fall from the bridge embankment, breaking cleanly through the ice and sinking deep into the river. Following the first-class coach, the dining car was the third to fall into the river, but less deeply than the first-class coach, sparing the kitchen end of the car. The sleeping car turned on its side into a snowbank and was largely protected from the consequences of the crash.

A number of factors influenced the outcome of the crash and the disproportionately large number of deaths. The nearest town was Nairn, Ontario, which is around 5 miles (8.0 km) to the east. This denied survivors of the crash an immediate source of aid. Additionally, the fires on the relatively densely-packed second-class coach doomed most passengers in both halves, as the half which did not fall into the ice was suspended above the river while its burning passengers jumped or fell onto the ice. Nevertheless, the first-class coach, which was spared much of the immediate impact of the crash and fell into the ice relatively intact, had the highest rate of deaths, as even if passengers were able to escape through windows or doors, it was likely they would have died in the freezing water, unable to break through the ice on the surface. As a result, only one passenger from the first-class coach was reported to have survived. In comparison, the sleeping car, which had a large number of injuries, had no deaths during or after the crash, but created a large group of casualties which needed rescue.

=== Rescue efforts ===
After the initial impact, uninjured or lightly-injured members of the crew, along with passengers, began to engage in rescue efforts. This was complicated by the fact that survivors were divided by the icy river and a bridge that was clogged with burning wreckage. William Dundas, the mail clerk aboard the train, survived the crash from his relatively safe position near the front of the train and began to help survivors. Meanwhile, the brakeman in the second-class coach, who had been miraculously thrown onto the ice, joined in the rescue efforts and ultimately was one of the people who undertook the long trek to Nairn through snow. The conductor of the train, Thomas Reynolds of North Bay, was one of the people to escape from the submerged dining car by swimming through the freezing river. He helped several passengers through the roof hatch, saving their lives. One of these passengers was the local industrialist and lumber baron William J. Bell, who was seriously injured but survived the crash. These rescuers were later joined by two workers from the Dickson Bridge Company, who had been constructing a bridge further up the river.

Ultimately, it was five hours before real assistance arrived to the crash site, and by then many injured people had died. The surviving injured passengers were taken to the hospital in Sudbury. Early estimates of the death count began around 40, and the official death count is often reported at 43 or 44. The Spanish River Pulp and Paper Company dam, located a few miles downstream in Espanola, had its operators raise the water level at the bridge by four feet, which slowed the current in the river and made it easier to recover bodies at the crash site.

== Aftermath and legacy ==
At the time of its occurrence, the Spanish River derailment was the worst disaster in the CPR's history (though its death count is on par with the deaths of railway maintenance workers as a result of the 1910 Rogers Pass avalanche several months later), as well as one of the worst Canadian rail disasters in decades. Most previous mass casualty derailments in Canada, such as the Jeannette's Creek train wreck and the St-Hilaire train disaster, happened in the 1850–60s, when railway technology was still new in the country and before the formation of the CPR. While a definitive cause was never established, poor track condition in winter, as well as the claims of improper speed and braking on the curve in the lead-up to the bridge, have both been cited as factors contributing to the crash. A similar derailment at a curve to the east of Nairn in 1906 (which caused one death and a number of injuries) had resulted in the curve being gentled, and the stretch of track in the lead-up to the bridge was known by locals to suffer from spreading and breaking, something which may not have been known to the train crew. A jury investigation after the crash questioned whether three sectionmen were sufficient to keep their 8-mile (13 km) section in safe condition during brutal northern Ontario winters, and identified a lack of emergency equipment and exits as possible factors limiting the survival odds of people on board.

Some modern estimates of the death count range as high as 63 or even 70. Aside from the deaths in the Rogers Pass avalanche, which were not directly connected with train operations, it would go unparallelled in deaths until the 2013 Lac-Mégantic rail disaster, which killed 47 people and destroyed much of the town of Lac-Mégantic, Quebec.

Today, the line continues to see regular freight traffic, though passenger traffic dwindled in the mid-20th century and local stations were closed throughout the 1960s–80s. As passenger rail services were increasingly cut back, residents in the nearby blue-collar milling and railway towns began to rely on Greyhound coaches and personal automobiles to travel. Freight services retracted after improvements to Highway 17 and, with shifting economic factors, the branch line to Little Current on Manitoulin (a remnant of the Algoma Eastern Railway) was abandoned up to just south of the pulp and paper mill at Espanola. In keeping with its origins, the line's traffic was predominantly industrial, relating to nearby mining, lumber, and pulp and paper operations, as well other major industrial freight customers in the region such as Algoma Steel, and through traffic travelling between the CPR's transcontinental mainline and Michigan.

The Webbwood Subdivision, the official railway subdivision where the crash took place, is still owned by the CPR. In 1997, it was leased to the Huron Central Railway (HCRY), which is a subsidiary of Genesee & Wyoming. Under HCRY management, there have been several more recent derailments, none of which occurred near the Spanish River bridge. A 2014 derailment east of Nairn that resulted in the spilling of 25,000 litres (6,600 US gal) of diesel fuel caused concern for local residents with groundwater wells, as well as for the Spanish River. An investigation by the Transportation Safety Board of Canada relating to one derailment in 2015 found that "a large number of rail joint defects were allowed to remain in service." The accident occurred when an HCRY freight train derailed while travelling at 25 miles per hour (40 km/h) near the town of Spanish. In 2020, the HCRY filed for closure of the line.

== See also ==
- List of rail accidents (1910–1919)
- List of rail accidents in Canada
- 1910 in Canada
