= 1910 Ignacio rail accident =

Railway incident in California, United States

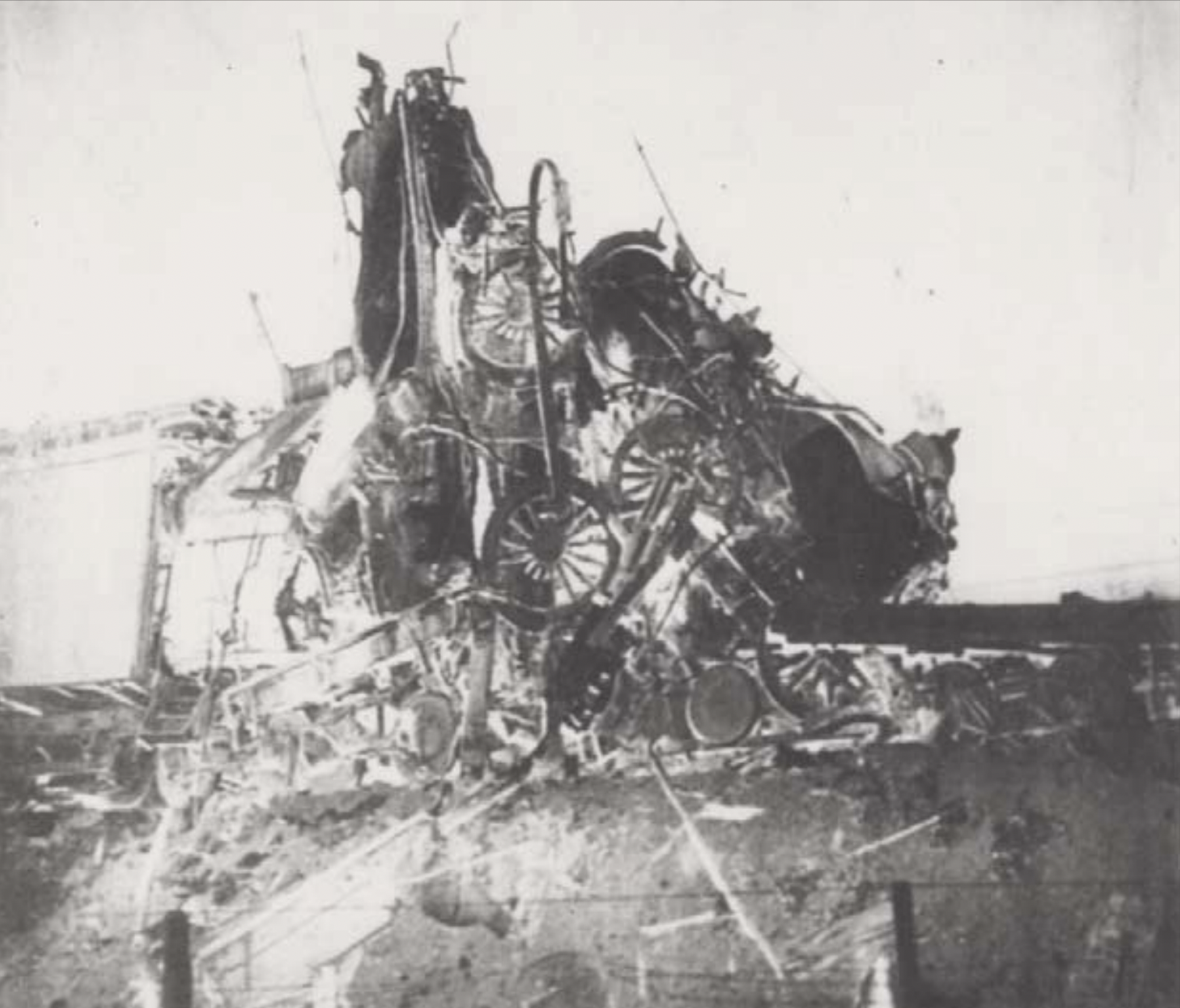
- The aftermath of the accident

Details
- Date: August 8th, 1910; 6:46 pm
- Location: Novato, California
- Coordinates: 38°03′08″N 122°31′17″W
- Country: United States
- Operator: San Francisco and North Pacific Railroad
- Cause: Ignored communication

Statistics
- Trains: 2
- Crew: 6
- Deaths: ~16
- Injured: ~30

The 1910 Ignacio rail accident was a head-on train crash in Novato, California, which occurred on August 8, 1910 at around 6:36 pm. It killed ~16 people and injured ~60.

== Background ==
The northbound train was San Francisco and North Pacific No. 6, a regularly scheduled passenger train running from San Francisco to Santa Rosa. It was a 6 car train, consisting of 1 baggage car and 5 passenger cars, one of which was a crowded smoking car. There were multiple important people aboard, notably Antonio DeBorba (known for building many of Novato's levees) and James William Cain (who had just received the telephone franchise for Novato in 1908. It had just departed San Rafael at 6:20 pm, and was on track to arrive in Ignacio by 6:40.

The southbound train was a work train (led by SF&NP No. 18, also known as "Vichy"), and it wasn't on the timetable. It was hauling a caboose and 2 flatcars, one of which was carrying a steamroller. On its way south from the Santa Rosa plain, it was supposed to stop at the Ignacio station to allow the other train to pass before entering the single-track section between Novato and San Rafael. It arrived at the Ignacio station at 6:32, 8 minutes before the scheduled arrival of the passenger train.

== Crash ==
Although the work train was supposed to wait at Ignacio to allow the passenger train to pass, the work train decided to go for no apparent reason. Conductor George Flaherty later stated that he thought another train that had passed was No. 6. The northbound passenger train was going at a speed of 40 mph (64 km/h), and the work train was going fast as well. As the 2 trains came into view of each other, the 3-man crew of the passenger train put the train into reverse before jumping out. The only man on the work train to jump out on time was the conductor, George Flaherty. The two steam trains slammed together with a sound so loud, that it was said it could be heard in Novato.

== Aftermath ==
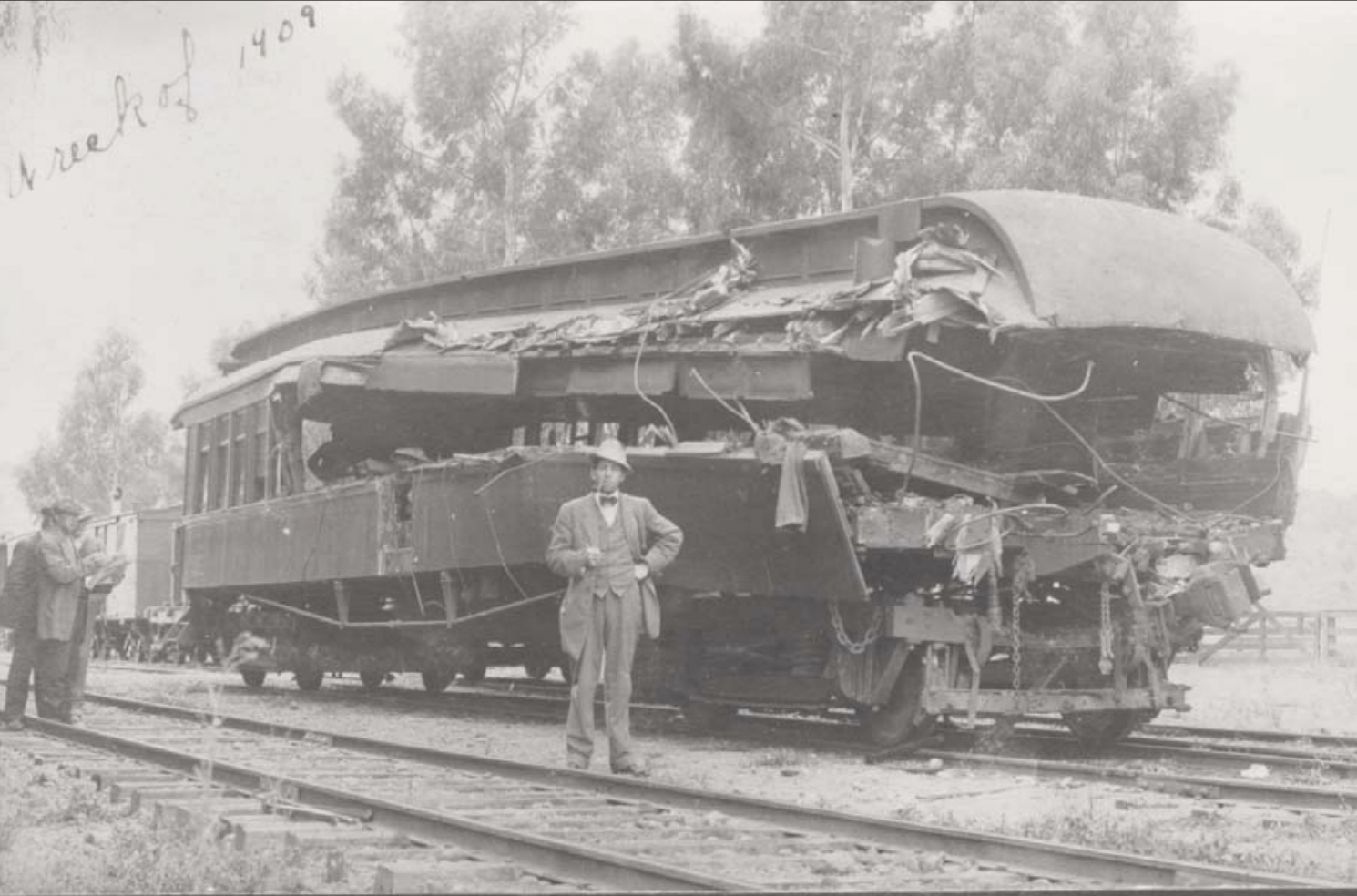
The smoking car after the crash

The baggage car and the smoking car telescoped, with the floor of the baggage car cutting through the seating area of the smoking car; but the other cars survived mostly unscathed. Following the crash, the telegraph at the Tiburon station immediately sent out the crash message. County physician Dr. John Henry Kuser was at the Novato train station just north of the crash, and upon hearing about, ran down the tracks to the wreck in 12 minutes. Upon a preliminary inspection, it was incorrectly determined that the engineer and fireman of the work train were dead. They both would end up being found alive and brought to the hospital. Due to the nature of the wreck, the aftermath was particularly gory – most people were instantly ripped in half, or into more pieces, and multiple people were beheaded. Conductor George Flaherty was discharged, and subsequently arrested.
