= Bhogaon, Jintur =

Village in Maharashtra

Bhogaon
- Village
- Location in Maharashtra, India Bhogaon (India)
- Coordinates: 19°35′22″N 76°45′39″E
- Country: India
- State: Maharashtra
- District: Parbhani

Government
  - Type: Gram panchayat

Population (2011)
  - Total: 5,881
- Demonym: Bhogaonkar

Languages
  - Official: Marathi
- Time zone: UTC+5:30 (IST)
- PIN: 431509
- Telephone code: 02457
- ISO 3166 code: IN-MH
- Vehicle registration: MH-22

Bhogaon is a major village in the Jintur taluka of Parbhani district in Maharashtra, a state of India.

== Demography ==
Bhogaon has a total of 1205 families residing in it. The village has a population of 5,881, of which 3,036 are males while 2,845 are females (as per Population Census 2011).

The Average Sex Ratio of is 937, which is higher than the Maharashtra state average of 929.

Bhogaon has a lower literacy rate compared to Maharashtra. In 2011, the literacy rate of Bhogaon was 74.07% compared to the 82.34% literacy rate of Maharashtra. In Bhogaon, male literacy stands at 84.02% while female literacy rate is 63.59%.

Schedule Caste (SC) constitutes 5.12%, while Schedule Tribe (ST) was 0.20% of the total population.

== Transport ==
Bhogaon is in vicinity of Jintur, it is located 46 km (29 mi) north from district headquarters, and 477 km (296 mi) from the state capital.

== Governance and Politics ==
Bhogaon comes under the Parbhani (Lok Sabha constituency) for Indian general elections. The current member of Parliament representing this constituency is Sanjay Haribhau Jadhav of Shiv Sena.

Bhogaon comes under the Jintur (Vidhan Sabha constituency) for the assembly elections of Maharashtra. The current representative from this constituency is Vijay Bhambale of Nationalist Congress Party.
