= Borgaon, Wardha =

Borgaon
- Village
- Location in Maharashtra, India
- Coordinates: 18°44′47″N 75°26′54″E
- Country: India
- State: Maharashtra
- District: Wardha
- Tahsil: Nagpur

Area
  - Total: 3.29 km^{2} (1.27 sq mi)

Population (2011)
  - Total: 869
  - Density: 264/km^{2} (684/sq mi)

Languages
  - Official: Marathi
- Time zone: UTC+5:30 (IST)
- PIN: 442001

Borgaon, Wardha is a village in Wardha district in the state of Maharashtra, India. Gram panchayat of Borgaon village is Borgaon S. It has a population of 869 peoples in a geographical area of 543.95 hectares.
