= Guyandotte River train wreck =

Train wreck in West Virginia

Coordinates: 38°25′17″N 82°23′26″W

Details
- Date: January 1, 1913; 113 years ago
- Location: West Virginia
- Country: United States
- Operator: Chesapeake and Ohio Railway
- Cause: bridge collapse

Statistics
- Trains: 1
- Deaths: 7

The Guyandotte River train wreck occurred on the morning of January 1, 1913, when the Chesapeake and Ohio Railway's (C&O) train No. 99, scheduled to run from Hinton, West Virginia, to Russell, Kentucky, and headed by Mikado locomotive 820, fell through a bridge over the Guyandotte River near Huntington, West Virginia while attempting to cross it. The accident killed seven people.

At approximately 11:00 AM, No. 99 approached the bridge and was stopped by a flagman protecting a bridgework crew that was unloading materials for repairs on it. In the meantime, Engineer E.B. "Shorty" Webber carried out maintenance on the locomotive while the fireman and front brakeman walked out on to the bridge to inspect the repairs and continued on to the opposite side.

After the flagman gave the all clear, Webber slowly started across the bridge with the intention on picking up the brakeman and fireman on the far side. Despite the ongoing repairs, the bridge had stayed open for several previous days under traffic with no problems. As 820 reached the middle of the bridge, the center span collapsed, plunging it into the river along with Webber and 13 bridge workers. Webber and six of the bridge workers were killed.

Rescuers saved the seven other bridge workers from the river. Thousands of people lined the river as rescue efforts went on. Eventually the bodies of Webber and bridge workers J.W. Crawford, Charles Maddy (found 50 miles downstream near Portsmouth, Ohio), and Emmett Wood were recovered. Remains of Bridge Workers Henry White; Charles Coyner and J.G Wheeler were lost. It was not until June 1913 that C&O was able to salvage the locomotive from the river.
