= Borgaon Manju =

- town
- Location in Maharashtra, India
- Coordinates: 20°43′10″N 77°9′10″E
- Country: India
- State: Maharashtra
- District: Akola

Government
  - Type: Gram Panchayat
  - Body: 17 members
- Elevation: 299 m (981 ft)

Languages
  - Official: Marathi
- Time zone: UTC+5:30 (IST)
- PIN: 444 102
- Vehicle registration: MH-30

Borgaon Manju is a town in the Akola district in Amravati division of Vidarbha region of Maharashtra state in India. It is located on National Highway 6 running between Murtizapur and Akola. It is 20 km to the east of Akola.

The Digambar Jain Temple is located at the centre of the town, which attracts the devotees with the ancient idols of 23rd Tirthankar Lord Neminath and other Bhagwan's idols, and jama masjid in patel chowk.
