= Newfoundland dog =

Dog breed

Newfoundland
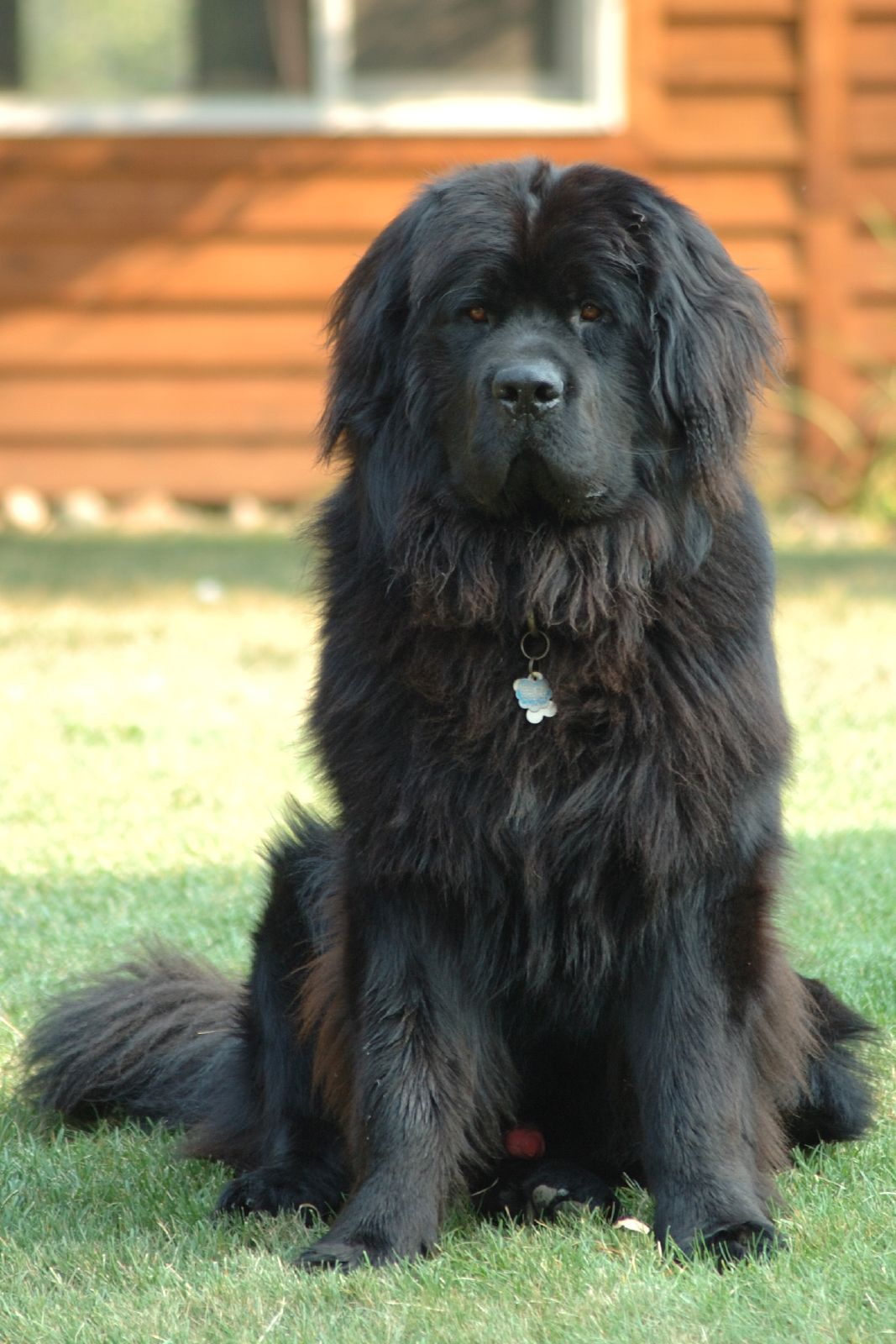
- Newfoundland
- Common nicknames: Newf, Newfie
- Origin: Island of Newfoundland, modern-day Canada
Traits
Height	Males	71 cm (28 in)
	Females	66 cm (26 in)
Weight	Males	65–80 kg (143–176 lb)
	Females	55–65 kg (121–143 lb)
- Coat: Thick and straight
- Colour: Black, white with black patches ("Landseer"), brown (not in Canadian standard), and grey (only in US standard, not recognized by other standards)
- Litter size: 4–12 pups
Kennel club standards
- Fédération Cynologique Internationale: standard
- Notes: Provincial mammal of Newfoundland

The Newfoundland is a large breed of working dog. They can be black, grey, brown, or black and white. However, in the Dominion of Newfoundland, before it became part of Canada, only black and Landseer (white-and-black) coloured dogs were considered to be proper members of the breed. They were originally bred and used as working dogs for fishermen in Newfoundland.

They excel at water rescue and lifesaving, because of their muscular build, thick double coat, webbed paws, and swimming abilities.

== Description ==
=== Appearance ===
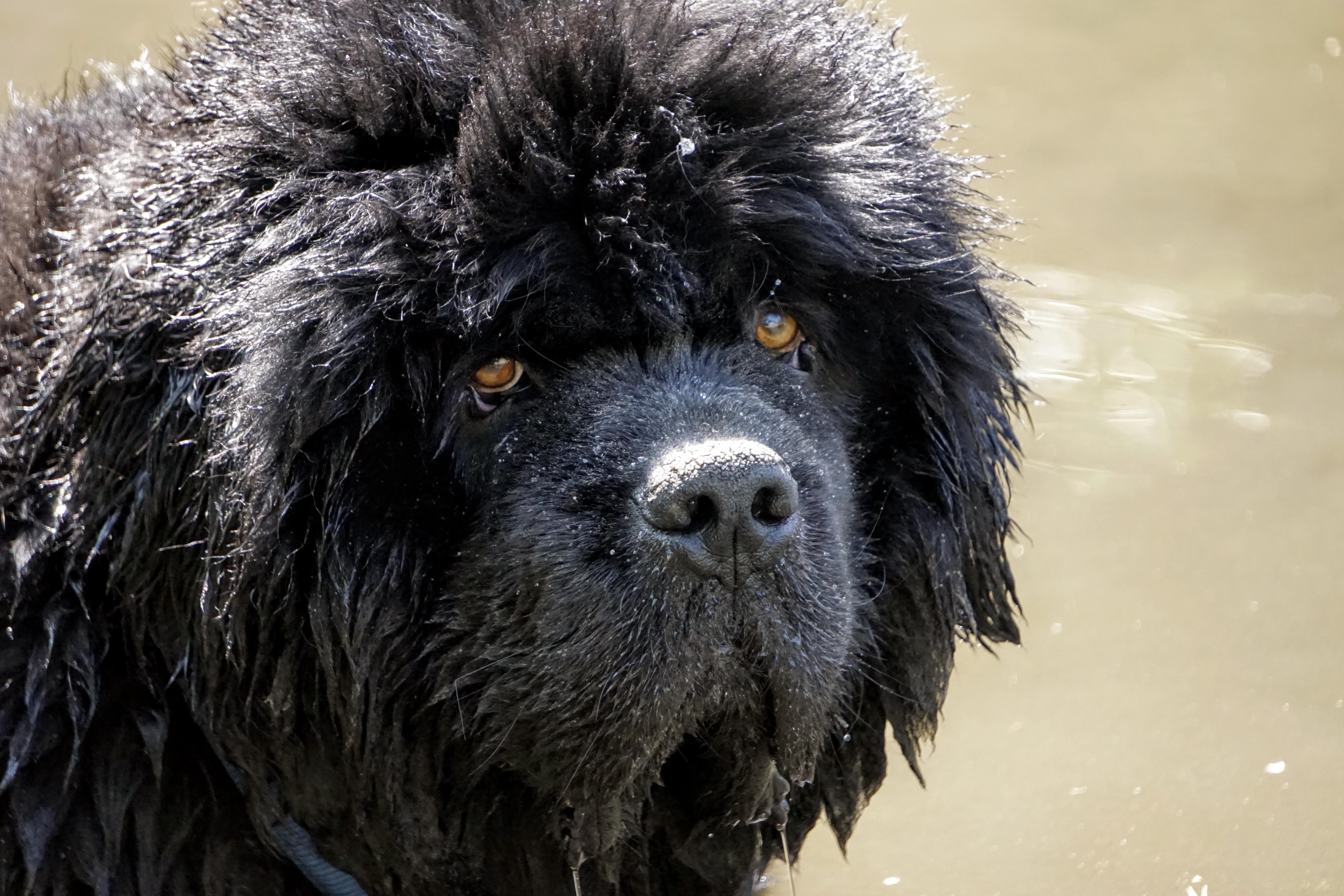
Newfoundlands typically have dark brown eyes, but lighter eye colors are common for the brown or grey coated

Newfoundlands ('Newfs' or 'Newfies') have webbed paws and a double coat that consists of dense soft fur that keeps them warm, and a water-resistant, coarse, moderately long, outer coat. Males normally weigh 65–80 kg (143–176 lb), and females 55–65 kg (121–143 lb), placing them in the "Giant" weight range. Some Newfoundlands have been known to weigh over 90 kg (200 lb). They may grow up to 56–76 cm (22–30 in) tall at the shoulder.

The American Kennel Club (AKC) standard colours of the Newfoundland are black, brown, grey, and white-and-black (sometimes referred to as a Landseer). Other colours are possible but are not considered rare or more valuable. The Kennel Club (KC) and FCI permit only black, brown, and white/black; the Canadian Kennel Club (CKC) permits only black and white/black, though recessive brown and white/brown also occur but cannot be shown. The "Landseer" pattern is named after the artist Sir Edwin Henry Landseer, who featured them in many of his paintings. The Fédération Cynologique Internationale (FCI) ECT Landseer ("European Continental Type") is a separate breed created in Germany and Switzerland from cross-breeding Landseer-coloured Newfoundlands with livestock guardian breeds. It is a taller, more narrow white dog with black markings bred as a companion and guard dog.

The breed's size and heavy musculature give it the strength it needs to work in rough water. Its dense double coat with oily, and water-resistant outer guard hairs insulate it in cold waters.

== Health ==
A 2024 UK study found a life expectancy of 11 years for the breed compared to an average of 12.7 for purebreeds and 12 for crossbreeds. A 2005 Swedish study of insurance data found 62% of Newfoundland dogs died by the age of 10, higher than the overall rate of 35% of dogs dying by the age of 10.

Several conditions the Newfoundland is predisposed to include: acral lick dermatitis, allergic skin disease, hypothyroidism, ichthyosis, and primary seborrhoea.

A study of referrals to a veterinary clinic in the US found the Newfoundland to be predisposed to dilated cardiomyopathy, with 1.3% of dogs having the condition. A Swedish study found 16% of Newfoundlands with DCM to have ventricular ectopy. An English study found 77% of Newfoundlands with DCM to have atrial fibrillation.

An American study reviewing over a million cases presented to 27 veterinary teaching hospitals in North America found the Newfoundland to be the most prediposed to canine hip dysplasia, with 17.16% of dogs having the condition compared to 3.52% overall. This same study found the Newfoundland to also have the highest prevalence of cranial cruciate ligament deficiency (CCLD) with 8.9% of dogs having the condition compared to an overall rate of 2.55%. For dogs diagnosed with both conditions the Newfoundland once again had the highest prevalence with 2.86% having both hip dysplasia and CCLD compared to 0.3% overall. Another American study of over a million and a quarter of a million hip and elbow evaluation records in dogs over the age of 2 years found a prevalence of 24.8% for hip dysplasia, the highest in the study, and 22.7% for elbow dysplasia.

The Newfoundland is predisposed to gastric dilation volvulus (GDV). In a survey of breed club members in the UK it was found that 10% of Newfoundland deaths were due to GDV compared to the overall rate of 2.5%, although the study reported bias due to its voluntary nature and small sample size.

== History ==
=== Origin ===
Genomic analysis indicates that Newfoundlands are related to the Irish Water Spaniel, Labrador Retriever, and Curly-Coated Retriever.

The Newfoundland was originally bred and used as a working dog for fishermen in Newfoundland.

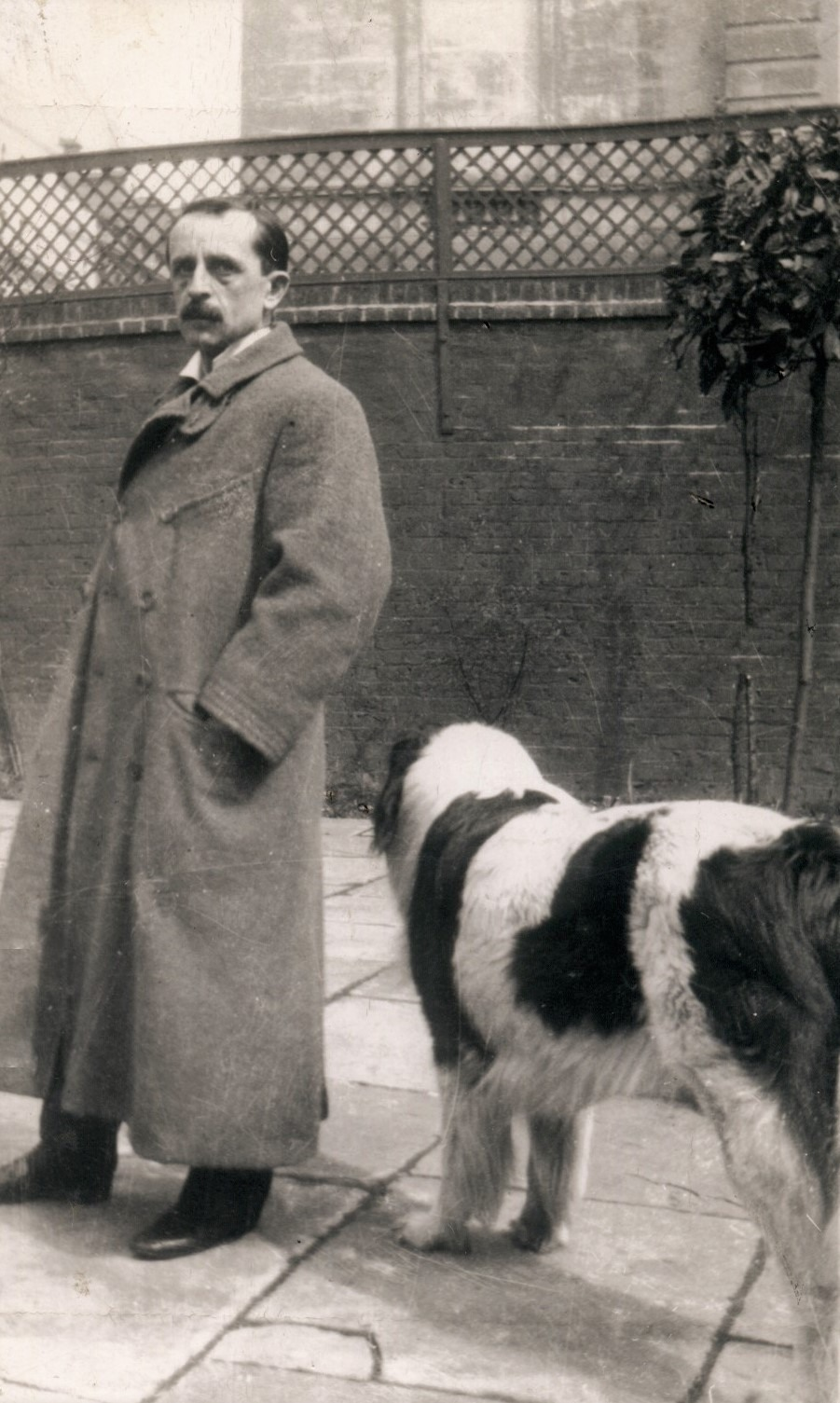
J. M. Barrie with his Newfoundland dog Luath, model of Nana

The Oxford English Dictionary attests "Newfoundland dog" to as early as 1766, when the breed is mentioned in the journal of Joseph Banks.

In the early 1880s, fishermen and explorers from Ireland and England travelled to the Grand Banks of Newfoundland, where they described two types of working dogs. One was heavily built, large with a longish coat, and the other medium-sized in build – an active, smooth-coated water dog. The heavier breed was known as the greater Newfoundland, or Newfoundland. The smaller breed was known as the lesser Newfoundland, or St. John's water dog. The St. John's water dog became the founding breed of modern retrievers. Both breeds were used as working dogs to pull fishnets, with the Greater Newfoundland also being used to haul carts and other equipment.

It has been proposed that the original Newfoundland that lived on the island was smaller; in theory, the smaller landrace was bred with mastiffs when sold to the English, and the English version was popularized as the modern Newfoundland.

=== Reputation ===
The breed's working role was varied. Many tales have been told of the courage displayed by Newfoundlands in adventuring and lifesaving exploits. Over the last two centuries, this has inspired a number of artists, who have portrayed the dogs in paint, stone, bronze, and porcelain. One famous Newfoundland was named Seaman, one of the most traveled dogs in human history, who accompanied American explorers Lewis and Clark on their expedition from the Mississippi to the Pacific and back, a journey that took three years. A statue of him is included in many Lewis and Clark monuments. Many children's books have been written about Seaman.

The breed prospered in the United Kingdom, until 1914 and again in 1939, when its numbers were almost fatally depleted by wartime restrictions. Since the 1950s there has been a steady increase in numbers and popularity, despite the fact that the Newfoundland's great size and fondness for mud and water makes it unsuitable as a pet for many households.

=== Water rescue ===
Kennel clubs across the United States host Newfoundland Rescue Demonstrations, as well as offering classes in the field.

- In 1828, Ann Harvey of Isle aux Morts, her father, her brother, and a Newfoundland named Hairyman saved over 160 Irish immigrants from the wreck of the brig Despatch.
- In 1881 in Melbourne, Australia, a Newfoundland named Nelson helped rescue Thomas Brown, a cab driver who was swept away by flood waters in Swanston Street on the night of November 15. Nelson's copper dog collar—engraved with his name—survived. It was acquired by the National Museum of Australia and became part of the National Historical Collection 130 years after the rescue.
- In the early 20th century, a dog that is thought to have been a Newfoundland saved 92 people who were on the SS Ethie which wrecked off of the Northern Peninsula of Newfoundland during a blizzard. The dog retrieved a rope thrown out into the turbulent waters by those on deck, and brought the rope to shore to people waiting on the beach. A breeches buoy was attached to the rope, and all those aboard the ship were able to get across to the shore including an infant in a mailbag. Wreckage of the ship can still be seen in Gros Morne National Park. E. J. Pratt's poem "Carlo", in the November 1920 issue of the Canadian Forum, commemorates this dog.
- In 1995, a 10-month-old Newfoundland named Boo saved a hearing-impaired man from drowning in the Yuba River in Northern California. The man fell into the river while dredging for gold. Boo noticed the struggling man as he and his owner were walking along the river. The Newfoundland instinctively dove into the river, took the drowning man by the arm, and brought him to safety. According to Janice Anderson, the Newfoundland's breeder, Boo had received no formal training in water rescue.

Further evidence of Newfoundlands' ability to rescue or support life-saving activities was cited in a 2007 article by the BBC. The breed continues in that role today, along with the Leonberger, Labrador Retriever and Golden Retriever dogs; they are used at the Italian School of Water Rescue Dogs, Scuola Italiana Cani Salvataggio, SICS, founded by Ferruccio Pilenga.

=== Relationship to other breeds ===
The Newfoundland shares many physical traits with mastiffs and Molosser-type dogs, such as the St. Bernard and English Mastiff, including stout legs, massive heads with very broad snouts, a thick bull-like neck, and a very sturdy bone structure. Many St. Bernards have Newfoundlands in their ancestry. Newfoundlands were brought and introduced to the St. Bernard breed in the 18th century when the population was threatened by an epidemic of canine distemper. They share many characteristics of many livestock guardian dog breeds, such as the Great Pyrenees.

Because of their strength, Newfoundlands were part of the foundation stock of the Leonberger (which excelled at water rescue and was imported by the Canadian government for that purpose); and the extinct Moscow Water Dog, a failed attempt at creating a lifesaving dog by the Russian state kennel—the unfortunate outcross with the Caucasian Shepherd Dog begat a dog more adept at biting than rescuing.

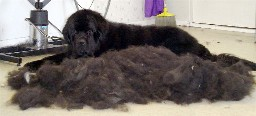
A Newfoundland lying next to its combed-out seasonal undercoat

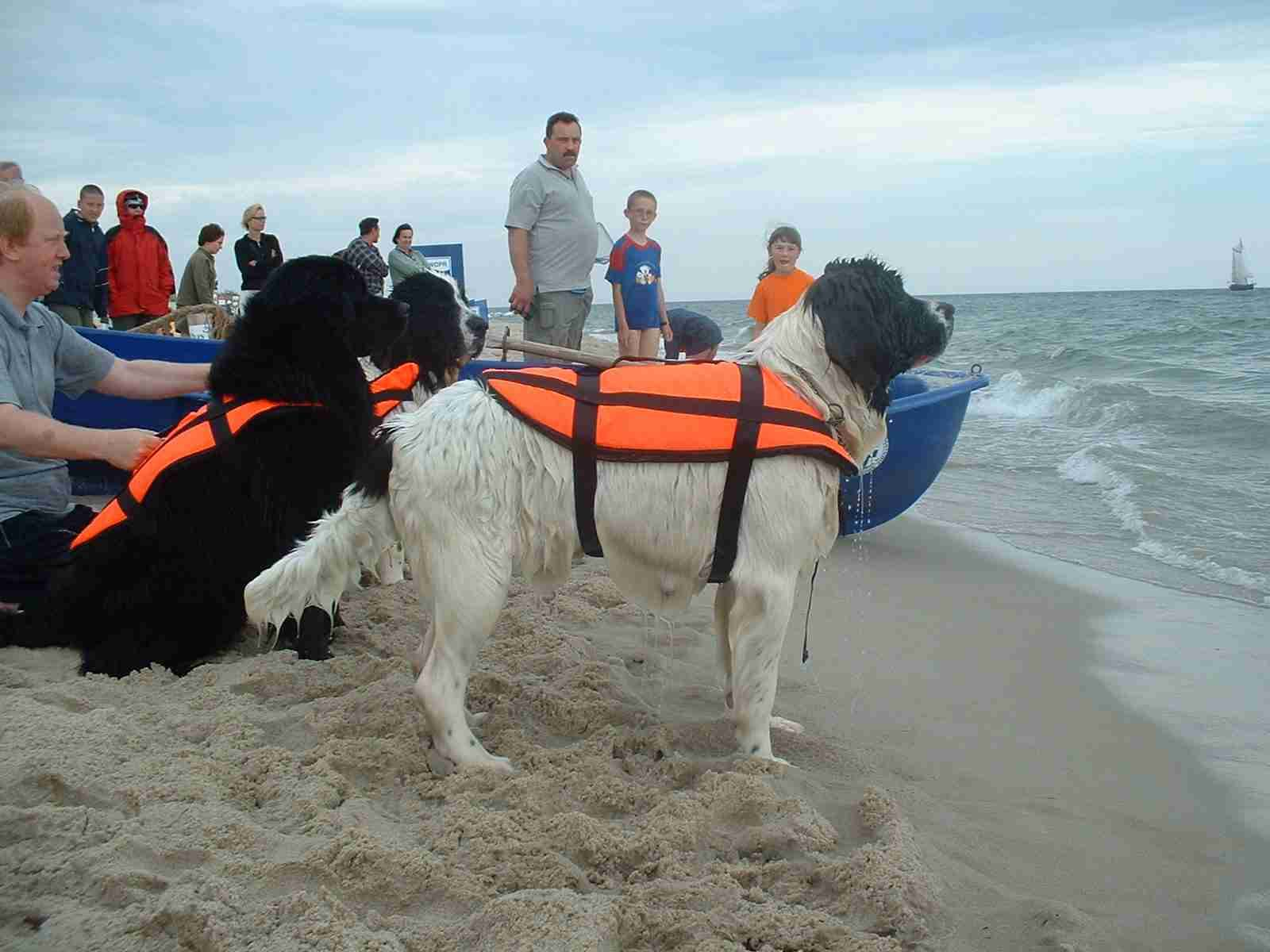
Many tales have been told of the courage displayed by Newfoundlands in adventuring and lifesaving exploits.

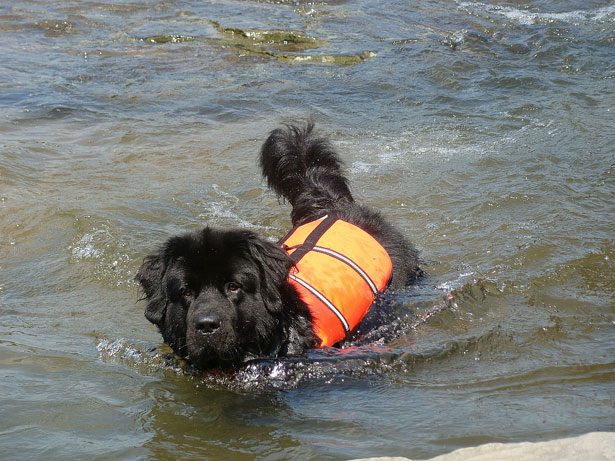
A Newfoundland river rescue unit's dog in action

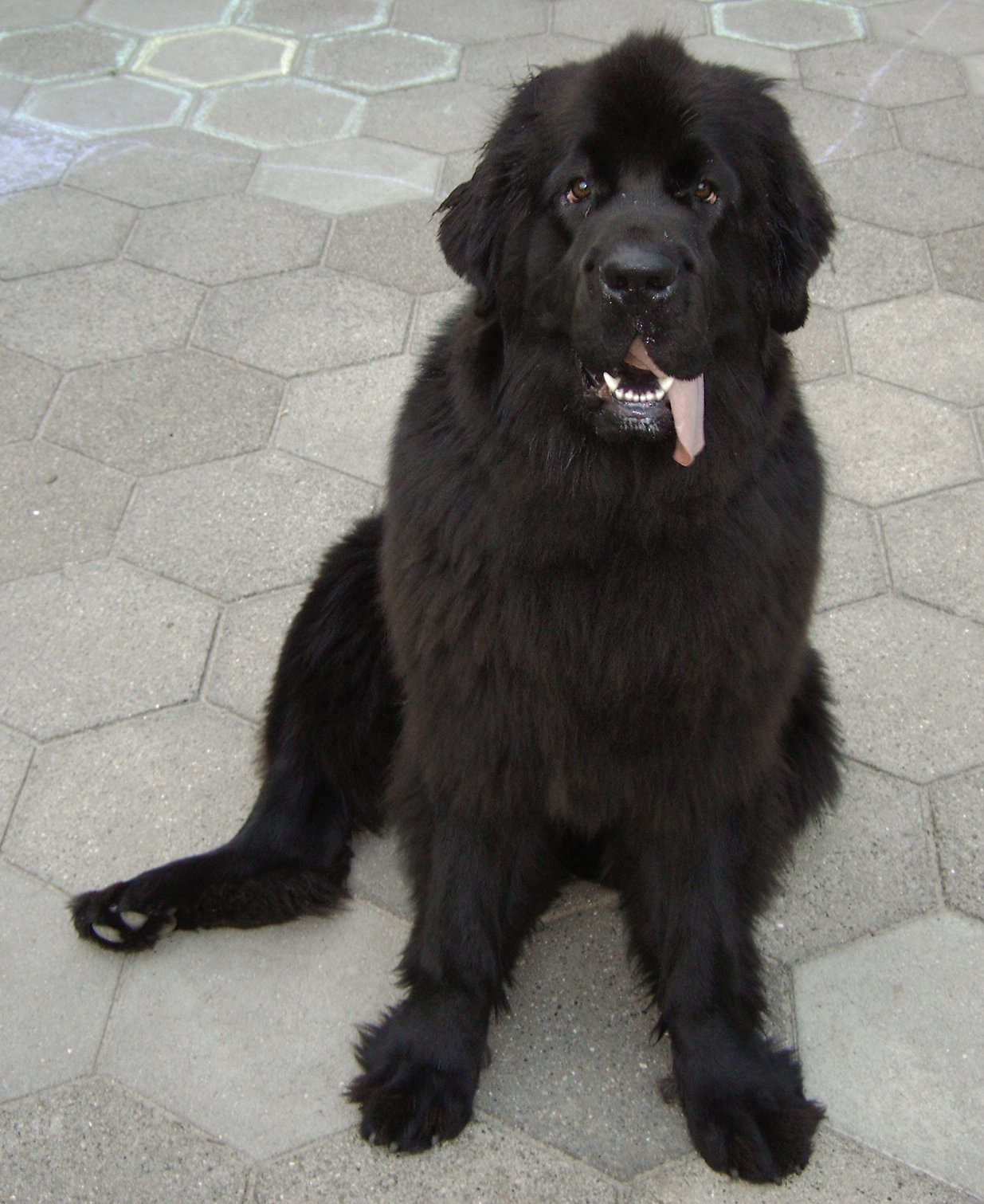
Many Newfoundlands are known to drool in excess, especially in warmer climates or on hot days

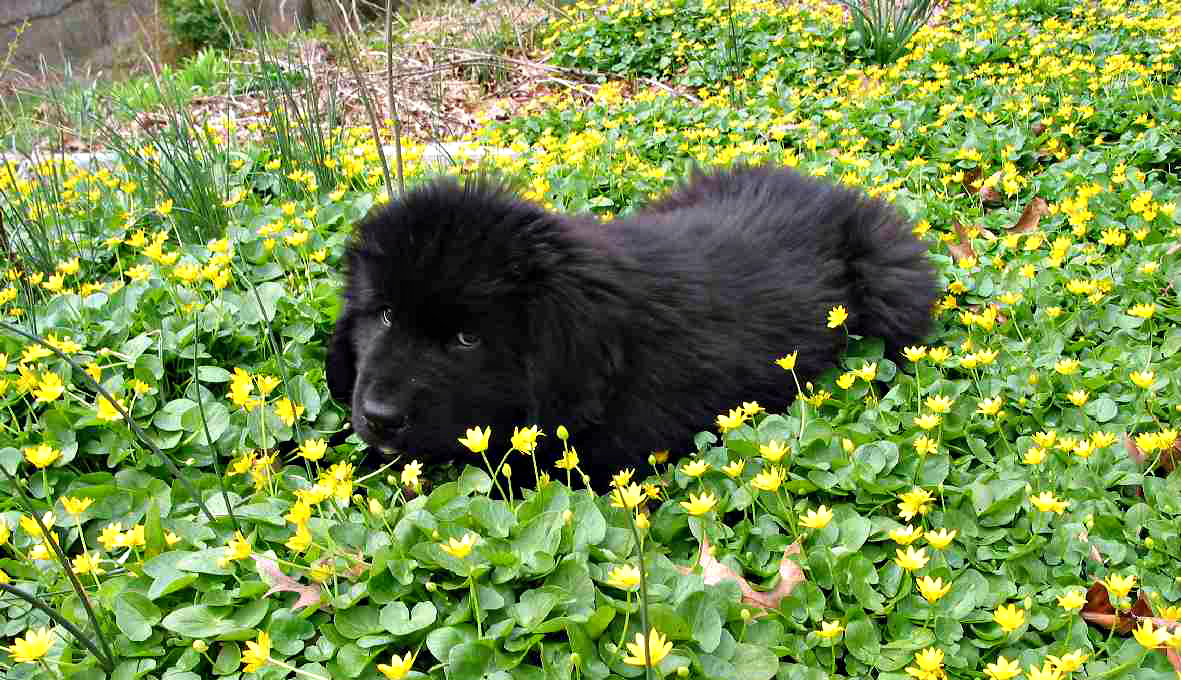
An eight-week-old Newfoundland puppy

Napoleon the Wonder Dog with his Master, G. Van Hare, performing in Van Hare's Magic Circus, London, 1862

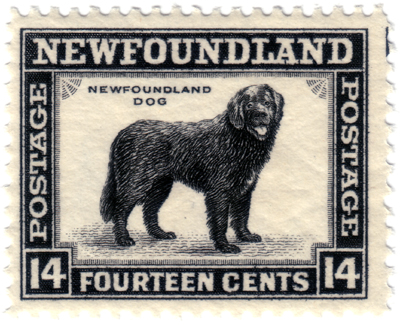
A Newfoundland stamp

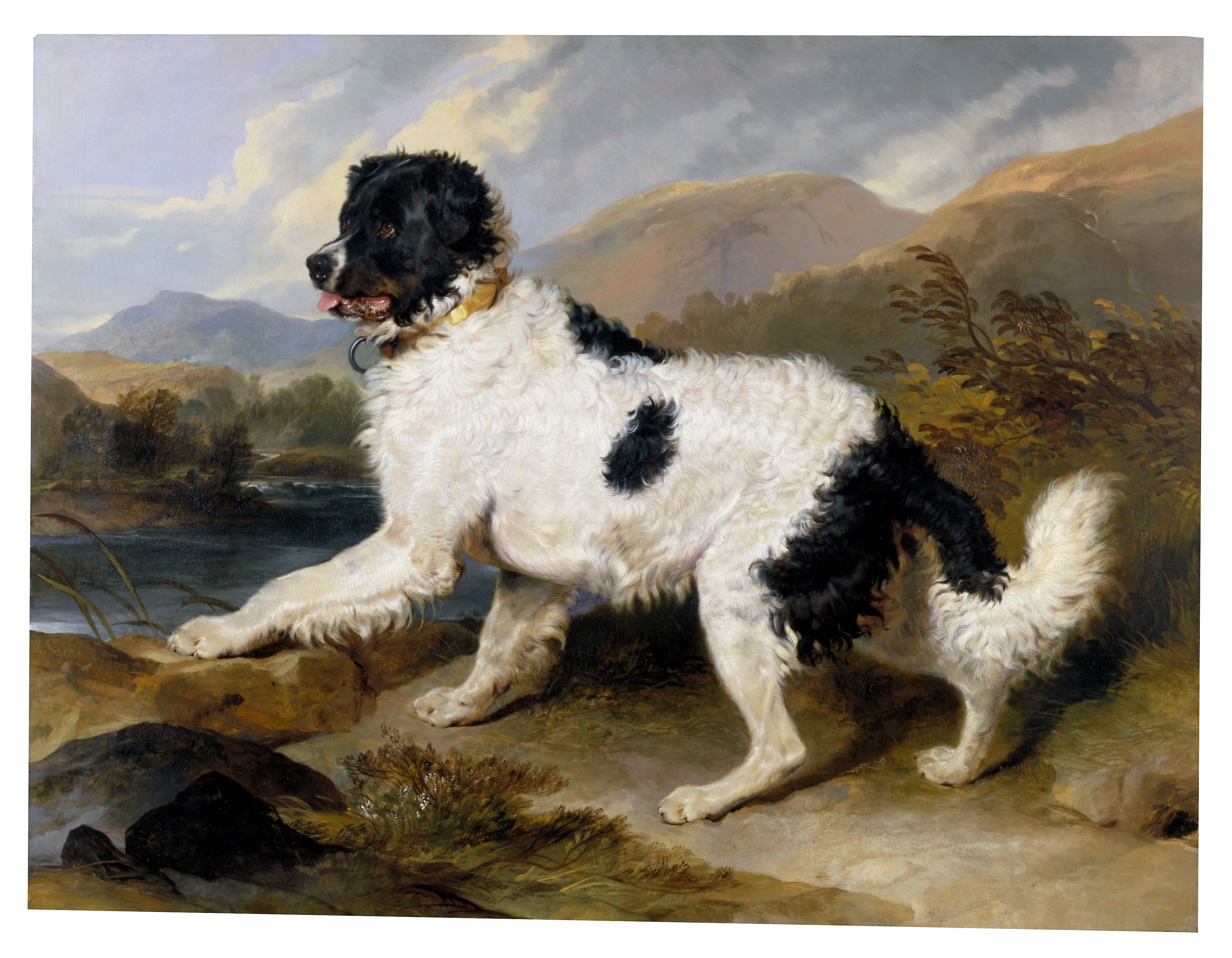
The classic "Landseer" markings of the breed relate to paintings like this by Sir Edwin Henry Landseer: Lion, a Newfoundland Dog, 1824. Some people believe that these markings are indicative of a separate breed known as the Landseer, named in his honour.

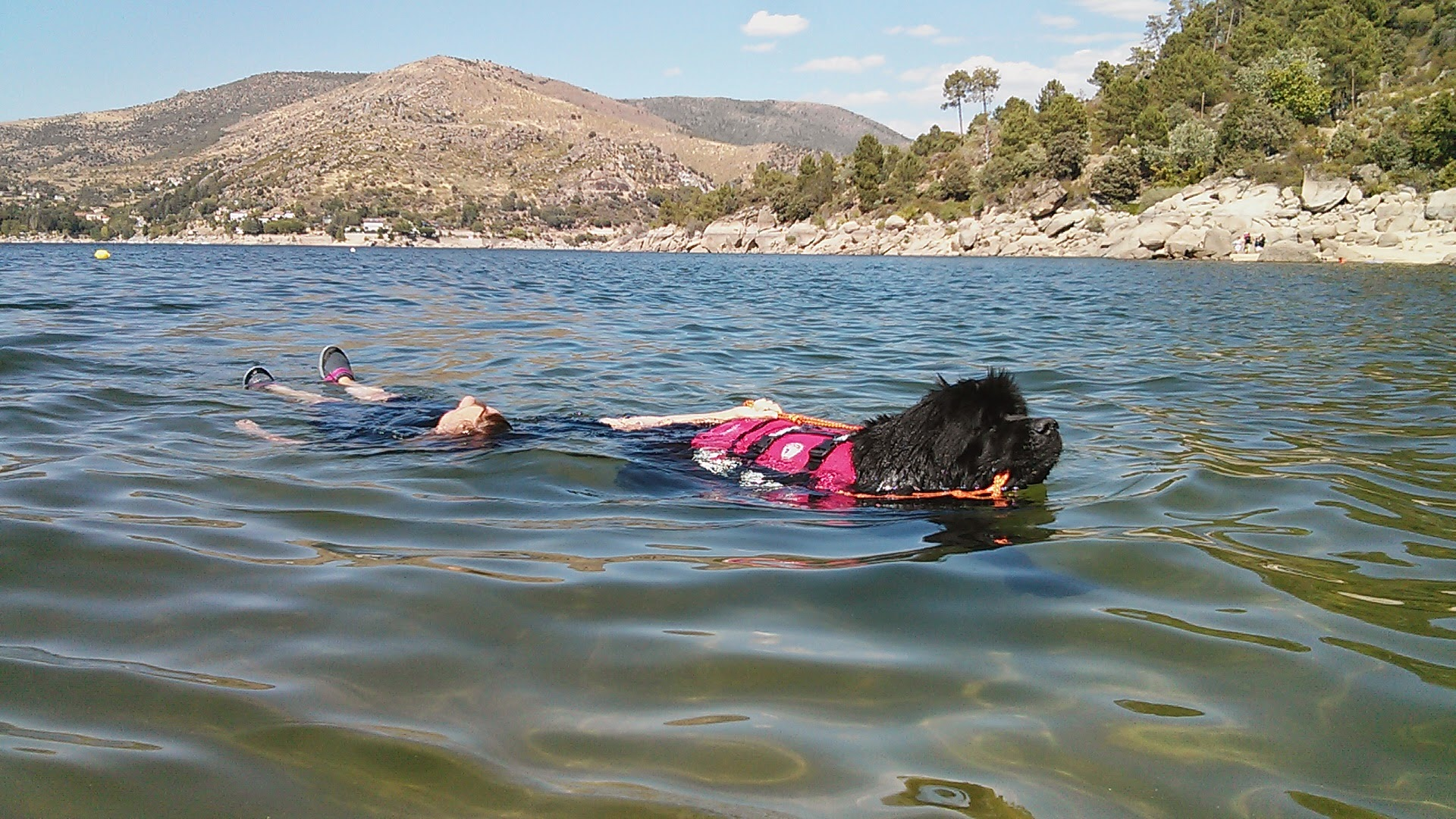
Newfoundland dogs, such as this one named "Dragon", have the natural instinct of pulling people out of the water without having undergone training.

== Famous Newfoundlands ==
=== Napoleon the Wonder Dog ===
A famous all-black Newfoundland performed as the star attraction in Van Hare's Magic Circus from 1862 and for many years thereafter in one of England's founding circus acts, traveling throughout Europe. The circus dog was known as the "Thousand Guinea Dog Napoleon" or "Napoleon the Wonder Dog". The circus owner, G. Van Hare, trained other Newfoundland dogs to perform a steeplechase routine with baboons dressed up as jockeys to ride them. Nonetheless, his "wizard dog" Napoleon was his favourite and held a special position in the Magic Circus. Napoleon would compete at jumping against human rivals, leaping over horses from a springboard, and dancing to music.

Napoleon the Wonder Dog became a wildly popular act in London from his debut at the Pavilion Theatre on April 4, 1862, and onward until his untimely death many years later when he slipped and fell during a circus practice session. At the peak of his fame, his performance was described in London's Illustrated Sporting News and Theatrical and Musical Review as follows: "Synopsis of his entertainment:— He spells his own name with letters, also that of the Prince of Wales; and when he is asked what he would say of her Most Gracious Majesty, he puts down letters to form 'God save the Queen.' He plays any gentleman a game of cards and performs the celebrated three-card trick upon which his master backs him at 100 to 1. Also 'The Disappearance,' a la Robin. He performs in a circus the same as a trick horse, en liberté, giving the Spanish trot to music, also leaping over bars, through balloons, with numerous other tricks of a most interesting character."

When Napoleon the Wonder Dog died at the age of 12 years old, his death was announced in a number of British newspapers, including the Sheffield Daily Telegraph, which mentioned the loss on May 5, 1868, as follows: "DEATH OF A CELEBRATED FOUR-FOOTED ARTISTE. — Mr. Van Hare's renowned dog, Napoleon, designated 'The Wizard Dog,' died on 24th ult., aged twelve years. He was a noble specimen of the Newfoundland breed (weighing near 200 lbs.) for which he took the prize at the first Agricultural Hall Dog Show. Besides his magnificent appearance and symmetry, he was the most extraordinary sagacious and highly-trained animal ever known. He is now being preserved and beautifully mounted by the celebrated naturalist, Mr. Edwin Ward. — Era."

=== Other famous Newfoundlands ===
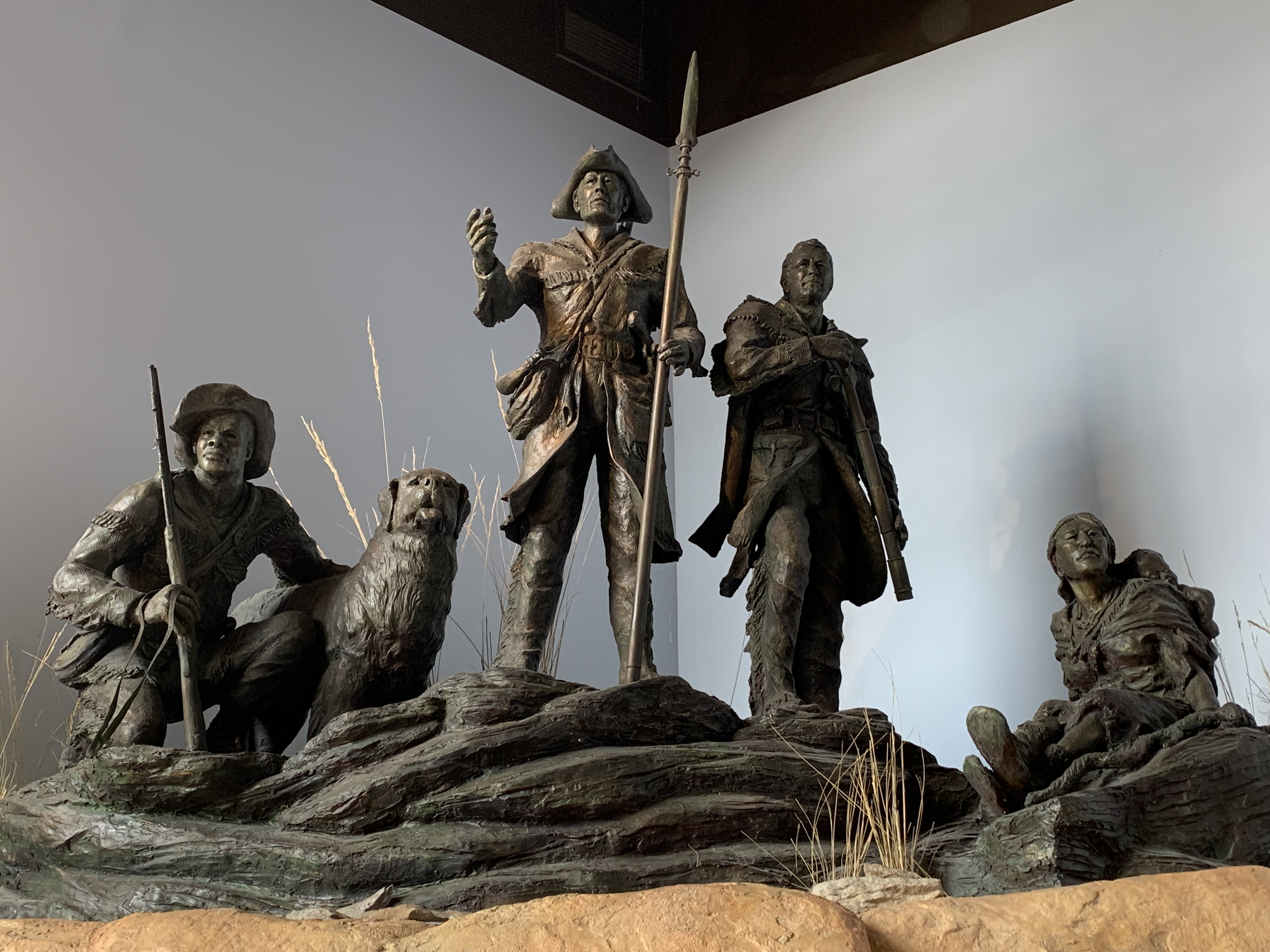
Left to right, York, Seaman, Lewis, Clark, Sacagawea, and her baby Pompey. Statue by Robert Scriver, in the Lewis and Clark National Historic Interpretative Center, Great Falls, Montana.

- Bashaw (Matthew Cotes Wyatt): the Earl of Dudley's favourite dog, and the inspiration for a sculpture by Matthew Cotes Wyatt at the Victoria and Albert Museum in London
- Bilbo: a lifeguard Newfoundland on Sennen beach in Cornwall—credited with saving three lives
- Boatswain: pet of English poet Lord Byron and the subject of his poem "Epitaph to a Dog". Byron attempted to nurse Boatswain back to health when the dog contracted rabies, but was unsuccessful. When Boatswain died, Byron constructed a monument for him at Newstead Abbey.
- Bouncer: presented by the children of Newfoundland, with a dog-cart, as a gift to the Duke and Duchess of Cornwall and York (later George V and Queen Mary), during their visit to the colony in 1901
- Frank: unofficial mascot of the Orphan Brigade during the American Civil War
- Gander: the World War II mascot of the Royal Rifles of Canada, also known as "Sergeant Gander", which was killed in action at the Battle of Hong Kong when he carried a grenade away from wounded soldiers. For this, he was awarded the PDSA Dickin Medal retroactively in 2000. A memorial statue can be viewed at the Gander Heritage Memorial Park (Gander, NL).
- Gipsy: Lemuel and Emma Wilmarth's dog which saved the latter from drowning, lived to be 23 years old, and inspired a poem by ASPCA founder Henry Bergh.
- Luath: J. M. Barrie's Landseer Newfoundland and the inspiration for "Nana," the Darling children's nurse in Peter Pan.
- Neptune: old Newfoundland dog gifted by Jane Franklin to her husband Sir John Franklin for Franklin's lost expedition. Inuit accounts suggest the dog was alive and hunting caribou with the last survivors in the 1850s, years after the expedition was last seen by Europeans.
- Rigel: claimed pet of first officer William Murdoch aboard the RMS Titanic. Murdoch went down with the ship, but Rigel swam for three hours next to a lifeboat until it was rescued by the RMS Carpathia. Rigel is renowned as a hero alerting the Carpathia's captain of the weakened survivors before the ship hit them. Rigel was adopted by crewman Jonas Briggs. Its existence and the story has been dismissed as a hoax.
- Sable Chief: World War I mascot of the Royal Newfoundland Regiment
- Seaman: his name once misread as Scannon, this dog travelled with the Lewis and Clark Expedition from the Mississippi to the Pacific Ocean and back, a three-year trip (1804 to 1806). His collar tag, since lost but once in a museum, read:
The greatest traveller of my species.
My name is SEAMAN,
the dog of captain Meriwether Lewis,
whom I accompanied to the Pacifick [sic] ocean
through the interior of the continent of North America
- Swansea Jack: famous Welsh rescue dog identified as a Newfoundland, but which had an appearance more like a modern-day Flat-Coated Retriever

== Gallery ==
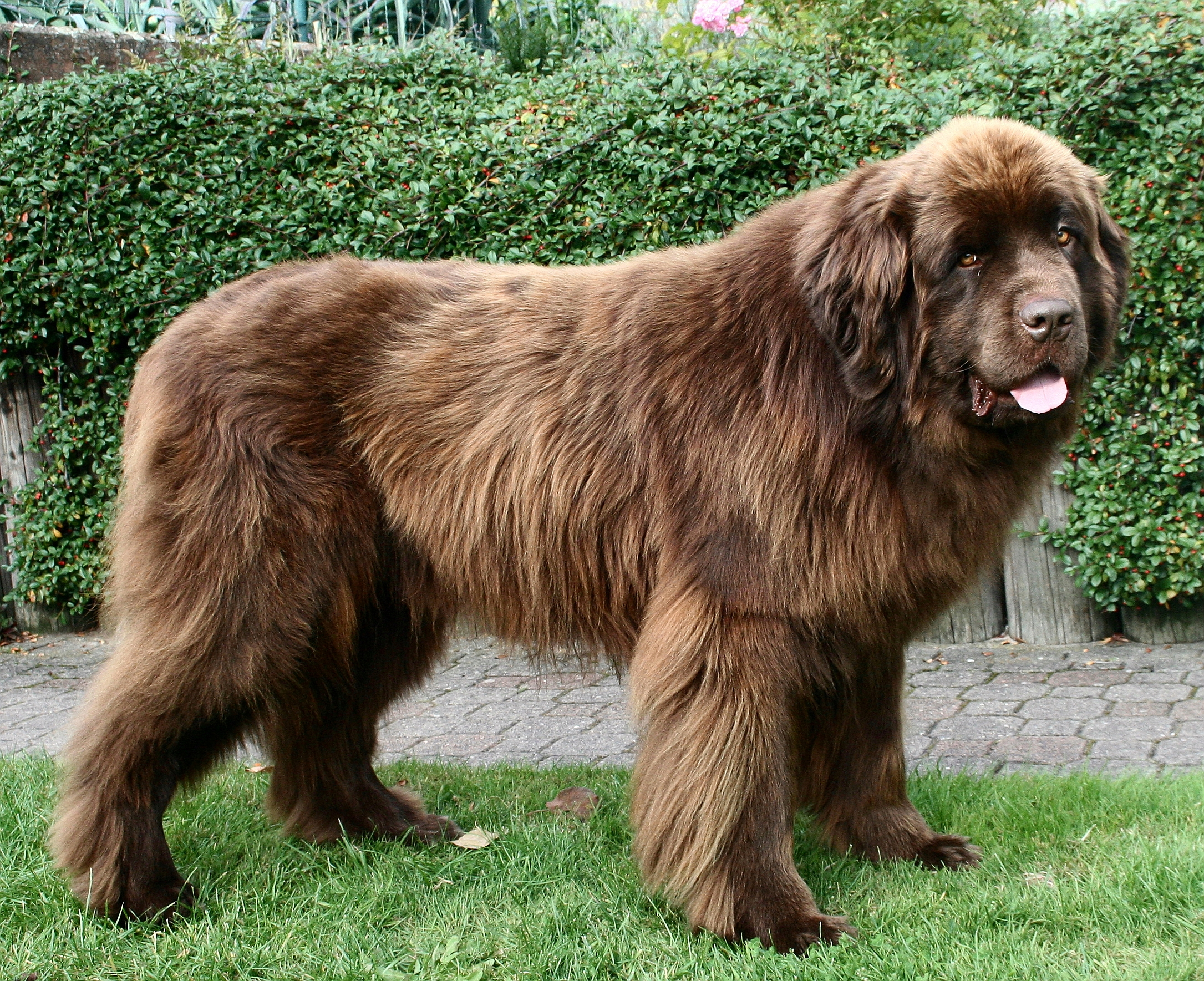
A brown Newfoundland

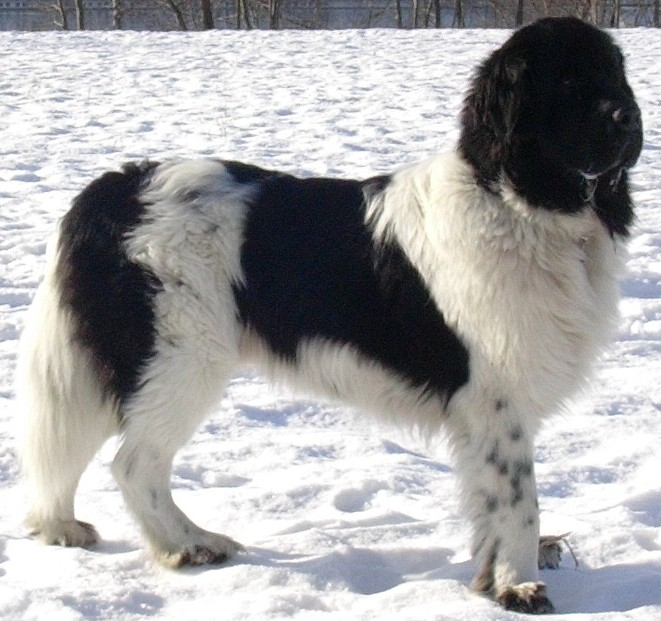
A Landseer

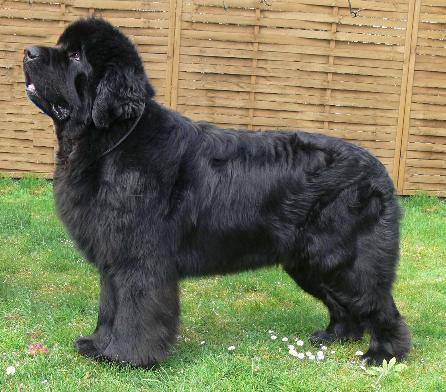
A black Newfoundland

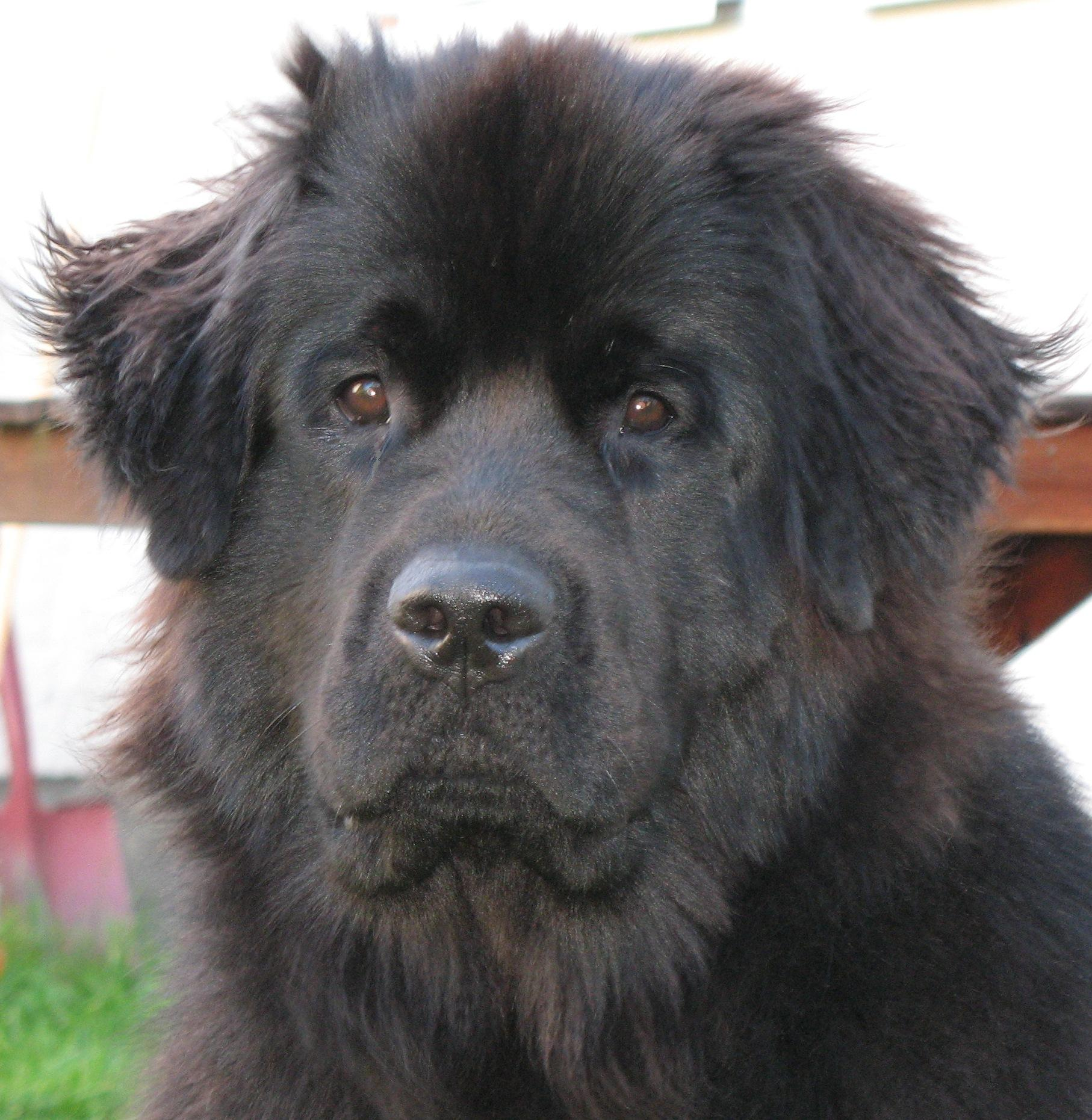
A Newfoundland portrait

== See also ==
- List of dog breeds
