= Ann Harvey =

Canadian fisher and rescuer (1811–1860)

- Born: 1811; Near Isle aux Morts, Newfoundland
- Died: 1860 (aged 48–49); Port aux Basques, Newfoundland
- Occupations: Fisherwoman, rescuer

Ann Harvey (1811–1860) was a fisher and rescuer born near the small fishing community of Isle aux Morts, Newfoundland. Harvey, called the "Grace Darling of Newfoundland", is known for her bravery at the age of seventeen for rescuing, along with her father, younger brother and their Newfoundland dog, 163 shipwrecked people from the brig Despatch between July 12–15, 1828. Despatch had departed from Derry in late May, carrying nearly 200 Irish immigrants (and 11 crew members) bound for Quebec City, but on July 10, a fierce storm wrecked the brig on the rocks near Isle aux Morts.

== Biography ==
The Harveys lived, along with one or two other families, on a small, bare, rocky island near Isle aux Morts. Ann's father, George, was born in Jersey, and moved to Newfoundland with his wife, where they had eight children, of whom Ann was the eldest. Ann married Charles Gillam and together they had eight children.

=== 1828 rescue ===
Ann and her father were fishing as usual one early July morning in 1828 when she sighted a keg and a straw bed floating in the turbulent seas. They immediately realized a ship had been wrecked nearby. They fetched twelve-year-old Tom, George's oldest son, and their Newfoundland dog, Hairy Man, and launched their punt. On a beach nearby they found six men who had survived the wreck and set out to find more survivors. They found a large group on a tiny island that would be thereafter known as Wreck Rock. This rock, three miles from shore, was barely large enough to hold the remaining survivors; thirty or more had died from exhaustion or washed away and drowned. They had gotten to this small rock by means of a mast they had cut away from the sinking vessel. George could get no closer than 100 feet of them due to the heavy seas. He threw a billet of wood to which the survivors attached a rope and George got his dog to swim for it. Each person was taken off the rock in this fashion.

Fourteen people died on the rock, two aboard the boats, and ten more expired on land after their dramatic rescue. The waves remained merciless the entire time; two babies were swept from their mothers' arms. But from Sunday morning to Tuesday morning, 163 people were saved.

It was a challenge to feed the rescued, given their large numbers and the limited supplies the tiny community had available. The nearest merchants were many miles away in Jersey Harbour and Harbour Breton. Although Ann and her family did their best to feed and care for the survivors in the intervening days, the would-be immigrants were in a pitiful condition. There were few homes on Dead Island, so the Harveys and some of the survivors built lean-tos for shelter.

When Captain Grant of HMS Tyne arrived about eight days later, after receiving word of the wreck, they found no bread, flour or tea left in the Harvey home, their winter provisions all gone. Grant replenished the food stocks of the Harveys and removed the survivors to Halifax, where news of the heroism of Ann and her father travelled throughout the island. From Government House, Governor Thomas Cochrane applied to the Royal Humane Society for recognition of the family and a special medal was struck. Lloyd's of London, the insurance agents, gave the Harveys the then princely sum of 100 pounds.

Ann's days as a rescuer were not over; ten years later on September 4, 1838, Rankin was sailing from Glasgow to Quebec and went aground near the same spot as Despatch. This time, she helped save the lives of twenty-five people.

For a time, Ann was known as the 'Grace Darling of Newfoundland', after the Englishwoman who, with her father, saved seamen wrecked on the Northumberland coast in 1838.

=== Death and recognition ===
Ann died in Port aux Basques in 1860. She was 49 years old.

On July 17, 1987, the Canadian Coast Guard Ship Ann Harvey was commissioned in memory of Ann's heroic deeds. There is a hiking trail and an annual festival, Ann Harvey Days, named for her. In 2006, composer Stephen Hatfield wrote a chamber opera about Harvey, Ann and Séamus, based on a novel of the same name by Kevin Major.
