= Xantippe Saunders =

American portrait painter and art teacher

- Born: Mary Ann Xantippe Saunders; January 1, 1838; Columbia, Kentucky, U.S.
- Died: December 4, 1922 (aged 84); Louisville, Kentucky, U.S.
- Resting place: Cave Hill Cemetery; Louisville, Kentucky, U.S.
- Education: Greenville Institute
- Occupations: Artist, teacher
- Relatives: Mark Twain (cousin)

Mary Ann Xantippe "Tip" Saunders (January 1, 1838 – December 4, 1922) was an American portrait painter and art teacher.

She studied art under Cornelius Pering, and became friends with his daughter Cornelia Pering, also an artist. In New York, she studied under Lemuel Wilmarth and in the studio of Joseph Oriel Eaton. She and Cornelia Pering started the Pering and Saunders Art School in Louisville, which they ran from the 1890s until World War I.

In 1856, Saunders graduated cum laude at Greenville Institute at Harrodsburg, Kentucky. She was popular through her young adulthood. During the American Civil War, her betrothed was killed in action. After the Civil War, she studied art in earnest, both under Cornelius Pering and at the Cooper Union Academy of Design, focusing on portrait painting. She then returned to Louisville, Kentucky, to teach art.

Saunders was a cousin of Mark Twain, and painted a famous portrait of him in 1873.

Xantippe Saunders died on December 4, 1922, and is interred in Cave Hill Cemetery in Louisville.
