= Gipsy (dog) =

Long-lived Newfoundland dog

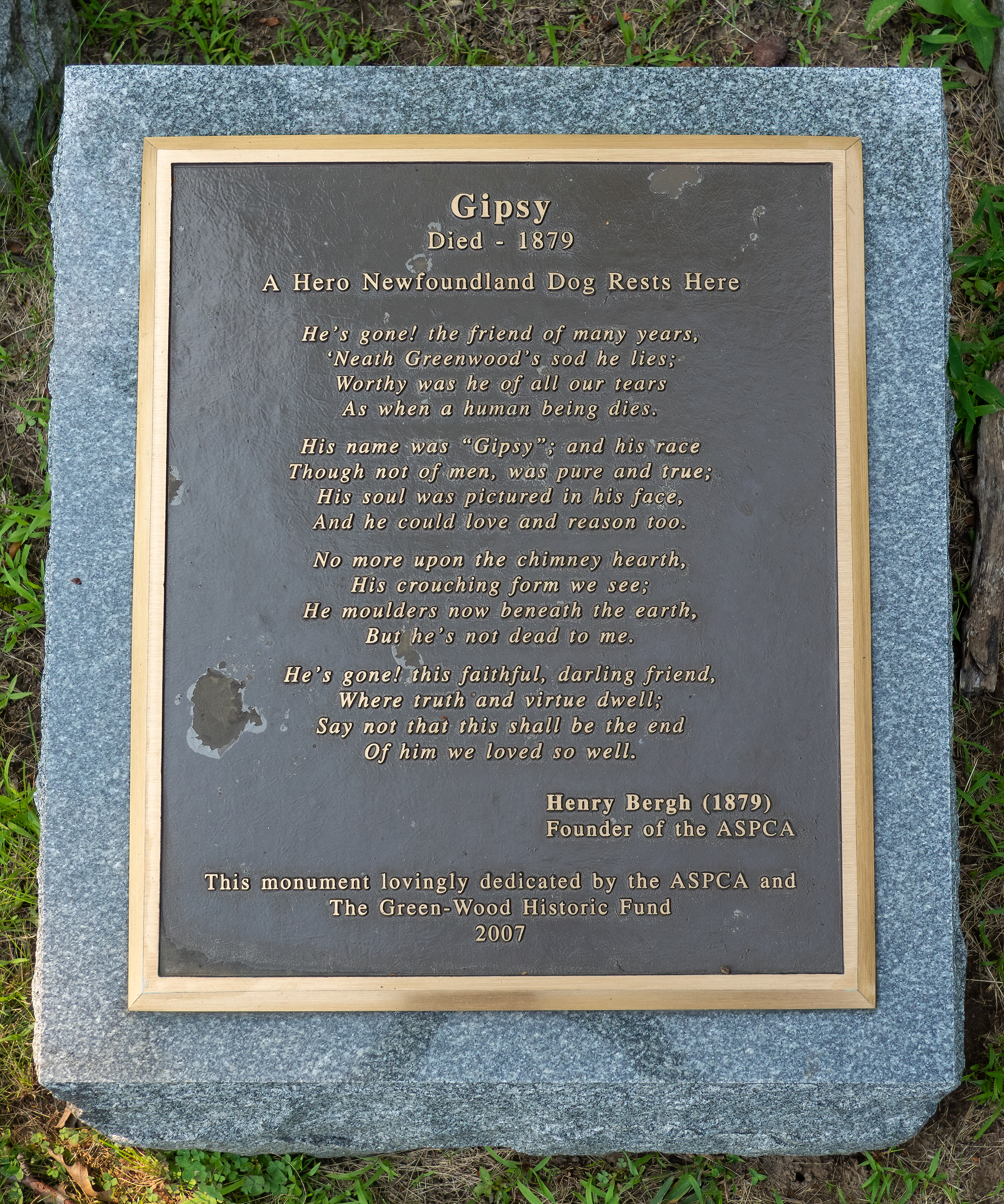
Plaque in Green-Wood Cemetery on the Wilmarth plot

Gipsy (died November 1879) was a large, long-lived Newfoundland dog which belonged to American artist Lemuel Wilmarth and his wife, Emma Belinda Barrett. The couple did not have children and were close with the dog, such that upon his death at the age of 23, the couple requested he be buried in their plot in Green-Wood Cemetery in Brooklyn, New York. They had a casket made, with Gipsy's name on a silver plate, and held a funeral for the dog, with a hearse and carriages. According to The New York Times, "the body was laid out in orthodox style, and had its front limbs placed in position, as if begging, and tied up with white satin ribbon." Wilmarth was quoted saying "No one could help loving Gipsy ... 'None knew her but to love her. None named her but to praise.' Why, I assure you she was almost human, and we miss her dreadfully."

News of Gipsy's death was covered in several newspapers, including a story in which Gipsy saved Mrs. Wilmarth from drowning some years before his death. The news inspired Henry Bergh, founder of the ASPCA, to write a poem for Gipsy. The Wilmarths had plans to have a headstone erected, but it did not happen in their lifetimes. In 2007, the ASPCA added a plaque bearing the full text of Bergh's poem on Wilmarth's plot, dedicated in a ceremony attended by Newfoundlands from local rescues.
