= Despatch (brig) =

Sailing vessel

History

United Kingdom
- Name: Despatch
- Owner: Crossthwaite
- Builder: Thomas Kirk, Whitehaven
- Launched: 28 February 1801
- Fate: Wrecked 10 July 1828, near Isle aux Morts, Newfoundland

General characteristics
- Class & type: Brig
- Tonnage: 187 gross tons
- Complement: 200 passengers, 11 crew

Despatch was a brig noted for having shipwrecked near Isle aux Morts, Newfoundland, and for the subsequent heroic rescue of many of her passengers and crew.

Despatch was partly owned by William Lancaster of Workington, England. On 29 May 1828 she set sail from Derry, Ireland en route to Quebec with eleven crew and 200 passengers, almost all of whom were Irish emigrants hoping to escape the poverty then prevailing in Ireland.

The ship ran aground 10 July 1828 on a small, bare rocky island near Isle aux Morts off the south coast of Newfoundland. A seventeen-year-old girl from the area, Ann Harvey, along with her father, her twelve-year-old brother and a dog, rescued 163 people from the wreck between 12 and 15 July. As a result, Ann Harvey became known as the Grace Darling of Newfoundland. The English government later awarded them a medal and a sum of money for their heroic feat.

Survivors were taken to Halifax aboard HMS Tyne.

== See also ==
- Lists of shipwrecks
- List of drowning victims
- Maritime archaeology
