= Isle aux Morts =

- Town
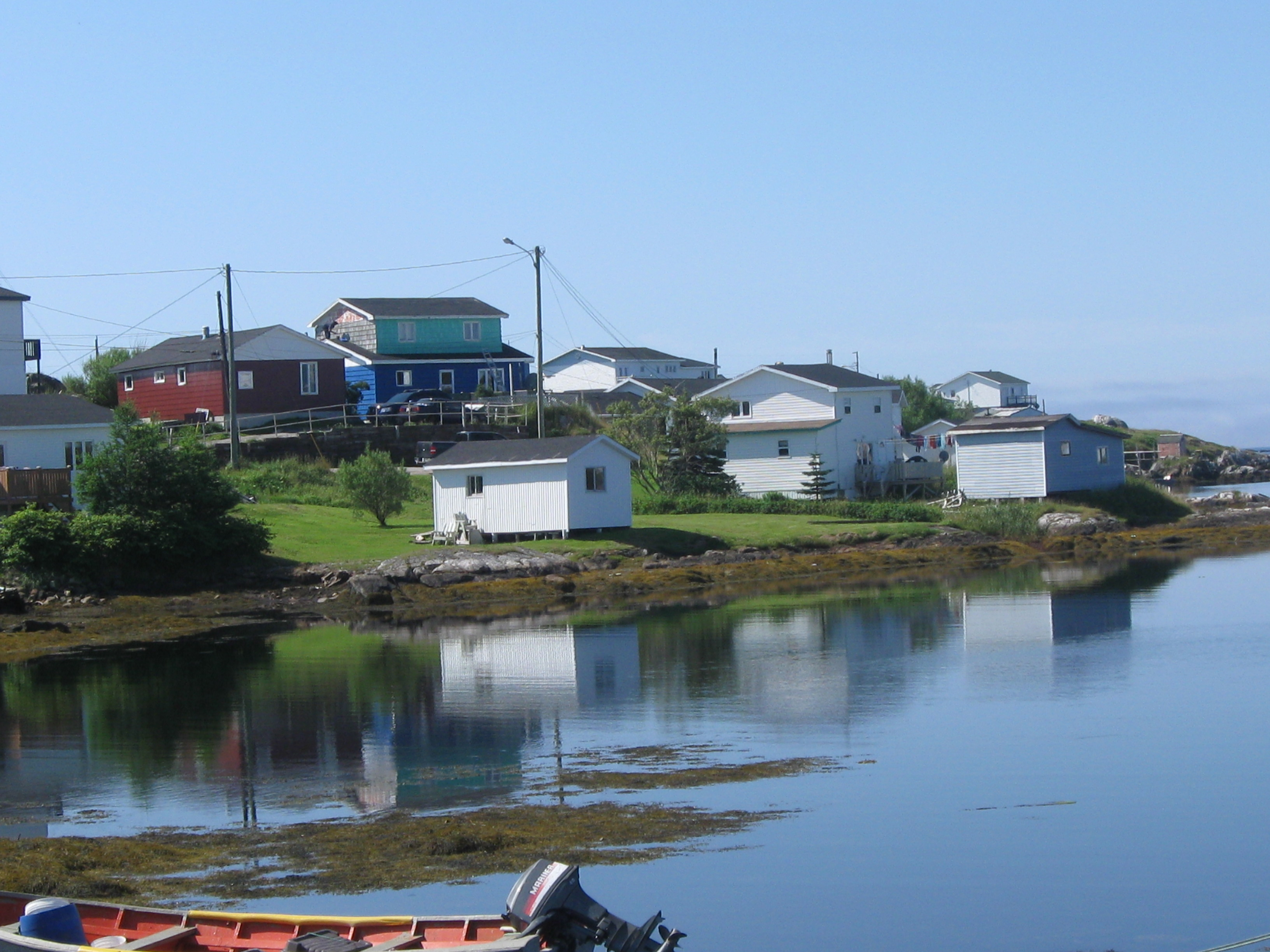

- Location of Isle aux Morts in Newfoundland
- Coordinates: 47°35′17″N 58°58′40″W
- Country: Canada
- Province: Newfoundland and Labrador

Population (2024)
  - Total: 578
- Time zone: UTC-3:30 (Newfoundland Time)
  - Summer (DST): UTC-2:30 (Newfoundland Daylight)
- Area code: 709
- Highways: Route 470
- Website: www.isleauxmorts.ca

Isle aux Morts (/ˌaɪl ə ˈmɔːrt/ EYEL ə MORT, French: [il o mɔʁ]; lit. 'Island of the Dead') is a small town on the Southwest Coast of the Island of Newfoundland, with a population of 559 (2021). The town is located approximately 16 km (9.9 mi) east from the Marine Atlantic Ferry Terminal in Port aux Basques along Route 470.

There are two walking trails: Harvey Trail, named after George Harvey and his family (information below), and Boat Cove Trail, named for Boat Cove Pond, where residents obtained drinking water years ago. These two trails offer a great view of the harbour and the town. The Walters House museum, which is in an old-style house which shows what life was like in the past in Isle aux Morts. The house acted as the first school and church in Isle aux Morts. Another trail is the Secret Lawrence trail, near the left side of the town.

Currently, the town contains a local bar and a school housing students from kindergarten to grade 9. During the summer season there is a museum and local cafe.

In the summer, usually late July, there is a week long festival, Ann Harvey Days commemorating Ann Harvey and her family for their rescues of sailors stranded on sinking ships, on two occasions.

== History ==
Isle aux Morts has a rich Atlantic heritage and popular coastal scenery. The community was first settled as a fishing port on nearby islands. In the 1800s, the families moved from the islands to land and settled in what is now present day Isle aux Morts.

In 1868, the first school was built and was also used as a chapel for church services. Today it is the "Walters House Museum." The local Orange lodge was constructed in 1914 with free labor by a group of men who previously used the school for their meetings.

The first fishery products plant was constructed in 1939 and burned down in 1943. Another was built and became the heart of the community for the next fifty years.

LeGallais Memorial, was built in 1958 and served as a grade school until 1989 when the new LeGallais Memorial school was open. In the early 2000s the high school students from this school began being bused to neighboring Port aux Basques due to declining enrolment.

The town is mentioned in the lyrics to the Tragically Hip song "The Dire Wolf" on their In Violet Light album.

=== Name origin ===
The town is named after a formerly inhabited nearby island and is a reference to the many shipwrecks off the coast. Isle aux Morts translates from French as "Island of the Dead".

=== Archeology ===
On November 26, 1981, Wayne Mushrow discovered a very rare and working Portuguese mariner's astrolabe on a shipwreck near Isle aux Morts. The year "1628" and "Y. Dyas" are stamped on the astrolabe, indicating that it was likely made by known astrolabe maker Joas Dyas. Portuguese mariner's astrolabes are unique because they are graduated for zenith distance only.

In 1983, at the same site, Mushrow found a French mariner's astrolabe stamped with the year "1617" and the name "Adrian Holland". It is unknown whether he was the maker or owner of the astrolabe. In 2001, the Mushrow Astrolabes were designated heritage treasures by the provincial government and placed in the collection of the Provincial Museum of Newfoundland and Labrador.

== Demographics ==
In the 2021 Census of Population conducted by Statistics Canada, Isle aux Morts had a population of 559 living in 258 of its 292 total private dwellings, a change of −15.8% from its 2016 population of 664. With a land area of 7.75 km^{2} (2.99 sq mi), it had a population density of 72.1/km^{2} (186.8/sq mi) in 2021.

== Sports and recreation ==
There is an outdoor ice rink maintained by volunteers and in Port aux Basques, 16 km (9.9 mi) away, there is a state of the art sports complex with an ice rink, curling rink, bowling alley, swimming pool and fitness center. The vast country and barren landscape make snowmobile and ATV use very popular.

Each February there is a Winter Classic Pond Hockey Tournament on a pond in the community where locals and ex-pats join to break up the long cold winter.

== Economy ==
In the 1970s and 1980s this town, like many others in Newfoundland thrived on the fishing industry and the peak population in the 1980s was near 1200. Since the cod moratorium in the 1990s, the town has struggled and lost near half of its permanent residents because of the closing of the fish plant and many secondary sources of work.

Most locals that live in the community commute on a rotational basis for work elsewhere in Newfoundland or Canada.

The economy relies heavily on the tourism industry in the summer months. Tourism has grown in recent years with the successful promotion of the annual Ann Harvey Days Festival, the Isle aux Morts Theatre Festival as well as the development and beautification of the local Harvey's Trail. In neighboring communities guided fishing trips and boat tours to nearby resettled ghost towns are available in the summer months.

== Notable persons of community ==
The town is most famously noted for George Harvey, his daughter Ann Harvey, her brother and their dog, Hairy Man. They are known because of their bravery in rescuing sailors from two sinking ships, the Despatch and The Rankin.

A chamber opera based on the story of Ann Harvey entitled "Ann & Seamus" was written for Shallaway - Newfoundland and Labrador Youth in Chorus by Stephen Hatfield in 2007. The opera was based on the narrative poem by Kevin Major.

== See also ==
- List of cities and towns in Newfoundland and Labrador
- List of people of Newfoundland and Labrador
- Channel-Port aux Basques, Newfoundland and Labrador
- Newfoundland outport
