= Lemuel Wilmarth =

American painter (1835–1918)

Lemuel Everett Wilmarth
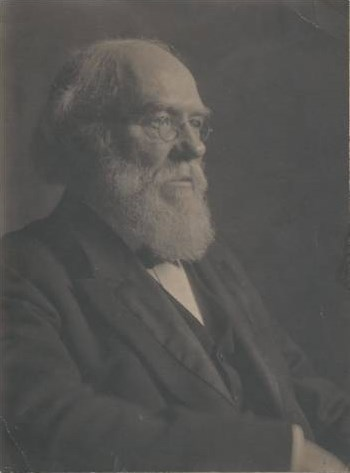
- Wilmarth, 1912
- Born: Lemuel Everett Wilmarth; November 11, 1835; Attleboro, Massachusetts, US
- Died: July 27, 1918 (aged 82); New York City, US
- Education: Pennsylvania Academy of the Fine Arts; Royal Academy at Munich (Academy of Fine Arts, Munich); Ecole de Beaux Arts
- Known for: Painter; Art professor
- Notable work: Left In Charge; Ingratitude; The Pick of the Orchard; Jack's Return

Lemuel Everett Wilmarth (November 11, 1835 – July 27, 1918) was an American painter. He was a founder of the Art Students League of New York and a member of the National Academy of Design. He was professor in charge of the schools of the National Academy of Design in Manhattan from 1870 to 1890. He was among America's most respected teachers of art during the later nineteenth century.

== Family and Education ==
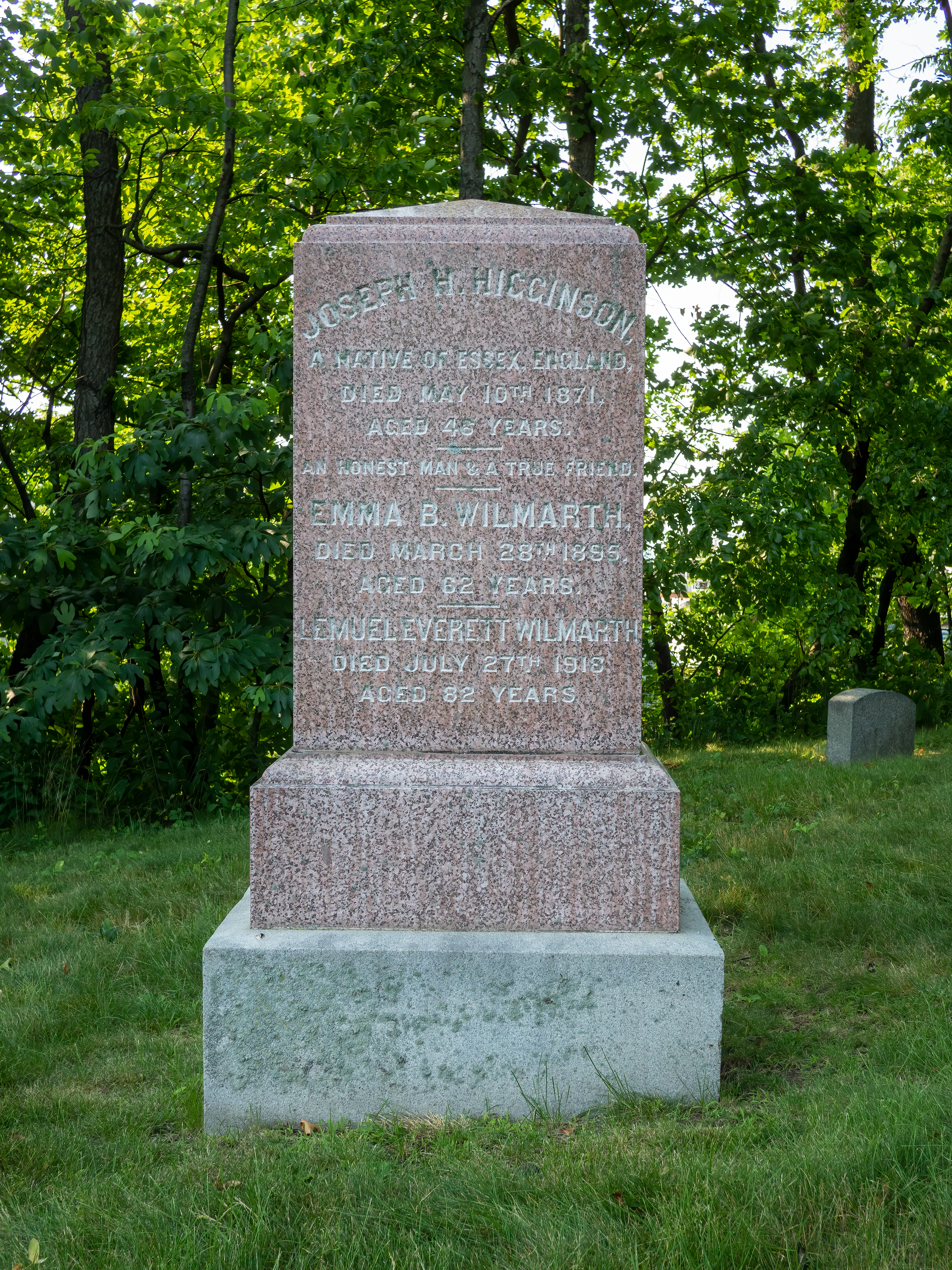
Headstone in Green-Wood Cemetery

Lemuel Wilmarth was born in Attleboro, MA, the son of Benoni Wilmarth and Fanny Fuller. He was raised and educated in Boston, MA. Early on he learned the trade of watchmaking. In 1854 he began the study of drawing in night school at the Pennsylvania Academy of Fine Arts in Philadelphia. He went to Europe in 1858 and studied at the Royal Academy at Munich for three and a half years (1859-’63) under Wilhelm von Kaulbach and at the Ecole Des Beaux Arts in Paris for two and a half years (1864-‘7) under Jean-Léon Gérôme.

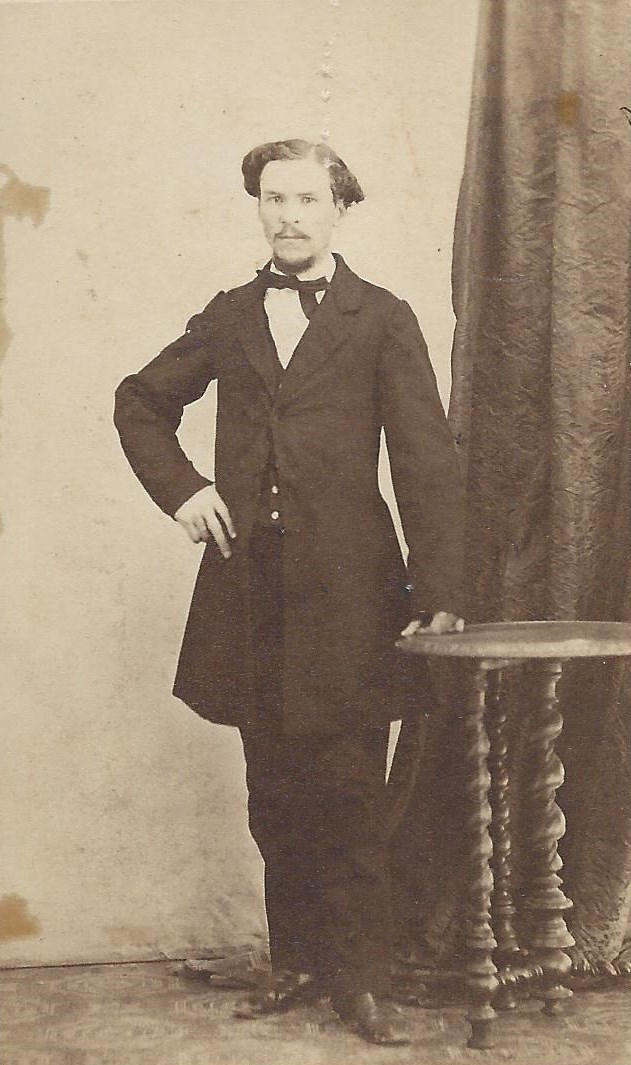
Wilmarth, circa 1860

He was married to Emma Belinda Barrett, daughter of William Barrett of Essex, England, in 1872. She died March 8, 1895, at age 62. They had no children, but did have a dog, Gipsy, with whom they are buried in Green-Wood Cemetery in Brooklyn, New York.

His home "Sunny Crest" was near Marlboro on the Hudson River. It and some of his paintings were destroyed by fire. At the time of his death, he resided at 352 Adelphi St., Brooklyn, NY.

== Artistic career ==
Among his best known paintings are The Pick of the Orchard, Ingratitude, Left in Charge and Sunny Italy. On Guard is one of two known versions of this scene; Wilmarth gave the other, Left in Charge, to the National Academy of Design. Images of some of his works can be viewed at the External links listed below. He taught many art students, including Thomas Pollock Anshutz, James Carroll Beckwith, William Merritt Chase, Frederick Stuart Church, Louise Cox, Xantippe Saunders, Abbott Handerson Thayer, Harry Chase and Robert Koehler. He was a great influence to his grand-niece Alice Wilmarth Busing, a painter proficient in oils, pastels, and watercolor.

Wilmarth began his teaching career in New York in 1867 at the Brooklyn Academy of Design. In 1870, he was asked to head the Schools of the National Academy of Design. As the first Professor of Art and Director of the academy schools, Wilmarth was crucial to the development of a structured curriculum at the academy. Open to progressive ideas, he worked for a women's life class.

In May 1871 he was elected "associate" to the National Academy of Design in New York. That same month he was offered the job of Professor of Art at Yale University, but he chose to remain at the National Academy of Design. In May 1873 he was elected "academician" to the National Academy of Design. An associate was required to present to the academy within a year his own 25" by 30" portrait in oil colors, and an academician a specimen of his Art. These were to be preserved in the gallery of the academy, and to be the property of the National Academy of Design.

Left in Charge, as part of the academy's 49th Annual Exhibition, was reviewed in the New York Tribune in 1874. It suggested that "perhaps his arduous duties as Director of the Academy School of Design prevent his giving the time he ought to his art".

In the spring of 1875, the National Academy of Design was not guaranteed to reopen in the fall. In response, Wilmarth helped found the Art Students League of New York. He hosted the first meeting in his studio and offered to teach the life classes for free until the league could afford to pay him. He stayed on as the League's first president for the League's first two years, but when the National Academy reopened, he resigned from the League and returned to his position at the academy.

Although he was elected to the National Academy of Design Council in 1892, illness forced him to resign the following year. He was losing his eyesight. His paintings, fruit still lifes and meticulous genre scenes, became infrequent, and it appears that he all but ceased to paint.

In 1894, Wilmarth wrote an article “Essentials of an Art School” for the catalogue of the 69th Annual Exhibition of the National Academy of Design. He stated, “… education of the eye and training of the hand are the distinctive functions of art schools. ...It is essential in the evolution of any vital, soul-stirring art, that no instruction should discourage, no curriculum of study should retard, no charm of mere handling should supersede the fullest, freest development of the soul-activities of individual artists.”

== Religion ==
Wilmarth was prominent as a worker in the Swedenborgian denomination, and was a member of the Swedenborgian Church of the New Jerusalem. He had written considerably on religious and social subjects, and was one of the founders of the New Earth, a Swedenborgian publication, in 1872, and was afterward its editor for several years.

== Letters ==
To Wilmarth from NAD, May 11, 1871

To Wilmarth from Yale, May 22, 1871

From Wilmarth to Yale p1, May 29, 1871

From Wilmarth to Yale p2, May 29, 1871

To Wilmarth from NAD, May 15, 1873
