= Naval surgeon =

Person responsible for the health of the people aboard a ship at sea

A naval surgeon, or less commonly ship's doctor, is the person responsible for the health of the ship's company aboard a warship. The term appears often in reference to Royal Navy's medical personnel during the Age of Sail.

== Ancient uses ==
Specialised crew members capable of providing medical care have been a feature of military vessels for at least two thousand years. The second-century Roman Navy under Emperor Hadrian included a surgeon aboard each of its triremes, with the position earning twice a regular officer's pay.

== Royal Navy ==
From the early days of the Royal Navy, surgeons had been carried on board ships (albeit intermittently, depending on the length of voyage and likelihood of hostilities). In the Tudor period, surgeons were regulated by the Company of Barber-Surgeons. William Clowes, sometime Warden of the Company, and his colleague John Banister (both of whom had served at sea early in their careers) did much to ensure that naval surgeons were properly qualified and prepared. Clowes emphasized the fact that, although surgeons were prohibited from acting as physicians on land, at sea they would routinely be required to prescribe medicines, administer treatment and offer medical advice; appropriate instruction was provided and Clowes advised ships' captains only to engage as surgeons those whom the Company had approved.

British colonization of the Americas led to longer sea voyages, battles and skirmishes far from home and encounters with new diseases, all of which contributed to a greater regularisation of the naval medical service. In 1629 the Company of Barber-Surgeons was empowered to examine every individual intending to act as a surgeon (on 'any ship whether in the service of the Crown or of a merchant') and likewise to conduct an examination of their surgical instruments and medicine chest prior to their departure. As well as a surgeon, each fighting ship was provided with one or more surgeon's mates (depending on the size and rating of the vessel); surgeon's mates were recruited from the age of sixteen and provided with basic training. Recruitment was a significant problem; it was in this context that the basic pay of surgeons was gradually improved, from 30 shillings a month in the 1620s to £5 a month by the end of the century.

In the 18th century the Navy Board continued to qualify surgeons through an examination at the Barber-Surgeons' Company; surgeons could also be recruited overseas (on recommendation of shore-based naval medical staff, or else a minimum of three surgeons of the squadron), in which case they would have to serve time as a surgeon's mate before being recognised as a surgeon. Throughout this time diseases were a far greater hazard aboard ship than battles; during the Napoleonic Wars it is estimated that 50% of casualties were caused by disease, 31% by individual accidents, 10% by fire, explosion or shipwrecks and only 8% by enemy action.

By 1814, the Royal Navy had 14 physicians, 850 surgeons, 500 assistants surgeons caring for 130,000 men on shore and at sea. They were now comparatively well paid, starting at £14 per month in 1815 for surgeons with less than 6 years of experience, up to £25 4s for 20 years of experience; they were also allowed £43 for equipment, £5 for every 100 cases of venereal disease they treated, and a personal servant. Factoring in prize money, a ship's surgeon could make well over £200 a year.

After the end of the Napoleonic Wars, the Company of Surgeons relinquished its rights to examine prospective naval surgeons and their equipment. By the 1840s all applicants were required to be qualified practitioners, in addition to which they had to provide a 'certificate of good moral character' and to be examined by the Inspector-General of Naval Hospitals and Fleets.

=== Rank ===
Physicians (unlike most surgeons) were university graduates, and they were regarded as belonging to a higher social class. The two principal Royal Naval Hospitals (established in the mid-eighteenth century) were both overseen by physicians, with surgeons working under them. Towards the end of the 18th century, superintending physicians were appointed to naval fleets; but (other than when seconded to fleets) physicians did not usually serve at sea. In 1840 the rank (as it was then termed) of Physician in the Royal Navy was abolished, and replaced with that of 'Inspector of Hospitals and Fleets'.

Surgeons were not at first required to have a medical degree and were generally trained by apprenticeship; however their status rose over time 'from the obscurity of being classed with the lowest ranks, with no uniform and no authority in the early eighteenth century, to achieve the distinction of commissioned rank in the middle of the nineteenth century'. Until the Navy's medical services were reorganized in 1806, surgeons were warranted by individual ship captains, not commissioned by the Admiralty. After 1808, surgeons, like masters, were considered equivalent to commissioned officers and were 'Warrant officers of Wardroom Rank'; as such they were billeted along with the other officers in the wardroom.

Surgeons were assisted by surgeon's mates, who after 1805 were called assistant surgeons. The surgeon and his mates were assisted by boys, who were called loblolly boys, named after the gruel commonly served in the sick bay. A small number of doctors with a prestigious medical education were ranked as physicians; they would supervise surgeons on ships or run hospitals on shore. Since at least the middle of the 19th century, naval medical officers were divided into a rank system that was almost identical to that of their army counterparts.

=== Duties ===
The surgeon's duties included responsibility for his mates and loblolly boys, visiting patients at least twice a day, and keeping accurate records on each patient admitted to his care. The surgeon would take morning sick call at the mainmast, assisted by his mates, as well as tending to injured sailors during the day. During sea battles, the surgeon worked in the cockpit, a space permanently partitioned off near a hatchway down which the wounded could be carried for treatment. The deck was strewn with sand prior to battle to prevent the surgeon from slipping in the blood that accumulated.

In addition to caring for the sick and wounded, surgeons were responsible for regulating sanitary conditions on the ship. They fumigated the sick bay and sometimes whole decks by burning brimstone (sulfur), and maintained the ventilating machines that supplied fresh air to the lower decks to keep them dry.

As set out in the Regulations and Instructions Relating to His Majesty's Service at Sea first published in 1730, surgeons were required to keep two journals: 'the one of his Physical Practice in Diseases; the other of his Chirurgical Operations and, at the End of the Voyage, to deliver the first to the Physicians in the Commission of Sick and Wounded; and the latter to the Governors of the Surgeons Company, who are to examine the same and certify their Judgment thereupon'.

== Notable naval surgeons ==
=== Historical ===
- George Bass (1771 – after 1803) sailed to New South Wales as ship's doctor on HMS Reliance. He was a naturalist and explorer; Bass Strait is named in his honour.
- William Balmain (1762–1803) was a Scottish-born naval surgeon and civil administrator who sailed as an assistant surgeon with the First Fleet to establish the European settlement in Australia, and later became principal surgeon for New South Wales.
- William Beatty (1773–1842) was the ship's surgeon on HMS Victory at the Battle of Trafalgar. He tended the mortally wounded Admiral Nelson and wrote an account of the battle.
- William Ruschenberger (1807–1895) was a naturalist and surgeon aboard USS Peacock, as well as the namesake of the boa Corallus ruschenbergerii.
- Richard Brinsley Hinds (1811–1846) was a surgeon on the 1835–1842 voyage of HMS Sulphur to explore the Pacific Ocean, and edited the natural history reports of the expedition.
- Thomas Henry Huxley (1825–1895), anatomist known as "Darwin's Bulldog", was an assistant ship's surgeon early in his career, on HMS Rattlesnake
- William Carr (1883–1966) was an Australian naval surgeon and admiral who, in the course of his career, served on HMAS Melbourne, HMAS Australia, and HMAS Sydney.
- Timothy Blair McLean (1910–1982), Canadian Surgeon-General, served as a medical officer and surgeon aboard HMCS Uganda during the Second World War.

=== Fictional ===
- Stephen Maturin, one of the main characters of Patrick O'Brian's Aubrey-Maturin series
- Lemuel Gulliver, main character of Johnathan Swift's Gulliver's Travels
- Yoshikage Kira, side character of Hirohiko Araki's JoJolion
