= Victor A. McPherson =

Canadian surgeon general (1928–2025)

Major-General Victor Allon McPherson (19 June 1928 – 19 June 2025) was the 27th Canadian Surgeon General.

== Life and career ==
Born in Calgary, Alberta, McPherson was educated at the University of British Columbia, where he graduated with a bachelor of arts degree in 1950 and with a medical degree in 1954. He also completed post-graduate studies at the University of Alberta and the University of Toronto from 1959-1963.

While attending medical school McPherson "joined the Royal Canadian Army Medical Corps as a member of their training program" in 1952. His first posting, as a newly promoted captain, was to the 2nd Battalion, Queen's Own Rifles of Canada in British Columbia, as the regimental medical officer, in 1956. The following year, McPherson was promoted to major and posted as a medical officer to the Canadian Field Hospital, as part of the United Nations Emergency Force (UNEF1), in Egypt.

In 1957, he was next posted, as commanding officer to the Alberta Military Hospital in Calgary and Wainwright, Alberta. He remained in the position until 1959, at which time he returned to university.

Following the completion of his post-graduate studies in 1963, McPherson was appointed chief of surgery at Fort Churchill Military Hospital in Churchill, Manitoba. In 1964, he joined the staff of the National Defence Medical Centre as a surgeon.

In 1965, McPherson was promoted to lieutenant-colonel and appointed chief of surgery for the 1st Canadian Air Division in Zweibrucken, West Germany. He remained in the position until 1968, when he returned to Canada and was appointed chief of surgery at NDMC. The following year, McPherson was promoted to colonel and appointed chief of surgery at the Canadian Forces Hospital in Kingston, Ontario.

His next posting, in 1975 was to the staff of the surgeon general as the director of medical plans and requirements. In 1976, he was promoted to brigadier-general and appointed Deputy Surgeon General. He remained in the position until 1980, at which time he was promoted to major-general and appointment as Surgeon General in 1980.

McPherson retired from the military in 1982 and the following year, became a consultant on medical policy for the Ontario Ministry of Health within the Ontario Health Insurance Plan Head Office in Kingston, remaining in the position until 1991. He died in Ottawa on 19 June 2025, his 97th birthday.
