= Arthur Evans Snell =

- Born: March 19, 1877; Woodbridge, Ontario, Canada
- Died: September 25, 1967 (aged 90); Ottawa, Ontario, Canada
- Occupation: military physician

Colonel A.E. Snell CMG, OStJ, DSO (March 91, 1877 - September 25, 1967) was the tenth Canadian Surgeon General.

== Biography ==
Born in Woodbridge, Ontario, A.E. Snell was educated at the University of Toronto, where he graduated with a Medical Degree.

He joined the Canadian Army Medical Corps (CAMC) as a member of the Non-Permanent Active Militia, commissioned as a lieutenant 21 November 1905. His early career can be traced in the published Militia Lists. He qualified for his rank in 1906 and was promoted captain in 1908, all of his time as a junior medical officer being spent posted to No. XIII (Cavalry) Field Ambulance, Toronto. He transferred to the Permanent Army Medical Corps as lieutenant in 1910, captain in 1912. In the spring of 1914 he was appointed Assistant Director General Medical Services (A.D.M.S.), the senior medical officer for the Military Division No. 1, Western Ontario, with H.Q. London, Ont.

In September 1914, Snell was granted a temporary commission in 2 Canadian Field Ambulance of the Canadian Expeditionary Force (C.E.F.), and proceeded to France with that unit in February 1915. He was subsequently promoted to major and appointed Deputy Assistant Director Medical Services (D.A.D.M.S.) for the Canadian Corps in France. In 1916, newly promoted to Colonel, he acceded to the position of A.D.M.S. for the new 3rd Canadian Division of the C.E.F., a position which he held until the summer of 1918 when he was elevated to Deputy Director Medical Services Canadian Corps, in charge of all medical arrangements for the Corps in France and Flanders. At the coming of peace, he returned to Canada and took up his permanent force position and medical practice in London, Ont. His post-war appointments included Acting Director General Medical Services (D.G.M.S.) January to June 1921, Deputy Director Medical Services 1922-1925, District Medical Officer for Military District 10 (Winnipeg) 1926-1930, and District Medical Officer for Military District 4 (Montreal) 1930-1933.

In 1924, Snell wrote "The C.A.M.C: With the Canadian Corps During the Last Hundred Days of the Great War", detailing medical support to the Canadian advance during the momentous closing days of the war. In contrast to the intimate approach used in contemporary accounts of the C.A.M.C. (Adami, Nasmith, Bell), Snell offered a detached, operational perspective - in short, that of the D.D.M.S., whose role it was to guide and support medical operations during the final offensive. In the Introduction of the book Major-General JT Fotheringham offers that it might be "the first contribution made by the Canadian Medical Service to the literature of training. It is full of the kind of experience that will make it valuable, if not exactly as a Manual, yet as a source from which Tactical and Administrative problems can be studied by coming generations of Medical Officers."

In 1933, Snell was appointed Director General Medical Services. He retired in 1936. During his tenure as D.G.M.S. he succeeded in guiding a careful and relatively painless inter-war reduction of the Army Medical Corps, part of a larger reduction of the Canadian Militia in the face of severe budgetary constraint and changing military technology.

Colonel Snell died 25 September 1967 at the age of 91.
