= Canadian Forces School of Survival and Aeromedical Training =

Coordinates: 49.896111°N 97.251847°W

- École de Survie et de Médecine de l'Air Des Forces Canadiennes
- Active: September 1996 – present (30 years, 1 month)
- Country: Canada
- Type: Air Force
- Size: 40 regular personnel
- Mottos: INSTITUERE – SUPERARE – PUGNARE, meaning "To Train, To Survive, To Fight"

The Canadian Forces School of Survival and Aeromedical Training (CFSSAT) in Winnipeg, Manitoba, was established in 1996. It provides instruction to aircrew on life support equipment, survival and aviation physiology.

== Organization ==
The Canadian Forces School of Survival and Aeromedical Training (CFSSAT) is a training institution of the Royal Canadian Air Force (RCAF).

== Courses and facilities ==
The CFSSAT provides training for aircrew and other Canadian Armed Forces (CAF) personnel, in survival and aeromedicine. It is the central facility for spatial disorientation training.

Life support systems and in-flight safety protocols are taught at the school's main facility, the Wilbur Rounding Franks building (Note: The Wilbur Rounding Franks building is named for Wilbur R. Franks, the Canadian scientist who invented the anti-gravity suit.) at CFB Winnipeg.

CFSSAT is the only NATO member with a dedicated Arctic survival course, conducted in Resolute Bay, Nunavut. The course was initiated after a fatal aircrash on Ellesmere Island in 1991.

== History ==
The Wilbur Rounding Franks building was officially opened in September 1996 as the new home of CFSSAT. It is located on West Street, 17 Wing and is dedicated to the memory of Group Captain Wilbur Rounding Franks, OBE, CD, in honour of his numerous contributions to the field of aerospace medicine. The ceremony officiated by the Surgeon General, Maj Gen Wendy Arlene Clay, the School Commandant, Maj KC Glass and the Grandson of Dr Franks, Mr Hugh Franks. It is a combination of the Canadian Forces Survival Training School from Edmonton and the amalgamation of three Aeromedical Training units from 426 Squadron Trenton, 404 Squadron Greenwood and Canadian Forces School of Aeromedical Training in Edmonton.

The Altitude Chamber Facility was originally designed by Guardite Corporation in September 1954 and was installed in the Chamber Annex in Cold Lake under Contract #446 in 1955. In 1981, it was moved to the Canadian Forces School of Aeromedical Training in Griesbach, Edmonton. The chamber was then moved to 17 Wing Winnipeg, when the school combined with Canadian Forces Survival School to become the Canadian Forces School Survival and Aeromedical Training, 17 Wing Winnipeg in 1996.

The Recompression Chamber was originally installed at Canadian Forces School of Aeromedical Training, Griesbach, CFB Edmonton in 1984, to provide immediate medical assistance to staff and students who suffered altitude induced decompression sickness. The chamber was moved to its current location at 17 Wing Winnipeg in 1996. While in Winnipeg, its use also included several civilian medical cases due to the chambers' unique benefits of hyperbaric medicine. In 2008, the CAF aeromedical program changed its training method and with the risk of decompression sickness being virtually eliminated, the hyperbaric chamber was not required any further. On November 8, 2011, it received approval to cease dive operations, decommission and remove the chamber, with final removal occurring on 24 Jun 2013.

SERE Flt is responsible to handle all outdoor survival training. This includes Air Operations Survival - Land (AOS-L), Air Operations Survival - SERE (AOS-SERE) and Air Operations Survival - Arctic (AOS-AA). AOS-L and AOS-SERE are both conducted at Springer Lake, within Nopiming Provincial Park. AOS-AA is conducted at Crystal City, Manitoba, part of the Arctic Training Centre (ATC), just north of Resolute Bay.

== Emblem and motto ==
A badge has been registered to the school: "Argent semé of mullets Azure, a triangle Vert charged with a rod of Aesculapius Or". The triangle is a symbol of danger and represented the survival aspect of the school, surrounding stars (mullets) represent the air and aviation, and the rod of Aesculapius symbolizes medicine. The blazon displays the school's motto, Latin: instituere superare pugnare, meaning "to train, to survive, to fight".

== Gallery ==
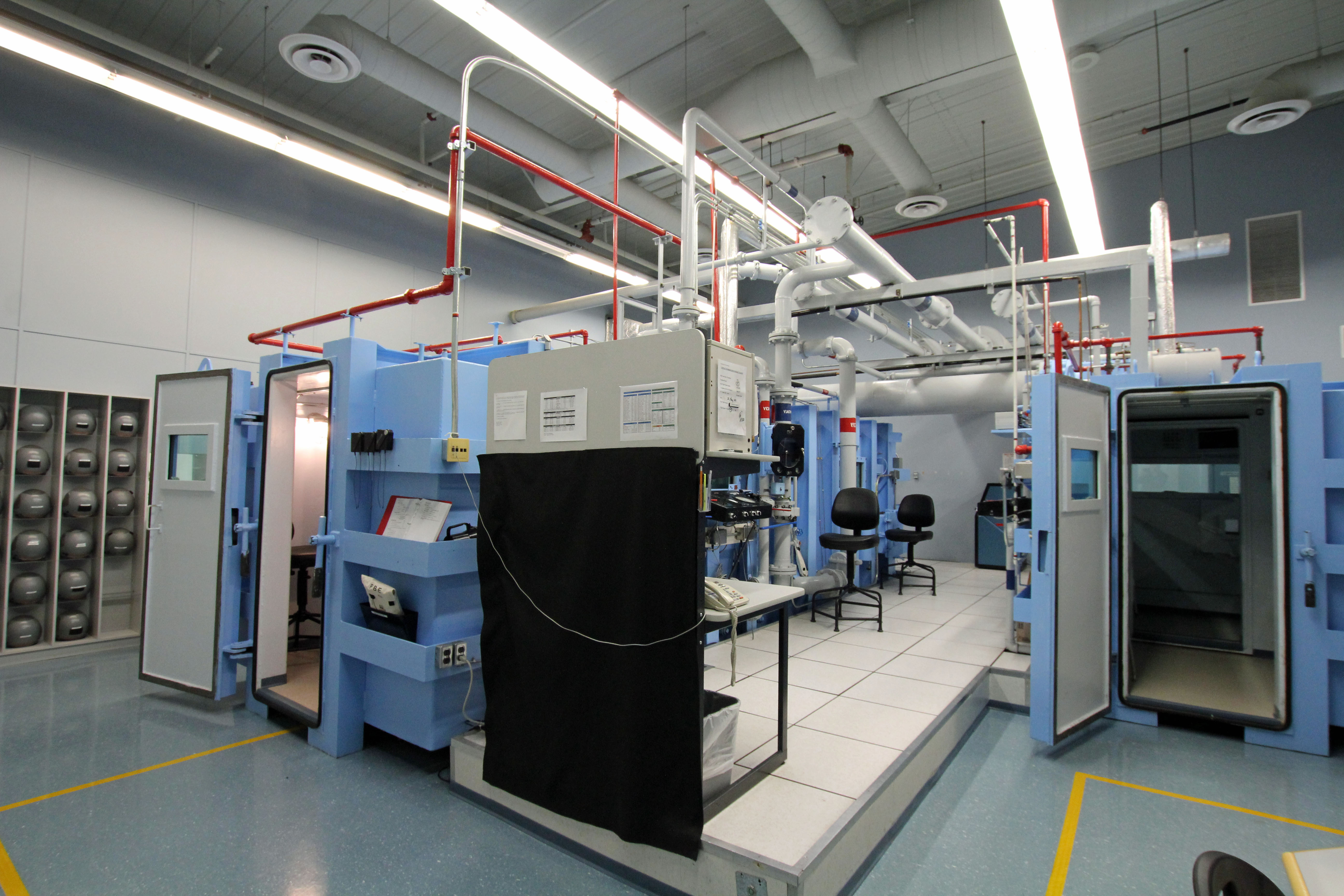
Hypobaric Chamber

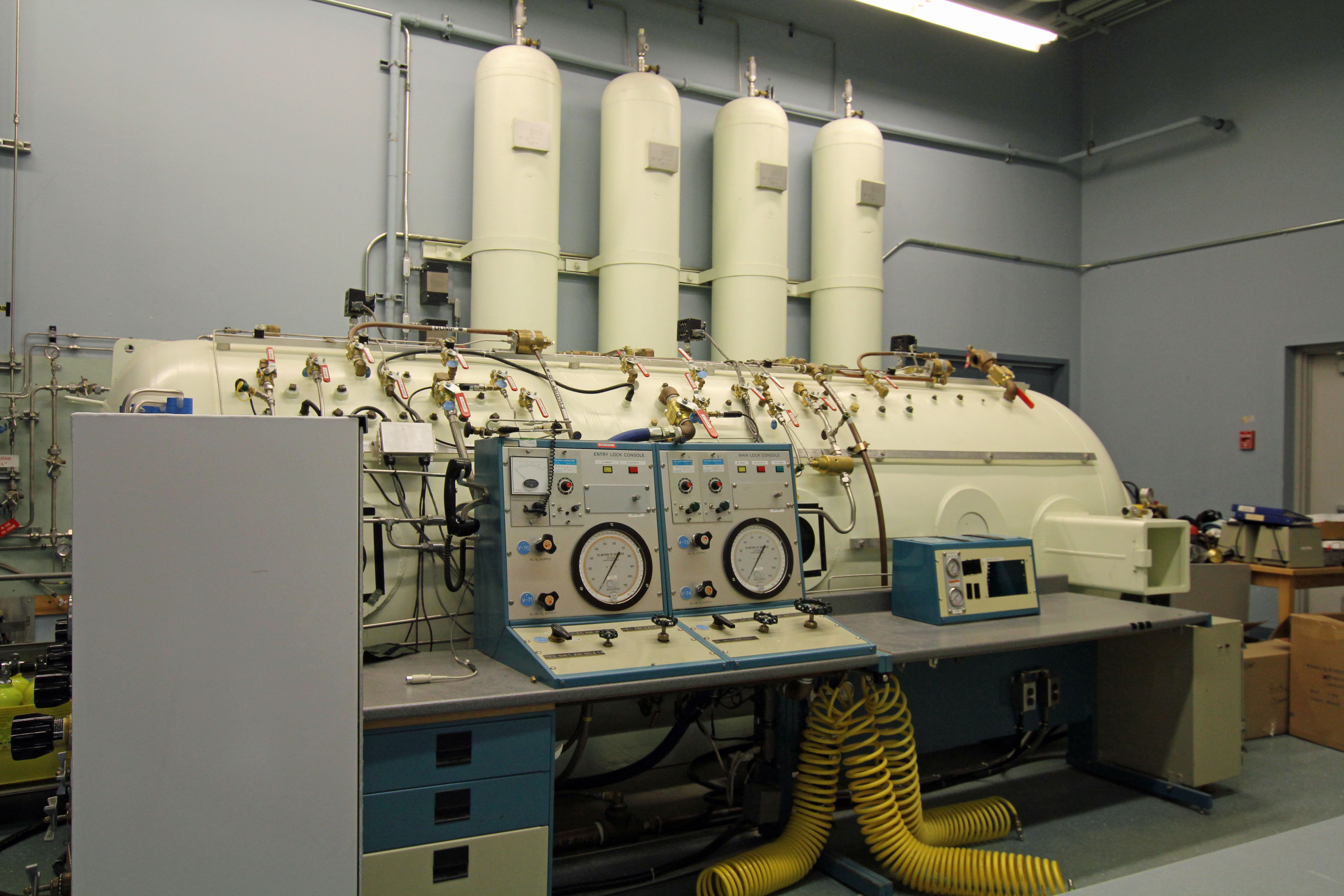
Decommissioned Hyperbaric Chamber
