= Charles Joseph Knight =

Canadian surgeon general (1931–2023)

Charles Joseph Knight CMM CD QHP

30th Surgeon General of Canada
- In office 1988–1990
- Preceded by: Robert W. Fassold
- Succeeded by: Joseph Jean Benoit

Personal details
- Born: September 11, 1931 Lambton, Ontario, Canada
- Died: September 1, 2023 (aged 91) Ottawa, Ontario, Canada
- Education: University of Western Ontario; University of Pennsylvania

Surgeon Rear-Admiral Charles Joseph Knight CMM CD QHP (September 11, 1931 – September 1, 2023) was a Canadian admiral who was the 30th Surgeon General of Canada.

== Life ==
Born in Dawn Township, Lambton, Ontario, Knight was educated at the University of Western Ontario, where he graduated with his Bachelor of Arts Degree in 1953 and his Medical Degree in 1957. He also completed post-graduate studies at the University of Pennsylvania from 1966 to 1968.

Knight joined the military during his undergraduate studies in 1950 with the Armoured Corps, and transferred into the Medical Corps in 1956 while attending medical school. His first posting was to Her Majesty's Canadian Ship (HMCS) Naden in 1957. Knight was next posted from 1963 to 1966 to HMCS Shearwater. He was then posted to the Institute of Aviation Medicine, in Toronto, Ontario, with the diving team. Knight left for a brief period of time to return to university, and then upon completion, resumed his duties at the institute in 1970.

In 1971, Knight was posted to Air Defence Headquarters as Commanding Surgeon; remaining in the position until 1975, when he was sent on a six-month tour with the United Nations to Egypt.

Upon returning to Canada in 1976, Knight was posted to Maritime Command Headquarters, in Halifax, Nova Scotia as Deputy Command Surgeon. Shortly after arriving in Halifax, he was transferred to Air Command Winnipeg as Command Surgeon, and remained in the position until 1979, when he was posted to Ottawa to work on the staff of the Surgeon General as Director of Medical Operations and Training.

From 1982 to 1985, Knight was posted to the National Defence Medical Centre (NDMC) as Commandant. In 1985, he was appointed Deputy Surgeon General and in 1988 was appointed Surgeon General. He remained in the position until his retirement from the military in 1990.

Knight died on September 1, 2023, at the age of 91.
