= Hugh Mackay =

Hugh Mackay or MacKay may refer to:

- Hugh Mackay (Scottish general) (c. 1640–1692), Scottish general in Dutch service
- Hugh Mackay of Bighouse (fl. 1728–1746), Scottish soldier
- Hugh Mackay (New Brunswick politician, died 1848) (c. 1751–1848), American-born politician, judge and soldier in New Brunswick
- Hugh Mackay (Quebec politician) (1832–1890), Scottish-born businessman and politician in Quebec
- Hugh Mackay (footballer) (1867–?), Scottish footballer
- Hugh Mackay (New Brunswick politician, born 1887) (1887–1957), Canadian politician
- Hugh Mackay, 14th Lord Reay (1937–2013), member of the British House of Lords
- Hugh Mackay (social researcher) (born 1938), Australian psychologist and social researcher
- Hugh MacKay (Nova Scotia politician) (born 1954/55), Canadian politician
- Hugh Colin MacKay (fl. 1983–2017), Canadian Surgeon General

== See also ==
- Hugh McKay (disambiguation)
