= Hilary F. Jaeger =

Canadian Surgeon General (born 1959)

Brigadier-General H.F. Jaeger OMM, SSStJ, MSM, CD, QHP, MD, LLD(hon), FRCPSC(hon), plsc, pcsc (born 1 August 1959) was the 36th Canadian Surgeon General.

Born in Cambridge, England, Jaeger received her Bachelor of Science in 1979 from Acadia University, and her Medical Degree from the University of Toronto in 1986. She also obtained her Master of Science degree in Health Economics from the London School of Economics and Political Science in 2012.

Jaeger joined the West Nova Scotia Regiment (Reservist Unit) in 1976, while attending Acadia University. In 1983, she joined the Regular Force while attending medical school at the University of Toronto. Her first posting following medical school was with 1 Field Ambulance, in Calgary, Alberta.

In 1989, she was "posted to Germany to 4 Service Battalion". Jaeger was the Company Commander of 4 Field Ambulance from 1991 to 1993. During her posting Jaeger was deployed, on her first tour, to the former Yugoslavia in 1992, serving as "the Senior Medical Officer and Officer Commanding the National Support Element in Croatia and Bosnia-Herzegovina." The following year, she returned to Calgary and 1 Field Ambulance for a year, and while posted there was deployed back to Bosnia in 1994, "in command of the Forward Surgical Team."

She was promoted to Lieutenant-Colonel and appointed Commanding Officer of 2 Field Ambulance in 1996, and remained in the position until 1999. During this appointment Jaeger "had the privilege of leading the unit in support of the 1997 Manitoba flood and the 1998 Ice Storm." That same year, Jaeger took on a six-month instructing position at Canadian Land Forces Command and Staff College, also known as "Foxhole U".

Jaeger was promoted to Colonel in 2000, and "posted to Ottawa where [she] served as director of Health Services Operations and medical advisor to the chief of land staff and the surgeon general."

In 2004, Jaeger was promoted to Brigadier-General and appointed Surgeon General. In 2007 she succeeded Commodore M.F. Kavanagh OMM CD as Director General of Health Services and Commander Canadian Forces Health Services Group, while retaining her appointment of Surgeon General. In 2009 she was "deployed to the International Security Assistance Force (ISAF) HQ in Kabul overseeing medical support to NATO’s mission in Afghanistan."

Jaeger joined Veterans Affairs Canada as the National Medical Officer, in 2011, until her retirement from the military in 2013. After retiring, Dr. Jaeger was appointed to the Health Technology Expert Review Panel of the Canadian Agency for Drugs and Technologies in Health (CADTH) in 2014, and was subsequently appointed its Chair. She was also Chair of the Canadian College of Health Service Executives Ethics Committee (now the Canadian College of Health Leaders), Vice Chair of the Board of Directors for Osteoporosis Canada from 2013 to 2014, and Chair from 2015-2017. She was bestowed an honorary fellowship by the Royal College of Physicians and Surgeons of Canada in 2021.
