= North Sydney, Nova Scotia =

Community in Nova Scotia, Canada

North Sydney
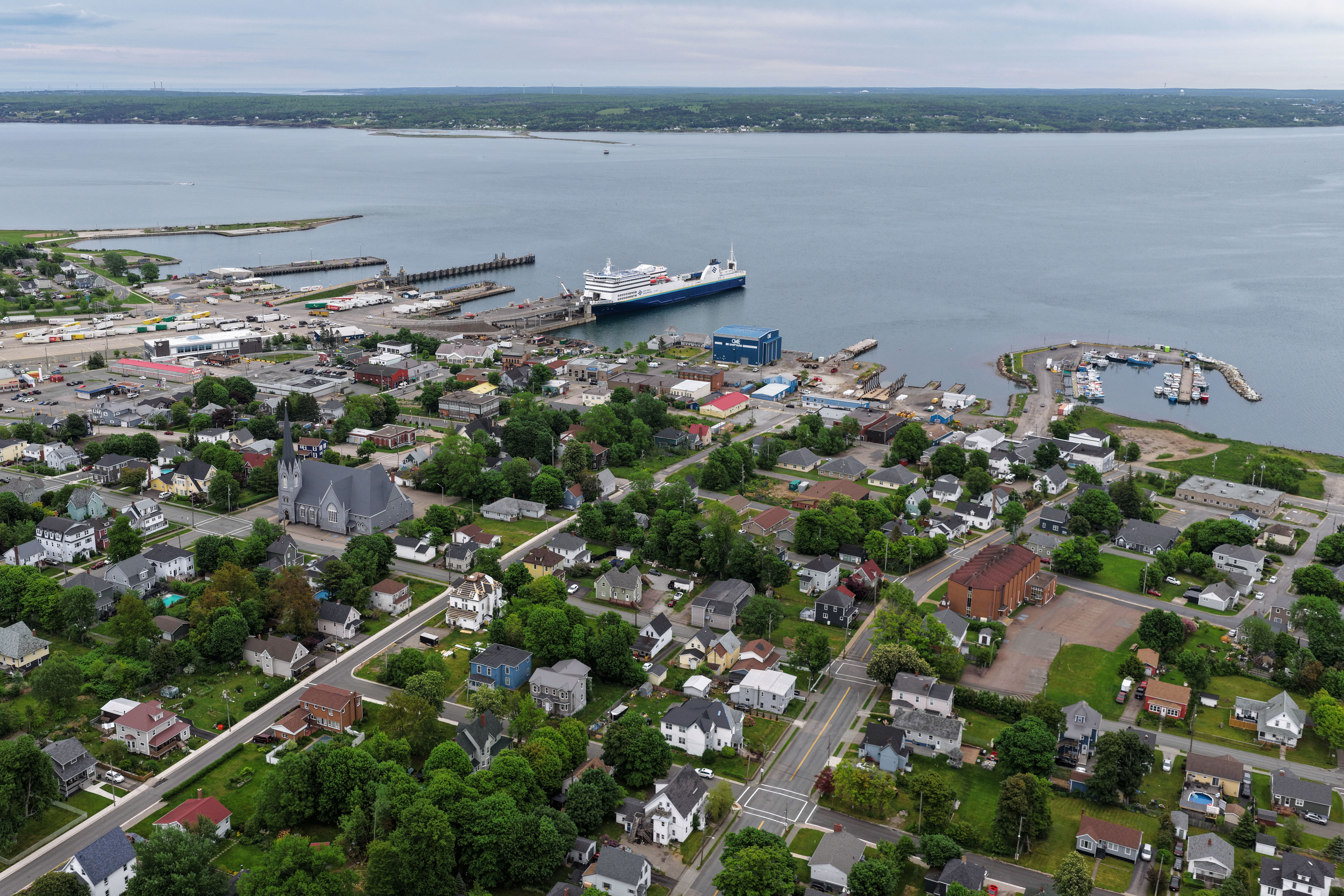
- North Sydney (2026)
- Motto: "Lux Et Labor"
- Location of North Sydney, Nova Scotia
- Coordinates: 46°13′10″N 60°15′29″W
- Country: Canada
- Province: Nova Scotia
- Regional Municipality: Cape Breton Regional Municipality
- Settled: 1785
- Incorporated Town: April 24, 1885
- Amalgamated: August 1, 1995

Population (2016)
  - Total: 5,699
- Time zone: UTC−04:00 (AST)
  - Summer (DST): UTC−03:00 (ADT)
- Canadian Postal code: B2A
- Area code(s): 902 & 782
- Highways: Hwy 105 (TCH); Hwy 125; Route 305

North Sydney is a former town and current community in Nova Scotia's Cape Breton Regional Municipality.

Located on the north side of Sydney Harbour, along the eastern coast of Cape Breton Island, North Sydney is an important port in Atlantic Canada, serving as the western terminus of the Marine Atlantic ferry service. It acts as the marine link for the Trans-Canada Highway to Newfoundland and is often termed "The Gateway To Newfoundland" for that reason.

Marine Atlantic ferries currently operate from North Sydney's terminal to the ports of Channel-Port aux Basques and Argentia. The Crown Corporation is one of the largest employers in the area.

== History ==
Historical population
Year	Pop.	±%
1871	1,200	—
1881	1,520	+26.7%
1891	2,513	+65.3%
1901	4,646	+84.9%
1911	5,418	+16.6%
1921	6,585	+21.5%
1931	6,139	−6.8%
1941	6,836	+11.4%
1951	7,354	+7.6%
1956	8,125	+10.5%
1961	8,657	+6.5%
1981	7,820	−9.7%
1986	7,472	−4.5%
1991	7,795	+4.3%
1996	7,541	−3.3%
2001	6,843	−9.3%
2006	6,552	−4.3%
2011	6,048	−7.7%
2016	5,699	−5.8%

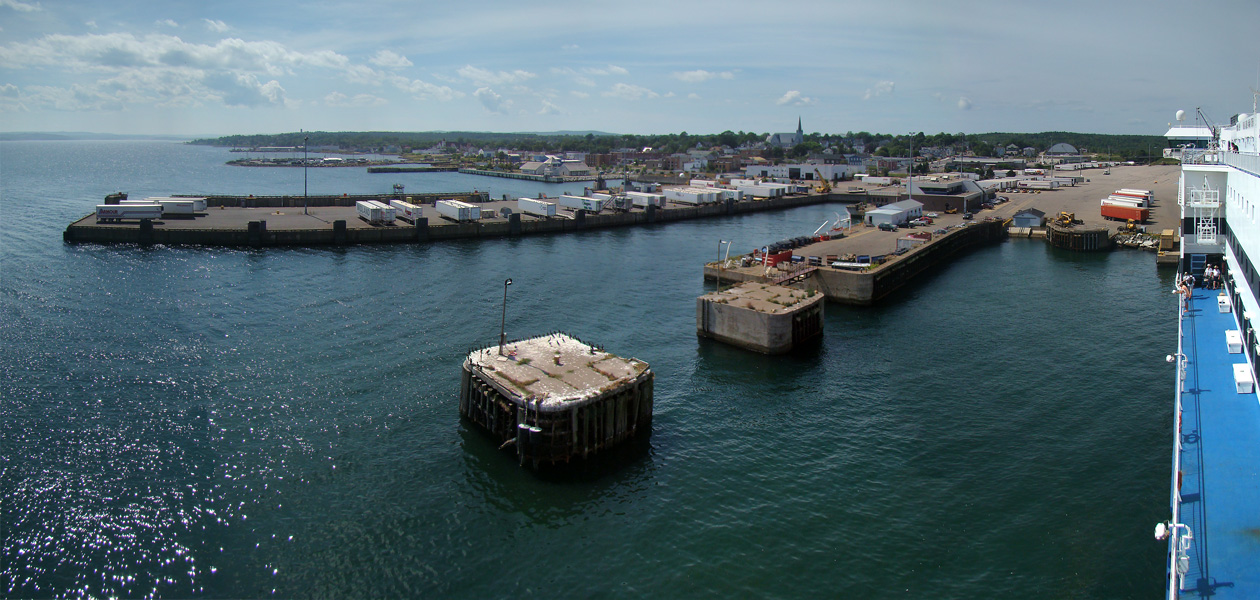
North Sydney harbour

European and Loyalist settlers established the first permanent European settlement at North Sydney around 1785. The original Mi'kmaq name for the area, Kweso'mkiaq, means "sandy point."

It emerged as a major shipbuilding centre in the early 19th century, building many brigs and brigantines for the English market, later moving on to larger barques, and in 1851 to the full-rigged Lord Clarendon, the largest wooden ship ever built in Cape Breton. Wooden shipbuilding declined in the 1860s, but the same decade saw the arrival of increasing numbers of steamships, drawn to North Sydney for bunker coal. By 1870 it was the fourth largest port in Canada dealing in ocean-going vessels, in part because the Western Union cable office had been established here in 1875. The community was incorporated on 24 April 1885 as a town within Cape Breton County. The railway came to Cape Breton Island in 1891. At this time there were 2,513 people in North Sydney, as compared to 2,417 in Sydney.

In 1898 North Sydney was chosen by the Reid-Newfoundland Company as the Canadian mainland terminal for a ferry service to Newfoundland; in June of that year the SS Bruce sailed from Port Aux Basques as the first ship to make that run.

=== World wars ===
During the First and Second World Wars, North Sydney played an important role in the relay of information from Europe to both Ottawa and Washington, D.C. Its Western Union Cable office was where coded messages arrived from overseas, and were then relayed on to the rest of North America.

On the morning of November 10, 1918, the office received a top-secret coded message from Europe stating that effective at 11 am on the next day (November 11, 1918), all fighting would cease on land, sea and in the air. This meant that the people of North Sydney, in particular Mrs. Annie Butler Smith, were the first to know of the end of the Great War. It is reported that on the night on November 10, 1918, over 200 servicemen marched through the streets of the town to celebrate the end of the war, one day before the rest of the world knew.

=== United States Navy ===
During the Great War, the United States Navy operated an air base in North Sydney. The base was primarily used as a landing/launching area for seaplanes. Known as NAS North Sydney the base was originally located at Indian Beach while more permanent facilities were built at nearby Kelly's Beach (now called Munro Park). The base was given the Naval postal address of "139 FPO New York" and the signal code "ALML". In command was Lt. Robert Donahue of the U.S. Coast Guard who operated under the direction of U.S. Navy Lt. Richard E. Byrd who was based in Halifax. The Kelly's Beach base closed in early 1919 but was reactivated by the Royal Canadian Air Force during World War II.

=== German U Boats ===
During the Second World War, on the night of October 13, 1942, the SS Caribou (a passenger ferry) left North Sydney harbour for Port aux Basques with 237 on board. At 3:40 am on the morning of October 14, the Caribou was hit by a single torpedo on her starboard side; 136 people perished.

== Filmography ==
Although North Sydney does not have a very developed arts community, it has served as the backdrop for at least five movies.

In 1995, scenes for Margaret's Museum were filmed in the town. Most were shot on King Street, where a house was used as a mine manager's house. In 1999, two films were shot in North Sydney. First, was New Waterford Girl. Downtown North Sydney was used to represent downtown New Waterford in the 1970s.

The other film from this year was a CBC made-for-TV movie named Win Again, starring Gordon Pinsent. This time, North Sydney posed as a small town in Newfoundland. The closing scene of the movie has a nice shot of the whole town, taken from a large crane from the downtown area.

== Notable people ==
- Paul Andrea, retired NHL hockey player
- Norm Batherson, retired hockey player
- Flash Hollett, retired NHL hockey player
- Flora MacDonald, former federal cabinet minister
- Arthur B. McDonald, Nobel laureate in the field of physics
- Cat Power (aka Haley Rogers), professional wrestler
- Harold Russell, Academy Award–winning actor
- Bobby Smith, retired NHL hockey player
- Clifford Shaw Thompson, 15th Canadian Surgeon General

== Notable connections ==
- Academy Award winning actors and siblings Warren Beatty and Shirley MacLaine were born to drama teacher Kathlyn Corinne who was born in North Sydney.
