= Harry Merville Jacques =

Colonel Harry Merville Jacques DSO, MD (12 November 1873 – 5 March 1956) was the 8th Canadian Surgeon General.

== Biography ==
Jacques joined the Non-Permanent Active Militia as a Lieutenant with the 68th (King's County) Regiment in 1905, and the following year joined the Permanent Active Militia Medical Corps (PAMC).

With the outbreak of World War I, he was Taken on Strength of the CEF in 1915, and was sent overseas with 2nd Division, PAMC. The following year, he was awarded the Distinguished Service Order "for his conspicuous gallantry and devotion to duty." In particular, he was noted as having "supervised the clearing of the front and [controlling] the work of the advanced and main dressing stations with great skill and personal courage."

Colonel Jacques died on March 5, 1956, at the age of 83.
