= William Lawrence Coke =

Former surgeon general of Canada

Brigadier W.L. Coke OBE, CD, MD (5 April 1905 – 12 August 1989) was the 16th Canadian Surgeon General.

== Biography ==
Born in Watford, Ontario, William L. was educated at the University of Western Ontario, where he graduated with a medical degree in 1928.

Following medical school, Coke joined the Royal Canadian Army Medical Corps (RCAMC) as a lieutenant in 1929. He was promoted to captain in 1930, major in 1935 and lieutenant-colonel in 1940.

As a lieutenant-colonel, Coke was posted to 10th Field Ambulance in 1940 and was sent overseas with the unit that same year. He remained with the 10th until 1943; at which time, he was transferred to the Mediterranean with the Canadian Army.

In 1942, he was next posted to the 24th Canadian Field Ambulance, as Commanding Officer, while it was stationed at Camp Aldershot, in England. Under his command, the 24th "sailed from Liverpool on 27 October 1943" and arrived the following month. They first saw action during the Italian Campaign in January 1944 near Ortona. The following month, "in one town a German Teller mine was set off creating a crater full of civilian casualties. Lieutenant-Colonel Coke confirmed [Sergeant Bill] Payette's respect when in his booming voice he ordered, "Back lads, back lads! This is a job for me!" and he went alone into the potentially dangerous hole." It was after this event that Lieutenant-Colonel Coke was reportedly injured, and had to be replaced as commanding officer. The following month, he assumed command of 4th Canadian Field Ambulance.

In August 1944, Coke was promoted to colonel and appointed an Assistant Director Medical Services (Army). He remained in the position, in Italy, until 1945; at which time he was transferred to France with the Canadian Army, and stayed there until his return to Canada in 1946.

He became Director General Medical Services (Army) in 1947, and remained in the position until his retirement from the military in 1952.

After retiring, Dr. Coke became a member of the Canadian Pension Commission from 1952 to 1963. He was also on staff at the Veterans' Hospital in Victoria, British Columbia from 1963 until his retirement from practice in 1971.

Brigadier Coke died 12 August 1989 at the age of 84.
