= Hugh McKay =

Hugh McKay may refer to:

- Hugh Victor McKay (1865–1926), Australian inventor and industrialist
- Hugh McKay (footballer) (1883–1971), Australian rules footballer
- Randy McKay (Hugh Randall McKay, born 1967), Canadian ice hockey player

== See also ==
- Hugh Mackay (disambiguation)
