= John Wilmer Browning Barr =

Canadian general

Major-General John Wilmer Browning Barr CMM, KStJ, CD, QHP, MD, CM, DHA (7 December 1916 – 25 April 2007) was the 25th Canadian Surgeon General.

== Early life and education ==
Born in Lanark, Ontario, Barr was educated at Queen's University, where he graduated with a Medical Degree in 1940. He also completed post-graduate studies in Hospital Administration at the University of Toronto from 1957 to 1959.

== Career ==
Barr joined the Canadian Officers' Training Corps (COTC) while attending medical school, in 1934. In 1940, after a brief period of employment at the Ottawa Civic Hospital, "he joined the Royal Canadian Army Medical Corps [(RCAMC)] [in the rank of Lieutenant] and was posted to the 23rd Field Ambulance" as a medical officer. At the time he joined, the 23rd was stationed on Porter's Island in Ottawa, Ontario. Shortly after Barr joined the 23rd, the unit was moved to Camp Derbert, in Nova Scotia and the following year, was sent overseas to England.

Over the course of the next two years, he was posted to different units to temporarily replace their Regimental Medical Officers. One such unit was the North Nova Scotia Highlanders, then stationed in Aldershot, England (several different periods in 1941). Another, in 1942, was 9 Canadian Infantry Brigade, where he was attached to the Highland Light Infantry of Canada, which was stationed in Loch Ailort, Scotland at the time.

In the fall of 1943, Barr received his first permanent posting as Regimental Medical Officer with the Highland Light Infantry of Canada. Though, the following year, he was posted to "Headquarters, 3 Canadian Infantry Division, as the Staff Learner in the Office of the [Assistant Director of Medical Services (Army)]." That summer, after visiting the 23rd and seeing the number of casualties (largely from the Highland Light Infantry of Canada) that his former colleagues were dealing with, he asked his superiors to be sent to a field ambulance unit; his request was granted and he was sent to 22nd Field Ambulance. Barr contextualizes his reasoning for this decision within his autobiography, From Barnyard to Battlefield and Beyond: The Story of a Military Medical Officer, when he states that: "If I stayed [in the position at the office of the Assistant Director of Medical Services (Army)] I would never know [what went on at the front], and the war might end without my ever experiencing the task for which I had joined the Army – to aid the soldiers directly."

In February 1945, Barr was promoted to major and posted back to the 23rd Field Ambulance as a company commander; and was quickly placed in the position of Second-in-Command (2/IC) of the unit. Three months later, the war was over and he married Nursing Matron Marion Sarah Crawford, who he had met during his final years of medical school while working at the Kingston Psychiatric Hospital where Marion was the Superintendent of Nurses. Marion had also joined the RCAMC, though in 1942, in the rank of lieutenant, and she served with several units during the war, including the 12th Canadian General Hospital. Shortly after their wedding, Barr returned to his unit, which was then stationed in the Netherlands, as the commanding officer. He remained in the position for several months until he was posted to 6 Canadian Field Dressing Station as the commanding officer.

Upon returning to Canada in 1946, Barr was posted to the headquarters of the Prairie Command as a deputy commander and medical officer in Winnipeg, Manitoba. The following year, he was posted to the RCAMC School at Borden, in Barrie, Ontario as Chief Instructor. He remained in the position until 1951; at which time, he was sent to England on a Senior Officers' course. The following year, he was posted as commanding officer to 79 Field Ambulance, stationed in Hanover, Germany, "in support of the Canadian Brigade with the NATO force in Germany."

After returning to Canada in 1954, Barr was appointed assistant director of Medical Services (Army); remaining in the position until 1957, when he returned to university for a brief period. In 1959, newly promoted to colonel, Barr was posted as commanding officer to the Kingston Military Hospital. Two years later, he was posted back to the staff of the Surgeon General as Assistant Surgeon General (Personnel). He remained in the position until 1964; at which time, he was posted to the National Defence College in Kingston, Ontario, as a student. Following this posting, Barr was promoted to brigadier-general in 1966 and appointed Deputy Surgeon General (Administration). He held his position until 1970, when he was promoted to major-general and appointed Surgeon General.

== Later life and death ==
Barr retired from the military in 1973, and became the registrar of the Medical Council of Canada, a position he held until 1981. He also held the honorary position of Colonel Commandant of Royal Canadian Medical Service (RCMS) from 1976 to 1998. It was during this appointed that he forged a friendship with Her Majesty, Queen Elizabeth, the Queen Mother.

Along with publishing his autobiography From Barnyard to Battlefield and Beyond: The Story of a Military Medical Officer, he also published a biography on his wife entitled Marion's Life.

Barr established two bursaries at his alma mater, one of which was in his wife's honour – the Marion Sarah Barr Memorial Bursary. Barr set this bursary up in 1993 and is to be "awarded on the basis of financial need to a student in the final year of the Bachelor of Nursing Science program. The candidate will be a caring individual who puts the needs of the patient first", and the other was in honour of The Queen Mother– the Queen Elizabeth, The Queen Mother Award – which was awarded to "students entering the first year of the Bachelor of Nursing Science program…on the basis of financial need and academic achievement, as well as either employment as nursing assistants or proven involvement in extracurricular activities such as volunteer work for humanitarian causes."

Major-General Barr died 25 April 2007 at the age of 90.
