= Charles Philip Fenwick =

14th Canadian Surgeon General (1891–1954)

- Born: July 10, 1891; St. John's, Newfoundland
- Died: March 20, 1954 (aged 62)

Major-General Charles Philip Fenwick CB, CBE, MC, ED, MD (10 July 1891 – 20 March 1954) was the 14th Canadian Surgeon General.

== Military career ==
Born in St. John's, Colony of Newfoundland, Charles Philip was educated at the University of Toronto, where he graduated with a Medical Degree in 1916.

Following graduation, Fenwick joined the Canadian Army and was placed in the Canadian Army Medical Corps. In 1917, he was promoted to the rank of lieutenant colonel and was [appointed] the Commanding Officer of the 2nd Field Ambulance. Two years later, he was awarded the Military Cross for "his actions at the Battle of Amiens."

At the end of the war, Fenwick took up practice in Niagara Falls, Ontario from 1920 to 1923 before settling in Toronto.

With the outbreak of World War II, Fenwick re-enlisted in the military, and was sent overseas in 1939 with the [1st Division] and his subsequent career saw him in all Canadian theatres of World War II."

In 1943, he was appointed Deputy Director Medical Services (Army) and in 1945, Director General Medical Services (Army). He remained in the latter position until his retirement from the military in 1946.

Following his retirement, Fenwick became the chief of medical services for the Canadian Pacific Railway. He was also the president of the Defence Medical Association from 1946 to 1947.

Major-General Fenwick died 20 March 1954 at the age of 62.
