= Raymond Myers Gorssline =

Brigadier Raymond Myers Gorssline OStJ, DSO, MD

12th Canadian Surgeon General

Personal details
- Born: 28 July 1885 Bloomfield, Ontario, Canada
- Died: 1968 (aged 82–83)

Brigadier Raymond Myers Gorssline DSO, OStJ, MD (28 July 1885 – 1968) was the 12th Canadian Surgeon General.

== Biography ==
Born in Bloomfield, Ontario, on 28 July 1885, Raymond Myers Gorssline was the son of Rickerson Cronk Gorssline and Helena Catherine (Myers) Gorssline. Raymond was educated at the University of Toronto, where he graduated with a Medical Degree.

Gorssline joined the Permanent Active Militia Medical Corps in 1910 and in 1914 was Taken on Strength as a lieutenant in the Canadian Army Medical Corps (CAMC). His first posting was with "No. 1 Canadian Field Ambulance"; where he remained until 1916, when he was appointed "Deputy Assistant Director of Medical Services [(Army)] for the 3rd Division with the rank of [Major]." Subsequently, in 1918, he was promoted to Brigadier-General and appointed "[Deputy Assistant Director of Medical Services (Army)] of the Canadian Corps."

After the war, Gorssline stayed in the military; in particular, he was the District Medical Officer for 6th Military District from 1927 to 1933 and for 4th Military District from 1933 to 1939. By the beginning of World War II he was appointed Director General of Medical Services (Army); remaining in the position until 1942. His tenure saw the formation of sister medical services in the rapidly expanding Royal Canadian Navy and Royal Canadian Air Force.

Christopher McCreery, author of The Maple Leaf and the White Cross, states that Gorssline's work as Surgeon General during World War II "helped place St. John Ambulance at the forefront of first aid training throughout the conflict." He further states that, "Gorssline had served as the first provincial commissioner for the brigade in Quebec from 1936 to 1942 and later served as Hospitaller and Almoner for the Commandery. Having first been introduced to St. John Ambulance first aid during the First World War, Gorssline would be a staunch promoter of first aid training and the St. John Ambulance throughout his life." His work for St. John Ambulance resulted in his becoming an Officer of the Venerable Order of the Hospital of St. John of Jerusalem in 1935.

He died in 1968.
