= 11 (Victoria) Field Ambulance =

11 (Victoria) Field Ambulance is a unit of the Canadian Forces Health Services (CFHS) Group assigned to 1 Health Services Group (1 HSG) in support of 39 Canadian Brigade Group (39 CBG), a component of the 3rd Canadian Division, and Maritime Forces (Pacific). The unit charged with conducting individual, platoon and collective training and provides medical support to other units undergoing training, as well as operating a Brigade Medical Station (BMS) for brigade- level exercises in various training areas in British Columbia and Washington State. Operating the BMS is done in conjunction with 12 (Vancouver) Field Ambulance, which illustrates the close cooperation that exists between the two units.

The unit has a long and distinguished history that lives up to the former Royal Canadian Army Medical Corps (RCAMC) motto - faithful in adversity. It is the latest in a line of Victoria army medical units dating back to 13th Canadian Field Ambulance of World War I.

== World War I ==
13 Field Ambulance (Fd Amb) was mobilized in Victoria on 22 March 1916 and departed Canada July 1 on the S.S. Matagama. The unit arrived in England July 9 where they received training in stretcher drill with and without ambulances and practical field ambulance work in conjunction with infantry units. The unit was fully equipped with tentage, medical equipment and ambulances and departed from Southampton, August 12 for the front lines in Belgium.

- The Battle of the Somme was the first heavy action seen by 13 Fd Amb and the Canadian Corps The battle was brutal with the Canadians suffering a total of 23,734 casualties.
- The Canadian victory at Vimy Ridge has gone down as one of the great feats in military history. 13 Fd Amb was the Corps clearing centre for walking wounded during Vimy and saw 4,360 casualties during the full three days of the battle. The largest number held at any one time was 2,650. The clearing of casualties from the front lines to the advanced dressing stations was very rapid although evacuation rearward was delayed due to a lack of ambulances
- The conditions facing the medical service Passchendaele were daunting yet despite a high number of casualties (16,404) the medical service proved to be up to the task with 12,403 coming between 26 Oct through 11 Nov. General Currie had predicted 16,000 casualties would be the result of the battle and he was very close in his estimate.

== World War II ==
On September 2, 1939, 13 Field Ambulance, now quartered at the Bay Street Armoury, was mobilized with six officers and forty other ranks from the Militia. On October 27, 1941, the unit was renamed "No. 13 Light Field Ambulance" and tasked to support the 5th Canadian Armoured Division overseas. The unit departed Canada in November 1942 for England where it received its full complement of vehicles and other equipment. In January 1943 the unit was designated 13 Canadian Field Dressing Station providing the nucleus, with attached field surgical teams and field transfusion teams, for an advanced surgical centre.

Between October 1943 and January 1945 the unit supported the Canadian 5th Armoured Division in the Italian campaign seeing action at Ortona, the Liri Valley and the Gothic Line. In February 1945 the unit redeployed from Italy by road and ship to support 1st Canadian Corps in clearing western Holland of the enemy. VE Day was declared on May 8, 1945, and 13 Canadian Field Dressing Station remained in situ until June 30 when it became the first Canadian medical unit to be disbanded.

== Post War ==
On 29 October 1954, 13 Field Ambulance CA (M) and 46 Field Hygiene Section RCAMC CA (M) were amalgamated to form 25 Medical Company RCAMC CA(M). During this period members of the unit participated in numerous peace keeping missions and served on tours in Bosnia and Croatia. The unit was re-designated in 1979 as 11 (Victoria) Medical Company. In 1994 the unit was accorded the Freedom of the Municipality of Saanich

== 2000 to Present ==
In 2007 the unit was renamed 11(Victoria) Field Ambulance. During this period unit personnel have been involved with in a variety of domestic operations and has seen members deploy to operations overseas, including Afghanistan, Sudan and various NATO missions across Eastern Europe.

== Notable members ==
=== World War I ===
- Sir Frederick Grant Banting (November 14, 1891 – February 21, 1941) was attached to 13 Field Ambulance near the end of the War. He later was awarded the Nobel Prize as a co-discoverer of Insulin.

=== World War II ===
- Lieutenant Colonel Kenning as Commanding Officer, mobilized from the militia to form the basis of 13 Field Ambulance on September 2, 1939.
- Lieutenant Colonel Mustard as Commanding Officer of the 12 Field Ambulance in June, 1940 to support 3 Canadian Division overseas.
- Captain M.J.T. Dohan was in the 13 Field Ambulance (then renamed the No. 13 Light Field Ambulance) from 1941 to late-summer of 1942. He later became Honorary Colonel of 11 (Victoria) Field Ambulance, the successor to the 13 Field Ambulance.

=== Post World War II–Present ===
- Lieutenant Colonel Kelly James was a Commanding Officer who later became the area surgeon.
- Lieutenant Colonel Maureen Fensom, another Commanding Officer, transferred to the Regular Force. He took part in the First Gulf War, became Commanding Officer of 1 Field Ambulance, became Director of Medical Operations, and finally, Commander of 1 Health Services Group
