= Donald Gordon Medd Nelson =

Canadian military personnel (1914–1989)

- Born: June 28, 1914; Toronto, Ontario, Canada
- Died: February 22, 1989 (aged 74)
- Education: University of Toronto
- Occupations: doctor, officer, administrator

Major-General Donald Gordon Medd Nelson CStJ, CD, QHS, MD, DPH, FACPM (28 June 1914 – 22 February 1989) was the 23rd Canadian Surgeon General.

== Early years ==
Born in Toronto, Ontario, Donald G.M., was educated at the University of Toronto. He received a Medical Degree in 1939 and a Graduate Diploma in Public Health in 1948.

== Career ==
In 1940, "he enrolled in the Royal Canadian Army Medical Corps, and in November of that year, he was transferred to the newly formed Royal Canadian Air Force Medical Branch." From 1940 to 1945, Nelson worked "as a Medical Officer at various RCAF stations in Canada."

Flight Lieutenant Nelson was "appointed President of the RCAF Medical Board in London, England" in 1945. The following year he was promoted to Squadron Leader, and "appointed as Senior Medical Officer at RCAF Station Hospital Rockcliffe, Ontario." He left his post for a brief period of time in 1947-1948, and upon returning was promoted to Wing Commander.

In 1952, Nelson was promoted to Group Captain and "appointed Deputy Director of Medical Services for the RCAF on the staff of the Director General [of] Medical Services (Air) at Air Force Headquarters" in Ottawa, Ontario.

He "assumed command of the RCAF Institute of Aviation Medicine in Toronto", Ontario in 1957, and four years later, was "posted to London, England and appointed Medical Liaison Officer at the Canadian Joint Staff."

In 1964, Nelson was promoted to the rank of Air Commodore, and appointed "Deputy Surgeon General (Professional)." He served in that position for four years until 1968 when he was promoted to Major-General, and appointed Surgeon General. Nelson remained in the position until his retirement from the military in 1970.

== Retirement ==
After retiring, Dr. Nelson joined the Medical Services Department at Guelph University, until his retirement in 1982. He also served as president of the Aerospace Medical Association in 1971.

== Death ==
Major-General Nelson died 22 February 1989 at the age of 74.
