= John Fotheringham =

John Fotheringham may refer to:

- John Knight Fotheringham, British historian
- John Taylor Fotheringham, Canadian surgeon general
