= Clifford Shaw Thompson =

15th Canadian Surgeon General

Brigadier C.S. Thompson OBE, CD, (28 December 1899 – 6 August 1983) was the 15th Canadian Surgeon General.

Born in North Sydney, Nova Scotia, Clifford S. was educated at Mount Allison University, where he graduated with a Bachelor of Arts Degree, as well as McGill University, where he graduated with a Medical Degree in 1925.

During World War I, Thompson, at the age of 18 years, enlisted as Gunner with the 10th (Halifax) Siege Battery, 3rd Brigade, Canadian Garrison Artillery (CGA). After the war, he enrolled in medical school. After graduating, he was posted as the Medical Officer (Non-Permanent Active Militia) of 4th Divisional Train, and the Royal Montreal Regiment. In 1939 he returned 10th (Halifax) Siege Battery for a brief period, as Medical Officer. He remained in the position until 1940; at which time he was posted to 6th Field Ambulance, a non-permanent militia until of the Royal Canadian Army Medical Corps (RCAMC).

With the outbreak of World War II, Thompson was called to Active Service in 1941 with the rank of Lieutenant-Colonel, took command of No. 6 Casualty Clearing Station, and was sent overseas in 1942 with Station. He "was subsequently appointed to command No. 1 General Hospital 9 August 1943, and received promotion to the rank of Colonel."

In 1944, Thompson was appointed Assistant Director of Medical Services (Army), continuing in the position until 1945. At which time, he was appointed "Commandant of No. 11 Canadian General Hospital, in which capacity he served until his return to Canada."

Following the end of the war, Thompson was promoted to Brigadier and appointed Director General (Army), in 1946. He remained in this position until 1947, when he retired from the military.

Brigadier Thompson died 6 August 1983 at the age of 83.
