= Kenneth Adams Hunter =

17th and 20th Canadian Surgeon General

Kenneth Adams Hunter OBE, CStJ, CD, QHP, (born 28 August 1904) was the 17th and 20th Canadian Surgeon General.

== Biography ==
Born in London, Ontario, Kenneth A. Hunter was educated at the University of Western Ontario, where he graduated with a Medical Degree in 1930.

During his studies, Hunter was a member of the Non-Permanent Army Militia (NPAM) and was in the Machine Gun Corps from 1922 to 1926. In 1927, he joined the regular force in the Machine Gun Corps as a Lieutenant and remained with this corps until 1930; at which time, Hunter joined the Royal Canadian Army Medical Corps (RCAMC). He was promoted to Captain in 1931, Major in 1939, Lieutenant-Colonel in 1940, Colonel in 1943.

During World War II, Hunter served with the RCAMC throughout Europe from 1940 to 1943, and for his service with 2nd Field Ambulance during the attack on Dieppe, he was Mentioned in Dispatch in 1942. In 1945, Hunter was also awarded the Order of the British Empire.

Hunter was promoted to Brigadier in 1952 and appointed Director General Medical Services (Army). In 1957 Brigadier Hunter was appointed Director General Joint Medical Services. This was prelude to his promotion in 1959 to be Major-General and assume the new position of Surgeon General, which he helped create by the integration of the medical services of the Royal Canadian Navy, Canadian Army and Royal Canadian Air Force, to form a single professional-technical organization, the Canadian Forces Medical Service (CFMS). Hunter retired soon afterwards.
