= Timothy McLean =

Timothy McLean may refer to:

- Tim McLean (1985–2008), Canadian murder victim
- Timothy Blair McLean (1910–1982), Canadian Surgeon General
