= Hans W. Jung =

Hans W. Jung OMM, CStJ, CD, QHP, MD, MA, FRCPSC(hon) (born October 31, 1958) was the 37th Canadian Surgeon General.

Born in South Korea, Jung immigrated to Canada with his family in 1970, at the age of 11. Jung graduated from the University of Toronto with a medical degree in 1984. He also obtained an MA in Leadership from the Royal Roads University, in British Columbia.

Jung joined the Canadian Forces in 1981 while attending medical school. His first posting was to Canadian Forces Base (CFB) Esquimalt, in British Columbia, where he served as the Medical Officer for both the base and HMCS Provider.

Jung was next posted to the Canadian Air Task Group (Middle East) Qatar as the Senior Medical Officer, in 1990. He remained in that posting "throughout the air campaign of the 1991 Persian Gulf War."

After returning to Canada in 1993, Jung was posted to the National Defence Headquarters (NDHQ), Medical Inspection Room, as a medical Detachment Commander. In 1995, he was tasked to Air Command Headquarters in Winnipeg, Manitoba. During his time there he "assumed multiple roles that included the posts of the Command Flight Surgeon and A1 Medical Operations." Jung was subsequently posted to Maritime Forces Pacific Headquarters in Esquimalt, BC, as the Maritime Pacific Surgeon in 1997."

Jung was appointed "Maritime Command Surgeon and Medical Advisor to the Chief of Maritime Staff at NDHQ." in 2000, and the following year, he "assumed responsibilities as Director of Health Services Operations, Director Health Services Personnel and Deputy Surgeon General." During those years, he led efforts to achieve civilian recognition and integration of Physician Assistants in Canadian health care.

In 2009, Jung was promoted to the rank of Commodore and appointed Surgeon General and Commander Canadian Forces Health Services Group. He remained in that position until 2012, at which time he retired from the military.

After retiring, Jung joined the medical staff of the Veterans Medical Clinic at the Orleans Centrum Medical Centre, in Orleans, Ontario and was appointed to the faculty of Health Sciences Campaign Cabinet at Queen's University. In addition, Jung became a member of the board of directors for the Canadian Institute for Military and Veterans Health Research, and the board of directors of the Perley and Rideau Veterans' Health Centre. Furthermore, he has served as a member of the board of governors for the Royal Military College of Canada. He was named one of Canada's top 25 immigrants in 2012 and was bestowed an Honorary Fellowship by the Royal College of Physicians and Surgeons of Canada in 2020.
