= Admiral Knight =

Admiral Knight may refer to:

- Austin M. Knight (1854–1927), U.S. Navy admiral
- Charles Joseph Knight (1931–2023), Royal Canadian Navy rear admiral
- John Knight (Royal Navy officer) (1747–1831), British Royal Navy admiral

== See also ==
- Walter Knight-Adkin (1880–1957), Archdeacon of the Royal Navy
