= Richard Howell Roberts =

6th Surgeon General of Canada (1916–1986)

Rear-Admiral Richard Howell Roberts CD QHP FRCPC FACP
- Born: 1916; England
- Died: March 3, 1986 (aged 69–70); Ottawa, Ontario, Canada
- Military career
- Allegiance: Canada
- Branch: Royal Canadian Navy
- Service years: 1948–1976
- Rank: Surgeon Rear-Admiral
- Commands: Surgeon General of Canada 1973-1976; Commanding Officer of National Defence Medical Centre 1971-1973
- Awards: Canadian Forces' Decoration, Queen's Honorary Physician

Richard Howell Roberts, CD, QHP, ChB, MRCS, LRCP, FRCPC, FACP (1916 - 3 March 1986) was the 25th Canadian Surgeon General.

Roberts graduated with a Medical Degree from the Liverpool University in 1938. He married Dr. Maureen (née McWilliams) Roberts in 1940. The couple immigrated to Canada in 1948, and Roberts subsequently joined the Royal Canadian Navy. He served on several of Her Majesty's Canadian Ship (HMCS) over the course of his career, including HMCS Stadacona in 1949.

In 1964/1965, he and his wife “joined a medical expedition to Easter Island." While on this expedition, Roberts received word that he would be posted next to Ottawa at the National Defence Medical Centre (NDMC). From 1968 to 1971, Roberts was Deputy Surgeon General (Professional) before returning to National Defence Medical Centre as the commanding officer.

Roberts was appointed Surgeon General in 1973 and remained in the position until retirement in 1976.

After retiring, Roberts “served on the Aviation Medical Review Board, Department of National Health and Welfare. He was [also] an Honorary Associate Professor, Dalhousie University and University of Ottawa.”

Rear-Admiral Roberts died 3 March 1986 at the age of 70.
