= Leslie Potter =

Leslie Potter may refer to:

- Leslie Potter (army officer) (1894–1964), officer of the New Zealand Military Forces
- Leslie Potter (rower) (1907–1971), British Olympic rower

== See also ==
- Jacob Leslie Potter (1877–?), Canadian surgeon general
