= Robert Dupuis =

Canadian Surgeon General (1928–2019)

Major-General Robert Dupuis CMM CStJ CD QHP FRCPC

Surgeon General
- In office 1982–1985

Personal details
- Born: 21 November 1928 Drummondville, Quebec, Canada
- Died: 28 January 2019 (aged 90)

Major-General Robert Dupuis (21 November 1928 – 28 January 2019) was the 28th Canadian Surgeon General.

== Biography ==
Born in Drummondville, Quebec, Robert was educated at Université Laval in Quebec City, where he graduated with a Medical Degree in 1951. He also completed post-graduate studies in 1961, 1964 and 1965 at the Montréal Military Hospital (Queen Mary's Hospital) and the Notre-Dame Hospital (both in Montreal, Quebec).

Dupuis joined the Royal Canadian Army Medical Corps (RCAMC) in 1956 and was posted to 3rd Battalion, the Canadian Guards, and was sent to Germany in 1957. He returned to Canada in 1961 and began post-graduate studies. However, in 1963 he halted his studies and went on a 6-month tour as medical officer with the 57th Canadian Signal Unit in the Congo – an experience that he greatly enjoyed.

Following his return to Canada in 1964, he continued his post-graduate studies, completing them in 1965; at which time, he was posted to the Canadian Forces Hospital in Kingston, Ontario, as assistant chief of medicine. He remained in the position until 1966, when he was posted to the Military Hospital in Gatineau, Québec. He was posted there for a brief period of time before being posted to the Military Hospital in Accra, Ghana as a specialist.

Dupuis returned to Canada in 1968 and was posted to the National Defence Medical Centre (NDMC) in Ottawa, Ontario, as assistant chief of medicine, and the following year, he was promoted to lieutenant-colonel. He remained in the position until 1972; at which time, he was appointed chief of medicine. In 1973, Dupuis was promoted to colonel. He was also appointed assistant professor at the University of Ottawa within the medical school that year, and associate professor the following year.

Dupuis was next promoted to brigadier-general in 1979 and appointed commandant of NDMC. He remained in the position until 1982; at which time, he was promoted to major-general and appointed surgeon general.

Dupuis retired from the military in 1985, and became a civilian medical specialist for NDMC, a position he held until his full retirement in 1995. He died on 28 January 2019, at the age of 90.
