= Umphrey =

Umphrey may refer to:

== People ==
- Umphrey Lee (1893–1958), American Methodist theologian
- Chainey Umphrey (born 1970), American gymnast
- Rich Umphrey (born 1958), American football player
- Stanley Gerald Umphrey Shier (1903–1968), Canadian Surgeon General

== Other uses ==
- Umphrey's McGee, band
- Provost Umphrey Stadium, stadium in Texas
