= Hugh Colin MacKay =

Brigadier-General Hugh Colin MacKay OMM CD QHP

Surgeon General
- In office 2015 – July 2017

Personal details
- Born: Shelburne, Nova Scotia, Canada

Hugh Colin MacKay was the 39th Canadian Surgeon General.

Originally from Shelburne Nova Scotia, he enrolled in the Canadian Armed Forces in 1983 and served as a Signal Officer with 4 Canadian Mechanized Brigade Group Headquarters and Signal Squadron in Germany, 1 Canadian Signal Regiment in Kingston, and the Directorate of Electronics Engineering and Maintenance in National Defence Headquarters. He subsequently trained as a physician at the University of Toronto and Queen's University before serving as a medical officer at CFB Kingston, with the 1st Canadian Divisional Headquarters and Signal Regiment, on a humanitarian assistance operation in Africa, as Base Surgeon in Shilo, Officer Commanding Medical Company and Brigade Surgeon with 2 Field Ambulance in Petawawa, and Disaster Assistance Response Team medical commander during the earthquake disaster relief mission to Turkey. After completing post-graduate training in Occupational Medicine and Public Health at the University of British Columbia, he served as Head of Operational Medicine and Project Director of the Biological Warfare Medical Countermeasures Project. In 2007, he was the Canadian Task Force Surgeon and Commanding Officer of the NATO Role 3 Multi-national Medical Unit in Kandahar Afghanistan. After serving as Command Surgeon to the Canadian operational commands, he sequentially served as Director Force Health Protection and Deputy Surgeon General. He was appointed Surgeon General, Commander Canadian Forces Health Services Group, and Head of the Royal Canadian Medical Service in 2015 and retired in July 2017.

He is an Honorary Physician to Her Majesty the Queen, an Officer of the Order of Military Merit, an Honorary Fellow of the Royal College of Physicians and Surgeons, and a trustee of the Canadian Medical Foundation (CMF).
