= Pierre Morisset =

Canadian Surgeon General

Pierre R. Morisset, CMM, CStJ, (born August 27, 1943) was the 32nd Canadian Surgeon General.

== Biography ==
Born in Sudbury, Ontario, Morisset was educated at the University of Ottawa, where he graduated with a Bachelor of Arts Degree (Pre-Med) in 1964, and a Medical Degree in 1972. Morisset also completed a master's degree in Health Administration, at the University of Ottawa, in 1981.

He joined the Royal Canadian Air Force as a pilot in 1961, under the Regular Officer Training Plan. After graduating in 1964, he served as a flying instructor until he was accepted in the Military Medical Training Plan at the rank of flight lieutenant, in 1967.

After his internship, in 1972, he was posted to Canadian Forces Base Ottawa as base surgeon, and promoted to major.

Morisset was next posted to the Canadian Forces Base in Lahr, Germany, as base surgeon and Command Flight Surgeon in 1976, and the following year was promoted to lieutenant-colonel. He remained in the position until 1979, when he returned to Canada to obtain his master's degree in Health Administration.

He was subsequently posted to the Directorate Medical Operations and Training at National Defence Headquarters in Ottawa, and upon promotion to colonel in 1982, became the Director.

Morisset returned to Lahr, Germany in 1985, as Command Surgeon for the Canadian Forces in Europe. He remained there until 1987, at which time he returned to Canada to attend the National Defence College in Kingston, Ontario.

In 1988, Morisset was promoted to brigadier-general and appointed deputy surgeon general. In 1992, at the age of 48, he was promoted to major-general and appointed surgeon general. He remained in the position until his retirement from the military in 1994.

After retiring, he worked as a medical administrator in the province of Québec, and as a consultant. He also chaired the Minister of Veterans Affairs’ Scientific Advisory Committee on Veterans’ Health. Morisset also served from 2010 to 2015 as Colonel Commandant of the Canadian Forces Medical Service, which in 2013 became the Royal Canadian Medical Service.
