= Jean Joseph Benoit =

Canadian surgeon general (1990–1992)

Major-General Jean Joseph Benoit CStJ CD QHP FRCPC

Surgeon General
- In office 1990–1992

Commandant, National Defence Medical Centre
- In office 1985–1989

Personal details
- Born: February 14, 1932 Rivière-du-Loup, Quebec, Canada
- Died: January 18, 2024 (aged 91)

Jean Joseph Benoit (February 14, 1932 – January 18, 2024) was the 31st Canadian Surgeon General.

== Early life ==
Born in Rivière-du-Loup, Quebec, Benoit was educated at Laval University, where he earned a Bachelor of Arts degree in 1950, and a Medical Doctorate in 1958. He also completed post-graduate studies in anesthesiology at the University of Toronto between 1962 and 1964.

== Career ==
Upon entering medical school in 1952, Benny, as Benoit was called by his colleagues, joined the Canadian Officer Training Corps (COTC). He was commissioned as a second lieutenant and attached to the 2nd Battalion of the Royal 22nd Regiment, and then sent to Germany.

In 1956, Benoit transferred from the Infantry to the Royal Canadian Air Force (RCAF). His first posting in 1958 was to a Pine Tree Line radar station in Parent, Quebec, as the station physician.

Benoit next was posted to RCAF Station Rockcliffe Hospital in 1959, "which was to become Canadian Forces Hospital Rockcliffe [CFH]. The staff of this hospital formed the nucleus of what was to become, [in 1961,] the new National Defence Medical Centre [NDMC] in Ottawa."

In 1962, Benoit was posted to CFH Churchill, Manitoba. Having completed his specialty training he was appointed chief of anesthesiology at Canadian Forces Hospital in Oromocto, New Brunswick. This hospital saw both civilian and military patients, and thus, the military physicians were also "members of the Oromocto General Hospital medical staff."

Benoit was promoted to colonel and appointed commandant of the Canadian Forces Hospital Valcartier, in Quebec, well as the chief of anesthesiology in 1974.

In 1976, Benoit was transferred to Ottawa as chief of the Department of Anesthesiology at the NDMC. In 1985, he was appointed commandant of NDMC and promoted brigadier-general.

Four years later, he "assumed command of the newly formed Canadian Forces Hospital and Medical Supply System with headquarters in Ottawa". In 1990 was promoted to major-general and appointed surgeon general. He remained in that position until his retirement in 1992.

== Death ==
Joseph died on 18 January 2024, at the age of 91.
