= John Thomas Clarke =

- Born: February 27, 1868; Foxboro, Ontario, Canada
- Died: November 28, 1947 (aged 79); Ottawa, Ontario, Canada
- Occupations: doctor, soldier, administrator

Colonel John Thomas Clarke CBE, CStJ, MD (February 27, 1868 – November 28, 1947) was the 9th Canadian Surgeon General.

Born in Foxboro, Ontario, Clarke was educated at the University of Toronto and McGill University. From 1897 to 1906, Clarke practiced medicine in Toronto, Ontario. During this period of time he worked "as associate coroner" for the City of Toronto.

Clarke joined the Non-Permanent Canadian Militia Medical Corps, "before the turn of the century" as a private, and "was commissioned Lieutenant in that Corps July 1, 1900". In 1907, he joined the permanent force as a captain. He was promoted to major in 1911 and appointed Assistant Director of Medical Services (Army).

At the beginning of the First World War, Clarke organized the first Canadian ambulance train which operated between Valcartier and Quebec. In 1914, newly promoted to lieutenant-colonel, he was sent overseas with No. 2 General Hospital. Clarke assumed command of the Canadian Special Hospital, in Ramsgate (Granville) England in 1916, and in 1918 Colonel Clarke was appointed Assistant Director of Medical Services and sent to Siberia.

At the end of the war, he continued on as Assistant Director of Medical Services (Army) in many provinces, including Montréal, Québec and Halifax, Nova Scotia.

From 1926 to 1927, Clarke was attached for seven months to the War Office in London, England. Three years later, he was appointed Director General Medical Services. He remained in the position until his retirement from the military in 1933.

After retiring, Clarke became the Director General of the Canadian Branch of the St. John Ambulance Association. At the same time, he was also the President of the Ottawa Branch of the St. John Ambulance Brigade.

Clarke died on 28 November 1947 at the age of 80.
