= John Louis Hubert Neilson =

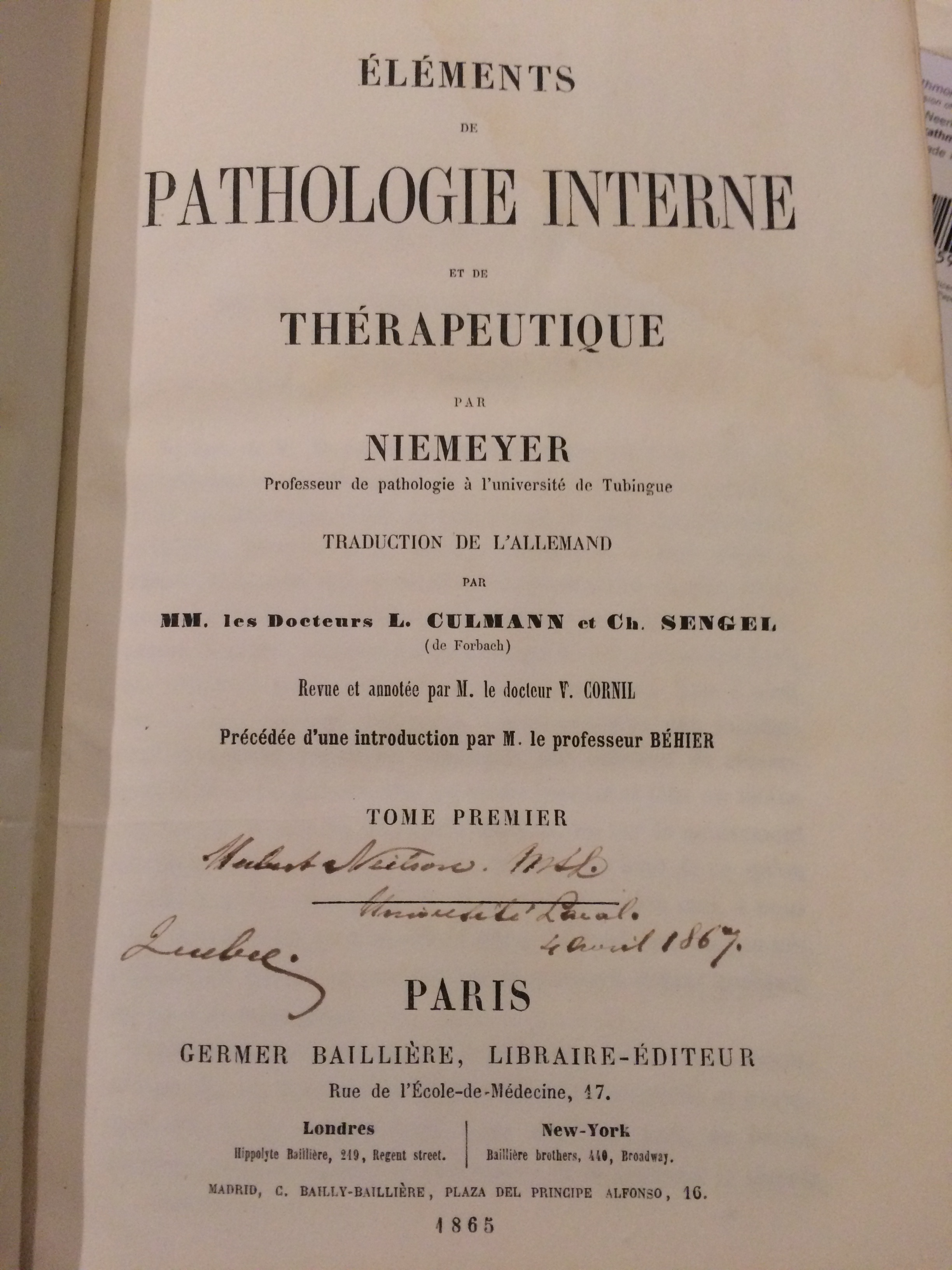
His book of internal pathology, when attending Laval University Medical School, April 4, 1867.

Colonel J.L.H. Neilson (1845–1925) was the 2nd Canadian Surgeon General and the first to hold the appointment of Director General Medical Services.

Born in Québec, John LH., grandson of politician and editor John Neilson, "was educated at St. Mary’s College, Montreal, Laval University and Royal Victoria Army Medical School."

Neilson was posted as Medical Officer of the Québec Garrison Artillery, in 1869. During the Wolseley Expedition (a part of the Red River Rebellion) from 1870 to 1871 "he served as a surgeon with the 2nd Québec Battalion of Riflemen", for which he was awarded the Canada General Service Medal. Neilson also served as a surgeon in Egypt during the Soudan Campaign from 1884 to 1885.

In 1898, he was appointed Director General of Medical Services, and remained in the position until his retirement from the military in 1903.

Neilson penned two books, the first entitled The Royal Canadian Volunteers, 1794-1802: a historical sketch, published in 1895, and Slavery in Old Canada before and after the conquest read before the Literary and Historical Society of Quebec, published in 1906.
