= 16 (Regina) Field Ambulance =

- Active: 1980–present
- Country: Canada
- Branch: Royal Canadian Medical Services
- Role: Medical
- Size: Company
- Part of: Canadian Forces Health Services Group
- Garrison/HQ: 1600 Elphinstone Street; Regina, Saskatchewan; S4X 1G2
- Motto(s): Militi Succurrimus (We Hasten to Aid the Soldier)
- March: Farmer's Boy

Commanders
- Colonel in Chief: The Princess Royal, formerly Queen Elizabeth The Queen Mother

16 (Regina) Field Ambulance is a Canadian Forces Primary Reserve medical unit in Regina, Saskatchewan, Canada.

== History ==
This unit has a long and distinguished history that lives up to the Medical Branch's tradition of being faithful in adversity. It is the latest in a line of Saskatchewan army medical units dating back to 21 Field Ambulance of World War I and 10 Field Ambulance of World War II.

=== World War II ===
From 1940 to 1941, the unit trained at Camp Dundurn, in preparation for deployment to England. Once deployed, the unit provided medical services, as well as successfully evacuating thousands of Canadian and Allied units.

=== Post-World War II to 1990 ===
In the early 1970s, the unit was disbanded along with all militia medical units across Canada, but was reformed as a Medical Company, as part of 16 Service Battalion, a combat service support unit, based out of Regina Garrison in Regina, Saskatchewan.

=== 1990–present ===
In the early 1990s, the unit received official detachment status for its detachment operating in Saskatoon, Saskatchewan, out of Sgt. Hugh Cairns VC Armoury. In 2004, the Canadian Forces Medical Service underwent a reorganization, and 16 Medical Company became its own unit again, and was renamed 16 (Regina) Field Ambulance.

== Royal Canadian Army Cadets ==
16 (Regina) Field Ambulance is affiliated with 328 Royal Canadian Army Medical Cadet Corps, based in Saskatoon.
