= Pierre Tremblay =

Brigadier General Pierre Tremblay OBE, CD MD (c. 1905 – February 2, 1987) was the 19th Canadian Surgeon General. He was appointed as an officer of the Order of the British Empire in 1946.
