= Stanley Gerald Umphrey Shier =

18th Canadian Surgeon General (1903–1968)

Brigadier-General S.G.U. Shier OBE, CD, MD (29 September 1903 – 9 August 1968) was the 18th Canadian Surgeon General.

Born in Pefferlaw, Ontario, Stanley G.U., was educated at the University of Toronto, where he graduated with a Medical Degree in 1930.

In 1932, Shier joined the Royal Canadian Army Medical Corps, and was stationed at London, Kingston, Halifax and Ottawa. In 1941, he was sent overseas where he served as the Deputy Assistant Director, Medical Services, 2nd Canadian Division.

Shier was appointed “Lieutenant-Colonel in command of the 23rd Field Ambulance in 1942, and Assistant Director, Army Troops in 1944.” He also served as Assistant Director, Medical Services (Army), 2nd Canadian Division in France, Holland and Germany. He was made an Officer of the Order of the British Empire in 1945 for his superior service.

After the war, Shier was appointed Deputy General Medical Services (Army). In 1957, he was appointed Command Medical Officer, Québec Command, Montreal and held the position until 1951 . Shier was next posted to Army Headquarters in Oakville, Ontario from 1951 to 1956. Following these command roles Shier was appointed Director General Medical Services (Army), in 1956, where he remained until his retirement in 1958.

After retiring, Dr. Shier worked with the Ontario Department of Health, where he remained until 1966.

Brigadier-General Shier died 9 August 1968 at the age of 64.
