= James Whiteside Bridges =

Canadian general

Colonel James Whiteside Bridges CBE, (15 July 1863 – 26 February 1930) was the seventh Canadian Surgeon General.

== First World War ==
A permanent force officer, prior to the First World War, Lt.-Col. Bridges had been responsible for military medical services in the Montreal area since 1910. On the outbreak of war he was immediately tasked for overseas service as Officer Commanding No. 2 General Hospital. His unit accompanied the 1st Canadian Division to France in February 1915, and Bridges was promoted colonel soon thereafter. After a full year in France, he returned to England, where he was briefly posted as Senior Medical Officer for the Billeting Area. He was then made Assistant Director of Medical Services with the duty of organizing medical support for the newly formed 3rd Canadian Division.

Following a six-week leave to Canada, Bridges was appointed Inspector of Canadian Hospitals in England from July to October 1916. He then embarked on work to help the Director Medical Services expand and perfect the complex Canadian hospitalization system, which by necessity was intertwined with that of the Imperial service. In pursuit of this goal, Col. Bridges served successively over the next two years as Assistant Director of Medical Services for the Brighton, Witley, Shorncliffe and Bramshott areas.

== Later career ==
Following his return to Canada in 1919, he was made a Commander of the Order of the British Empire for his service during the war. Bridges also "resumed his duties as [Assistant Director of Medical Services]" (Army) in Montréal, Québec.

Bridges succeeded Maj.-Gen. G.L. Foster as Director General Medical Services in 1921 and retired to his home in Fredericton, N.B. in 1925. His tenure as D.G.M.S. was principally concerned with the complex re-organization and difficult reconstitution of the post-war Army Medical Corps.
