= Sick bay =

Medical room

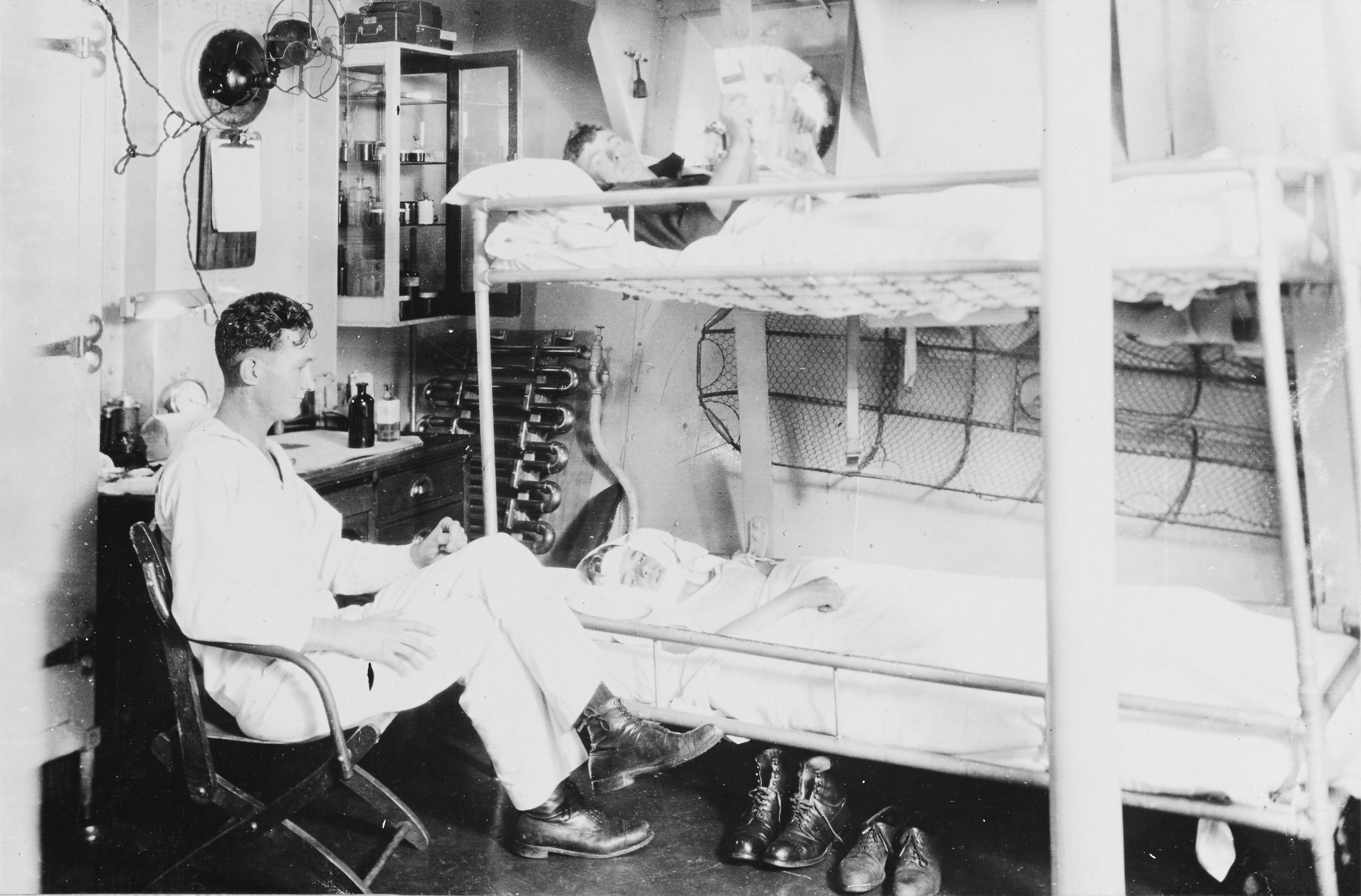
Sick bay aboard USS Prometheus, circa 1919–1920

The Sick Bay aboard HMS Pursuer (D73)

A sick bay is a compartment in a ship, or a section of another organisation, such as a school or college, used for medical purposes.

The sick bay contains the ship's medicine chest, which may be divided into separate cabinets, such as a refrigerator for medicines requiring cold storage and a locked cabinet for controlled substances such as morphine. The sick bay and the medicine chest should be kept locked, with the keys only being available to the medical officer and the ship's master.

The term is also applied ashore by the United States Navy and Marine Corps to treatment clinics on naval stations and Marine bases.

== Fiction ==
Sick bays (sometimes referred to as med bays) appear in popular science fiction franchises, such as Battlestar Galactica and Star Trek, as the medical facility on board a starship. They often feature facilities for suspended animation.

== See also ==
- First aid room
