= Walter John Elliot =

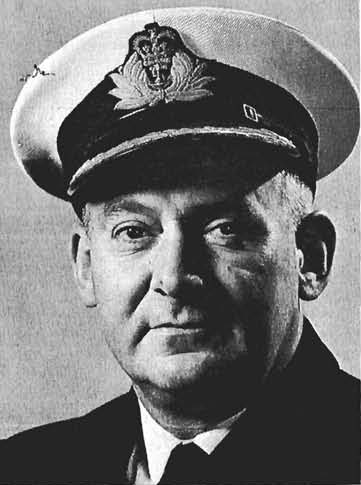
- Walter John Elliot
- Born: January 12, 1914; Harrison Hot Springs, British Columbia
- Died: November 30, 1979 (aged 65)
- Military career
- Allegiance: Canada
- Branch: Royal Canadian Navy
- Service years: 1940–1968
- Rank: Surgeon Rear-Admiral
- Commands: Surgeon General of Canada
- Conflicts: World War II

Surgeon Rear-Admiral Walter John Elliot OStJ CD QHS, MD, CM (12 January 1914 – 30 November 1979) was the 22nd Canadian Surgeon General.

Born in Harrison Hot Springs, British Columbia, Elliot was educated at Queen's University where he graduated with a medical degree in 1937. He completed post-graduate training at The Hospital for Sick Children in Toronto, from 1943 to 1944.

Elliot joined the Royal Navy Volunteer Reserve in 1940 as a medical officer, where he served on escort ships in the North Atlantic. In June 1942 he transferred to the Royal Canadian Navy Volunteer Reserve and served ashore at the hospital at HMCS Naden in Esquimalt, British Columbia.

He joined the regular force in 1946 and throughout his subsequent career as a naval medical officer served aboard HMCS Stadacona in 1954, HMCS Magnificent in 1956, and HMCS Bonaventure in 1957. He was promoted to Commodore in 1961 and appointed Deputy Surgeon General (Professional), and Surgeon General in 1964.

Elliot died 30 November 1979 at the age of 65.

== Awards and decorations ==
Allan's personal awards and decorations include the following:

Ribbon	Description	
	Canadian Forces' Decoration (CD)	with one Clasp for 22 years of services
	Order of Saint John (OStJ)	

Allan was given the title of Queen's Honorary Surgeon by the Medical Household.
