= Wendy Arlene Clay =

Canadian surgeon general

Major-General W. A. Clay CMM, OStJ, CD, QHP, MD, MHSc (born 27 September 1942) was the 33rd Canadian Surgeon General.

== Early life and education ==
Wendy Arlene Clay was born in Fort St. John, British Columbia, 27 September 1942.

She was educated at the University of British Columbia, where she received her medical degree in 1967. She also obtained a Master of Health Science Degree in 1980. In 1981, she was granted a certificate in Community Medicine by the Royal College of Physicians and Surgeons of Canada. In 1995, Clay also "received an honorary Doctor of Science degree from the University of British Columbia."

== Career ==
Clay joined the military in 1965, "as a medical student, under the Medical Officer Training Program (MOTP)." In 1967, she was posted to Canadian Forces Base (CFB) Trenton, Ontario as a general duty medical officer. While there, Clay became the first woman to receive training as a CF Flight Surgeon.

In 1970, she was promoted to major, and the following year, was posted as base surgeon to Canadian Forces Base (CFB) Moose Jaw, Saskatchewan. There Clay underwent basic pilot training in 1972.

Clay was next posted in 1973 to Training Command (subsequently Air Command) Headquarters (HQ) as staff officer, Aviation Medicine in Winnipeg, Manitoba. During this period, she took a six-month study break to complete the advanced aviation medical course with the Royal Air Force (RAF) in Farnborough, England. In 1974, she became the first woman in the Canadian Air Force (CAF) to receive her wings.

In 1977, Clay was promoted to lieutenant-colonel and joined the staff of the Canadian Forces Institute of Environmental Medicine in Toronto as the director of Medical Assessment and Training Division. During this posting, Clay completed a six-month tour of duty with the Canadian United Nations contingent to the Middle East in Egypt.

She was promoted to colonel, and was appointed to the surgeon general's staff, in Ottawa, as director of preventive medicine from 1982 to 1986, and subsequently posted to Air Command Headquarters in Winnipeg, Manitoba, as command surgeon.

In 1989, Clay was promoted to brigadier-general," and returned to Ottawa as commandant of the National Defence Medical Centre (NDMC). She held that appointment until 1992 when she was appointed deputy surgeon general.

In 1994, Clay was promoted to major-general and was appointed surgeon general, the first woman [in the CAF] to hold that rank and appointment. She remained in the position until her retirement in 1998. It was during Maj.-Gen. Clay's period in office that the medical and dental branches of the Canadian Forces were united to form a single administrative body, the Canadian Forces Health Services. During the period of amalgamation from 1995 to 1997, Clay's staff authorities were elevated from those of director of General Medical Services to chief of Health Services.

After retiring, she moved to Victoria, British Columbia, where she served on several boards and committees, including the board of the Victoria Hospice Society, chair of the St. John's Ambulance branch executive committee, chair of the board of governors of the Canadian Corps of Commissionaires, the board of directors for the Broadmead Care, and the Victoria Symphony.
