= Lord Clarendon (ship) =

Canadian sailing ship

History

Canada
- Name: Lord Clarendon
- Port of registry: Sydney, Nova Scotia; Official No. 9017946
- Builder: William Nesbitt, North Sydney, Nova Scotia
- Launched: 1851
- Maiden voyage: North Sydney to Liverpool, November 13, 1851
- Fate: Wrecked November 26, 1851

General characteristics
- Tonnage: 1073 Gross Tons
- Length: 155.8 ft.
- Beam: 32.6 ft.
- Depth: 23.4 ft.
- Decks: 2
- Propulsion: Sail
- Sail plan: Full-rigged ship
- Crew: 19

Lord Clarendon was the largest wooden ship ever built in Cape Breton Island, Nova Scotia. The ship was named in honour of the British statesman, George Villiers, the 4th Earl of Clarendon. The ship was built to order at North Sydney by William Nesbitt for clients in Great Britain. She was completed in November 1851 and left North Sydney for Liverpool, England with a cargo of timber on November 13, under the command of Samuel Hannan. Her rudder was damaged by a severe storm hours after leaving port and the ship turned back for North Sydney for repairs. However, Lord Clarendon ran aground at Low Point at the entrance to Sydney Harbour. The ship was not badly damaged and plans were made to refloat her as soon as the weather calmed. However, a violent gale on November 26 carried away the foremast and mainmast, damaging the ship beyond repair. The crew were rescued the next day. The ship soon broke apart but some cargo and fittings were salvaged.
