= Wilbur R. Franks =

Canadian scientist, inventor of the anti-gravity suit ("G-suit"), and cancer researcher

Wilbur Franks

Wilbur Rounding Franks, OBE (4 March 1901 – 4 January 1986) was a Canadian scientist, notable as the inventor of the anti-gravity suit or G-suit, and for his work in cancer research.

== Career ==
Franks was born in Weston, Ontario, and attended Victoria College and the Faculty of Medicine at the University of Toronto. As a cancer researcher at the Banting and Best Medical Research Institute at the University of Toronto, Franks developed an idea that resulted in the world's first anti-gravity suit or G-suit. Franks had noted that his test tubes often broke when subjected to severe centrifugal force. He had solved the problem by first inserting them into larger and stronger liquid-filled bottles.

In 1940, the anti-gravity suit was developed under the name Franks Flying Suit by Wilbur R. Franks and his colleagues at the Banting and Best Medical Research Institute at the University of Toronto. The suit was made with rubber and water-filled pads. It counteracted the effects of high G-forces on aircraft pilots, which otherwise would cause them to black out. These suits were used during World War II, and all G-Suits worn by air force pilots as well as astronauts and cosmonauts around the world are based on his original designs. When testing his first prototype, Franks stated:

"The suit had been cut to fit me perfectly, standing up. . . . In the airplane I was sitting down, and when the pressure hit I thought it was going to cut me in two. The idea became practical only when we realized that great areas of the body could be left outside the fluid system."

In 1941 fellow Canadian scientist, Dr. Sir Frederick Banting, co-discoverer of insulin, died in a plane crash near Musgrave Harbour, Newfoundland, while on his way to England to assist Franks in the testing of the suit.

== Recognition and awards ==
Wilbur Franks was appointed an Officer of the Order of the British Empire for his work in early 1944 for giving "the Allied forces a tremendous tactical advantage" and "saving the lives of thousands of Allied fighter pilots." In 1983, Franks was inducted into Canada's Aviation Hall of Fame. Franks work was also noticed in the United States where he was awarded the Legion of Merit, the Aerospace Medical Association's Theodore C. Lyster Award and Eric Liljencrantz Award.

== Legacy ==
There is a Wilbur R. Franks Award that is given by the Canadian Society of Aviation Medicine for contributions to aviation medicine. The Wilbur Rounding Franks Building at 17 Wing Winnipeg is the home of the Canadian Forces School of Survival and Aeromedical Training (CFSSAT).
