= Jacob Leslie Potter =

Colonel Jacob Leslie Potter BStJ (16 April 1877 – 1958) was the 11th Canadian Surgeon General.

Potter joined the Non-Permanent Army Militia Medical Corps in 1907 as a lieutenant and the following year, transferred into the permanent force in the rank of captain.

During World War I, by this time holding the rank of major, he remained at Canadian Headquarters and held the post of Acting Director General Medical Services from 1915 to 1917 with the temporary rank of lieutenant-colonel. He later served as Deputy DGMS 1917-18 under Maj.-Gen. John Taylor Fotheringham and was ultimately taken on strength of the CEF in the rank of colonel in 1918, and assumed command of No. 11 Stationary Hospital, which was a newly assembled unit from Vancouver, British Columbia. That same year, the unit was sent overseas to Vladivostok, Russia as commanding officer of 11 Canadian Stationary Hospital, part of the Canadian Siberian Expeditionary Force (CSEF). Colonel Potter’s wife, Nursing Matron Grace Elrida Potter was also sent at the same time to Vladivostok as part of the Siberian Expedition; in fact, she was the sole woman in the contingent, being the Red Cross representative with the force.

Shortly after arriving in Vladivostok, Potter was appointed to the staff of the Commander of the CSEF as Assistant Director of Medical Services, remaining until the force returned to Canada in the late spring of 1919.

He was appointed Director General Medical Services in 1936.
