= Hugh McKay (footballer) =

Australian rules footballer

Personal information
- Full name: Hugh James McKay
- Born: 5 November 1883; Karramomus, Victoria
- Died: 28 August 1971 (aged 87); Birregurra, Victoria

Playing career^{1}
Years	Club	Games (Goals)
1907–08	Geelong	9 (1)
- ^{1} Playing statistics correct to the end of 1908.

Hugh James McKay (5 November 1883 – 28 August 1971) was an Australian rules footballer who played with Geelong in the Victorian Football League (VFL).
