= Canadian Forces Health Services Group =

- Groupe de Services de santé des Forces canadiennes
- Unit badge
- Country: Canada
- Branch: Unified (navy, army and air force) organization
- Role: Military medicine
- Part of: Canadian Armed Forces
- Garrison/HQ: Ottawa
- Motto: Sanitas (Latin for 'Health')

Commanders
- Commander: Brigadier-General Marilynn Chenette, CD
- Surgeon General: Major-General Scott Malcolm, MSC, CD, MD
- Group Chief Warrant Officer: Chief Warrant Officer Martin Bedard, CD

The Canadian Forces Health Services Group (CF H Svcs Gp) is a formation of the Canadian Forces within Military Personnel Command. It includes personnel from both the Royal Canadian Medical Service and the Royal Canadian Dental Corps, fulfills all military health system functions from education and clinical services to research and public health, and is composed of health professionals from over 40 occupations and specialties in over 120 units and detachments across Canada and abroad.

== Structure ==
In May 2017 the group's national headquarters (CF H Svcs Gp HQ) moved from the National Defence Medical Centre to the NDHQ Carling Campus, in Ottawa, Ontario.

It has two subordinate regional headquarters. Each health services group is made up of CF health services centres and field ambulances (Regular and Reserve).

- 1 Health Services Group, with its headquarters in Edmonton, Alberta, is responsible for all health services units from Thunder Bay, Ontario, to the west coast. As of August 2022, the 1 Health Services Group command team includes Colonel Jean-Pierre Buisson, as the Formation Commander and CWO Frédérick Morissette, as the Formation Group Chief Warrant Officer. It includes 1 Field Ambulance, 11 (Victoria) Field Ambulance, 12 (Vancouver) Field Ambulance, 15 (Edmonton) Field Ambulance, 16 (Regina) Field Ambulance, 17 (Winnipeg) Field Ambulance and 18 (Thunder Bay) Field Ambulance.
- 4 Health Services Group with its headquarters in Montreal, Quebec, is responsible for all health services units in the remainder of Ontario to the east coast. As of May 2024, 4 Health Services Group is commanded by Colonel Franz Kirk and is responsible for 2 Field Ambulance, co-located with 2 Canadian Mechanized Brigade Group at CFB Petawawa and the 5 Field Ambulance, co-located with 5 Canadian Mechanized Brigade Group in CFB Valcartier. 4 Health Services Group also includes 23 Field Ambulance, Hamilton, London, Windsor; 25 Field Ambulance, Toronto; 28 Field Ambulance, Ottawa; 33 Field Ambulance, Halifax, Sydney, Charlottetown; 35 Field Ambulance, St. John's, Saint John; 51 Field Ambulance, Montreal; 52 Field Ambulance, Sherbrooke; and 55 Field Ambulance, Quebec City, all of which are reserve units.

The national headquarters is composed of several functional directorates reporting to the commander:

- Deputy Commander:
  - Director Health Services Operations
  - Director Health Services Reserves
  - Director Health Services Personnel
  - Comptroller
  - A number of national elements report directly to the deputy commander and not to either of the regional headquarters including:
    - Canadian Forces Health Services Training Centre
    - Canadian Forces Environmental Medicine Establishment
    - Canadian Forces Health Services Centre Ottawa
    - Central Medical Equipment Depot
    - 1 Canadian Field Hospital including Detachment Ottawa (formerly known as the Canadian Forces Health Services Primary Reserve List)
    - 1 Dental Unit

Or to the surgeon general:

- Deputy Surgeon General
  - Director Medical Policy
  - Director Force Health Protection
  - Director Mental Health
  - Each environmental command chief has a senior medical advisor: Royal Canadian Navy Surgeon, Canadian Army Surgeon, and Royal Canadian Air Force Surgeon. There is also a Canadian Special Forces Command Surgeon.
- Deputy Director General Health Services
  - Deputy Chief of Staff/Headquarters Commanding Officer
  - Director Corporate Services
  - Director Health Services Strategy
  - Director Health Services Capability Development
- Chief Dental Officer/Director Dental Services
- Director Quality and Performance
- Director Clinical Strategy and Innovation

Health Services Secretariat includes public affairs, legal advisor, policy and records, and privacy that advise both the commander and surgeon-general.

== Training ==
Canadian Forces Health Services Training Centre (CFHSTC)

Home station at CFB Borden, Ontario

=== School of Operational Medicine (SOM) ===
The School of Operational Medicine (SOM) in Toronto, Ontario forms a part of the Canadian Forces Environmental Medicine Establishment. In turn the Canadian Forces Environmental Medicine Establishment is the military component of the Defence Research and Development Canada. The School of Operational Medicine (SOM) conducts all Flight Surgeon training. In addition, it offers courses at various levels in Diving Medicine, to Physicians, Medical technicians and Physician Assistants.

=== Canadian Forces School of Survival and Aeromedical Training ===
The Canadian Forces School of Survival and Aeromedical Training (CFSSAT) in Winnipeg, Manitoba, provides initial and continuation training for all CF aircrew. The training covers diverse topics including life support equipment and human factors, search and evasion as well as disorientation and night vision.
