= Probang =

Tool used by surgeons and veterinarians to remove obstructions from the oesophagus

A probang is a surgical tool 30 to 40 cm long consisting of a flexible rod with a sponge in the end used to remove foreign bodies or obstructions from the oesophagus. Its invention is credited to Walter Rumsey (1584–1660), who invented it in the 17th century. Rumsey's probang was originally made using a long, slender rod of whalebone. A piece of sponge was attached to one end and the tool which was used to push foreign bodies (lodged in the oesophagus) into the stomach.

In addition to their use in human surgery, probangs are also used by veterinarians on cattle, to reach obstructions and either force them along the oesophagus by (gently and carefully) using the probang as a ram or, by using a hollow probang into which a rod with a corkscrew is attached, extract objects such as pieces of potato or turnip too long for the paunch.

== See also ==
- Instruments used in general surgery
