= Operation Scalpel =

Operation SCALPEL was the Canadian Forces military operation contribution of a field hospital during the Gulf War.
