= Robert W. Fassold =

R.W. Fassold
- Born: June 10, 1933; London, Ontario
- Died: July 2, 2018 (aged 85); Ottawa, Ontario
- Education: University of Western Ontario (B.S., M.D.)

R.W. Fassold CStJ, CD, QHP, MD (10 June 1933 – 2 July 2018) was the 29th Canadian Surgeon General. Born in London, Ontario, Robert W., was educated at "the University of Western Ontario, where he earned" a bachelor's degree in Science in 1955, and a medical degree in 1968, "under the Military Medical Training Plan (MMTP)." He was the first to graduate under the MMTP. He also completed graduate studies in 1971 at the University of Toronto, in Public Health, and in 1972 "at the United States Air Force School of Aerospace Medicine, Brooks Air Force Based in San Antonio, Texas."

Prior to enrolling in medical school, Fassold joined the RCAF (Auxiliary) in 1956. As a pilot officer, Fassold, "who held a short-service commission, was sponsored for an 18-month pilot training program by 420 (Aux) Squadron, London Ontario. This squadron was disbanded just as [he had completed] his basic flying training on the Harvard aircraft at #2 Flying Training School at Moose Jaw, Saskatchewan."

In 1957, "Flying Officer Fassold transferred to the Regular Force when he received his wings." He "served with 2 Air Observer School at RCAF Station Winnipeg, Manitoba and then with 412 (VIP) Transport Squadron at RCAF Station Uplands Ontario."

Newly promoted to major, Fassold "was appointed Base Surgeon at Canadian Forces Base [RCAF] Trenton, Ontario, in 1969 where he served as Flight Surgeon until 1971."

After returning to Canada in 1973, Fassold was assigned to the surgeon general's staff, in the Directorate of Preventive Medicine in Ottawa, Ontario. In 1974, he was promoted to lieutenant-colonel, and "after one year as section head…[he] was appointed Acting Director of Preventive Medicine." The following year he "joined the staff of the newly formed Air Command Headquarters in Winnipeg …[as] Staff Officer Medical Operations."

In 1977, Fassold was promoted to colonel and appointed "Commanding Officer of the Canadian Forces Environmental Medicine Establishment and Deputy Chief (later acting Chief) of the Defence and Civil Institute of Environmental Medicine in Toronto", Ontario.

Fassold was promoted to brigadier-general and appointed deputy surgeon general in 1980. In 1985, he was promoted to major-general and appointed Surgeon General. During that appointment he also served as president of the Aerospace Medical Association from 1986 to 1987, a position held almost exclusively by American aerospace specialists.

He remained in the position of surgeon general until 1988, at which time he retired from the Canadian Forces, and "formed a consultancy in Aerospace and Occupational Medicine with his major clients being the Canadian Space Agency and Canada Post Corporation." He also served as Occupational Medicine Consultant on Transport Canada's Aviation Medical Review Board (AMRB) and as Chair of the Canadian Space Agency's Life Sciences Advisory Committee.

In 1995, "he purchased an ex-RCAF de Havilland DHC-1 Chipmunk, a two-seat training aircraft, which he operated commercially, providing pilot training and passenger rides, including those at Canada’s National Aviation Museum in Ottawa", Ontario.
