= Surgeon General (Canada) =

Professional head of the Canadian military health jurisdiction

- Incumbent; Major-General Scott Malcolm since December 13, 2023
- Canadian Forces Health Services Group
- Type: Surgeon general
- Reports to: Canadian Joint Forces Command
- First holder: Darby Bergin

Surgeon General (French: médecin-général) is the title of the professional head of the Canadian military health jurisdiction, the adviser to the Minister of National Defence and the Chief of the Defence Staff on all matters related to health, and the head of the Royal Canadian Medical Service. The Surgeon General may also be appointed as the commander of the Canadian Forces Health Services Group, which fulfils all military health system functions from education and clinical services to research and public health. It consists of the Royal Canadian Medical Service, the Royal Canadian Dental Corps, personnel from other branches of the armed forces, and civilians, with health professionals from over 45 occupations and specialties in over 125 units and detachments across Canada and abroad. When appointed as Director General Health Services, the Surgeon General is also the senior health services staff officer in the Department of National Defence. The Surgeon General is normally appointed to the Medical Household as Honorary Physician (KHP) or Honorary Surgeon (KHS) to His Majesty the King.

== History ==
The first head of the Canadian military medical service was Colonel Darby Bergin, a physician and surgeon who was also Member of Parliament for Cornwall, president of the College of Physicians and Surgeons of Ontario, founder of the 1st Volunteer Militia Rifle Company of Cornwall, and first commanding officer of the 59th Stormont and Glengarry Battalion of Infantry (now the Stormont, Dundas and Glengarry Highlanders). Selected by the Minister of Militia and Defence, the Honourable Sir Adolphe Caron, to organize the North-West Field Force medical services during the North-West Rebellion of 1885, Colonel Bergin's own proposed appointment as Director General Medical Services, was overruled by the Minister in favour of Surgeon General.

Sir Eugène Fiset was the first Surgeon General after the establishment of the Canadian Army Medical Corps in 1904 (renamed the Royal Canadian Army Medical Corps in 1919), the creation of which was the second step in bringing all military health personnel under unified administration. Appointed Director General Medical Services as a colonel in 1903, he was subsequently appointed Deputy Minister of Militia and Defence in 1906 and promoted to Surgeon General in 1914. After retirement in 1923, he was elected Member of Parliament for Rimouski and appointed Lieutenant-Governor of Quebec in 1939.

Major-General GB Chisholm was Surgeon General during the Second World War when the Canadian military health services reached their largest size in history. He was appointed the first federal Deputy Minister of Health in late 1944 and was elected as the first director-general of the World Health Organization in 1948.

Major-General KA Hunter was the first modern Surgeon General following the 1959 integration of the Royal Canadian Army Medical Corps with the sister medical services of the Royal Canadian Navy and Royal Canadian Air Force to form a joint military medical professional-technical organization, the Canadian Forces Medical Service (CFMS). The CFMS was renamed the Royal Canadian Medical Service in 2013.

== List of Surgeons General (or equivalent) ==
Surgeon General of the Militia Medical Services

- Lieutenant-Colonel (later Colonel) Darby Bergin April 1885

'Director General of the Medical Staff / Director General Medical Services' (Canadian Militia)

- Colonel JLH Neilson February 1898

Director General of Medical Services (Canadian Militia/Army)

- Colonel Sir MJC Eugène Fiset July 1903, promoted to Surgeon General (Major-General) December 1914 while Deputy Minister of Militia
- Colonel GC Jones December 1906, promoted to Surgeon General (Major-General) September 1915 (Note 1)
- Major-General JT Fotheringham November 1917 (Note 1)
- Major-General GL Foster December 1920
- Colonel JW Bridges June 1921
- Colonel HM Jacques April 1925
- Colonel JT Clarke June 1930
- Colonel AE Snell September 1933
- Colonel JL Potter July 1936
- Brigadier RM Gorssline November 1939
- Major-General GB Chisholm September 1942 (Note 1)
- Major-General CP Fenwick January 1945 (Note 1)
- Brigadier CS Thompson March 1946 (Note 1)
- Brigadier WL Coke October 1947 (Note 1)
- Brigadier KA Hunter November 1952 (Note 1)
- Brigadier SGU Shier March 1956 (Note 1)
- Brigadier P Tremblay October 1958 (Note 1)

Note 1: The Canadian Army established separate Directors or Directors General Medical Services for their overseas forces in 1914 to 1920 and 1940 to 1946. The medical services of the Royal Canadian Navy and Royal Canadian Air Force were led by separate Directors General from 1940 to 1959. Prior to 1940, the Royal Canadian Navy's medical service was too small to have a full-time medical directorate and from 1911 until 1924 the senior naval surgeon in Halifax acted as Principal Medical Officer, ensuring Royal Navy medical regulations were correctly applied to the RCN..

Surgeon General

- Major-General KA Hunter January 1959
- Surgeon Rear-Admiral TB McLean January 1960
- Surgeon Rear-Admiral WJ Elliot September 1964
- Major-General DGM Nelson July 1968
- Major-General JWB Barr July 1970
- Rear-Admiral RH Roberts September 1973
- Major-General WG Leach April 1976
- Major-General VA McPherson August 1980
- Major-General R Dupuis July 1982
- Major-General RW Fassold September 1985
- Rear-Admiral CJ Knight January 1988
- Major-General JJ Benoit August 1990
- Major-General P Morisset August 1992
- Major-General WA Clay October 1994
- Brigadier-General C Auger January 2000 (Note 2)
- Brigadier-General HF Jaeger June 2004
- Commodore HW Jung July 2009
- Brigadier-General JJ-RS Bernier July 10, 2012. On transfer to the Primary Reserve component he was promoted Major-General and served as the chair of the Chiefs of Medical Services (COMEDS) of NATO 2015–2018
- Brigadier-General HC MacKay June 2015
- Brigadier-General AMT Downes 2017. Promoted Major-General in 2019.
- Major-General (Acting While So Employed) Marc Bilodeau July 2020. (Note 3). Promoted substantive Major-General 2022.
- Major-General Scott Malcolm, December 13, 2023

Note 2: Command and Director General responsibilities were held separately by Major-General MJL Mathieu (Jan 2000–Apr 2005) and Commodore MF Kavanagh (Apr 2005–Jul 2007)

Note 3: Command and Director General responsibilities held by Rear-Admiral Rebecca Patterson (Jul 2020-2021) and Brigadier-General Scott F. Malcolm holds command responsibilities from Jul 2021
