= Medicine chest =

Place to store medicine, especially aboard a ship

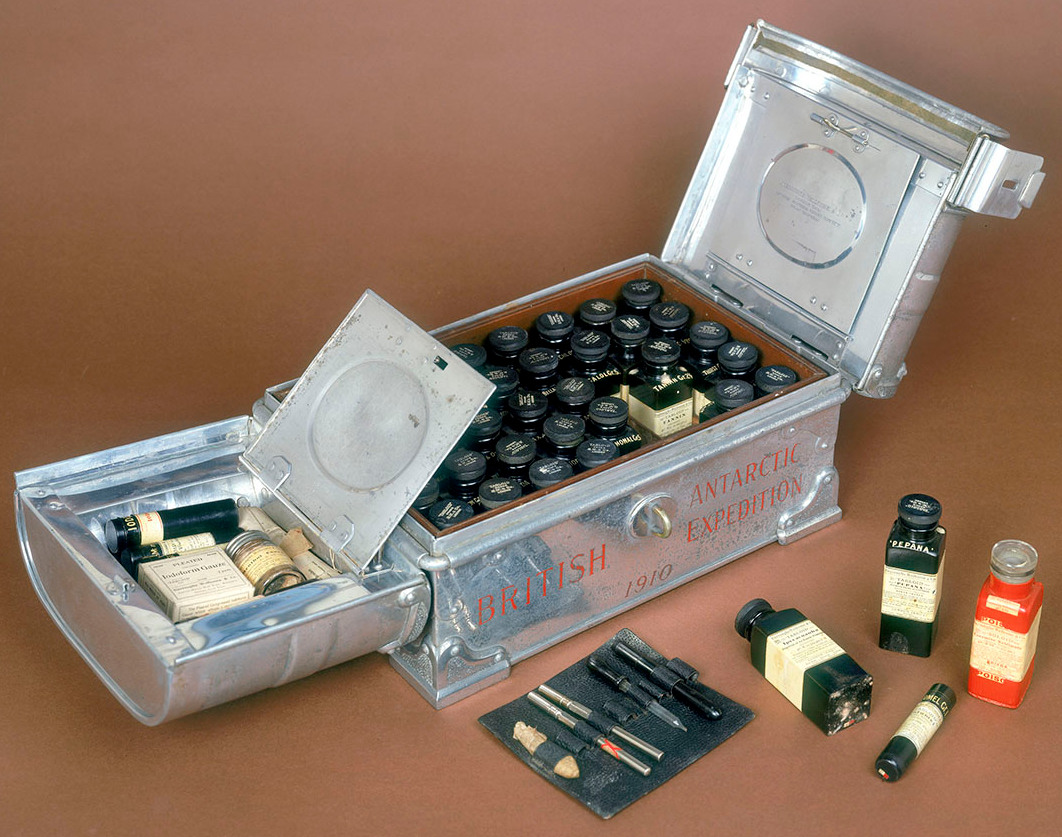
Made by Burroughs Wellcome & Co, this chest was used by Robert Falcon Scott on the first part of Terra Nova Expedition. Such cases, made of lightweight metal, airtight and waterproof, were used by various explorers from the 1880s onwards, including Henry Morton Stanley, Roald Amundsen and Fridtjof Nansen.

A medicine chest is a container or cabinet for storing medicine. All ships governed by the regulations of the International Maritime Organization must have medical supplies and suitable storage for them such as refrigeration and locks.

In Canada medicine chest has a related, symbolic meaning. Under the terms of Treaty 6 between the Canadian government and several bands of First Nations people ("Indians"), the government was required to supply each Indian reserve with a medicine chest. That has been interpreted as an ongoing responsibility for the government to provide healthcare to First Nations people.

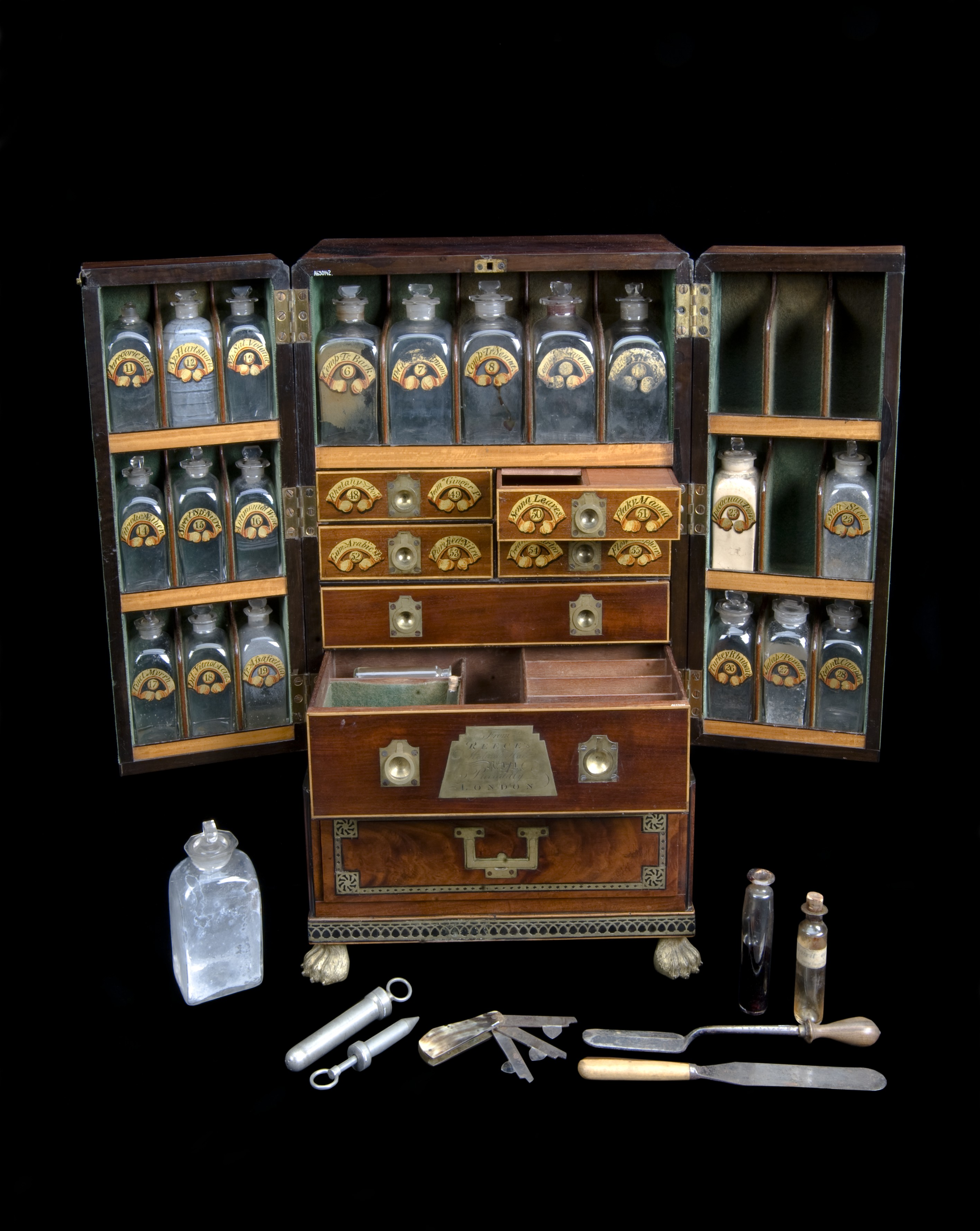
A medicine chest, winged front, from Reece's Medical Hall, Piccadilly, with 30 painted glass bottles and 4 drawers, 5 confection glasses, 1 probang, 3 boxes, 1 plaster spreader, 1 seal, 1 spatula, 1 bowl, 1 pill tile, 1 fleam, 1 lancet, 2 syringes, 4 visiting cards, 1 receipt and engraved plate, circa 1805
