= HMCS Provider =

HMCS Provider is a name used by several ships of the Royal Canadian Navy -

- HMCS Provider (1942), a Fairmile-support depot ship
- HMCS Provider (AOR 508), an auxiliary vessel
