= Timothy Blair McLean =

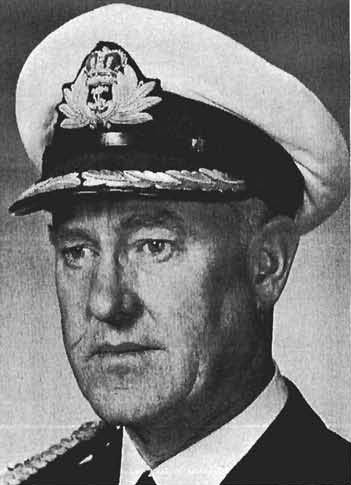
- Timothy Blair McLean
- Born: September 29, 1910; Fairydell, Alberta
- Died: June 28, 1982 (aged 71)
- Military career
- Allegiance: Canada
- Branch: Royal Canadian Navy
- Service years: 1929–1964
- Rank: Surgeon Rear-Admiral
- Commands: Surgeon General of Canada 1960-1964; Principal Medical Officer of the [Royal Canadian Navy] RCN Hospital at Esquimalt 1947-1950; Principal Medical Officer of HMCS Naden and Command Medical Officer 1952-1958
- Conflicts: World War II
- Awards: CD, CStJ, Queen's Honorary Surgeon

Timothy Blair McLean, CD, CStJ, QHS (29 September 1910 – 28 June 1982) was the 21st Canadian Surgeon General.

Born in Fairydell, Alberta, Blair McLean was educated at the University of Alberta, where he graduated with a Medical Degree. He also completed post-graduate surgical training “at the U.S. Naval Hospital, San Diego, California” from 1950 to 1952.

McLean joined the Royal Canadian Navy Volunteer Reserve (RCNVR) in 1929 “and served continuously in the naval reserve for the next 10 years.” At the beginning of the Second World War “he was called to active service as a surgeon lieutenant.” During the first half of the war, McLean “served as medical officer in the destroyers Ottawa, Saguenay, Fraser and Margaree, surviving the sinking of the latter two.” For the remainder of the war, “he served in various medical appointments ashore and as Principal Medical Officer of HMCS Uganda (cruiser).”

He joined the regular force in 1945, was subsequently “appointed Principal Medical Officer of the [Royal Canadian Navy] RCN Hospital at Esquimalt in March 1947.” The following year, “he was appointed Command Medical Officer, Esquimalt.”

McLean returned to school for a short period of time, from 1950 to 1952. Upon completing his studies, “he returned to the west coast as Principal Medical Officer of HMCS Naden and Command Medical Officer.” He remained in the position until 1958, when he was appointed Medical Director General of the RCN. The following year Mclean was appointed Deputy Surgeon General (Professional); he succeeded to the position of Surgeon General in 1960.

Surgeon Rear-Admiral McLean died 28 June 1982 at the age of 71.
