= John Taylor Fotheringham =

Canadian Surgeon General (1860 - 1940)

- Born: 5 December 1860; Kirkton, Canada West
- Died: 19 May 1940 (aged 79)
- Occupation: Surgeon General

Major-General John Taylor Fotheringham CMG KStJ (5 December 1860 – 19 May 1940) was the 5th Canadian Surgeon General.

Born in Kirkton, Canada West, Fotheringham was educated first at St. Mary’s Collegiate, and followed by Trinity Medical College and the University of Toronto, where he graduated with a Medical Degree in 1891. He also "received the honorary degree of LLD from both the University of Toronto and Queen’s University" in 1918.

Fotheringham first joined "with ‘K’ Company, Queen’s Own Rifles in 1879. He was appointed Surgeon-Lieutenant of the 12th York Rangers in 1896. A year later he was transferred to the Queen’s Own Rifles with the same rank." He enlisted for Active Service in 1915 and "was raised to the rank of Colonel. He was appointed Assistant-Director of Medical Services for Military District No. 2, and served overseas with the Second Canadian Division." In 1917, Fotheringham was appointed Acting Director General Medical Services in Canada, and remained in the position until 1920.

In 1924, he was "gazetted Honorary Colonel of the Royal Canadian Army Medical Corps."

During his civilian career he served "on the medical faculty of Trinity Medical College and later the University of Toronto." He was also on the staff of "the Toronto General Hospital and [the] Hospital for Sick Children."

Major-General Fotheringham died 19 May 1940 at the age of 79.
