= National Defence Medical Centre =

- The Ottawa Hospital

Geography
- Location: Ottawa, Ontario, Canada
- Coordinates: 45°24′06″N 75°39′26″W

Organization
- Care system: Military
- Type: Specialist

Services
- Emergency department: No
- Beds: 4

Links
- Lists: Hospitals in Canada

The National Defence Medical Centre (NDMC) was the national and largest hospital of the Canadian Armed Forces in Ottawa, Ontario, Canada. It served the needs of the members of the military. Constructed in 1961, it was closed in the 1990s due to budget cutbacks in National Defence and Veterans' Affairs Canada. The building now houses Canadian Forces Health Services Group Headquarters, the CF Health Services Centre Ottawa, the 33 Canadian Brigade Group headquarters, and other military units.

All in-patient and surgical services for the Canadian Forces in the Ottawa region are done at the Civic Campus of The Ottawa Hospital where they have a 4-bed unit, and their own Operating Theater.

It was announced in 2003 that they will be moving to 2 floors of the new Montfort Hospital.
