= Royal Canadian Army Medical Corps =

Former administrative corps of the Royal Canadian Army

The Royal Canadian Army Medical Corps
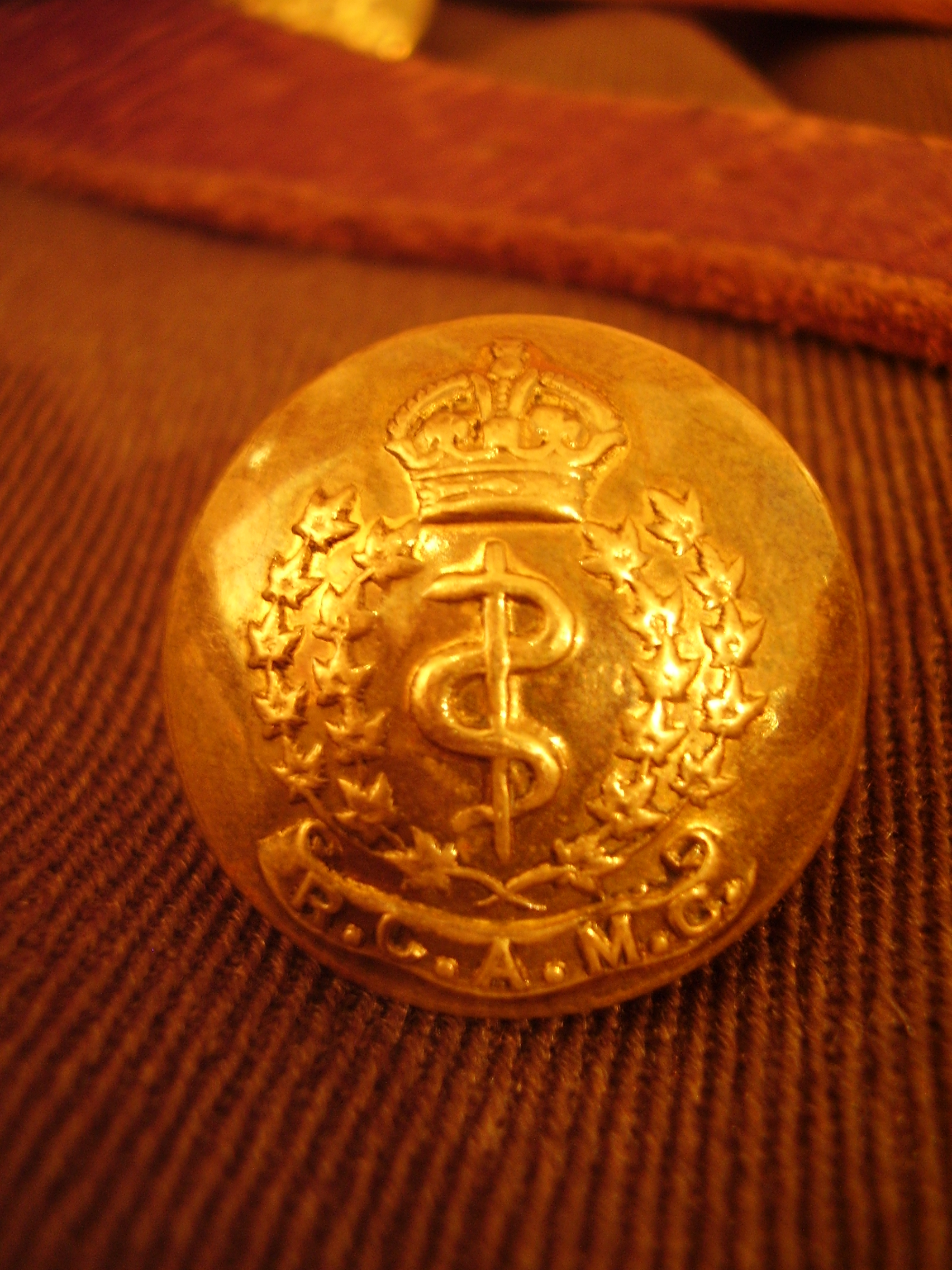
- RCAMC uniform button
- Active: 1904–1968
- Country: Canada
- Branch: Permanent Active Militia; Non-Permanent Active Militia; Canadian Army
- Type: Administrative corps
- Role: Military medicine
- Motto: In arduis fidelis (Latin for 'faithful through adversity')
- Colors: Dull cherry
- March: "The Farmer's Boy"

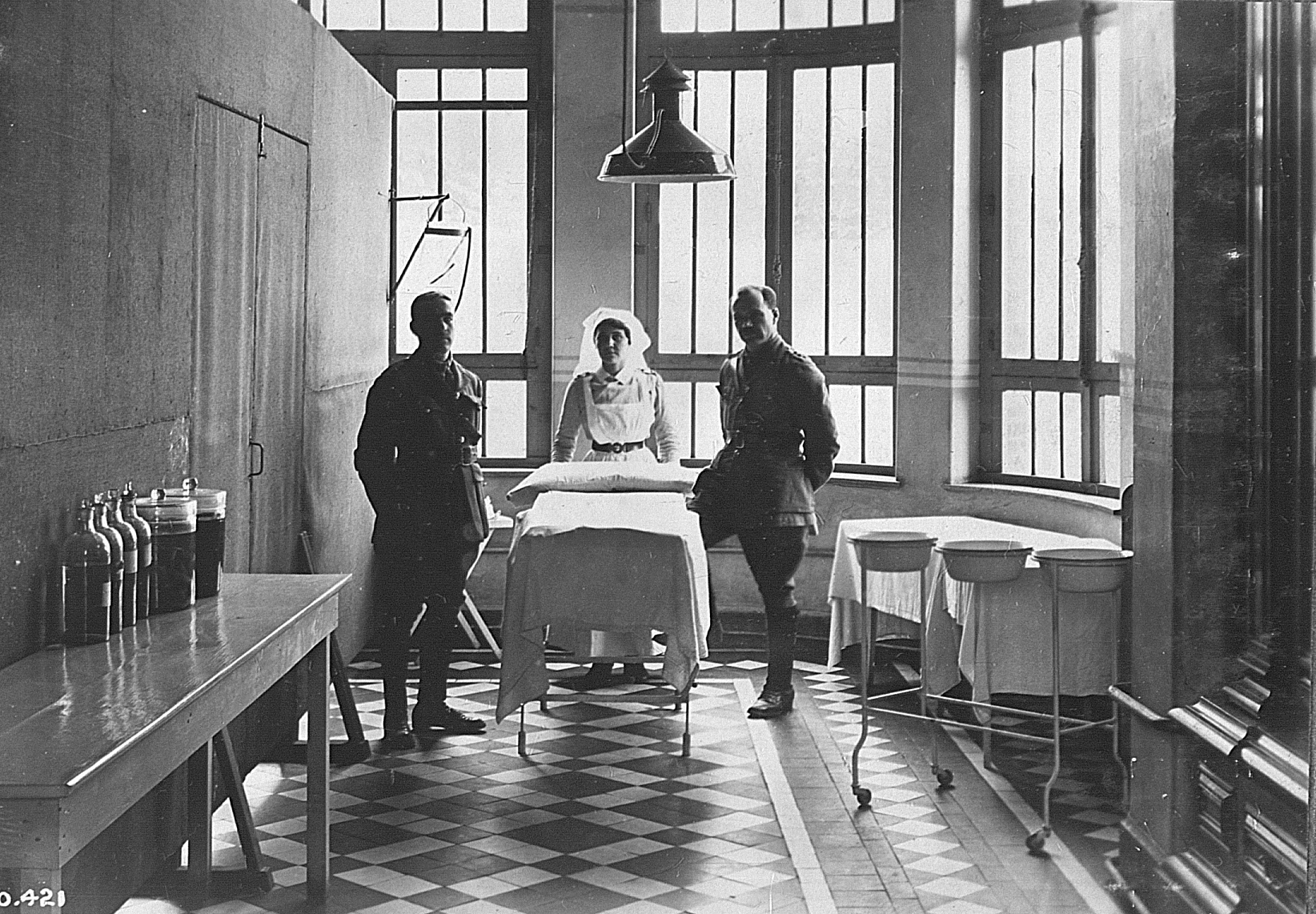
A Canadian nurse with two soldiers in WWI.

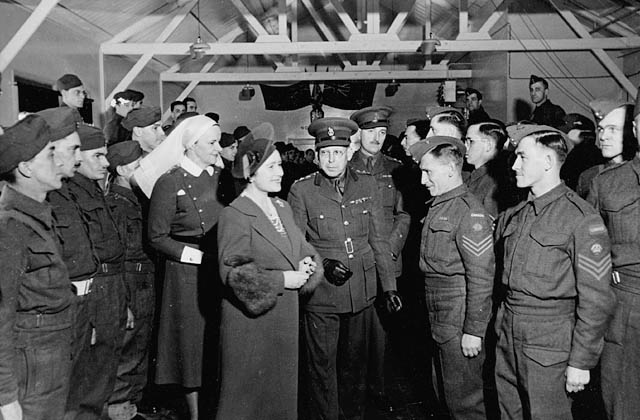
Royal visit to RCAMC, Bramshott, England, 17 March 1941

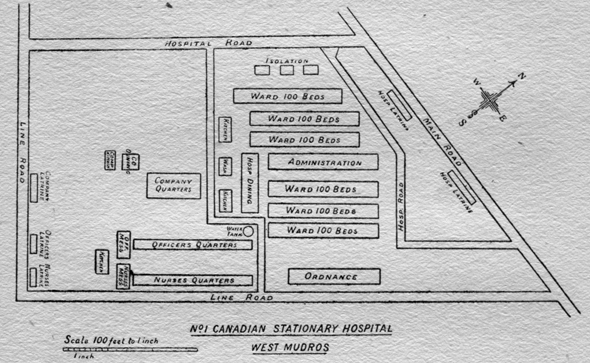
Floor Plan of No. 1 Canadian Stationary Hospital, West Mudros, World War I

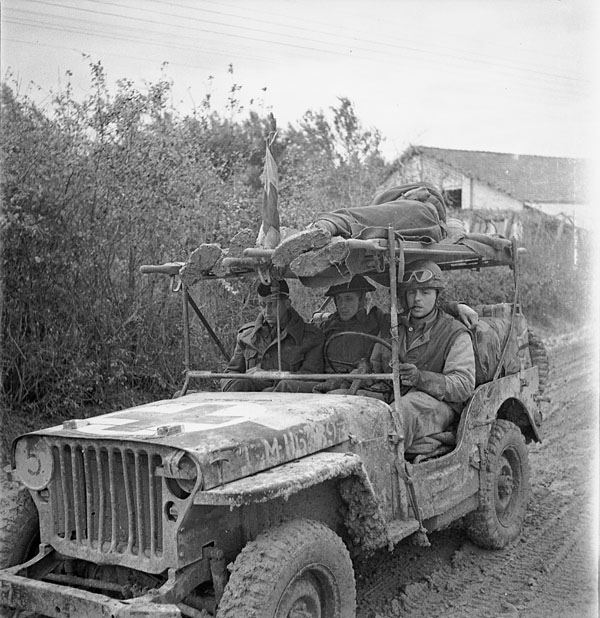
A jeep ambulance of the Royal Canadian Army Medical Corps (R.C.A.M.C.) bringing in two wounded Canadian soldiers on the Moro River front, south of San Leonardo di Ortona, Italy, December 10, 1943

The Royal Canadian Army Medical Corps (RCAMC) was an administrative corps of the Canadian Army.

== History ==
The Militia Medical Service was established in 1898. It consisted of an Army Medical Service (officers) and an Army Medical Corps (other ranks). Sir F.W. Borden was appointed Honorary Colonel of the militia's "Canadian Army Medical Corps" on 1 August 1901.

The regimental medical personnel of the Permanent Active Militia were absorbed into the corps on 2 July 1904. The regular component was titled the "Permanent Active Militia Medical Corps" (PAMC) and the militia component was titled the "Army Medical Corps" (AMC). As the origin of a permanent medical corps, this date has since been considered the "birth" of the Royal Canadian Army Medical Corps for purposes of seniority among the corps of the Canadian Army, coming after the Royal Army Service Corps, 1903. (Though in the Militia the medical corps was the first of the support branches to be formed.)

Separate titles for permanent and non-permanent components of the medical corps were discarded during the re-organization of 1 May 1909. Thereafter, both permanent (regular) and non-permanent (reserve) components using the title "Canadian Army Medical Corps" (CAMC). The regular component of the service was redesignated "The Royal Canadian Army Medical Corps" on 3 November 1919; the militia component was granted the same honour on 29 April 1936, becoming the "Royal Canadian Army Medical Corps". These two elements were re-organized for administrative purposes following the Second World War, on 22 March 1948, as "The Royal Canadian Army Medical Corps". The corps suffix "RCAMC" was added to the designation of all corps units from 1944.

The badge of the RCAMC consists of the rod of Asclepius (a serpent entwined around a staff) surrounded by a wreath of maple leaves, surmounted by the Royal Crown, with the name "Royal Canadian Army Medical Corps" on a scroll below. The earlier badge of the CAMC (1909) was identical, minus the prefix "Royal" on the scroll. The previous badge of the Army Medical Service and Army Medical Corps consisted of a Geneva cross on a silver maple leaf (1899). The badge of the Royal Army Medical Corps was briefly used by some members during the embryonic period of the service (1898).

After the Second World War, a series of coloured berets were adopted, with other arms and services wearing midnight blue berets, with a large coloured "flash" in corps colours – dull cherry for the Royal Canadian Army Medical Corps.

Queen Elizabeth the Queen Mother was appointed Colonel-in-Chief of the RCAMC in 1954, at the time of the 50th anniversary celebrations of the corps.

== Nursing officers ==
Nurses were first employed by the Canadian military during the North West Rebellion in 1885, being at that time civilian auxiliaries. Canada was one of the first nations to establish nurses as integral military personnel, first as officers of the militia (reserve) force in 1900, and in 1906 as officers of the regular force.

== Integration and unification ==
In 1959 the RCAMC joined with the medical services of the Royal Canadian Navy (RCN) and Royal Canadian Air Force (RCAF) to form the Canadian Forces Medical Service (CFMS). Medical personnel continued to wear the uniform of their respective service, but were functionally integrated under the professional direction of the newly created surgeon general of the Canadian Forces. Medical administration, personnel development and individual training were standardized within the CFMS in order to facilitate the operation of tri-service hospitals and joint medical headquarters. Fighting units continued to obtain integral medical support from their own uniformed personnel. Hospitals, medical headquarters, training schools and equipment depots and research facilities were staffed by CFMS members of all three services, resulting in a larger, more capable and more flexible organization (and more economical).

When the RCN, Canadian Army and RCAF were merged in 1968 to form the Canadian Forces, the RCAMC was deactivated in the Regular Force, and its personnel absorbed by the re-organized CFMS, which became a personnel branch of the new Canadian Forces. Reserve units of the RCAMC continued to exist, using their RCAMC titles, until re-organization of the Reserve Force in 1974, when the corps' final disbandment was effected.

== Related units ==
This unit was allied with the following:

- Royal Army Medical Corps

== See also ==
- List of armouries in Canada
- Military history of Canada
- History of the Canadian Army
- Helen Kendall
