= Caribou (train) =

Defunct passenger train line for the island of Newfoundland

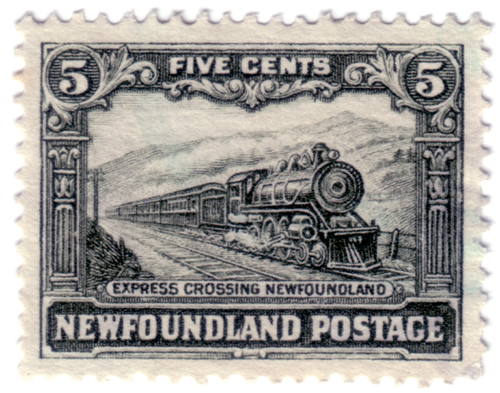
- Postage Stamp of Express service

Overview
- Service type: Inter-city rail
- Status: Defunct
- Locale: Newfoundland
- Predecessor: Overland Limited (until 1949)
- Last service: June 1969
- Former operators: Newfoundland Railway (1898–1949); Canadian National Railway (1950–June 1969)

Route
- Termini: St. John's; Port aux Basques
- Distance travelled: 883 kilometres (549 mi)
- Average journey time: 23 hours

Technical
- Track gauge: 3 ft 6 in (1,067 mm)
- Track owners: CN & Newfoundland T'Railway

The Caribou, colloquially referred to as The Newfie Bullet, was a passenger train operated by Canadian National Railways (CNR) on the island of Newfoundland.

== History ==
The Dominion of Newfoundland became the 10th province of Canada when it entered Confederation on March 31, 1949. At that time, CNR took over the operations of the Newfoundland Railway, a 3 ft 6 in (1,067 mm) narrow gauge railway network running across the island.

At the time that CNR took over operations, the premier cross-island passenger train was called The Overland Limited. CNR renamed this train in 1950 to the Caribou, and it maintained approximately the same 23-hour schedule from St. John's (also the eastern terminus of the railway on Newfoundland), to the system's western terminus at the ferry terminal in Port aux Basques, where connecting ferry services to the North American railway network at North Sydney, Nova Scotia, were made.

The 23 hour schedule sealed the fate of the Caribou when the Trans-Canada Highway opened across the island in 1965, allowing automobiles to travel between Port aux Basques and St. John's in under 12 hours. CN withdrew the dedicated passenger trains in July 1969 and instituted a bus service, marketed under the name "Road Cruiser." CN maintained limited "mixed" passenger and freight train service to certain isolated communities on the island until the complete abandonment of its narrow gauge system in the fall of 1988. The CN Roadcruiser Bus service operated until March 29, 1996, when it was sold to DRL Coachlines of Triton, Newfoundland.

== See also ==
- Terra Transport
- Newfoundland T'Railway
- Canadian National
- Newfoundland Railway
