= Harmon Links =

Golf course in Newfoundland, Canada

Coordinates: 48°31′39.03″N 58°33′02.98″W

Harmon Seaside Links
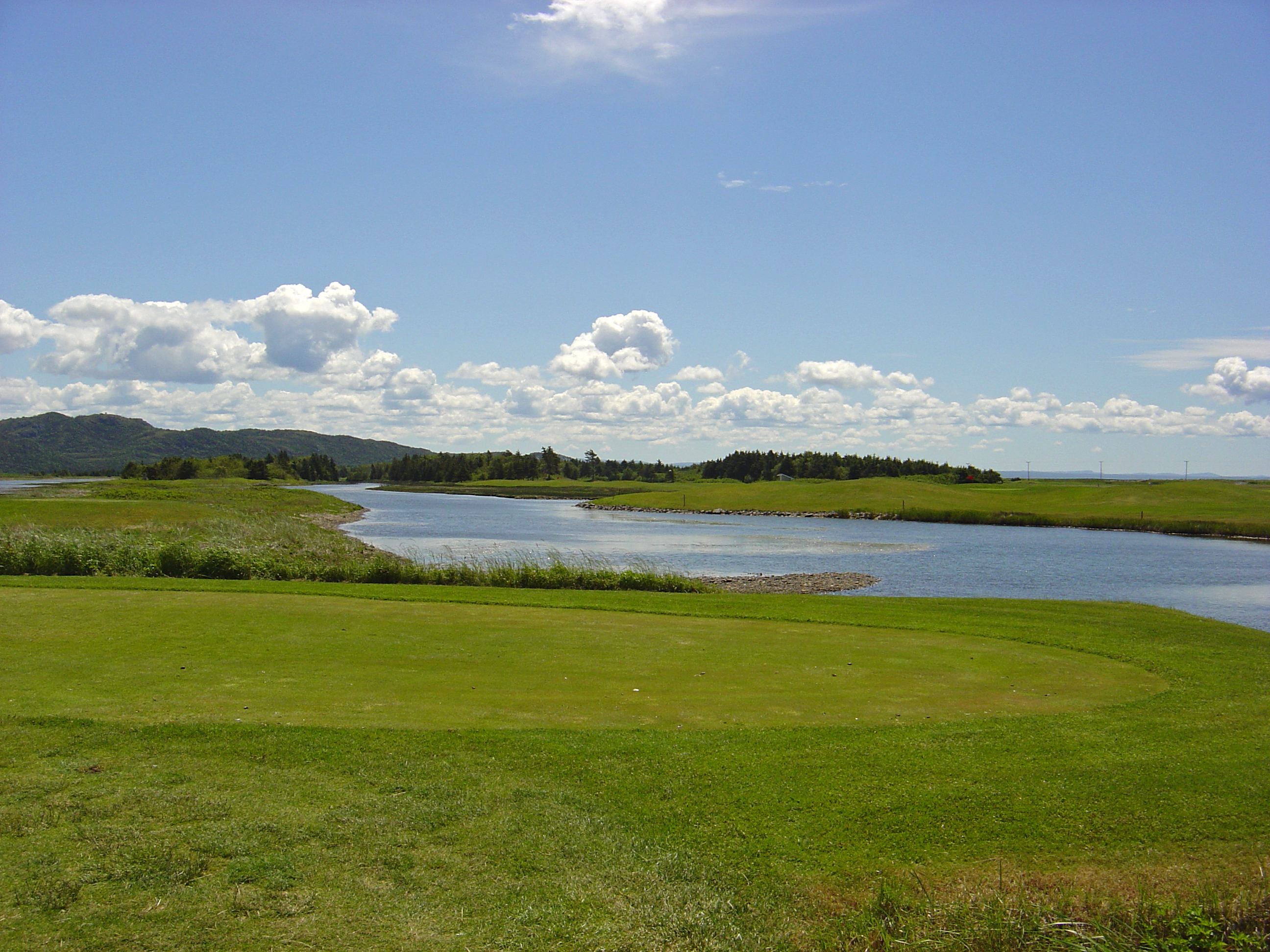
- Interactive map of Harmon Seaside Links

Club information
- Location: Stephenville, Newfoundland, Canada
- Tota holes: 18
- Website: www.harmonseasidelinks.com
- Designed by: Graham Cooke
- Par: 72
- Length: 6588 yards
- Course rating: 121

Harmon Seaside Links is a public golf course located in western Newfoundland in the town of Stephenville, Canada. The course was the first true links course in Canada and plays along the coast of the Gulf of St. Lawrence adjacent to Stephenville International Airport. The total length is around 6588 yards.

== See also ==
- List of golf courses in Newfoundland and Labrador
