= Maxim Mazumdar =

Canadian writer

- Born: 27 January 1952; Mumbai, India
- Died: 28 April 1988 (aged 36); Halifax, Nova Scotia, Canada
- Education: Loyola College
- Occupations: Actor, Playwright, Director

Maxim Mazumdar (27 January 1952 – 28 April 1988) was an Indo-Canadian playwright and director. He is known for his one-man show, Oscar Remembered, which tells the story of the Irish playwright Oscar Wilde as seen from the perspective of his lover and nemesis, Lord Alfred Douglas.

Mazumdar is the founder of the Phoenix Theatre in Montreal, Quebec, as well as the Provincial Drama Academy and the Stephenville Theatre Festival in Stephenville, Newfoundland.

== Early life ==
Maxim Mazumdar was born 27 January 1952 to Millicent and Dr. Mark Mazumdar, a dentist. He grew up in their family home at Charni Road, Mumbai, India. Mazumdar attended Campion School in Mumbai. During this time, he had roles in several school productions. He acted in Apsalom, Ordeal by Battle, and Oliver Twist, where he played the role of Fagin. Upon the death of his father in 1969, Mazumdar immigrated to Montreal, Quebec, Canada, along with his mother and brother, Malcolm.

Mazumdar enrolled in Loyola College (now part of Concordia University) in Montreal. He graduated in 1972 with a BA degree in Communication Arts. Afterwards, Mazumdar earned an MA in Theater at Brooklyn College in 1985.

== Career ==
Towards the end of his last year at Loyola, Mazumdar joined Janet Barkhouse, Jordan Deitcher and Sharron Wall in founding Raven Productions. Over a period of two years, they presented Shakespeare, Wilde, Coward and Beckett in both traditional venues and as "Salon Theatre" around Montreal. Their 1973 production of Edward Albee's Who's Afraid of Virginia Woolf, in which Mazumdar played Martha as a man, gained international notoriety after its closing by the author was written about in the New York Times and elsewhere.

Later, Mazumdar co-founded the now-defunct Phoenix Theatre in Montreal. The theatre was intended for English productions. While at Phoenix, he directed and acted in his own works, as well as works by Noël Coward.

It was while at Phoenix that Mazumdar wrote Oscar Remembered, a two-act play that examined the friendship between Oscar Wilde and Lord Alfred Douglas. He performed his monologue across the US and Canada, including at the Stratford Festival.

After leaving the Phoenix Theatre, Mazumdar continued to write and direct his own plays, including Rimbaud and Dance for Gods. His works explored various aspects of gay history.

While adjudicating at the Newfoundland and Labrador Drama Festival in 1979, Mazumdar was impressed with the quality of the local productions. He decided to establish the Provincial Drama Academy in Stephenville, Newfoundland, offering theatre training to local youth. That same year, Mazumdar established the Stephenville Theatre Festival with the aim of bringing a professional theatre experience to the people in western Newfoundland. The Stephenville Theatre Festival was the first professional theatre festival in Newfoundland and Labrador.

Over the next nine years, Mazumdar served as artistic director to the festival. During this time, he led the production of several performances in collaboration with director Edmund MacLean and executive producer Cheryl Stagg. Notable productions included Macbeth, Jesus Christ Superstar, The Man Who Came To Dinner, and Cyrano de Bergerac.

Mazumdar united once again with director Jordan Deitcher for two shows in New York City, playing King Lear in Raven's 1984 production at the Park Royal Theatre, and writing and appearing in the 1985 Off-Broadway world premiere of The Bentley Variations (aka Unholy Trinity), a cabaret about the role and treatment of the visionary in society, based on the works of Eric Bentley.

== Death ==
Mazumdar died of AIDS in Halifax, Nova Scotia, on 28 April 1988. Following his death, his play, Oscar Remembered, was revived at Stratford in 2000.

In Mazumdar's honour, the Alleyway Theatre in Buffalo, New York grants the annual Maxim Mazumdar New Play Competition Award. It is given in remembrance of his contributions to the early growth of Alleyway.

== Legacy ==
Maxim Mazumdar's time developing and producing the Stephenville Theatre Festival with his friend Cheryl Stagg was the focus of the College of the North Atlantic's 2018 Digital Filmmaking intersession film project The Impossible Dream.
