= Western College =

Western College may refer to:

- Western College for Women, Oxford, Ohio, US
- Western College of Veterinary Medicine, Saskatoon, Saskatchewan, Canada
- Western College (Iowa), US
- Western College, Bristol, England
- Western College, Stephenville, Newfoundland, Canada
