= Mattie Mitchell =

Mi'kmaq chieftain, guide, and explorer

Matty Mitchell
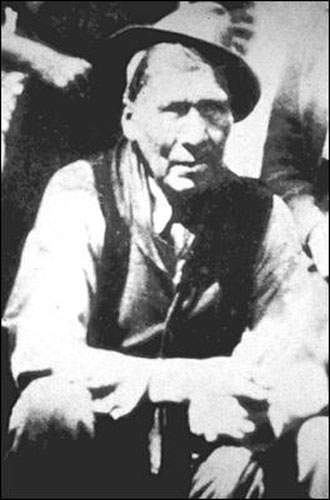
- Mattie Mitchell, ca. 1920.
- Born: June 1846; Halls Bay, Colony of Newfoundland
- Died: 1922; Corner Brook, Dominion of Newfoundland
- Occupations: Mi’kmaq Chieftain, Explorer
- Spouse: Mary Ann Webb

Matty Mitchell (June 1846 – 1922; most sources use the first name Matty, some recent versions "Mattie") was a Mi’kmaq chieftain, guide, prospector, and explorer who contributed to the development of the Newfoundland economy. Mitchell has been described as "the greatest and most resourceful woodsman who ever lived." For this, Mitchell was recognized as a Person of National Historic Significance in 2001.

== Biography ==
Mitchell was born in Halls Bay in June 1846.

On 26 May 1879, he was married to Mary Ann Webb at Sandy Point. On the marriage certificate his name is transcribed as 'Matthieu Michel (Indien)'. Together they had a son, also named Mattie (Matty) Michell. In 1885, the family moved to Bonne Bay, where he lived the remainder of his life.

In 1904, Mitchell was hired to chart the Great Northern Peninsula, working under H. C. Thomson. His extensive knowledge of waterways and other geographical features culminated in the first map drawings of the region.

In 1905, Mitchell, while contracted by the Anglo-Newfoundland Development, discovered the Buchans ore body, one of the world's most productive massive sulphide deposits. Subsequent development led to the creation of Buchans, as well as "many thousands of person-years of employment, shared by three generations of Newfoundlanders." Since the discovery, the site has generated 16.2 million tonnes of high-grade zinc, lead, copper, gold and silver ore with a gross value of approximately $14 billion.

During his life, he also guided the workers of the Newfoundland Railway on how to construct a railroad through western Newfoundland and into the central part of the province, using only his knowledge of the land.

Mitchell died in 1922 at his Son's home in Corner Brook.

== Legacy ==
In 1998, the government of Newfoundland and Labrador opened the Matty Mitchell Prospectors Resource Room. Mitchell is also honored at the Mattie Mitchell National Historic Site and Trail in Gros Morne National Park.

On 26 June 2005, Stéphane Dion, Minister of the Environment, and Gerry Byrne, MP for Humber—St. Barbe—Baie Verte, unveiled a memorial plaque in his honour at Gros Morne National Park. Among them were Chief Mi'sel Joe of the Miawpukek First Nation, Conne River; Brendan Sheppard, President of the Federation of Newfoundland Indians; and Marie Mitchell-Sparkes, Mattie Mitchell's granddaughter.

During the ceremony, Byrne addresses the crowd on Mitchell's achievement:

"It was Mitchell's outstanding knowledge of the land that allowed him to make such important contributions to the economy and culture of Newfoundland. His legacy is still alive and very well respected in this province, and now throughout all of Canada. It is a pleasure to honour this man who has had such a large role to play in shaping our Canadian heritage."

In 2011, a biography was written about Mitchell by Gary Collins, an award-winning author.

In 2013, a student film, entitled A Mattie Mitchell Story, was made. The film stars Mattie's own great-grandson, Alonzo Rumbolt, in the title role.

In 2015, Mitchell's great-grandson Brendan Mitchell was elected Chief of Qalipu Mi'kmaq First Nation Band. Another of Mitchell's great grandchildren, Geoff Sparkes, challenged Brendan Mitchell in the 2021 Qalipu First Nation Band elections which was unsuccessful.

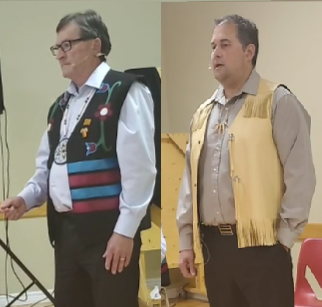
Mattie Mitchell's great grandsons, Chief Brendan Mitchell and Geoff Sparkes at the Mi'kmaq Matters Qalipu Leadership Debate, October 12, 2021
