= Arts and Culture Centre =

Coordinates: 47.575726°N 52.729612°W

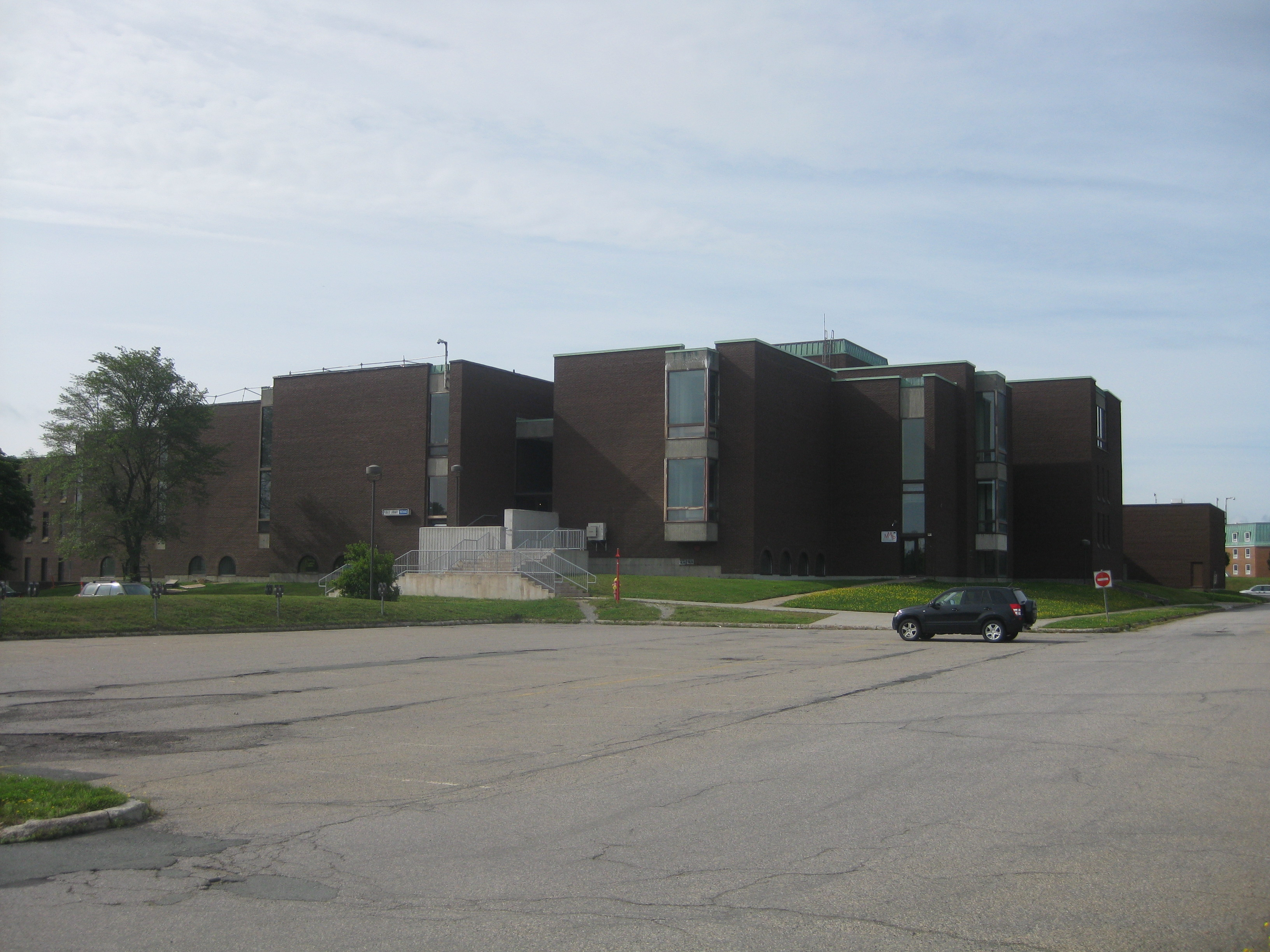
The St. John's Arts and Culture Centre.

The Arts and Culture Centres are a system of six arts centres in the province of Newfoundland and Labrador, operated by the provincial government's Department of Tourism, Culture, Arts and Recreation (TCAR). Each has a least one stage for the performing arts; some also house an art gallery or exhibition area, a public library, and (in Gander and Corner Brook) a swimming pool.

The "Arts and Culture Centre" name is shared by five of these centres, namely those in St. John's (opened in 1967), Corner Brook, Gander, Stephenville, and Labrador City. The location in Grand Falls-Windsor was renamed the Gordon Pinsent Centre for the Arts in July 2005.

== St. John's ==
Opened on May 22, 1967 in Pippy Park, St. John's, the St. John's Arts and Culture Centre has a 1,000-seat proscenium main theatre, a 75-seat black box basement theatre, public libraries for children and adults, art galleries and catering services.
