= Newfoundland T'Railway =

Recreational trail in Canada

Newfoundland T'Railway Provincial Park
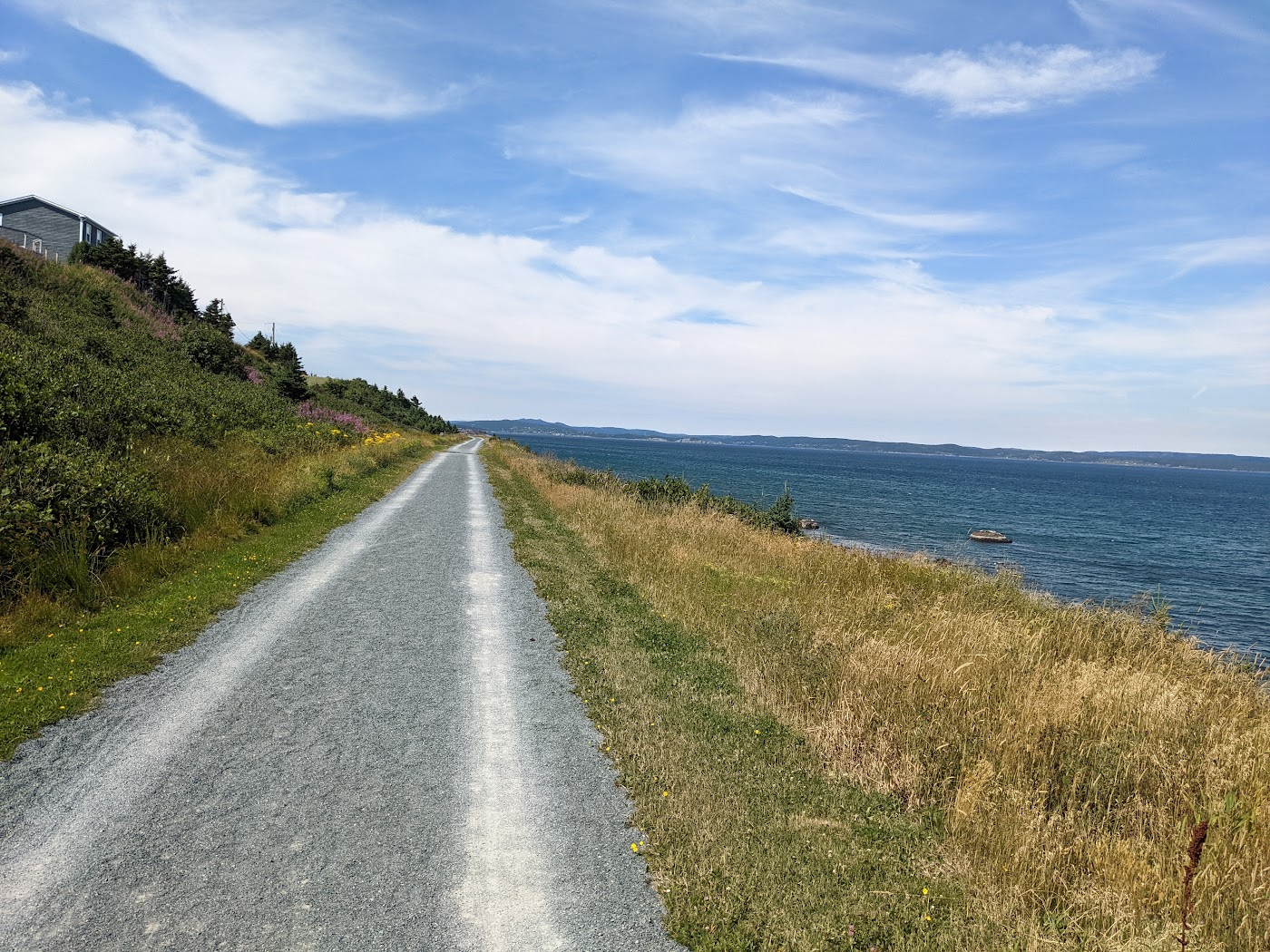
- T'Railway in Conception Bay South. This is an example of an urban crusher dust section.
- Interactive map of Newfoundland T'Railway Provincial Park
- Location: Newfoundland and Labrador
- Established: July 1997

The Newfoundland T'Railway Provincial Park is a rail trail located in the Canadian province of Newfoundland and Labrador.

Protected as a linear park under the provincial park system, the Newfoundland T'Railway consists of the railbed of the historic Newfoundland Railway, later renamed Terra Transport as transferred from its most recent owner, Canadian National Railway (CN), to the provincial government after rail service was abandoned on the island of Newfoundland in 1988. The rail corridor stretches from Channel-Port aux Basques in the west to St. John's in the east with branches to Stephenville, Lewisporte, Bonavista, Placentia and Carbonear.

The Newfoundland T'Railway forms part of the Trans Canada Trail system and covers a distance of 883 km (549 mi), making it the longest rail trail in Canada.

== History ==
Construction of the railway began in 1881. The first passenger train traveled from St. John's to Channel-Port aux Basques on June 29, 1898. The railway was abandoned in September 1988 and the last rails removed in 1990, whereby the Government of Newfoundland and Labrador acquired the property from CN. The Newfoundland T'Railway was established in July 1997 as a rail trail. This linear park uses both the railbed and bridges.

In February 2008, the provincial government announced that they were closing every bridge and trestle along the route pending safety inspections. Government officials admitted that regular inspections are not performed on the structures. Transport Canada inspected 14 structures and found them to be in a wide state of disrepair. In some cases debris is starting to fall off bridges. The Federal government got involved due to its responsibility to ensure the safety of navigable waters. By 2010 all 130 bridges had been upgraded under a $3 million program funded by the federal government's Atlantic Canada Opportunities Agency, the Government of Newfoundland and Labrador and the Trans Canada Trail Foundation.

Sections of the Newfoundland T'Railway in the Clarenville-Bonavista area were washed out on September 21, 2010 due to heavy rain resulting from Hurricane Igor with subsequent repairs taking several years to complete. Sections in the Gander-Clarenville area were washed out on October 10, 2016 due to heavy rain with repairs lasting into summer 2017.

The trail is still a work in progress. To date, about 20% of it has been resurfaced with crusher dust or asphalt (mostly near urban areas) making it suitable for walking, running, cross-country skiing, cycling, wheelchairs, horseback riding, all terrain vehicles, and snowmobiles. The remaining 80% of the trail surface is still large crushed stone railway track ballast with conditions varying from region to region. Several bridges and culverts are usually undergoing repair or replacement every year. Trail signs have been posted in most urban areas.

In 2020, a 20-kilometre stretch near Maccles Lake was approved for temporary use by heavy forestry harvesting equipment.

== Missing sections ==
When CN abandoned the rail system on Newfoundland in September 1988, the main line was contiguous between St. John's in the east and Channel-Port aux Basques in the west and most branches were contiguous from their junction points with the main line to their respective termini. However, the Newfoundland T'Railway is not a contiguous system due to land use changes that have impacted several locations along the former rail corridor.

=== Corner Brook ===
The majority of the Newfoundland T'Railway is missing within the city of Corner Brook. A 2 km (1.2 mi) gap exists in the Curling neighbourhood between Hilliards Road in the west and Barretts Road in the east. This gap is partly due to a culvert washout, as well as appropriation of the rail corridor for public streets, including a section of Griffin Drive, Barry Place and Star Street. A 0.6 km (0.37 mi) gap exists in the Westside neighbourhood between Leggos Avenue through to the east end of St Aldens Road, partly due to appropriation of the rail corridor for public streets and partly due to non-development of the rail corridor into a trail which has resulted in it being impassable. A 4.4 km (2.7 mi) gap exists in the city's downtown and Humbermouth neighbourhoods, between Pier Road in the west through to Humber Road in the east. This is partly due to non-development of the rail corridor as it passes the pulp mill and Port of Corner Brook, as well as appropriation of the rail corridor for public streets, including a section of Riverside Drive. The port property largely occupies the former railway yard and the trail is non-existent in this area.

=== Corner Brook to Pasadena ===
The Government of Newfoundland and Labrador received an $800 million settlement from the federal government to allow abandonment of the railway in 1988. This funding was delivered through several programs, one of which was named the Trans-Canada Highway Program and was intended solely for upgrading Newfoundland and Labrador Route 1, which carries the Trans-Canada Highway designation on the island of Newfoundland.

During the mid-1990s before the establishment of the Newfoundland T'Railway, the Government of Newfoundland and Labrador used some of the funding from the Trans-Canada Highway Program to upgrade Route 1 between Corner Brook and Deer Lake from 2-lanes to 4-lanes. A section of the abandoned rail corridor between the Humbermouth neighbourhood of Corner Brook to Pasadena was removed in order to accommodate the highway expansion and realignment. This occurred in the narrow Humber River valley as well as along the southwest shore of Deer Lake. Some sections of the former rail corridor were also appropriated for public roads to access residential subdivisions. These developments have resulted in a gap on the Newfoundland T'Railway of approximately 25 km (16 mi) between Humber Road in the west through to the end of Tipping Drive in the east.

=== Gander ===
A 0.6 km (0.37 mi) section of the rail corridor within the town of Gander has been appropriated for a retail development, however, the town has built a 1.1 km (0.68 mi) bypass for the trail around this property, keeping the contiguity of the trail intact through the town.

=== Clarenville ===
A 0.25 km (0.16 mi) section of the main line in the Shoal Harbour neighbourhood of the town of Clarenville has been realigned due to construction of Shoal Harbour Drive. This road has also resulted in a gap of 0.25 km (0.16 mi) of the Bonavista branch between Thistle Place and Huntley Drive.

Additional gaps exist on the main line in Conception Bay South as well as on the Carbonear branch.

== See also ==
- List of Newfoundland and Labrador parks
- List of rail trails
- Newfoundland Railway
- Terra Transport
