= Halls Bay =

Bay in Canada

Coordinates: 49°30′33″N 55°59′32″W

Location of Halls Bay in Newfoundland

You may be looking for Hall Basin

Halls Bay (also spelled Hall's Bay and Hall Bay in the historical record) is a natural bay located near the Baie Verte Peninsula of the island of Newfoundland, in the Canadian province of Newfoundland and Labrador.

Halls Bay has been the determining point for the northern route of the Newfoundland Railway and then the location of the Trans-Canada Highway and is commonly referred to as the Halls Bay Line. Communities located in Halls Bay are; Springdale, South Brook and Port Anson.

The Bay is believed to be named after a Captain Hall, who may have established a colonial settlement there in the 1820s to prosecute the local salmon fishery. A local legend claims Hall may have lost his head there in a conflict with Indigenous people, but historians of the same period disputed this.

== Notable people ==
- Mattie Mitchell (1846-1921) - Mi’kmaq Chieftain, guide, prospector, and explorer.
