= Stephenville, Newfoundland and Labrador =

Stephenville
- Town
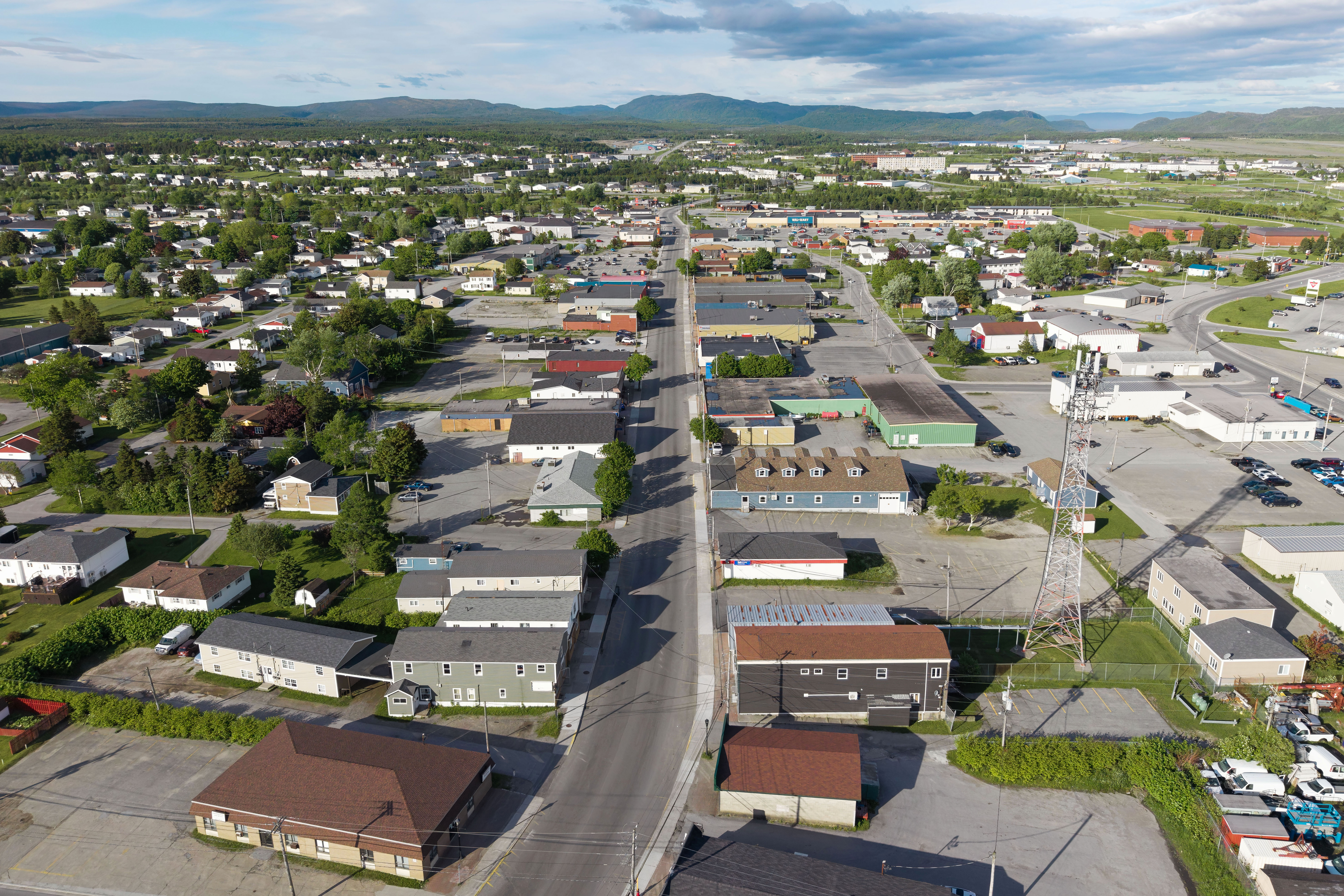
- Downtown (2026)

- Seal

- Location of Stephenville in Newfoundland
- Coordinates: 48°33′N 58°34′W
- Country: Canada
- Province: Newfoundland and Labrador
- Incorporated: 1952

Government
  - Mayor: Brad Lucas
  - Governing body: Stephenville Town Council
  - Brad MHA: Tony Wakeham (PC)
  - MP: Carol Anstey (C)

Area
  - Total: 35.69 km^{2} (13.78 sq mi)
- Elevation: 0–74 m (0–243 ft)

Population (2021)^{[1]}
  - Total: 6,540
  - Density: 185.6/km^{2} (481/sq mi)
- Time zone: UTC-3:30 (Newfoundland Time)
  - Summer (DST): UTC-2:30 (Newfoundland Daylight)
- Postal code span: A2N
- Area code: 709
- Telephone Exchange: 214, 283, 643, 649, 641 and 721
- Median Family Income*: $61,184
- NTS Map: 012B10
- GNBC Code: AAXZD
- Highways: Route 460; Route 490
- Website: Town of Stephenville official website
- Median income in 2015 - All census economic families ($)

Stephenville (Canada 2021 Census population 6,540) is a town in Newfoundland and Labrador, Canada, on the west coast of the island of Newfoundland.

The town functions as a local service centre for the southwestern part of the island, serving a direct population of 35,000 people from surrounding areas and over 100,000 people along the entire southwestern coast of the island.

The primary employer in the town was a paper mill, which closed in 2005.

Stephenville has a modern 40-bed hospital (built in 2003), schools, grocery stores, a movie theatre, four banks, an International Airport (Stephenville International Airport, CYJT, now named Dymond International Airport), year round ice free sea port (Port Harmon), and many government institutions. The provincial community college system, College of the North Atlantic, is headquartered in Stephenville and maintains a campus there for students from the southwestern region of the island. The Newfoundland and Labrador Public Library system is also headquartered in Stephenville. A provincial minimum/medium security facility was established in 1978 and provides core programs for federal and provincial offenders at the West Coast Corrections Centre (W.C.C.C.).

== History ==
The Stephenville area was formerly known as the Acadian village, between 1848 and 1870. The populace of the village consisted of Roman Catholics who eked out a living, farming and fishing. The town's population continued to grow because of the stable economy. It was also formerly home to Ernest Harmon AFB, which was operated by the United States Army Air Forces and later the United States Air Force from 1941 to 1966.

The base precipitated an economic boom of sorts on Newfoundland's southwest coast during the 1940s. Corner Brook to the northeast had been considered the major population center for the region, given its industrial base and nearby recreational opportunities in the Humber River. With the massive investment of the Government of the United States in the base, the Stephenville and St. George's Bay area began to flourish. The village of Stephenville grew from a hamlet of several hundred people with no paved streets, sidewalks, water or sewage system in 1941 into a modern town of over 5,000 by the mid-1950s. By the time Ernest Harmon AFB closed in 1966, the town had more than doubled in size, partly as a result of the provincial government's forced resettlement policy toward residents of outports.

After the base was closed, the facility was turned over to the federal government which then provided it to the provincial government to diversify the local community.

The facility included the air field, which has two runways (10,000 ft x 200 ft, 4,000 ft x 150 ft) and numerous buildings which are operated as the Stephenville International Airport. An abandoned USAF Pinetree Line radar site is located on nearby Table Mountain, north of the town. The town uses many former USAF structures for housing, recreation and entertainment.

In 2005, Abitibi closed the town's pulp and paper mill. At the time of closure the mill had approximately 300 full-time and part-time employees.

== Transportation ==
The Stephenville International Airport ceased offering regularly scheduled commercial flights in 2020.

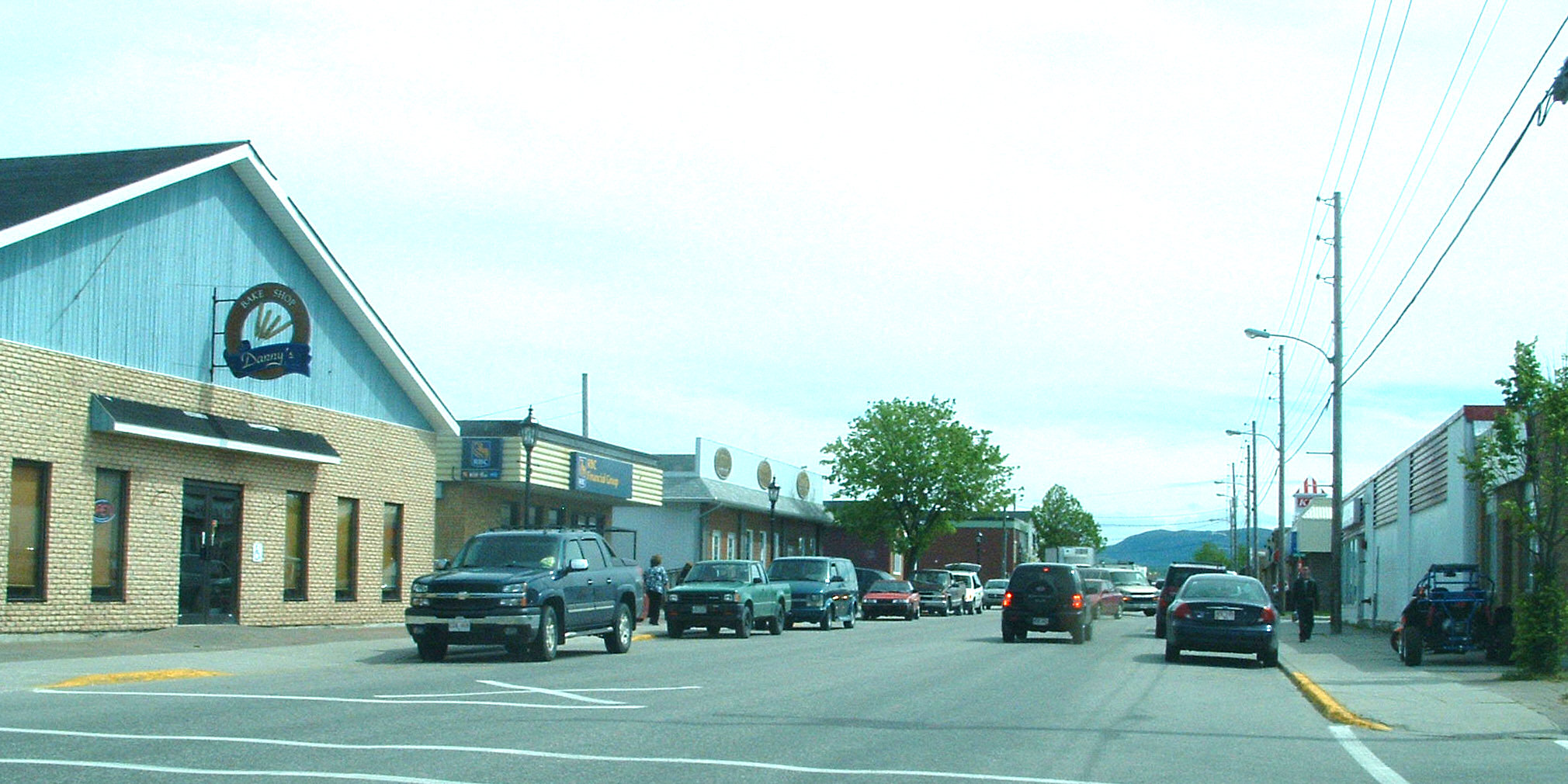
Main Street, Stephenville

Daily intraprovincial bus service connecting to major population centres and ferry terminals across the island is provided by DRL Coachlines. Dedicated bus service between Stephenville and Corner Brook is provided by Eddy's Bus Services. Dedicated bus service between Stephenville and Port aux Basques is provided by Gateway Bus Service.

Two taxi companies serve the town: Blue Bird Taxi and King's Cab. The former Crown Taxi is now a defunct company.

The town is located 15 kilometres northwest of the Trans-Canada Highway, and is accessible using Provincial Highway Routes 490 and 460.

Rail service to the town, as well as all of Newfoundland, was discontinued by Terra Transport in 1988.

The density of the town core, and its flat topography, permit residents to enjoy outdoor activities such as walking, bicycling, roller blading, and cross-country skiing.

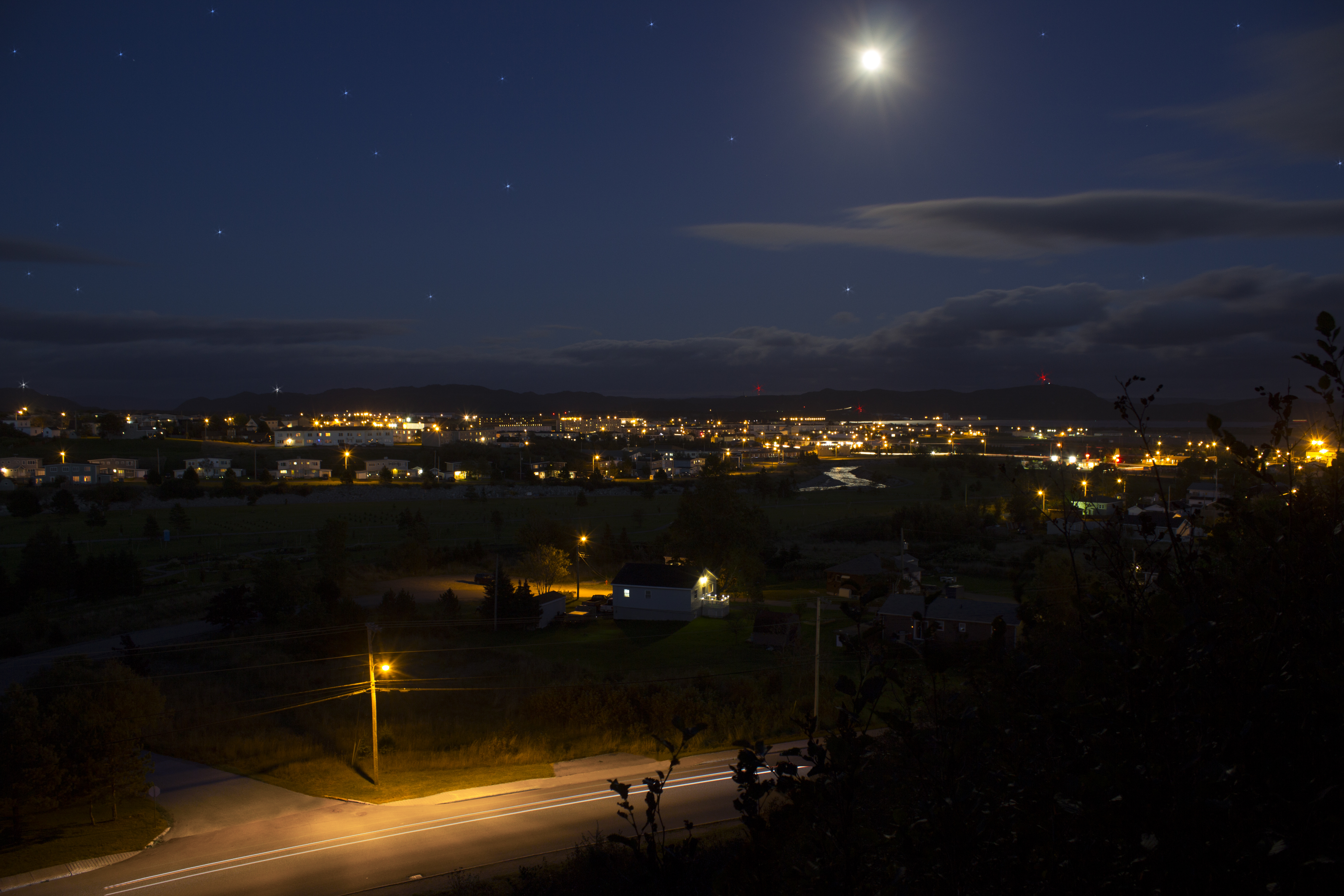
Stephenville at Night

== Education ==
The first educational institution in the Bay St. George area was the Roman Catholic Church. Bishop John T. Mullock established the first church of the Roman Catholic faith at Sandy Point in 1848 when the population of the area was about 2,000. Father Belenger was the first priest in the St. Georges Bay area from 1850 to 1868. Father Sears, then priest in the area, established a church in the growing town of Stephenville. In 1884, there were four Catholic schools in the parish, one at Sandy Point, one at the Highlands, one at Port aux Basques and one at Campbell's Creek.

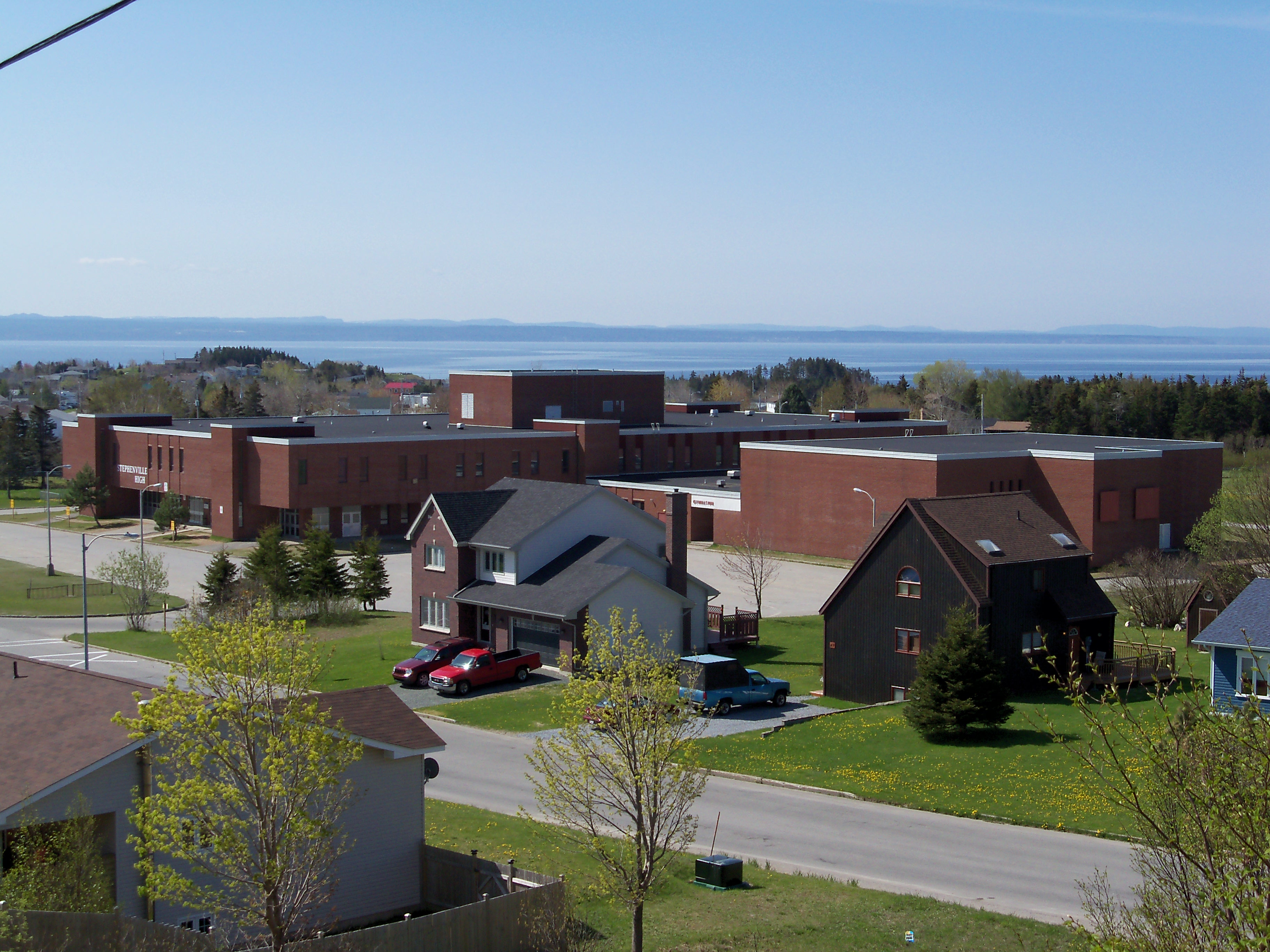
Stephenville High School, formerly St. Stephen's High School, in Stephenville, Newfoundland and Labrador

Today, Stephenville is served by four schools: Stephenville Primary, Stephenville Elementary and Stephenville Middle Schools, which are feeder schools for Stephenville High School. SHS also takes in students from St. Thomas Aquinas School in Port-au-Port East.

Stephenville is also home to the Bay St. George campus of College of the North Atlantic (CNA), which is Newfoundland and Labrador's public college system. The provincial Headquarters for CNA is located in the D.S.B Fowlow Building of the campus.

Western College is also located in Stephenville. Formerly known as CompuCollege, the Western College is an affiliate of Eastern College.

== Geography ==
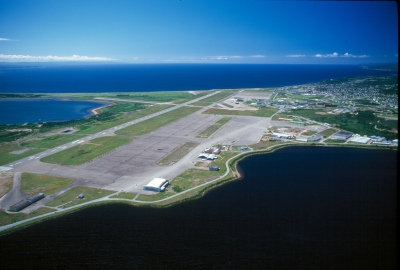
Stephenville International Airport

The town is located on the northeast coast of Bay St. George in southwestern Newfoundland, and on the Atlantic Ocean. It is situated on a small plateau and surrounded by the Long Range Mountains and Lewis Hills on either side. The downtown area lies to the north of the Stephenville International Airport, and the rest of the town expands primarily to the northwest.

The town is bisected by Blanche Brook, a small river which runs roughly north to south before meeting Warm Brook, which flows roughly east to west, before both empty in Bay St. George. The original town of Stephenville is situated on the west side of the brook while the east side consists of the area which was once part of Ernest Harmon Air Force Base. There are 4 bridges which span Blanche Brook: Hansen Highway Bridge, Blanche Brook Bridge (Main Street), Columbus Bridge (Minnesota Drive) and the newest West Street Bridge built after the 2005 flood. 3 smaller bridges span Warm Brook, located at: Mississippi Drive, Carolina Avenue and Connecticut Drive. Another waterway, Gaudon's Brook, forms the western border with Kippens.

The brooks have been used to create a greenbelt/park area that extends through the centre of town, including Blanche Brook Park which was constructed following the destruction of a neighbourhood which formerly occupied the same space.

=== Climate ===
Stephenville has a maritime-influenced humid continental climate (Köppen Dfb). While continental patterns dominate with vast seasonal differences and extremely snowy winters, seasonal lag is prevalent as a result of the seawater warming slowly. As a result, summer normals peak in August, with September being warmer than June in spite of the rapidly descending sun strength. Winters are dominated by the high snowfall, but also can see rainy spells during milder weather, which can occur year-round.

Climate data for Stephenville (Stephenville International Airport) Climate ID: 8403800; coordinates 48°32′29″N 58°33′00″W; elevation: 24.7 m (81 ft); WMO ID: 71815; 1991–2020 normals, extremes 1942–present
Month	Jan	Feb	Mar	Apr	May	Jun	Jul	Aug	Sep	Oct	Nov	Dec	Year
Record high humidex	15.0	13.0	19.5	26.0	28.8	36.1	40.1	37.0	36.1	27.1	24.7	18.6	40.1
Record high °C (°F)	14.6 (58.3)	12.7 (54.9)	19.7 (67.5)	23.8 (74.8)	27.2 (81.0)	30.0 (86.0)	30.7 (87.3)	29.9 (85.8)	29.1 (84.4)	22.4 (72.3)	20.6 (69.1)	16.1 (61.0)	30.7 (87.3)
Mean daily maximum °C (°F)	−2.1 (28.2)	−2.5 (27.5)	0.7 (33.3)	6.0 (42.8)	11.8 (53.2)	16.6 (61.9)	20.3 (68.5)	21.1 (70.0)	16.9 (62.4)	11.3 (52.3)	5.9 (42.6)	1.0 (33.8)	8.9 (48.0)
Daily mean °C (°F)	−5.6 (21.9)	−6.4 (20.5)	−3.3 (26.1)	2.2 (36.0)	7.4 (45.3)	12.2 (54.0)	16.5 (61.7)	17.1 (62.8)	13.0 (55.4)	7.8 (46.0)	3.0 (37.4)	−1.9 (28.6)	5.2 (41.4)
Mean daily minimum °C (°F)	−9.0 (15.8)	−10.2 (13.6)	−7.3 (18.9)	−1.6 (29.1)	3.0 (37.4)	7.8 (46.0)	12.6 (54.7)	13.1 (55.6)	9.1 (48.4)	4.3 (39.7)	0.0 (32.0)	−4.8 (23.4)	1.4 (34.5)
Record low °C (°F)	−26.1 (−15.0)	−29.5 (−21.1)	−29.2 (−20.6)	−16.1 (3.0)	−7.1 (19.2)	−1.1 (30.0)	3.5 (38.3)	2.2 (36.0)	−0.7 (30.7)	−5.6 (21.9)	−14.9 (5.2)	−20.2 (−4.4)	−29.5 (−21.1)
Record low wind chill	−38.2	−41.4	−38.1	−26.0	−13.2	−3.7	0.0	0.0	−4.0	−9.9	−21.6	−35.6	−41.4
Average precipitation mm (inches)	120.7 (4.75)	107.4 (4.23)	89.0 (3.50)	77.7 (3.06)	99.7 (3.93)	92.9 (3.66)	114.5 (4.51)	117.3 (4.62)	131.2 (5.17)	129.9 (5.11)	119.1 (4.69)	117.0 (4.61)	1,316.3 (51.82)
Average rainfall mm (inches)	29.5 (1.16)	23.1 (0.91)	39.9 (1.57)	62.1 (2.44)	96.3 (3.79)	92.9 (3.66)	114.5 (4.51)	117.3 (4.62)	131.2 (5.17)	127.0 (5.00)	98.4 (3.87)	46.5 (1.83)	978.5 (38.52)
Average snowfall cm (inches)	106.7 (42.0)	96.6 (38.0)	54.6 (21.5)	16.7 (6.6)	3.3 (1.3)	0.0 (0.0)	0.0 (0.0)	0.0 (0.0)	0.0 (0.0)	2.7 (1.1)	24.0 (9.4)	81.2 (32.0)	385.9 (151.9)
Average precipitation days (≥ 0.2 mm)	26.1	22.3	18.0	15.5	15.4	13.8	15.2	15.2	15.4	19.6	20.3	24.6	221.4
Average rainy days (≥ 0.2 mm)	5.5	4.2	6.5	11.0	14.9	13.8	15.2	15.2	15.4	19.3	15.0	8.1	144.0
Average snowy days (≥ 0.2 cm)	24.5	24.1	15.4	7.4	1.5	0.0	0.0	0.0	0.08	1.6	9.0	21.1	101.6
Average relative humidity (%) (at 1500 LST)	78.9	76.8	72.6	68.2	66.7	68.7	72.9	71.6	71.8	72.5	75.8	78.3	72.9
Mean monthly sunshine hours	41.9	73.3	116.7	141.7	205.2	204.2	206.2	201.6	145.7	114.1	50.1	26.6	1,527.3
Percentage possible sunshine	15.4	25.6	31.7	34.6	43.5	42.4	42.4	45.4	38.5	33.9	18.0	10.2	31.8
Source: Environment Canada (sun 1981–2010)

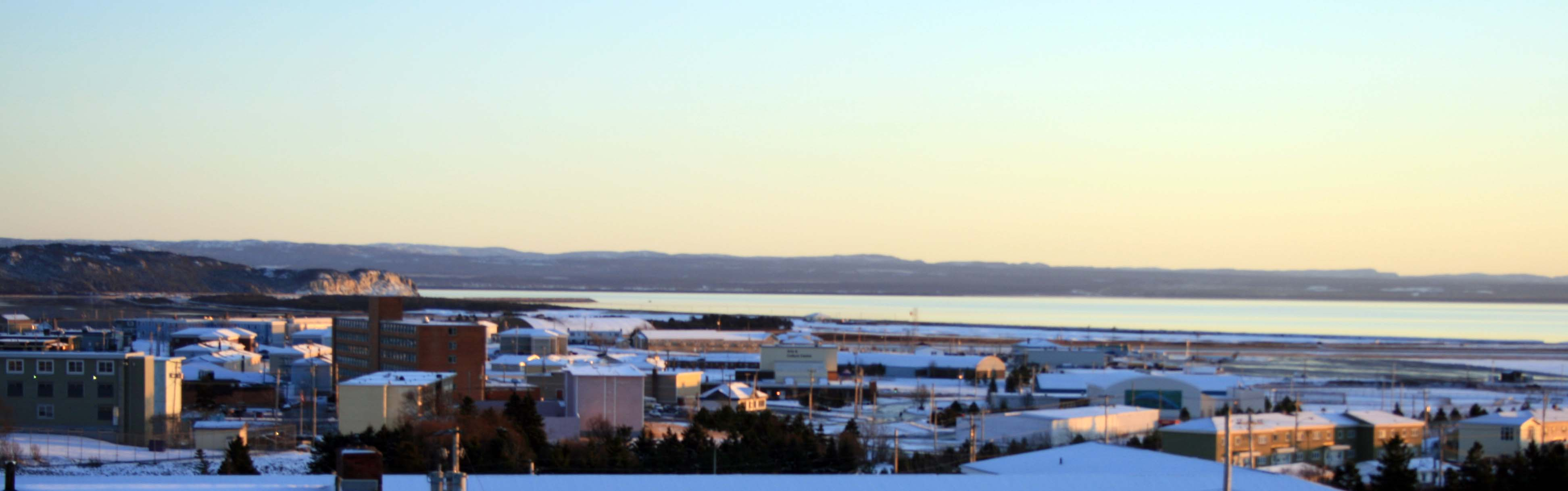
Stephenville Cityscape

== Demographics ==
Historical population
Year	Pop.	±%
1901	643	—
1911	826	+28.5%
1920	817	−1.1%
1935	926	+13.3%
1951	5,910	+538.2%
1961	6,043	+2.3%
1972	12,500	+106.9%
1981	8,875	−29.0%
1986	7,994	−9.9%
1991	7,621	−4.7%
1996	7,764	+1.9%
2001	7,109	−8.4%
2006	6,588	−7.3%
2011	6,719	+2.0%
2016	6,623	−1.4%
2021	6,540	−1.3%

In the 2021 Census of Population conducted by Statistics Canada, Stephenville had a population of 6,540 living in 3,188 of its 3,412 total private dwellings, a change of −1.3% from its 2016 population of 6,623. With a land area of 35.27 km^{2} (13.62 sq mi), it had a population density of 185.4/km^{2} (480.3/sq mi) in 2021.

Canada 2016 Census		Population	% of Total Population
Visible minority group Source:^{[1]}	South Asian	15	0.2%
Visible minority group Source:^{[1]}	Chinese	0	0%
Visible minority group Source:^{[1]}	Black	15	0.2%
Visible minority group Source:^{[1]}	Filipino	10	0.2%
Visible minority group Source:^{[1]}	Arab	0	0%
Visible minority group Source:^{[1]}	Other visible minority	15	0.2%
Visible minority group Source:^{[1]}	Total visible minority population	60	0.9%
Aboriginal group Source:^{[1]}	First Nations	2,510	37.9%
Aboriginal group Source:^{[1]}	Métis	60	0.6%
Aboriginal group Source:^{[1]}	Inuit	25	0.4%
Total Aboriginal population		2,550	38.5%
White		4,010	60.5%
Total population		6,623	100%

== Arts and entertainment ==
There are numerous bars and pubs operating in Stephenville. The nightlife caters to a diverse population including students attending both College of the North Atlantic and Western College in town. Live entertainment can be found most nights of the week in at least one location. On weekends, DJs are in house at several nightclubs which have also played host to upcoming DJs and performers from cities such as Montreal and Toronto, while other locations host well-known local performers.

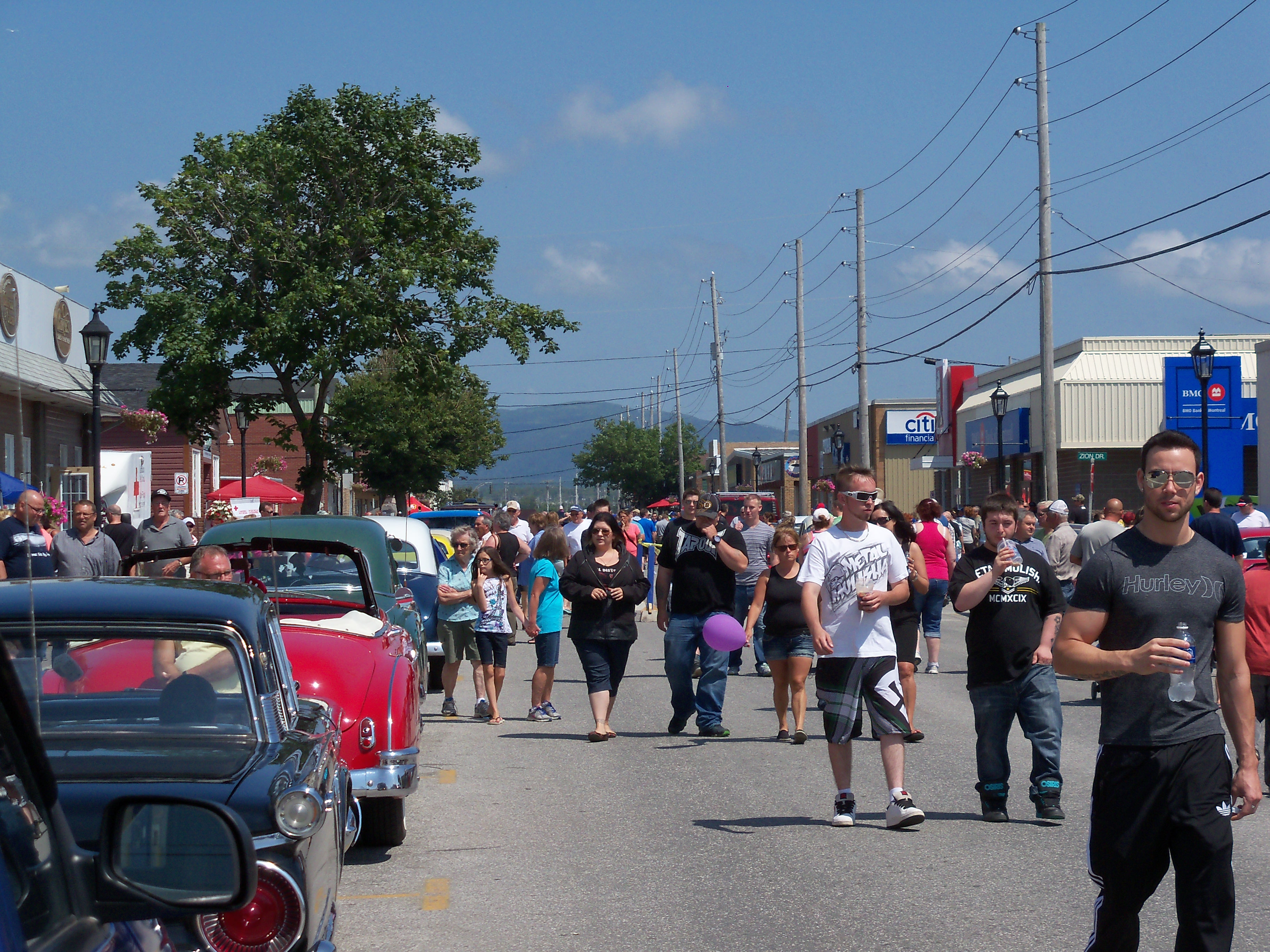
Photo of the downtown Stephenville, Newfoundland and Labrador, during the Joe MacNeil Antique and Unique Car Show in July, 2014.

The Bay St. George Folk Arts Council hosts a monthly "Folk Night" at Emile's Pub in downtown Stephenville. The Council promotes local folk artists who work in both the visual arts and in music.

Each summer, the Stephenville Theatre Festival produces high quality professional productions that have attracted visitors from all over Canada and the United States and has been reviewed by publications such as the New York Times. The festival employs upwards of 70 people and is the premiere tourist attraction for the island's southwest coast. The festival performs at the Stephenville Arts and Culture Centre, the second largest of the six arts centres throughout the province. The centre contains a 435-seat main theatre, a 142-seat secondary theatre and an art exhibition area in a building that was once The Service Club on the Ernest Harmon Air Force Base.

Following in Stephenville's strong theatre history and culture, the 2nd Stage Players provide year-round theatre productions put off by locals. The troupe was started by well-known Newfoundland theatre figure Jerry Doyle, who has also initiated acting workshops for youth and adults alike.

The newly renovated Stephenville Cinema is one of only two movie theatres remaining on the west coast of Newfoundland. In its heyday, it played host to the likes of Bob Hope, Mae West and Frank Sinatra. Today, it hosts big Hollywood titles.

== Sports and recreation ==
The town has numerous indoor and outdoor recreation opportunities. Various schools have public gymnasiums and there are private recreation and fitness facilities in the town and surrounding areas. Stephenville often hosts atlantic, provincial, and regional championships in sports such as curling, hockey, cross-country skiing, soccer, and more.

The International Appalachian Trail has been extended through the area, providing a continuous recreational hiking trail along the Long Range Mountains. The abandoned railway corridors of the Newfoundland Railway have also been designated the "T'railway Provincial Park", providing a level wilderness trail for bicycling and walking.

Within the town itself, the Walk-a-Ways Trail System offers takes pedestrians throughout the town, from the Base, to Port Harmon, into the downtown and to the fossil forest at its northern terminus. The trail links all of Stephenville's recreation areas and complexes including Bike lanes, several soccer fields, baseball and softball diamonds and tennis courts.

The town also has an 18-hole links golf course that was expanded from a 9-hole course in 1999. The course was originally built by the United States Air Force. The former Caribou Club on the base was converted into a 4 sheet curling rink in the 1970s; the club retains its original name: The Caribou Curling Club.

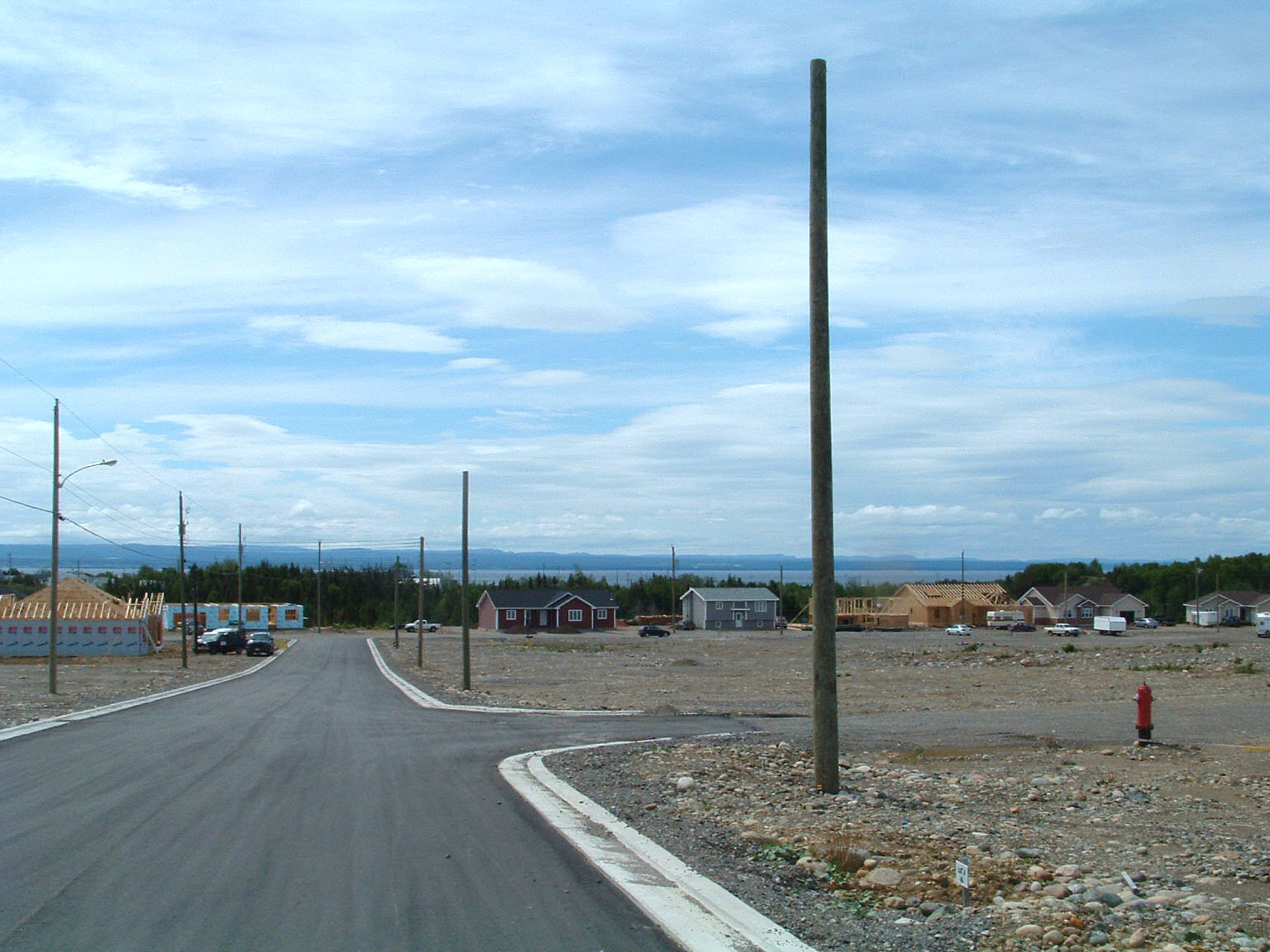
New Housing Development

The Stephenville Dome is home to the "Stephenville Lightning" hockey team of the Central West Senior Hockey league and is the main ice rink for the Bay St. George region, boasting an Olympic-size ice surface and seating for approximately 1,200 patrons. The rink plays host to hockey, figure skating, broomball, general skating, home shows, conventions and concerts. Along with the Civic Centre in Corner Brook, the Stephenville Dome co-hosted the 1999 Canada Winter Games and housed events such as figure skating and speedskating. Meanwhile, the Regional Aquatic Centre provides residents with a full range of aquatic activities. This modern swimming facility built in 1995 includes a regulation sized pool, kiddie pool, hot tub, and water slide.

In addition to privately owned fitness centres, the YMCA has a facility in Stephenville. The West Coast Training Centre, a facility featuring numerous amenities such as a gymnasium, weight room, steam room, squash courts, multi-purpose rooms, and office/meeting space was slated to be closed by provincial government as a cost-cutting measure in 2013. The town assumed ownership of the facility shortly afterward and reached an operation agreement with the YMCA. The organization operates a renovated, modern facility with space for sports such as basketball, volleyball, martial arts, as well as fitness classes and include workout space.

== Notable people ==
- Bananasaurus Rex - Twitch streamer and speedrunner
- Jason Benoit - country music singer/songwriter
- Jacinta Cormier - musician and actress (Life Classes)
- Jeff Hunt - Owner of the CFL's Ottawa RedBlacks and OHL's Ottawa 67's
- Kevin Major - Noted author of works such as the novels No Man's Land and Eating Between the Lines
- Maxim Mazumdar - Actor, director, playwright, founder of Stephenville Theatre Festival
- Brian Tobin - Former Premier of Newfoundland and Labrador
- Sherry White - actress, writer and filmmaker
- Steve Kent - Politician

== Notable events ==
- Between July 26 and August 6, 1978, Queen Elizabeth II landed at Stephenville Airport as part of a tour visiting numerous communities throughout the province.
- On July 27, 2005, Abitibi-Consolidated announced plans to cease newsprint production in Stephenville, resulting in a loss of 280 jobs to the town and surrounding region.
- On September 27, 2005, a torrential downpour caused 180 people to be evacuated, after two rivers that flow through the town overflowed their banks and flooded the town. About 140 millimetres of rain fell.
- On October 29, 2005, CBC Television announced that Stephenville had been chosen as site for the annual Hockey Day in Canada feature of Hockey Night in Canada. The event took place on January 7, 2006.
- In August 2022, Prime Minister Justin Trudeau and German Chancellor Olaf Scholz met in Stephenville to sign a green energy agreement for the construction of a zero-emission plant to produce hydrogen and ammonia for export to European markets. However, the project was never implemented. The first phase of the plan proposed building up to 164 onshore wind turbines to supply energy for the hydrogen production facility.
- In May 2026, The RCMP discovered a World War 2 Shell and ordered an evacuation order for selective neighborhoods in the town in fear that the shell will explode, and cause historic damage

== Sister city ==
- Castlegar, British Columbia

== See also ==
- List of cities and towns in Newfoundland and Labrador
- Ernest Harmon Air Force Base
- Hansen Memorial Highway
- Long Gull Pond
- Stephenville High School (Newfoundland and Labrador)
- Stephenville International Airport
