= Newfoundland Railway =

Defunct narrow-gauge railway

Coordinates: 47°33′15.85″N 52°42′47.94″W

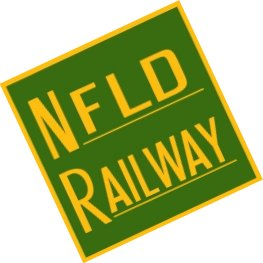
- Newfoundland Railway map

Overview
- Headquarters: St. John's, Newfoundland
- Reporting mark: NFLD
- Locale: Newfoundland
- Dates of operation: 1898–1949 (merged into CN), abandoned 1988

Technical
- Track gauge: 3 ft 6 in (1,067 mm)

The Newfoundland Railway was a narrow-gauge railway that operated on the island of Newfoundland from 1898 to 1988. With a total track length of 906 miles (1,458 km), it was the longest 3 ft 6 in (1,067 mm) narrow-gauge system in North America.

== History ==
=== Early construction ===
In 1880, a committee of the Newfoundland Legislature recommended that a narrow-gauge railway be built from the colonial capital in St. John's to Halls Bay, 547 km (340 mi) to the west. Construction was started on the Avalon Peninsula in August 1881 by the Blackman Syndicate. By 1884, the Newfoundland Railway Company had built 92 km (57 mi) west to Whitbourne before going into receivership.

The bondholders of the bankrupt Newfoundland Railway Company continued to build a 43 km (27 mi) branch line from Brigus Junction to Harbour Grace (the Harbour Grace Railway), which was completed by November that year.

The colonial government undertook to build a branch from the junction at Whitbourne to the port of Placentia between 1886 and 1888.

=== Robert G. Reid ===
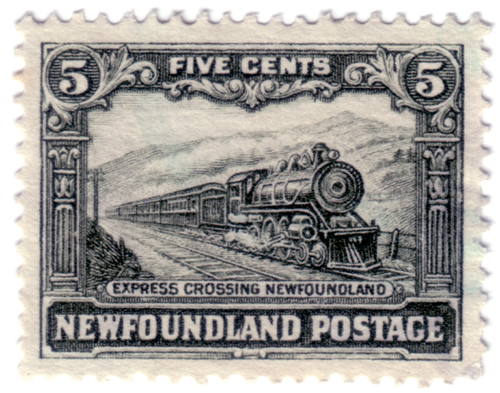
Newfoundland Railway stamp

The colonial government sought new investors to continue the stalled project to Halls Bay and in June 1890, Scottish-born Montreal resident and railway engineer/contractor Robert Gillespie Reid agreed to build and operate the line. By 1892, Reid's workers were approaching the halfway point at the Exploits River when the government changed the terminus from Halls Bay approximately 400 km (250 mi) further west, first to St. George's and finally to Port aux Basques. The route itself was diverted inland up the Exploits valley and over the Gaff Topsails (some of the highest elevation terrain on the island) and away from the coast once on the north bank of the Exploits River. This extension to the system was initially operated as the Newfoundland Northern and Western Railway and for it, Reid was granted land totalling 5,000 acres per mile (13 km^{2}/km).

The new line west to Port aux Basques was completed between 1894 and 1898. At the same time, Reid proposed a ferry service across the Cabot Strait from Port aux Basques to North Sydney, Nova Scotia, and contracted for a steamship to be built in Scotland. The Bruce arrived in the fall of 1897, before the line was completed to Port aux Basques, so her initial runs to Cape Breton Island were made from Little Placentia Sound. On June 29, 1898, the first passenger train arrived at Port aux Basques and the Bruce set sail with passengers for North Sydney.

Later that year, the colonial government persuaded Reid's company to take over operation of the bankrupt Newfoundland Railway Company and its sister Harbour Grace Railway, as well as the government-owned Placentia branch, in order to unify the system across the entire island (known as the Railway Contract of '98). The Reid company agreed to operate the lines for 50 years, in exchange for outright ownership and land grants. They also purchased the government drydock in St. John's and the telegraph system. The Reid company purchased eight new steamships to operate as coastal ferries around the island and into Labrador.

Controversy followed the awarding of so many assets to Reid, and in 1901 the contracts were modified to place everything under a limited liability corporation, named the Reid Newfoundland Company.

Reid's railway development in the colony began to attract attention to the potential of the island's natural resources. In 1903, the Reids partnered with a St. John's businessman, Harry J. Crowe, to purchase timber rights in Botwood, Norris Arm, Gambo, Gander Bay, and Point Leamington. In 1904, British investors named Harmsworth declared their intention to build a pulp and paper mill in Grand Falls and on January 7, 1905, the Anglo Newfoundland Development Company (AND) was formed, based on a partnership between the Harmsworths, Reid and the colonial government. Botwood was expanded through the construction of deepwater wharves and warehouses for shipping the finished pulp. To link the two, AND built the narrow gauge Botwood Railway (built to the same gauge as the Reid Newfoundland Company trackage) beginning in 1908 and completing it in 1909. It would later be renamed the Grand Falls Central Railway.

Reid died in 1908 but his company set the pace for development in Newfoundland's interior mining and forestry industries, although the entire operation continued to suffer losses. In 1909 and into the 1910s, the colonial government contracted for additional branch lines to be built. Some of the major works included:

- a line to Bonavista
- a line to Trepassey
- extend the Harbour Grace line through Carbonear to Bay de Verde
- several smaller branches, some of which were graded but rails were never installed

=== Nationalization ===
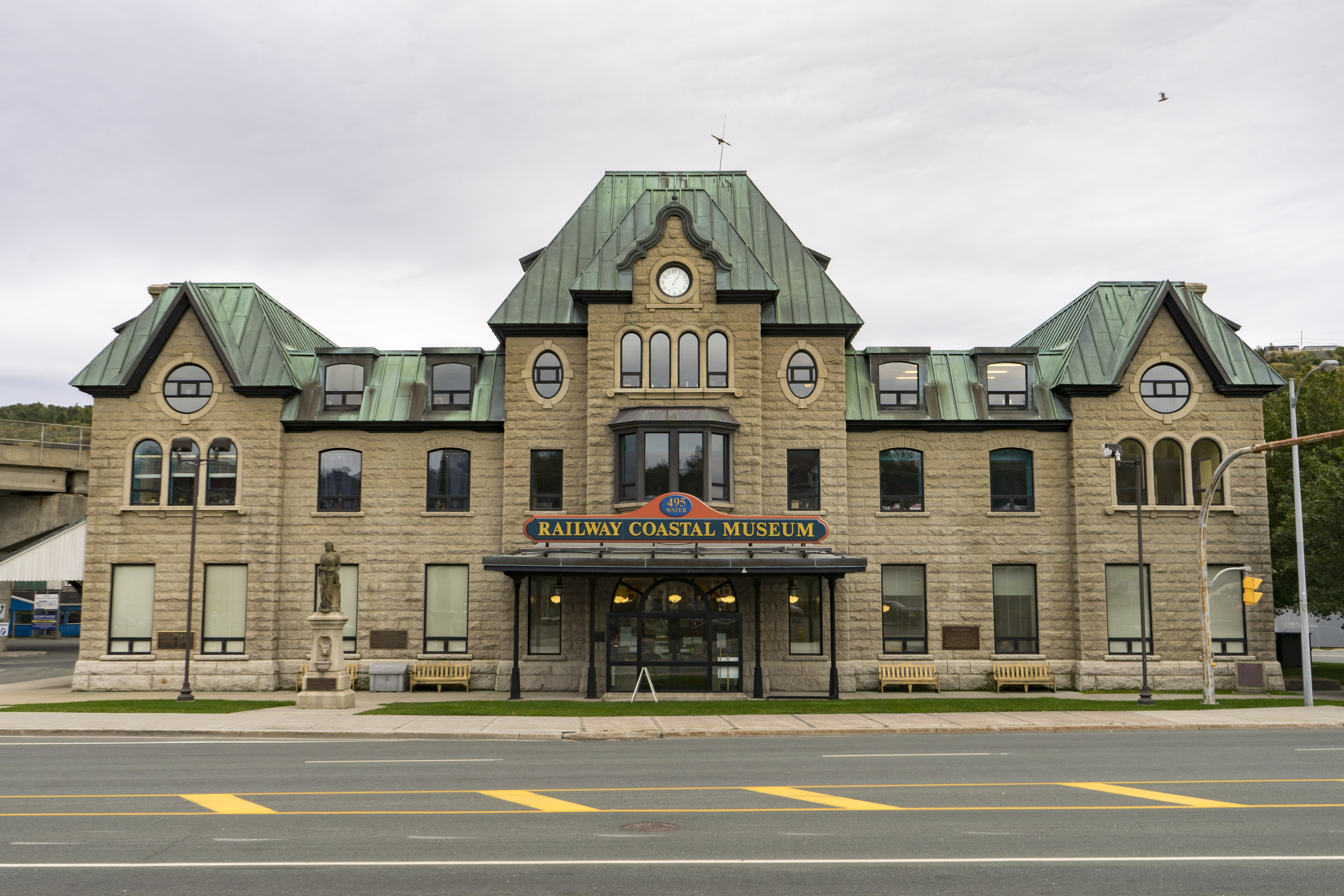
Newfoundland Railway Station, St. John's

By the early 1920s, the Reid Newfoundland Company's losses were mounting and in 1923 the colonial government passed the Railway Settlement Act which cancelled the operating contract for the entire system, passing the railway into government control (a form of nationalization). Some of the lands that had belonged to the Reid Newfoundland Company were used by the government as part of a deal to develop a pulp and paper mill in Corner Brook.

The railway was initially called the Newfoundland Government Railway but was soon shortened to the Newfoundland Railway in 1926. It remained the property of the dominion government until Confederation on March 31, 1949, when it was transferred to the federal government's Canadian National Railway.

In 1925, the American Smelting and Refining Company (ASARCO) perfected a method for recovering individual metals in ore and entered into partnership with AND to develop a mine at Buchans, which was connected to the Newfoundland Railway by the Millertown Railway, also a 3 ft 6 in (1,067 mm) narrow gauge.

=== Wartime ===
Although the railway saw an increase in traffic during the First World War, it was extensive military-related construction in the late 1930s and early 1940s which proved the worth of the Newfoundland Railway as a strategic asset. An air force base was developed adjacent to the main line in Gander, and major American military bases were constructed in Stephenville (Ernest Harmon AFB), Argentia (NS Argentia) and St. John's (Pepperrell AFB), in addition to Canadian and British defence facilities in St. John's. Given the lack of roads and all-weather highways in Newfoundland during the 1940s, and the U-boat threat in the waters off-shore, the Newfoundland Railway became a vital, yet very obscure, supply link in the defence of the Northeast Atlantic and the Allied convoy system.

When Winston Churchill met Franklin D. Roosevelt in Placentia Bay in 1941 to sign the Atlantic Charter, Churchill sent for Lord Beaverbrook, Minister of Aircraft Production. Beaverbrook flew into Gander and then travelled by rail to Placentia in the caboose of a freight train to save waiting for a passenger train.

In 1943, a joint project between AT&T and the United States Army established strategic landline telephone service along the railway right-of-way.

The Second World War also saw the Newfoundland Railway experience its most tragic loss, when the ferry Caribou was torpedoed and sunk 40 km (25 miles) off Port aux Basques by the German submarine U-69 on October 14, 1942. 137 passengers died and 104 people survived the sinking. In honour of the lost passengers and crew, the Newfoundland Railway Employees Association had the entire workforce forego a day's wages as a donation to a public campaign to build a memorial near the Port aux Basques railway terminal.

=== Canadian National ===
Newfoundland became the 10th province of Canada on March 31, 1949, and the Newfoundland Railway's assets were transferred to the control of the federal Crown corporation Canadian National Railway (CNR, CN post-1960). CN became a major presence in Newfoundland's early years as a province, controlling the railway, dry dock services, many ferries and coastal boats, and the telegraph system.

The Newfoundland Railway's premiere cross-island passenger train, The Overland Limited was renamed the Caribou by CN, although it was known colloquially as The Newfie Bullet. CN maintained the Caribou until 1969.

CN made major capital improvements, upgrading the main line, bridges, and rolling stock, and replacing steam locomotives with diesel units. Additional improvements were made to the ferry service, with new vessels and an expanded terminal at Port aux Basques. An additional indirect service improvement to the Newfoundland railway operations was made in 1955, with the opening of the Canso Causeway, linking Cape Breton Island with mainland North America and removing the need to ferry railcars destined for Newfoundland across the Strait of Canso.

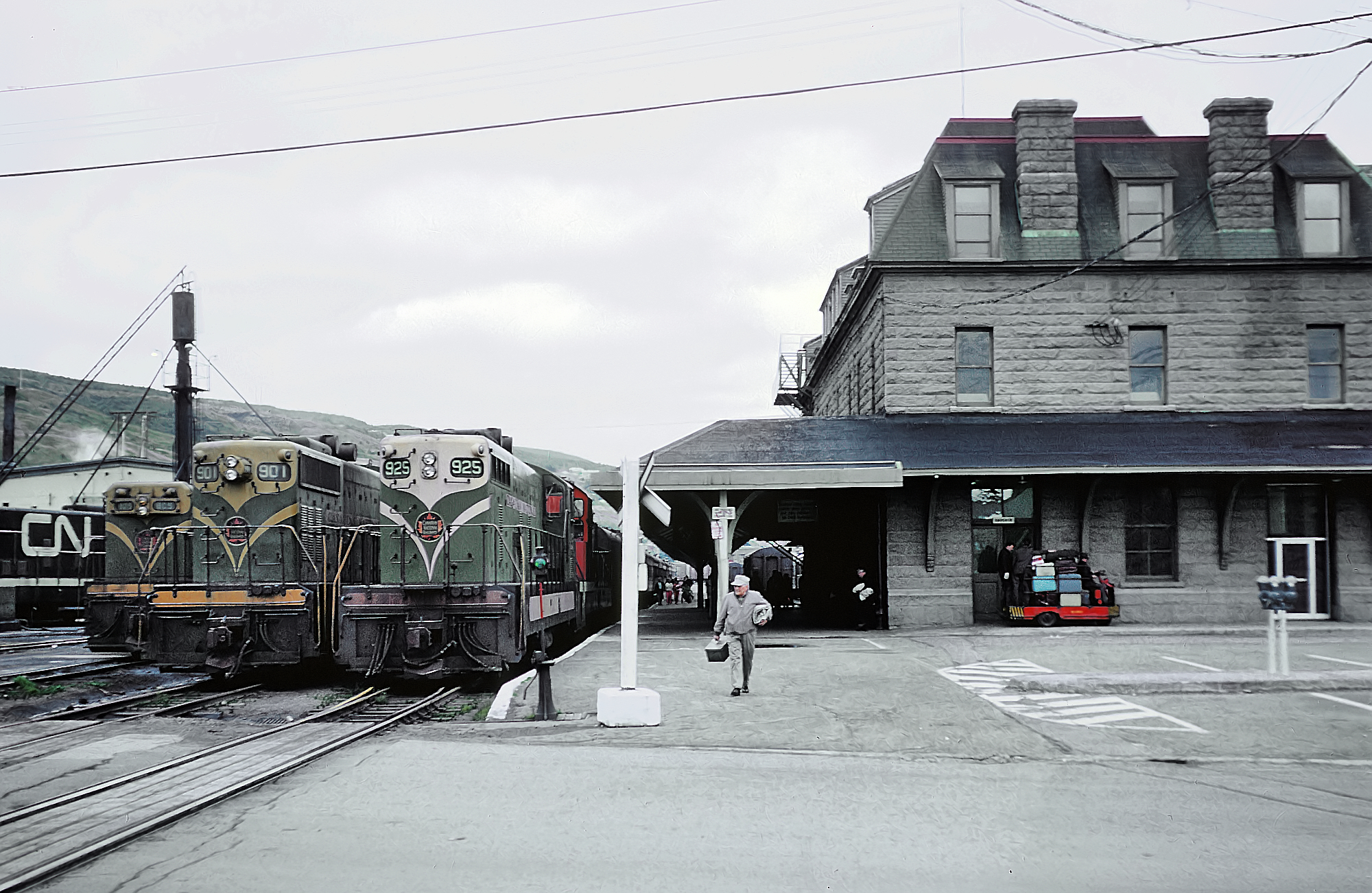
CN trains at St. John's, 1968

CN's Newfoundland operations continued to see significant traffic increases with its improved ferry and rail connections, but faced increased truck and bus competition on completion of the Trans-Canada Highway across the island in 1965. New railcar-capable ferries were introduced; mainland standard-gauge railcars were ferried to Newfoundland, where their standard-gauge bogies were replaced with narrow-gauge bogies in Port aux Basques. This innovation was unsuccessful. The first casualty was the passenger rail service, which was abandoned in 1969 in favour of buses. CN began to essentially stop marketing its own Newfoundland rail operations through the 1970s and began to rely on trucks for hauling cargo.

In 1979, CN reorganized its narrow-gauge system into Terra Transport, as a means to separate the subsidy-dependent Newfoundland rail operations from its mainland North America core freight rail system. Rail cargo traffic continued to decline, and all branch lines on the island were closed in 1984. In 1987, Canada deregulated its railway industry, allowing abandonments to proceed with less red tape. The former CN subsidiary CN Marine was reorganized into Marine Atlantic in 1986 and one of the two railcar ferries was sold off, leaving the narrow-gauge system with limited interchange ability at Port aux Basques in its final two years. In December 1987 the provincial and federal governments signed a deal worth $800 million for highway improvements, removing the provincial government's opposition to the pending abandonment of the railway.

The railway was officially abandoned on October 1, 1988. Following abandonment, work trains continued to operate, assisting salvage crews to remove the rails from remote locations, particularly in the Gaff Topsails between the Exploits River and Deer Lake. The last train, prior to work trains removing rails, arrived from Port Aux Basques and departed Corner Brook eastbound on September 30 and arrived at Bishops Falls on the morning of October 1.

CN continued to operate its Roadcruiser Bus service and a CN Intermodal trucking operation in Newfoundland until 1996. With CN's privatization in late 1995, the company divested itself of all money-losing and most non-railroad interests, including CN Roadcruiser. Cross-island bus service was taken over by DRL Coachlines of Triton, Newfoundland on March 30, 1996. The CN Newfoundland trucking operation continued until fall 1996, and was then contracted to Clarke Transport.

=== Legacy ===
The former Newfoundland Railway station in St. John's now hosts the Railway Coastal Museum. Numerous towns across the island have preserved railway equipment on display.

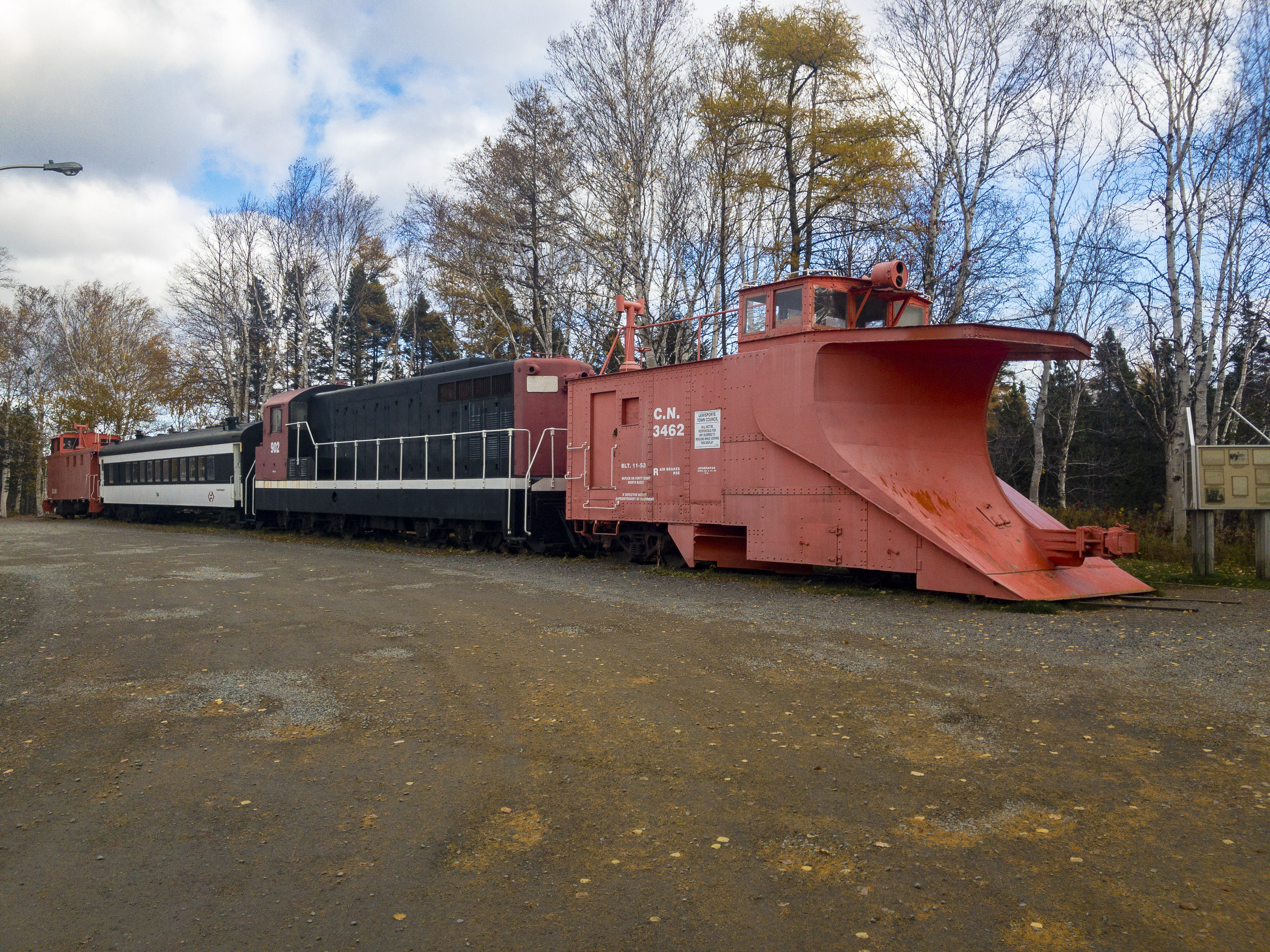
Lewisporte Train Park, Newfoundland, Canada

With few exceptions, the roadbed now forms the T'Railway Provincial Park rail trail. Until 2005, the Trinity Loop Amusement Park operated a miniature train, one of the few remaining places on Newfoundland with tracks still in place. The park closed down and was abandoned in 2005 due to lack of interest. Since then, all of the buildings have been heavily vandalized and Hurricane Igor washed away part of the park, including a large section of the rail bed. Local railway fans have been pushing government to retain the park as an historic site but officials have expressed little interest.

Several former railway stations are designated as Registered Heritage Structures by the Heritage Foundation of Newfoundland and Labrador. These include:

- Avondale Railway Station, designated 1988;
- Bay Roberts Railway Station, designated 2007;
- Carbonear Railway Station, designated 1987;
- Clarenville Railway Station, designated 2014;
- Harbour Grace Railway Station, designated 2016;
- Western Bay Railway Station, designated 1994.

Some rolling stock was converted to a narrower gauge of 914 mm (3 ft) and sold to the White Pass & Yukon Route (WP&YR) railway, which reopened for service in 1988. Gravel cars used by WP&YR are still painted in CN orange.

The province of Newfoundland and Labrador still has railway transportation, operating on mainland Labrador. The Quebec, North Shore & Labrador Railway (QNSL) operates between Sept-Îles, Quebec, and the mining region of Labrador West. A former QNSL line, now owned and operated by Tshiuetin Rail Transportation, serves the former mining town of Schefferville, Quebec, passing through Labrador. QNSL also connects with Newfoundland and Labrador's other active railway, the Wabush Lake Railway.

== Harbour Grace Railway ==
Image	Number	Builder	Type	Date	Works number	Notes
	1	Hawthorn Leslie and Company	0-6-0T	1881	1884	Harbour Grace Railway No. 1 owned by the Reid Newfoundland company for a short bit and sold again in 1898 to the Botwood Railway Renumbered no. 7, found buried in the 70s is now on display at the Demasdult Regional Museum
	2–6	Hunslet Engine Company	4-4-0T	1872	85–89	Harbour Grace Railway No. 2–6 purchased from Prince Edward Island Railway in 1881. Group may also have included one or more unaccounted locomotives from the New Brunswick Railway – scrapped 1889–1893
	7-9	Hawthorn Leslie and Company	2-6-0	1882	1885–1887	no. 8, named St.Johns. Sold to the Reid Newfoundland Company and Renumberd 20–22, scrapped in 1924
	1/10	Hawthorn Leslie and Company	2-6-0	1882	1888	Scrapped 1887
	2/10	Hawthorn Leslie and Company	2-6-2	1888	2061	Sold to the Reid Newfoundland Company and Renumberd 23, scrapped
	11	Hawthorn Leslie and Company	2-6-0	1882	1889	Scrapped 1894
	12	Baldwin Locomotive Works	2-6-0	1877	4211	no. 12 Reported as ex N.B.R. no. 9; other sources suggest it is N.B.R. no. 10 – scrapped

== (Placentia Railway) 1886-1890, (Halls Bay Railroad) 1890-1894, Newfoundland Northern and Western Railway 1894-1898 ==
Image	Number	Builder	Type	Date	Works number	Notes
	1	Hunslet Engine Company	0-6-0T	6/1882	284	J.C. Wilson; sold too the Placentia Railway as No. 1 – Scrapped 1898
	2	Baldwin Locomotive Works	4-4-0	7/1889	10135	too the Reid Newfoundland Company and Renumberd to 43 – sold in 1918 to the Botwood Railway Renumbered to 8– Scrapped 1946
	3	Baldwin Locomotive Works	4-4-0	5/1891	11851	Named Sir William D. Whiteway. too the Reid Newfoundland Company and Renumberd to 41– Scrapped
	4	Baldwin Locomotive Works	2-6-0	5/1891	11859	too the Reid Newfoundland Company and Renumberd to 60– Scrapped 1930. Image shows it was invalved in a wreck at an unknown location
	5	Baldwin Locomotive Works	4-4-0	7/1891	12100	too the Reid Newfoundland Company and Renumberd to 42– Scrapped
	6	Baldwin Locomotive Works	2-6-0	6/1893	13519	too the Reid Newfoundland Company and Renumberd to 61 – Scrapped
	7	Baldwin Locomotive Works	4-4-0	6/1893	13518	too the Reid Newfoundland Company and Renumberd to 40 – Scrapped
	8	Baldwin Locomotive Works	2-4-2T	7/1893	13566	too the Reid Newfoundland Company No. 8, – Scrapped 1925
	9	Baldwin Locomotive Works	2-4-2T	7/1893	13567	too the Reid Newfoundland Company No. 9, – Scrapped 1934
	10	Baldwin Locomotive Works	2-4-2T	3/1894	13968	too the Reid Newfoundland Company No. 10, Then sold to the International Power & Paper and Renumberd to 1, – Scrapped
	11	Baldwin Locomotive Works	2-6-0	3/1894	13976	too the Reid Newfoundland Company and Renumberd to 62– Scrapped
	12	Baldwin Locomotive Works	4-6-0	4/1897	15308	Named Sir Herbert Murray. too the Reid Newfoundland Company and Renumberd to 105 (1st) – Scrapped
	13	Baldwin Locomotive Works	4-6-0	4/1897	15309	Named Hon. Robert Bond. too the Reid Newfoundland Company and Renumberd to 102– Scrapped

== Reid Newfoundland Company/Railway ==
Image	Number	Builder	Type	Date	Works number	Notes
	100	Baldwin Locomotive Works	4-6-0	10/1898	16244	reports say its from the New Brunswick railway. to the Newfoundland Railway Renumbered No. 1 in 1925 and assigned as the St.John's shunter – Scrapped 6/1939
	101	Baldwin Locomotive Works	4-6-0	10/1898	16245	Scrapped
	103	Baldwin Locomotive Works	4-6-0	10/1898	16271	Reportedly from the New Brunswick Railway – Scrapped
	104	Baldwin Locomotive Works	4-6-0	10/1898	16272	Scrapped
	105	Baldwin Locomotive works	4-6-0	2/1900	17510	from the New Brunswick Railway no. 105 (2nd) Renumberd to 125in 1918 – Scrapped in 1939
	106	Baldwin Locomotive Works	4-6-0	2/1900	17511	Scrapped
	107	Baldwin Locomotive Works	4-6-0	6/1900	17832	to the Newfoundland Railway – Scrapped in 1939
	108	Baldwin Locomotive Works	4-6-0	6/1900	17837	Scrapped
	109	Baldwin Locomotive Works	4-6-0	1/1908	32576	to the Newfoundland Railway – Scrapped in 1939
	110	Baldwin Locomotive Works	4-6-0	1/1908	32577	to the Newfoundland Railway – Scrapped in 1939
	111	Reid-Newfoundland Company Shops	4-6-0	1911	1	Scrapped
	112	Reid-Newfoundland Company Shops	4-6-0	1911	2	to the Newfoundland Railway – Scrapped in 1945
	113	Reid-Newfoundland Company Shops	4-6-0	1912	3	to the Newfoundland Railway, to the CNR in 1949 as CNR class F-3-a No. 15 Image of the lococomotive on a dead line in 1948 – Scrapped 12/1951 before it received it's number
	114	Reid-Newfoundland Company Shops	4-6-0	1912	4	to the Newfoundland Railway, to the CNR in 1949 as CNR class F-3-a No. 16 Image of it on a dead line in 1948 – Scrapped 12/1951 before it received it's number
	115	Reid-Newfoundland Company Shops	4-6-0	1913	5	to the Newfoundland Railway – Scrapped in 1938
	116	Reid-Newfoundland Company Shops	4-6-0	1913	6	to the Newfoundland Railway – Scrapped in 1938
	117	Reid-Newfoundland Company Shops	4-6-0	1914	7	to the Newfoundland Railway, to the CNR in 1949 Renumbered, CNR class F-3-a No. 17 – Scrapped 7/1953 before it received its number
	118	Reid-Newfoundland Company Shops	4-6-0	1914	8	to the Newfoundland Railway – Scrapped in 1938
	119	Reid-Newfoundland Company Shops	4-6-0	1915	9	to the Newfoundland Railway – Scrapped in 1940
	120	Reid-Newfoundland Company Shops	4-6-0	1915	10	to the Newfoundland Railway – Scrapped in 1938
	121	Baldwin Locomotive Works	4-6-0	10/1917	46636	to the Newfoundland Railway – Scrapped in 1938
	122	Baldwin Locomotive Works	4-6-0	10/1917	46637	to the Newfoundland Railway then too the CNR in 1949 Renumbered, CNR class F-3-a No. 18 – Scrapped 7/1953 before it received its number
	123	Baldwin Locomotive Works	4-6-0	10/1917	46638	to the Newfoundland Railway – Scrapped in 1939.
	124	Baldwin Locomotive Works	4-6-0	10/1917	46691	to the Newfoundland Railway then too CNR in 1949 Renumbered, CNR class F-3-a Scrapped 7/1953 before it received its number
	150	Baldwin Locomotive Works	2-8-0	2/1903	21597	to the Newfoundland Railway – Scrapped in 1940
	151	Baldwin Locomotive Works	2-8-0	2/1903	21598	to the Newfoundland Railway then to CNR in 1949 – Scrapped in 1955
	152	Reid-Newfoundland Company Shops	2-8-0	1916	11	to the Newfoundland Railway then to CNR in 1949 Renumbered, CNR class L-5-a No. 280 Image of the locomotive in a dead line in 1953 – Scrapped 4/1955
	153	Reid-Newfoundland Company Shops	2-8-0	1916	12	to the Newfoundland Railway – Scrapped in 1947
	190	Baldwin Locomotive Works	4-6-2	1921	54398	to the Newfoundland Railway then to CNR in 1949 Renumbered, CNR class J-8-a No. 590– – Scrapped on the 4/1957
	191	Baldwin Locomotive works	4-6-2	1921	54399	to the Newfoundland Railway then to CNR in 1949 Renumbered, CNR class J-8-a No. 591– – Scrapped on the 4/1957
	192	Baldwin Locomotive works	4-6-2	1921	54400	to the Newfoundland Railway then to CNR in 1949 Renumbered, CNR class J-8-a No. 592– – Scrapped on the 4/1957
	193	Baldwin Locomotive works	4-6-2	1921	54401	to the Newfoundland Railway then to CNR in 1949 Renumbered, CNR class J-8-a No. 593– – is preserved
	194	Baldwin Locomotive works	4-6-2	1921	54466	to the Newfoundland Railway then to CNR in 1949 Renumbered, CNR class J-8-a No. 594– – Scrapped on the 8/1958
	195	Baldwin Locomotive works	4-6-2	1921	54467	to the Newfoundland Railway then to CNR in 1949 Renumbered, CNR class J-8-a No. 595– – Scrapped on the 4/1957

== Newfoundland Railway ==
Image	Number	Builder	Type	Date	Works number	Notes
	196	Baldwin Locomotive Works	4-6-2	1926	59531	To CNR as class J-8-b No. 596 – Scrapped 3/1957
	197	Montreal Locomotive Works	4-6-2	1926	67129	To CNR as class J-8-b No. 597 – Scrapped 4/1957
	198	American Locomotive Company	4-6-2	1929	67941	To CNR as class J-8-c No. 598 – Scrapped 3/1957
	199	American Locomotive Company	4-6-2	1929	67942	To CNR as class J-8-c No. 599 – Scrapped 3/1957
	1000	American Locomotive Company	2-8-2	1930	68400	To CNR as class R-2-a No. 300 – Scrapped 6/1957
	1001	American Locomotive Company	2-8-2	1930	68401	To CNR as class R-2-a No. 301 – Scrapped 3/1957
	1002	North British Locomotive Company	2-8-2	1935	24297	To CNR as class R-2-b No. 302 – Scrapped 5/1957
	1003	North British Locomotive Company	2-8-2	1935	24298	To CNR as class R-2-b No. 303 – Scrapped 9/1957
	1004	North British Locomotive Company	2-8-2	1937	24436	To CNR as class R-2-b No. 304 – Scrapped 3/1957
	1005	North British Locomotive Company	2-8-2	1938	24521	To CNR as class R-2-b No. 305 – Scrapped 11/1957
	1006	North British Locomotive Company	2-8-2	1938	24522	To CNR as class R-2-b No. 306 – Scrapped 3/1957
	1007	Montreal Locomotive Works	2-8-2	1941	24667	To CNR as class R-2-c No. 308 Only this unit and 1008 did not keep their same last digits when renumbered by CN into the 300 series. Possibly done to keep MLW/ALCo units in one class and North British built units in another class – Scrapped 4/1957
	1008	North British Locomotive Company	2-8-2	1941	69444	To CNR as class R-2-b No. 307 Only this unit and 1007 did not keep their same last digits when renumbered by CN into the 300 series. Possibly done to keep MLW/ALCo units in one class and North British built units in another class – Scrapped 5/1957
	1009	American Locomotive Company	2-8-2	1941	69736	To CNR as class R-2-c No. 309 – Scrapped 5/1957
	1010	American Locomotive Company	2-8-2	1941	69737	To CNR as class R-2-c No. 310 – Scrapped 5/1957
	1011	American Locomotive Company	2-8-2	1941	69738	To CNR as class R-2-c No. 311 – Scrapped 5/1957
	1012	American Locomotive Company	2-8-2	1941	69739	To CNR as class R-2-c No. 312 – Scrapped 5/1957
	1013	American Locomotive Company	2-8-2	1941	69740	To CNR as class R-2-c No. 313 – Scrapped 6/1957
	1014	Montreal Locomotive Works	2-8-2	1941	69695	To CNR as class R-2-c No. 314 – Scrapped 11/1957
	1015	Montreal Locomotive Works	2-8-2	1941	69696	To CNR as class R-2-c No. 315 – Scrapped 11/1957
	1016	American Locomotive Company	2-8-2	1944	71963	To CNR as class R-2-c No. 316 – Scrapped 8/1957
	1017	American Locomotive Company	2-8-2	1944	71964	To CNR as class R-2-c No. 317 – Scrapped 7/1957
	1018	American Locomotive Company	2-8-2	1944	71965	To CNR as class R-2-c No. 318 – Scrapped 7/1957
	1019	American Locomotive Company	2-8-2	1944	71966	To CNR as class R-2-c No. 319 – Scrapped 9/1957
	1020	Montreal Locomotive Works	2-8-2	1947	75635	To CNR as class R-2-d No. 320 – Scrapped 7/1957
	1021	Montreal Locomotive Works	2-8-2	1947	75636	To CNR as class R-2-d No. 321 – Scrapped 11/1957
	1022	Montreal Locomotive Works	2-8-2	1947	75637	To CNR as class R-2-d No. 322 – Scrapped 10/1957
	1023	Montreal Locomotive Works	2-8-2	1947	75638	To CNR as class R-2-d No. 323 – Scrapped 7/1957
	1024	Montreal Locomotive Works	2-8-2	1949	76333	To CNR as class R-2-d No. 324 – Scrapped 8/1957
	1025	Montreal Locomotive Works	2-8-2	1949	76424	To CNR as class R-2-d No. 325 – Scrapped 9/1957
	1026	Montreal Locomotive Works	2-8-2	1949	76425	To CNR as class R-2-d No. 326 – Scrapped 8/1957
	1027	Montreal Locomotive Works	2-8-2	1949	76426	To CNR as class R-2-d No. 327 – Scrapped 4/1957
	1028	Montreal Locomotive Works	2-8-2	1949	76427	To CNR as class R-2-d No. 328 – Scrapped 12/1957
	1029	Montreal Locomotive Works	2-8-2	1949	76428	To CNR as class R-2-d No. 329 – Scrapped 11/1957
	5000	General Electric	B+B	1948	29722	Narrow gauge version of GE 47-ton switcher. To CNR as class ES-4-a No. 775 – sold 1968 to Northern Railway of Costa Rica
	5001	General Electric	B+B	1948	29723	Narrow gauge version of GE 47-ton switcher. To CNR as class ES-4-a No. 776 – sold 1968 to Northern Railway of Costa Rica
	5002	General Electric	B+B	1948	29724	Narrow gauge version of GE 47-ton switcher. To CNR as class ES-4-a No. 777 – sold 1968 to Northern Railway of Costa Rica

== Canadian National ==
Image	Number	Builder	Type	Date	Works number	Notes
	800–805	General Motors Diesel	A1A-A1A	1956	A923–A928	GMD G8. CNR class GR-9-b two Preserved 803 Preserved in carbonear and 805 is Preserved at the Canadian Railway Museum Quebec
	900–902	General Motors Diesel	C-C	1952	A303–305	GMD NF110. CNR class Y-4-a then GR-12-a two Preserved 900 the first Built on display at the Clarenville Heritage museum and 902 on display at the lewisporte train park
	903–908	General Motors Diesel	C-C	1953	A435–A440	GMD NF110. CNR class Y-4-b then GR-12-b one preserved 906 is on display at the Railway Coastal Museum
	909–934	General Motors Diesel	C-C	1956	A897–A922	GMD NF210. 931 and 932 derailed in Gander on January 15, 1984 CNR class GR-12-g; Nos. 912 & 920 wrecked 9/1966, Nos. 910, 911, 915, 916, 918, 921, 926, 928 & 929 sold to FCAB, Chile, No. 933 sold to Sociedad Química y Minera, Chile. Preserved 924, 925, 931, 932, 934,
	935–937	General Motors Diesel	C-C	1958	A1450–A1452	GMD NF210. CNR class GR-12-p; No. 936 sold 1988 to FCAB, Chile, No. 937 sold to SQM, 1989 passed to FCAB
	938-946	General Motors Diesel	C-C	1960	A1834-A1842	GMD NF210. CNR class GR-12-x all, except for one, were sold to FCP and passed 1994 to FCAB, Chile one 940 is preserved.

In addition, the Steam Rail Coaches A, B, C, D and E were built between 1923 and 1925 by Sentinel-Cammell for the Newfoundland Railway for service between Humbermouth and Curling West, St. John's and Topsail, and also on branch lines. Although successful in Britain, the type proved inadequate in the rugged winter weather of Newfoundland. Also, the necessity for a crew of three (engineer, fireman and conductor) meant that cost savings were not as great as expected. All were scrapped in 1938–1939 after the closure of the Bay de Verde, Heart's Content and Trepassy branches.

== See also ==
- Bogie exchange
- Newfoundland T'Railway
- Terra Transport
- Sakhalin Railway: Used Cape gauge until 2019, when conversion to Russian gauge was complete
- List of stock used by Ferrocarril de Antofagasta a Bolivia
