= Lewis Hills =

Mountain range in western Newfoundland, Canada

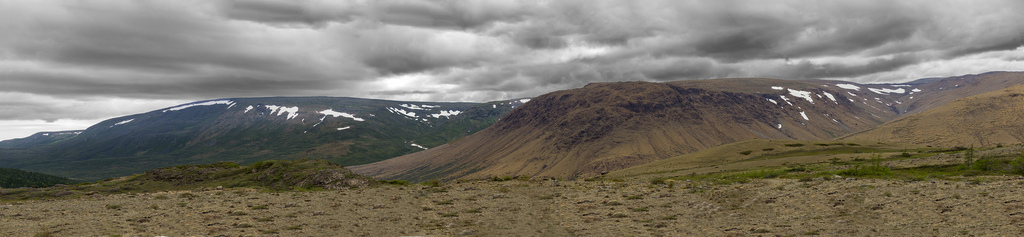
- Fox Island River Valley in Lewis Hills

Highest point
- Peak: The Cabox
- Elevation: 814 m (2,671 ft)
- Coordinates: 48°49′59″N 58°29′03″W

Geography
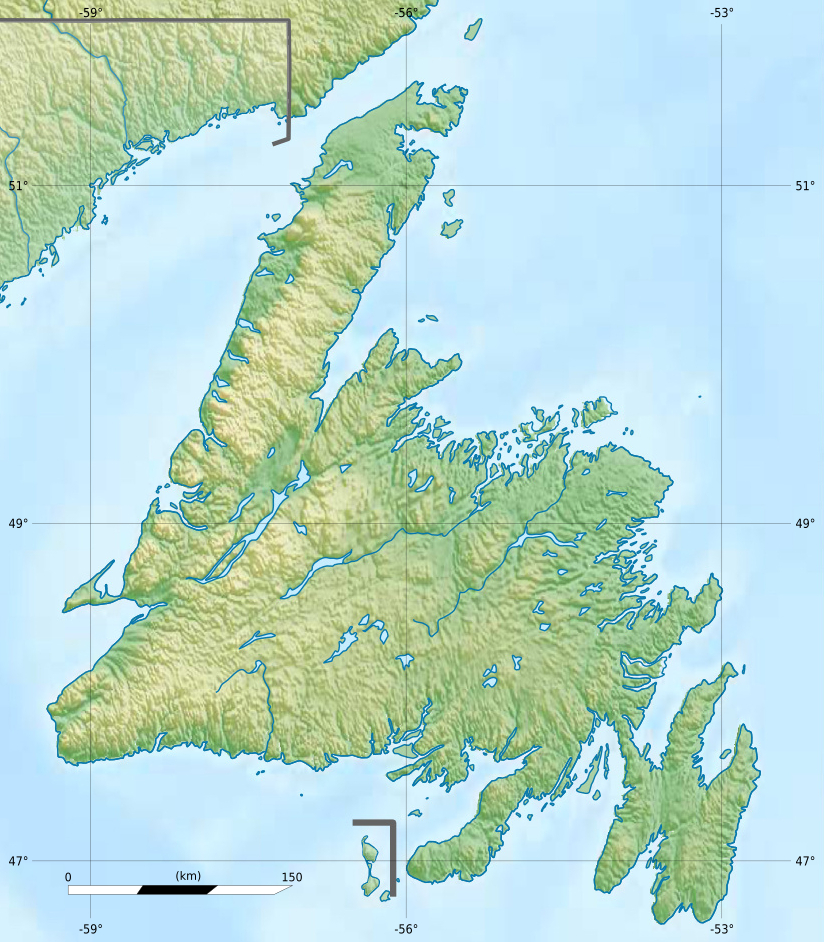
- Location within Newfoundland
- Country: Canada
- Province: Newfoundland and Labrador
- Range coordinates: 48°47.9′N 58°30.4′W
- Parent range: Appalachian Mountains, Long Range Mountains

The Lewis Hills are a section of the Long Range Mountains located on the west coast of Newfoundland, along the Gulf of Saint Lawrence.

An ophiolite and Peridotite complex, the Lewis Hills are the southernmost of four such complexes located within the Humber Arm Allochthon, a world-renowned geological area. They are located in an area stretching between the town of Stephenville in the south and the city of Corner Brook in the north.

The Lewis Hills are an excellent backcountry wilderness hiking destination. The most accessible day-hiking route to the Lewis Hills is by the International Appalachian Trail, with the southern trail head located almost at the end of Cold Brook Road, and the northern trail head at the end of Logger School Road.

At 814 m (2,671 ft) above sea level, the highest elevation on Newfoundland is The Cabox located in the Lewis Hills at 48°49′59″N 58°29′03″W.
