= Stephenville High School (Newfoundland and Labrador) =

Location
- Bruce Boulevard; Stephenville, Newfoundland and Labrador, A2N 3M6; Canada; 48.5533°N 58.5976°W

Information
- School type: High school
- Motto: Home of the Spartans
- Founded: 1998
- School board: Newfoundland and Labrador English School District
- Principal: Mark Burt
- Grades: 9-L4
- Enrolment: 390
- Language: English
- Area: Stephenville
- Colours: Red, White, and Black
- Team name: Spartans
- Website: stephenvillehigh.nlesd.ca

Stephenville High School (commonly abbreviated SHS) is one of two high schools serving northern Bay St. George and Port au Port, in Newfoundland and Labrador, Canada. More specifically, the school serves grade 9-12 students from Stephenville, Stephenville Crossing, Noel's Pond, Cold Brook, Kippens, Romaines, Port-au-Port East, Port-au-Port West, Point au Mal and Fox Island River.

== Athletics ==
The school has been named 4A School of the Year for Newfoundland and Labrador in each of the last four years, as well as five of the last six.

Sports teams for SHS include:

Boys Ice Hockey, Girls Ice Hockey, Boys Ball Hockey, Girls Ball Hockey, Senior Boys Basketball, Junior Boys Basketball, Girls Basketball, Girls Volleyball, Boys Volleyball, Track & Field, Boys Softball, Girls Softball, Badminton, Wrestling, Table Tennis, Boys Broomball, Girls Broomball, Curling, Boys Soccer, And Girls Soccer. Stephenville High's teams go by the name of Spartans, which was carried over from the former St. Stephen's High.

== School groups ==
Stephenville High School has a number of active clubs and groups. In the fall of 2007, the school held its first annual Fall Fair.

Groups/clubs that are organized in SHS include S

The school also has a number of musical groups; Concert Band, Jazz Band, and House Band. Each of these groups meet after school on designated days, practicing and building a repertoire for concerts, many of which take place in the school's auditorium.

== District ==
Stephenville High School is part of the Newfoundland and Labrador English School District.
