= Stephenville International Airport =

Airport in Newfoundland & Labrador, Canada

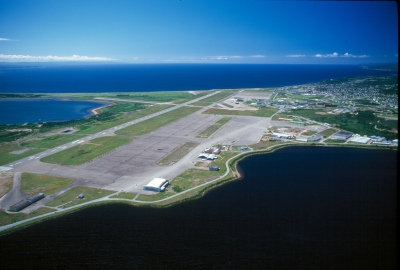
- IATA: YJT; ICAO: CYJT; WMO: 71815

Summary
- Airport type: Public
- Owner: Stephenville International Airport Corp.
- Location: Stephenville, Newfoundland and Labrador
- Time zone: NST (UTC−03:30)
  - Summer (DST): NDT (UTC−02:30)
- Elevation AMSL: 81 ft (25 m)
- Coordinates: 48°32′40″N 058°33′00″W
- Website: www.stephenvilleintl.com

Map
- Location in Newfoundland and Labrador CYJT (Canada)

Runways
Direction	Length		Surface
Direction	ft	m	Surface
09/27	10,011	3,051	Asphalt

Statistics (2023)
- Aircraft movements: 104
- Sources: Canada Flight Supplement; Environment Canada; Movements from Statistics Canada

Stephenville International Airport (IATA: YJT, ICAO: CYJT) is an aerodrome located 1.5 nautical miles (2.8 km; 1.7 mi) southeast of Stephenville, Newfoundland and Labrador, Canada. It was built by the United States Army Air Forces and operated as Ernest Harmon Air Force Base from 1941 to 1966.

The airport is classified as an airport of entry by Nav Canada and is staffed by the Canada Border Services Agency who are able to process general aviation with up to 30 passengers. As of June 2025, CBSA services at this site are suspended until further notice.

== History ==
In 1941 the United States obtained rights to construct a United States Army Air Forces base in the St. George's Bay area of Newfoundland. The U.S. 76th Congress approved the 99-year lease and in April 1941, construction began.

On 1 September 1943, Newfoundland Base Command transferred control of Harmon Field to the North Atlantic Wing, Air Transport Command.

The USAAF base was built as Stephenville Air Base. However, after the USAAF became the United States Air Force in 1947, it was renamed Ernest Harmon Air Force Base on June 23, 1948, in honour of Captain Ernest Emery Harmon. Harmon was a US Army Air Corps ace who was killed in an air crash in 1933.

The base became a part of Northeast Air Command in October, 1950. Then in April 1957, Strategic Air Command assumed control.

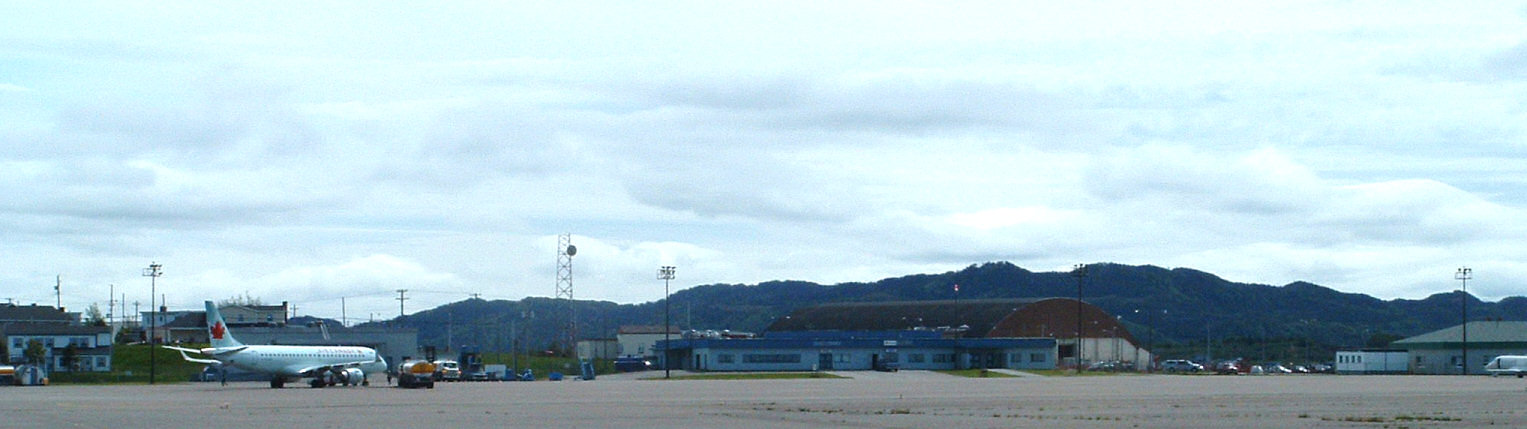
Airport ramp and terminal building

The mandate of the base was to maintain a tanker alert force and its capability to meet and refuel Strategic Air Command jet bombers en route to targets. The Boeing KC-97 Stratofreighter was employed in this task.

The base was also used as a refuelling stop for transatlantic military flights. In addition, Harmon supported three Air Defense Command units. In 1957, the Canadian Department of Transportation constructed an airport terminal to accommodate Trans-Canada Air Lines (now Air Canada). 1966 saw the closure of the U.S. Air Force Base in Stephenville.

Stephenville Airport was designated as an alternate in the Trans Oceanic Plane Stop (TOPS) program on 23 July 1970.

The Stephenville Airport was the major passenger airport for all of western Newfoundland until the early 1990s when provincial government decided to direct more traffic to the Deer Lake Regional Airport. All major Canadian carriers used Stephenville such as Air Canada, Eastern Provincial Airways and Canadian Airlines. It was one of five sites along eastern North America designated as an alternate landing site for the Space Shuttle orbiter during its launches and landings.

Stephenville International Airport was one of the locations of Operation Yellow Ribbon on September 11, 2001.

On 1 February 2018, the Canada Flight Supplement indicated that runway 02/20, which was 3,959 ft (1,207 m) long, had been closed.

In 2020, as a result of the COVID-19 pandemic, the airport suffered notable cuts to its airline routes. All airlines never returned to Stephenville as commercial aviation increased across Canada and at nearby Deer Lake Regional Airport.

=== Acquisition by Dymond Group ===
In September 2021, the Ottawa-based Dymond Group announced plans to purchase the airport and promised to invest $200 million in the airport and community. These promised investments were subsequently increased to $1 billion focused on the production of large, hydrogen-powered drones. The purchased closed in August 2023 for $6.90 plus the assumption of $1.1 million in liabilities.

Since the acquisition, the Dymond Group, whose source of capital is unclear, has had considerable financial difficulties. A Saskatchewan investor was awarded nearly $2 million in a 2024 default judgment for failure to repay a loan secured by the airport property, while a contractor is seeking $2.4 million for unpaid lighting work on the runway. Calgary-based BTG Capital Inc. acquired the rights to collect the judgment and holds a mortgage on the airport property.

In March 2025, Transport Canada downgraded the airport to a registered aerodrome.

On 3 June 2025, after Newfoundland Power disconnected the airport's electrical service over unpaid bills, the airport closed. Dymond CEO Carl Dymond stated that the closure would last "a few days."

On 22 January 2026, a judge with the Newfoundland and Labrador Supreme Court granted an application brought by BTG Capital Inc. to appoint an interim receiver for the airport in Stephenville. The appointment of Janes & Noseworthy Ltd. as interim receiver became effective immediately and lasts 30 days. On March 9, the Court placed the airport into receivership, and approved the receiver's proposal to put the airport up for sale.

The airport is owned and operated by the Stephenville International Airport Corporation Inc., a subsidiary of Calgary based BTG Capital.

== Former airlines and destinations ==
The airport currently does not have any commercial flights operating. Both PAL and Porter ended service in January 2020. Following the pandemic, passenger service resumed briefly with Sunwing seasonal flights, however, Sunwing discontinued all domestic flights following acquisition by Westjet in 2023.

Former destinations include:

Airlines	Destinations
Air Saint-Pierre	Charter: Saint-Pierre Pointe-Blanche Airport (until 2018)
PAL Airlines	Deer Lake, St. John's (until January 2020)
Porter Airlines	Seasonal: Halifax (until 2020), Ottawa, Toronto-Billy Bishop (until January 2020)
Sunwing Airlines	Seasonal: Toronto Pearson (Until 2022)

== Services ==
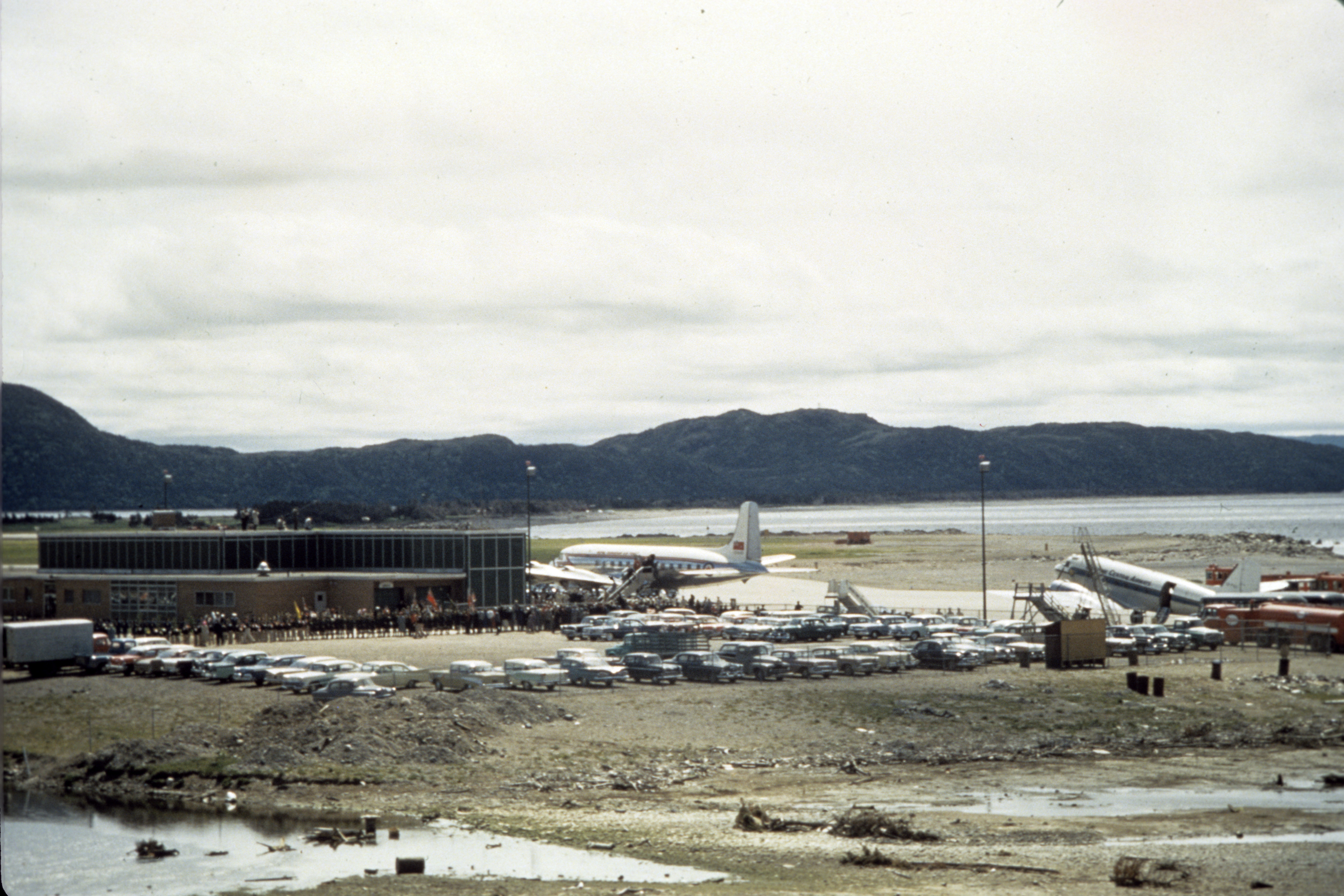
Stephenville Airport in 1963

- Vacant restaurant
- Airport check-in counters
- Ground transportation to and from hotels
- Passenger lounge
- FBO lounge
