= College of the North Atlantic =

Post-secondary public college in Newfoundland and Labrador

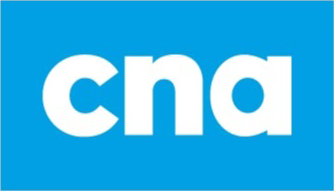
- Type: Public college
- Established: 1997
- Affiliations: CICan, CBIE
- President: Fergus O’Brien (acting)
- Students: 7,000 full time; 1,100 part-time (rounded)
- Undergraduates: Diploma and Certificate
- Location: Headquarters: Stephenville, Newfoundland and Labrador, Canada
- Campus: Suburban
- Colours: Cyan & Orange & Magenta & Green & Yellow & Red
- Website: www.cna.nl.ca

College of the North Atlantic (CNA, formerly CONA) is one of the largest post-secondary educational and skills training centres in Atlantic Canada, with a history dating back 50 years. The college has 17 campus locations throughout the province of Newfoundland and Labrador in Canada, various partner universities in China and formerly operated a technical education college for the State of Qatar in the Middle East. The enabling legislation is the College Act.

The headquarters for College of the North Atlantic and the Bay St. George campus are located in Stephenville, on the west coast of the island of Newfoundland. College of the North Atlantic offers nearly 100 full-time program offerings and more than 300 part-time courses for some 25,000 students each year.

CNA is a member of numerous national and international organizations, including Colleges and Institutes Canada (CICan). Through its membership with CICan, CNA has signed the Sustainable Development Goals (SDG) Accord.

== History ==
1963
District Vocational Schools (DVS) open around the province. Over the next few years DVS open in:

- Labrador City
- Happy Valley-Goose Bay
- St. Anthony
- Corner Brook
- Stephenville Crossing
- Port aux Basques
- Baie Verte
- Springdale
- Grand Falls - Windsor
- Lewisporte
- Gander
- Bonavista
- Clarenville
- Burin
- Placentia
- Carbonear
- Seal Cove

College of Trades and Technology opens in St. John's. Heavy Equipment School opens in Stephenville.

1967
Adult Upgrading Centre opens in Stephenville.

1977
Bay St. George Community College established in Stephenville encompassing the District Vocational School in Stephenville Crossing, the Adult Upgrading Centre and the Heavy Equipment School.

1987
Two Institutes and five Community Colleges are formed from the former District Vocational Schools, the College of Trades and Technology and the Bay St. George Community College. These Colleges are:

1. Cabot Institute
2. Fisher Technical College
3. Avalon Community College
4. Eastern Community College
5. Central Newfoundland Community College
6. Labrador Community College
7. Western Community College

1991
The Fisher Technical College is renamed the Fisher Institute of Applied Arts and Technology. Western Community College is renamed Western College of Applied Arts and Technology.

1992
Five Colleges of Applied Arts and Technology and Continuing Education are formed from the two Institutes and five Community Colleges. These Colleges are:

1. Cabot College
2. Eastern College
3. Central Newfoundland Community College
4. Westviking College
5. Labrador College

1997
College of the North Atlantic is formed from the five previous Colleges.

== Campuses ==
College of the North Atlantic has 17 campus locations throughout Newfoundland and Labrador. In 2022, CNA divested itself of the Qatar campus. In alphabetical order, CNA campus locations are in the following locations:

Campus name	Location	Coordinates
Baie Verte	Baie Verte	49°56′31.49″N 56°11′06.51″W
Bay St. George/Headquarters	Stephenville	48°33′53.90″N 58°34′07.41″W
Bonavista	Bonavista	
Burin	Burin	47°05′02.82″N 55°11′53.97″W
Carbonear	Carbonear	47°44′05.18″N 53°06′48.58″W
Clarenville	Clarenville	47°06′01.37″N 55°45′39.24″W
Corner Brook	Corner Brook	48°57′02.65″N 57°57′01.80″W
Gander	Gander	48°57′24.25″N 54°36′31.21″W
Grand Falls-Windsor	Grand Falls-Windsor	48°56′22.71″N 55°39′41.36″W
Happy Valley-Goose Bay	Happy Valley-Goose Bay	53°19′09.25″N 60°25′32.83″W
Labrador West	Labrador West	52°56′18.51″N 66°54′48.67″W
Placentia	Placentia	47°14′11.49″N 53°58′20.30″W
Port Aux Basques	Port aux Basques	47°33′57.65″N 59°08′49.73″W
Prince Philip Drive	St. John's	47°35′13.77″N 52°43′14.23″W
Ridge Road	St. John's	47°35′17.07″N 52°44′03.67″W
Seal Cove	Conception Bay South	47°27′58.13″N 53°05′00.79″W
St. Anthony	St. Anthony	51°22′18.84″N 55°35′49.66″W

== Facilities ==
In addition to primary campus buildings, the Bay St. George campus includes the Centre for Heavy Equipment and Transportation Technology (CHETT).

The Prince Philip Drive campus includes the Paul L. Pope Centre for TV & Film as well as the Topsail Road Office. The latter houses CNA’s Office of Applied Research and Innovation (OARI), including its Innovative Product Development Lab and Reality Capture and Digitization Technology Access Centre. OARI also operates a mobile Hyperspectral Scanning Unit.

== See also ==
- Higher education in Newfoundland and Labrador
- List of universities in Newfoundland and Labrador
- Canadian Interuniversity Sport
- Canadian government scientific research organizations
- Canadian university scientific research organizations
- Canadian industrial research and development organizations
