= Terra Transport =

Defunct subsidiary of the Canadian National Railway serving Newfoundland

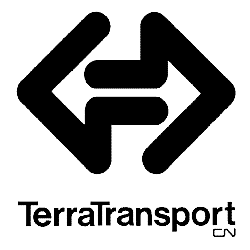

Overview
- Headquarters: St. John's, Newfoundland and Labrador
- Reporting mark: CN, TT
- Locale: Newfoundland, Canada
- Dates of operation: 1979–1988

Technical
- Track gauge: 3 ft 6 in (1,067 mm), track abandoned 1988

Terra Transport (TT) was the name for the Newfoundland Transportation Division, a wholly owned subsidiary of Canadian National Railway (CN), created in 1979 as a means to organize the company's operations on Newfoundland.

== Background ==
Canadian National Railways acquired the Newfoundland Railway from the Government of Newfoundland in 1949 under that dominion's Terms of Union of entry into Confederation. The majority of the Newfoundland Railway's operations were not economically self-sustaining, requiring significant subsidization; however, it was only after the construction of the Trans-Canada Highway across the island in the early 1960s that the railway began to see serious declines in traffic.

At the same time, CN took over the Newfoundland Railway's ferry service between North Sydney, Nova Scotia, and Port aux Basques, Newfoundland, and promptly began to improve the service, bringing in vessels dedicated to carrying automobiles and trucks throughout the 1950s–1970s.

By the early 1970s, CN faced increased scrutiny from federal politicians complaining about the railway's continuous losses. Successive federal governments of the period had frequently forced the company to undertake various endeavours in the national interest, often at the expense of business and economic logic. As a result, CN sought to restructure itself, placing many of these operations into separate subsidiaries to clarify the accounting behind their existence. Restructuring applied to operations which lost money and required subsidization, or which were not part of CN's core freight railway business.

In 1977, all east coast ferries operated by CN were transferred to a new CN Subsidiary, CN Marine. Passenger rail services were transferred to the new Crown corporation, Via Rail, and in 1979, all of CN's freight railway operations on Newfoundland, along with the CN Roadcruiser Bus service and CN's trucking operation, were placed into a new division named Terra Transport.

== CN on Newfoundland ==
CN's operations on Newfoundland revolved around the former Newfoundland Railway, which was the longest 3 ft 6 in (1,067 mm) narrow-gauge railway in North America, stretching approximately 1000 km across the island, from the ferry terminal in Port aux Basques to the provincial capital at St. John's. Many of the island's largest communities developed along the main line, largely because of their location; as a result, the Trans-Canada Highway paralleled its route in many places.

Rail operations in Newfoundland remained economically unfeasible because of slow service times, a side effect of the narrow-gauge format. CN invested heavily in track improvements during the 1950s-1960s, but the narrow-gauge operation could not compete with the flexibility of trucks. Significant time was lost at Port aux Basques, where standard-gauge railway cars from mainland North America were lifted off their bogies and onto narrow-gauge bogies for use on Newfoundland. In some cases this was not possible, and the rail car contents were unloaded and reloaded onto narrow-gauge cars. CN's operation of dedicated railway car ferries was an additional expense.

CN operated a main line passenger train, the Caribou, from St. John's to Port aux Basques. Nicknamed the Newfie Bullet, the Caribou operated until June 1969, when it was replaced by the CN Roadcruiser bus service started in the Fall of 1968. With the demise of the Caribou, the only passenger services remaining on the island were mixed freight and passenger trains on the Bonavista, Carbonear, and Argentia branch lines, and on the main-line between Bishop's Falls and Corner Brook. Terra Transport would continue to operate mixed passenger/freight service on the branch lines until 1984. The mainline service between Corner Brook and Bishop's Falls made its last run on 30 September 1988. The Roadcruiser bus service ran until 29 March 1996, when it was sold to DRL Coachlines of Triton, Newfoundland.

The most significant change made under the Terra Transport subsidiary was the move to the carriage of less-than-carload (LCL) freight. A large fleet of distinctive green intermodal shipping containers were ordered and used in place of boxcars. These containers were stacked on flatcars of mainland trains, fitted onto the decks inside the ferries, and then placed on flatcars of trains in Newfoundland, or transported entirely by truck. During the mid-1980s, trains composed almost entirely of the distinctive TT containers were common. The handling time for freight dropped considerably, as containers could be easily removed from the trains in each community and the loading/unloading at Port aux Basques 3 ft 6 in (1,067 mm) was significantly improved over standard freight cars. Another significant change the closure and abandonment all of CN's branch lines in the province by 1984, leaving only the main line operational.

Despite these changes, Terra Transport was unable to turn a profit for CN and the federal government. Specialized ferries were still needed for carrying non-LCL railway cars, and by the mid-1980s were approaching the end of their operational life and required replacement. The election of a Conservative federal government brought about the elimination of subsidies for money-losing operations. In 1986, one of two remaining railcar ferries was sold off as the government converted CN Marine into Marine Atlantic, completely separating the rail and ferry services. Terra Transport operations were largely captive on Newfoundland and would specialize in handling import/export LCL and inter-island non-LCL freight.

== Abandonment ==
In 1987, the federal government deregulated the railway industry in Canada and CN promptly applied to abandon its Newfoundland operations under Terra Transport. The political firestorm which followed saw the federal and provincial governments negotiate a one-time payout of $800 million (CAD) from Ottawa to St. John's to fund highway improvements under the Trans-Canada Highway Program and the Regional Trunk Road Agreement.

The agreements were signed in December 1987; however, continuing public outcry and legal challenges kept the railway operational for several months. On 20 June 1988, it was officially announced that the railway would cease operations as of 1 September 1988. Some freight trains still ran until late September, with the last scheduled run on 29 September 1988. The last scheduled passenger train ran on 30 September 1988, from Bishops Falls to Corner Brook. Following official abandonment, the railway operated salvage trains, dismantling track in remote locations; some salvage trains were still operating in the summer of 1990. Most of the track was removed and scrapped by November 1990. CN no longer has any operations in the Province of Newfoundland and Labrador.

Since 1997, the old railbed has been reclaimed as the Newfoundland T'Railway Provincial Park.
