= Western College, Stephenville, Newfoundland =

Coordinates: 48.5506°N 58.5585°W

Western College is a private career college located in Stephenville, Newfoundland and Labrador, Canada. Founded in 1993, the college is a part of CompuCollege and an affiliate of Eastern College.
