= DRL Coachlines =

Canadian motor coach operator for Newfoundland

DRL Coachlines is a motor coach bus company operating in the Canadian province of Newfoundland and Labrador.

Wholly owned by DRL Group of Triton, the bus company provided charter services before it took over Terra Transport Roadcruiser services on the island of Newfoundland in 1996.

== Inter-city service ==
The company's primary service consists of a pair of daily buses, one in each direction, closely following the entire length of provincial Route 1. The stops are as follows:

- Channel-Port aux Basques (Marine Atlantic ferry terminal)
- Doyles (Mountain Side General Store)
- Robinson's Junction (M&M Farming)
- Stephenville (Canadian Tire Gas Bar)
- Corner Brook (Confederation Drive Circle K)
- Pasadena (Pasadena Convenience Plus)
- Deer Lake (Circle K)
- Hampden Junction (White Bay Convenience)
- Springdale Junction (Butt's Esso)
- South Brook (Eddy's Restaurant)
- Badger (Loder's Irving)
- Grand Falls-Windsor (Westwood Inn)
- Bishop's Falls (Circle K)
- Lewisporte (Brittany Inns)
- Gander (Gander International Airport)
- Gambo (Chestnut Tree Cafe)
- Eastport Junction (Splash n' Putt)
- Port Blandford (Rudy's Gas Bar)
- Clarenville (Circle K)
- Goobies Junction (Circle K)
- Whitbourne Junction (Circle K)
- Paradise (Topsail Road Circle K)
- St. John's (Memorial University of Newfoundland)

== History ==
DRL subsequently expanded its charter services into neighbouring Nova Scotia and New Brunswick. It also received a license to operate an inter-city bus route from Halifax to Yarmouth via Bridgewater on the South Shore, and was a contract school bus operator for the Annapolis Valley Regional School Board. Tickets are purchased on the bus and only cash is accepted.

Problems arose in the mid-2000s when the company lost its operating licenses for intercity, charter and school buses in Nova Scotia and New Brunswick after government transport regulators were informed of safety problems and maintenance issues resulting from DRL Coachlines service, in addition to tax problems that the company was facing. DRL Coachlines has also faced several complaints about its inter-city bus services in Newfoundland and Labrador, where it has a monopoly.

The company suspended operations during the COVID-19 pandemic in 2020, but resumed operations on June 18, 2020.
