= MV John Hamilton Gray =

Former Marine Atlantic ferry

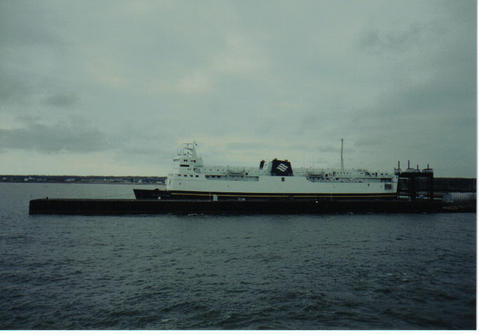
- MV John Hamilton Gray

History
- Name: John Hamilton Gray
- Namesake: John Hamilton Gray
- Builder: Marine Industries Ltd., Sorel
- Launched: May 1965
- Completed: October 1968
- In service: 1968
- Out of service: 2004
- Refit: 1980, upper vehicle deck rear loading added, side loading hatch closed in, top-side wood outer decks removed; 1997, passenger deck overhauled into a casino
- Homeport: Borden, PEI (1968–1997); Palm Beach, Florida (1998–2001); Port Aransas, Texas (2001–2004)
- Identification: IMO number: 6803399
- Fate: Scrapped, 2004

General characteristics
- Type: Ferry
- Displacement: 10,678 long tons (10,849 t)
- Length: 122.1 m (400 ft 7 in)
- Beam: 21.09 m (69 ft 2 in)
- Draught: 6.19 m (20 ft 4 in)
- Ice class: 3 East Coast 100 A1
- Propulsion: 8 × Fairbanks Morse 12-38D8-1/8 12-cylinder opposing piston engines 11,768 kW (15,781 hp)
- Speed: 18 knots (33 km/h; 21 mph)
- Capacity: 516 passengers; 165 car equivalents and 18 tractor trailers or 16 railway cars

MV John Hamilton Gray was an icebreaking railway, vehicle, and passenger ferry which operated across the Abegweit Passage of Northumberland Strait, connecting Port Borden to Cape Tormentine between 1968–1997.

John Hamilton Gray was named in honour of two different people who shared the same name:

- John Hamilton Gray, the fifth premier of the British colony of Prince Edward Island and one of Canada's Fathers of Confederation.
- John Hamilton Gray, the second premier of the British colony of New Brunswick and also one of Canada's Fathers of Confederation.

Both men lived in the same era and ended up in public service in the neighbouring colonies of Prince Edward Island and New Brunswick, which this vessel would connect as a ferry.

== Service history ==
=== Ferry service ===
John Hamilton Gray was constructed by Marine Industries Limited at their shipyard in Sorel, Quebec, as hull number 349, with sub-assemblies built by Davie Shipyard at their yard in Lauzon. The vessel was launched in May 1965, while the subassemblies were towed by barge to Sorel to be completed on the ferry. She was fitted out on November 1, 1967, and delivered in October 1968. The sea trials took place in September 1968. Her designers were the Montreal design firm of German & Milne. Her owner was the Canadian National Railway (CN), operator of the Borden–Tormentine service from 1918 to 1977.

Beginning in May 1972, John Hamilton Gray was used during the peak travel season on CN's Cabot Strait services from North Sydney to Channel-Port aux Basques and Argentia. The seasonal service to Newfoundland typically lasted until November, whereby John Hamilton Gray would return to the Northumberland Strait service for the winter icebreaking season where she served alongside MV Abegweit (1947). Her summer participation in the Newfoundland service ended in September 1988 in advance of MV Joseph and Clara Smallwood's entry into service in 1989.

In 1977, CN created a subsidiary CN Marine to operate its ferry services. In 1986, CN Marine changed its name to Marine Atlantic, the last operator of the ferry service between Borden and Cape Tormentine. Throughout the 1970s until the new Abegweit (1982) entered service in 1982, John Hamilton Gray was the largest and most powerful ferry on the Northumberland Strait.

John Hamilton Gray was designed to be compatible with the A Dock at both Borden and Cape Tormentine which was in use by the original Abegweit (and whose design is traced to SS Prince Edward Island). John Hamilton Gray loaded only from the stern on the lower rail/truck deck, however, until a modification in the early 1980s (in advance of the arrival of the new Abegweit), the upper car deck was loaded from a side hatch at the stern. The modification in the early 1980s saw the side hatch sealed and a stern loading hatch added.

On December 31, 1989, John Hamilton Gray hauled the last railcars and locomotives off Prince Edward Island as CN Rail abandoned its former Prince Edward Island Railway trackage in the province. John Hamilton Gray was chartered for two summers by Croisières Carleton-les-Îles, a private ferry company in Quebec's Gaspé Peninsula during 1995 and 1996, running a passenger-vehicle service between Carleton-sur-Mer and Cap-aux-Meules, Quebec in the Magdalen Islands.

John Hamilton Gray departed the Northumberland Strait for the final time on April 28, 1997, when she headed to Point Edward, Nova Scotia for disposal. The pending opening of the Confederation Bridge on May 31, 1997, would result in the permanent closure of the ferry service and Marine Atlantic only required three vessels (MV Holiday Island, MV Vacationland, and Abegweit) during the last month of operation.

=== Casino cruise service and fate ===
John Hamilton Gray was sold in July 1997 at Point Edward by the Government of Canada's Crown Assets Division to Contessa International, a casino cruise company in the United States. The vessel was overhauled at a shipyard in Les Méchins, Quebec, and departed for West Palm Beach, Florida, in November, no longer a ferry but a casino cruise ship. Operating under the new name Contessa I, the vessel operated cruises from West Palm Beach from 1998 to 2001. Still owned by Contessa International, she was managed by Kyma Ship Management of Panama and renamed Texas Treasure II. The vessel operated casino cruises from Freeport, Texas in late 2001 and early 2002 then from Port Aransas, Texas, for the remainder of the 2002 season before being mothballed at Freeport, Bahamas, and placed for sale, following the failure of U.S. Coast Guard safety and U.S. government hygiene inspections.

The vessel was renamed Treasure and sailed to the Alang Ship Breaking Yard in Alang, India. The Lloyd's Registry shows the vessel as demolished on March 15, 2004; however, records indicate that the vessel departed Freeport on April 30, 2004, passing the Suez Canal on June 11 and being scrapped later that month.
