= Argentia =

Port of Argentia Town of Placentia
- Commercial Seaport & Industrial Park
- Location of the Port of Argentia in Placentia, Newfoundland Port of Argentia (Canada)
- Coordinates: 47°18′11″N 53°59′19″W
- Country: Canada
- Province: Newfoundland and Labrador

Government
- Time zone: UTC−03:30 (NST)
  - Summer (DST): UTC−02:30 (NDT)
- Area code: 709
- Highways: Route 100; Marine Atlantic Nova Scotia Ferry
- Website: Port of Argentia

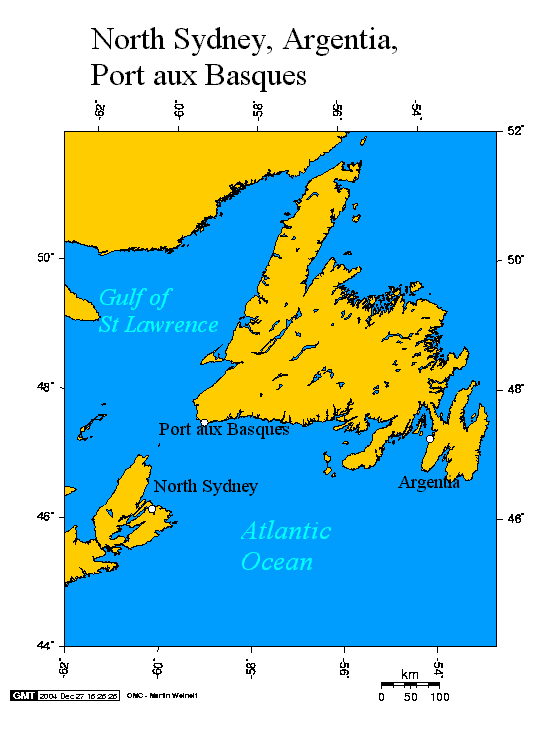
Argentia and the other Marine Atlantic ferry ports

Argentia (/ɑːrˈdʒɛntʃə/ ar-JEN-chə) is a Canadian commercial seaport and industrial park located in the Town of Placentia, Newfoundland and Labrador. It is situated on the southwest coast of the Avalon Peninsula and defined by a triangular shaped headland which reaches northward out into Placentia Bay creating a natural harbour 3 km (1.9 mi) in length.

Originally settled by the French in the 1630s that fishing settlement was called Petit Plaisance, meaning "Pleasant Little Place". The name was retained in English (Little Placentia) when the French lost control of the area following the Treaty of Utrecht in 1713. The census of 1706 records 149 individuals in 14 habitations. The community adopted its present name (unofficially in 1895 and officially in 1901) for the presence of silver ore near Broad Cove Point on the east side of the harbour.

The name "Argentia" is Latin, meaning "Land of Silver" and was chosen by Father John St. John, the parish priest at Holy Rosary Parish from September 18, 1895, to February 11, 1911. The Silver Cliff Mine operated until the early 1920s but was never profitable. Through most of the 19th century, the fishery was the lifeblood of the community; the Newfoundland Commission of Government built a herring factory at Argentia in 1936.

The first church and school were established by Father Pelagius Nowlan in 1835. He was from Ireland and moved to Newfoundland as a missionary priest. In 1836, population was made up 484 people in 76 houses.

== Railway comes to town ==
Construction started on a branch line to nearby Placentia from the Harbour Grace Railway mainline near Whitbourne (what would later become part of the Newfoundland Railway) on October 14, 1886, and the 26 mi (42 km) of track were completed by October 1888. This line became known as the "Placentia Branch" and it served as a key route to Placentia and the nearby port and anchorage of Little Placentia where coastal ferries would run to outports along the south coast of the island.

The Newfoundland Railway chose Port aux Basques to be its western terminus in 1893 and a new ferry intended for service to North Sydney, Nova Scotia, was built in Scotland. In October 1897, the new vessel named the SS Bruce arrived but the docks at Port aux Basques had not been completed. As a result, from October until June, 1898 (when it reverted to Port aux Basques), the Bruce operated first from Placentia and then from Little Placentia to North Sydney.

== Death of a village ==
=== Second World War ===
War between Britain and Nazi Germany was declared on September 3, 1939, after Adolf Hitler's forces invaded Poland.

Argentia was selected in 1940 to be the location of the United States Navy's Naval Station Argentia being built under the United States-British Destroyers for Bases Agreement (which preceded the introduction of Lend-Lease in 1941) which saw fifty obsolete US destroyers given to Britain in exchange for control of selected lands controlled by Britain in the Western Hemisphere. The Argentia site was selected due to its proximity to Europe, the relatively ice-free nature of Placentia Bay, the safe navigational access channel, the sheltered harbour with secure deepwater anchorages nearby at Fox Harbour and Ship Harbour, as well as the local topography for an airfield and the existing railway line.

The base was urgently needed as part of the trans-Atlantic supply line which joined North America to Britain, in order to provide anti-submarine patrols to protect shipping from the German U-boat fleet.

=== Lend-lease arrangement ===
The land beneath the village was traded to the United States for construction of the base under the Destroyers for Bases Agreement and the residents of Argentia and Marquise received the following notices:

In exercise of the powers conferred upon me by the Defence (requisition of land) Regulations, made under the Emergency Powers Defence Act 1940, on the 28th day of December AD 1940, I do authorize all persons who shall be engaged by the United States Government or its agents and contractors on the construction for that government of any naval, military or air works at Argentia to do any work on any land or place any thing in, on, or over any land upon the Argentia Peninsula, insofar as it shall be necessary for any such person so to do for the carrying out of any such work of construction including any preliminary work in relation thereto.

Provided, however, that this present authority shall not be valid to authorize the demolition, pulling down or destruction of any building or erection upon any such land, or the doing of any act which renders any such building or erection intangible.

Signed, Wilfrid Woods, Commissioner for Public Utilities

"The Defence (requisition of land) Regulations made under the Emergency Powers Defence Act 1940 on the 28th day of December, A.D., 1940.

I have to notify you that the lands and buildings lately belonging to and occupied by you at Argentia, for which said lands and buildings payment has been awarded, are required for occupation by the Government of Newfoundland not later than ________. Take notice, therefore, that the said premises must be completely vacated by you and peaceably yielded up to the Government of Newfoundland, its servants, agents, on or before the date mentioned.

Signed: WW Woods, Commissioner for Public Utilities"

=== Relocation ===
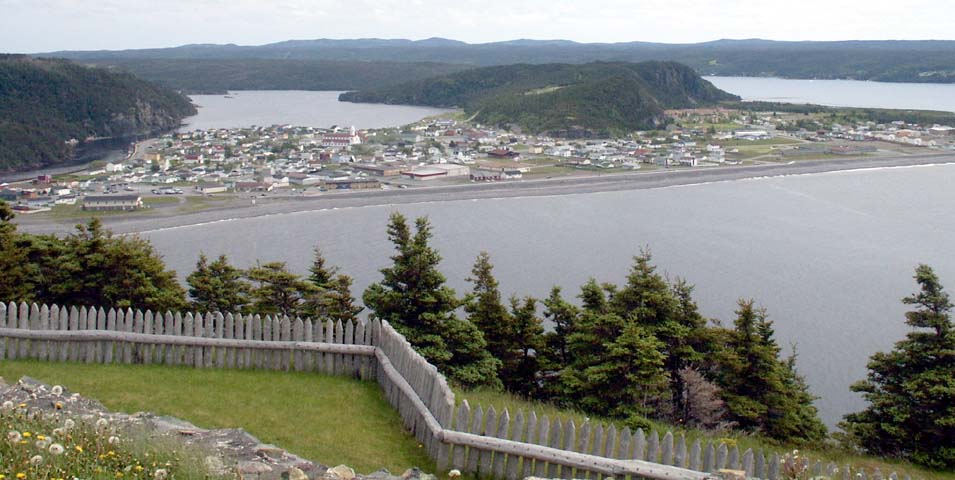
When Argentia village was demolished during the Second World War, its people were moved mostly to nearby Placentia

Most people relocated to the nearby villages of Freshwater or Placentia. However, what little had been paid as compensation (usually no more than a few thousand dollars for homeowners in Argentia) proved inadequate for building equivalent new homes due to severe wartime shortages of labour and materials.

Those buried in the three local graveyards were exhumed and reburied in a new cemetery constructed by the US forces at the insistence of the local parish priest, Father A. J. Dee, who had also raised objections to the wartime delays in finding new housing for Argentia's living residents who were being forced to leave the village. The abandoned homes were ultimately burned or levelled by bulldozers.

The US flag was raised in Argentia on February 13, 1941.

== Timeline ==
- 1503

Portuguese Visit Placentia Bay

- 1630

French settled Plaisance (Placentia), Petite Plaisance (Argentia), and Pointe Verte (Point Verde)

- 1831

Father Pelagius Nowlan established Holy Rosary Parish and became first parish priest

- 1835

Bishop Michael Anthony Fleming visits the parish

- 1871

Father Pelagius Nowlan died in Little Placentia

- 1871

Father Robert Brennan became parish priest

- 1895

Father St. John becomes parish priest

- 1895

Name of Little Placentia unofficially changed to Argentia

- 1901

Little Placentia's name officially changed to Argentia

- 1911

Father John Ashley became parish priest

- 1911

Population of Great Placentia is 1,315

- 1918

Father Thomas Devereaux became parish priest for several months

- 1918

Father J.D. Savin became parish priest

- 1921

Population of Argentia was 392 (not including Marquise, Pond Head, Point Mall, Argentia Crossing, Long Hill, etc.)

- 1921

Population of Marquise was 262

- 1921

Population of Long Hill was 3

- 1921

Population of Point Mall was 59

- 1922

Father Adrian Joyce Dee became parish priest and held position until 1951

- 1941

US Marines occupied Argentia

- 1941

US flag formally raised

- July 15, 1941

Naval Operating Base commissioned

- August 10, 1941

Atlantic Charter meeting between President Franklin D. Roosevelt and Prime Minister Winston Churchill was held aboard US and British vessels at anchor within Ship Harbour

- August 28, 1941

Naval Air Station commissioned

- 1942

USS Pollux and USS Truxtun were lost when wrecked near St. Lawrence and Lawn on their way to Argentia

- 1942

US Army Base, Fort McAndrew, established at Argentia

- Summer of 1942

US Army Air Units arrive at base in Argentia and assisted in anti-submarine patrols

- February 1943

The first Bachelor Officer Quarters building at the Naval Air Station burns to the ground in disastrous million dollar fire

- 1944

United States Atlantic Fleet Task Force 22 used Argentia extensively in anti-submarine operations

- 1944

Captured German weather ship, the Externstein, was brought into Argentia by Commodore Rose

- May 6, 1945

European War ends

- 1945

Rear Admiral Edward H. Smith relieved as Commander, Task Force 24, by Rear Admiral E. G. Rose

- 1945

Two German submarines captured in Europe stop at Argentia en route to the United States. U-Boats, sailed on the surface by prize crews, put in for fuel, repairs, provisions, and stores

- 1956

Comedian Bill Cosby is stationed at Argentia

- 1994

US Base officially closed

- 1999

Bachelor Officer Quarters Implosion

== Naval Station Argentia ==
Throughout 1940–1941 the US Navy constructed an airfield and navy base and built an extension to the Newfoundland Railway to service their facilities, owing to the condition of local roads. The navy base construction in particular was a priority with Navy Operating Base Argentia being officially commissioned on July 15, 1941.

=== Atlantic Charter ===
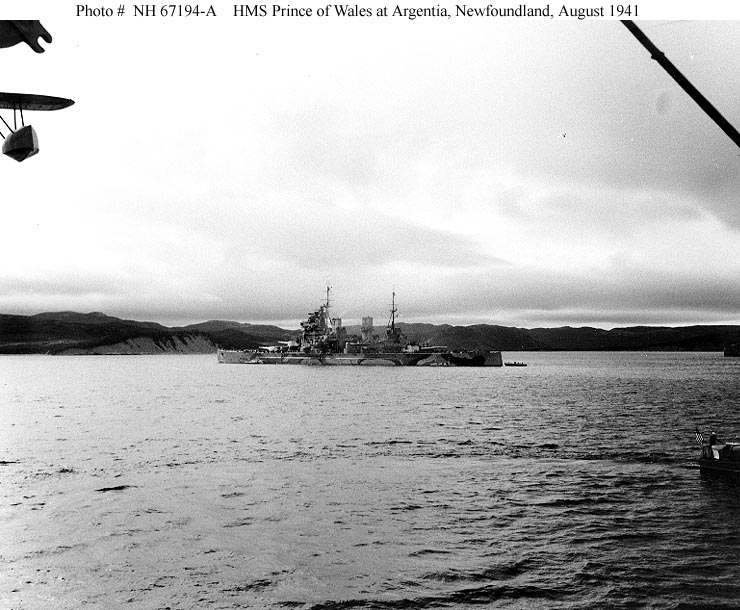
HMS Prince of Wales in Ship Harbour, Newfoundland for the Atlantic Charter

The reason for the rush was made clear on August 7, 1941, when the heavy cruiser USS Augusta (CA-31) carrying U.S. President Franklin D. Roosevelt arrived at an anchorage outside Argentia near Ship Harbour. Roosevelt inspected the base construction progress and did some fishing from Augusta over the next two days. Augusta was joined by the British warship HMS Prince of Wales carrying British Prime Minister Winston Churchill on August 9, 1941. While in the Ship Harbour anchorage from August 9–12, the chiefs of staff of Britain and the US met to discuss the war strategies and logistics once the US joined the war. The two leaders and their aides also negotiated the wording of a press release that they called a "joint statement". Though not drafted as a legal agreement requiring signatures, Roosevelt and Churchill did sign their own draft markups of the joint statement which was issued as a press release on August 14, 1941, in Washington, D.C., and was issued simultaneously in London, England. Several days later the Daily Herald, a London newspaper, would characterize the contents of that press release as the Atlantic Charter statement.

On August 28, 1941, Naval Station Argentia was officially commissioned by the US Navy. Argentia would prove to be an important base in the US war effort; by 1943 with the U.S. fully involved in the Second World War, Argentia saw upwards of 10,000 US personnel passing through on the way to the European Theatre. An adjoining United States Army base was established as Fort McAndrew to provide anti-aircraft artillery protection for the navy base and naval air station. In 1946 Fort McAndrew became part of the United States Army Air Forces and was renamed McAndrew Air Force Base in 1948.

=== Cold War ===
With VE in 1945, Argentia saw a drop in personnel but by the start of the Cold War in 1947–1948, personnel numbers rose to 7,000. By the end of the Korean War in 1953, Argentia saw a total of 8,500 personnel posted in the area.

In 1955 McAndrew AFB was deactivated and turned over to the US Navy as the US Air Force moved its personnel to more remote and northern locations along the coast of Newfoundland and Labrador to build radar stations which would become part of the Pinetree Line and DEW Line systems. In the 1960s Naval Station Argentia became a key "node" in the US Navy's SOSUS underwater hydrophone system. As such, the base was the target for several espionage attempts by the Soviet Union. By 1969 the total US Navy and Marine Corps contingents had dropped to 3,000 and to 1,000 by 1971.

=== Closure and abandonment ===
As facilities and structures closed, assets were transferred to the Government of Canada under the terms of the U.S.-Britain lend-lease program; Newfoundland having become a Canadian province in 1949. In 1973 Naval Air Station Argentia was closed and by 1975 the entire north side of the base was out of US hands. In 1994 Naval Operating Base Argentia, was officially decommissioned and the site was transferred to the Government of Canada. From 1994 to 2007, the Government of Canada carried out a $106 million environmental remediation program at Argentia which included the removal of many building structures, and the clean up, removal or safe containment of various hazardous materials on the land and in the water about the site. Concurrently, by 2001, the site was turned over to a private, not-for-profit organization to manage and lead the redevelopment of Argentia.

With the military base now closed, Argentia has no permanent residents and is zoned as an industrial area in support of its redevelopment as a seaport and industrial park for the Town of Placentia.

== Redevelopment ==
Argentia became part of Town of Placentia in 1993, along with Freshwater, Dunville, Jerseyside and townside Placentia.

By the end of 2001, Government of Canada had negotiated land transfer agreements to return the lands which formerly comprised the US Naval Base to local ownership and control. Port of Argentia, is the port and property authority for the industrial area and is utilizing these former naval base properties to lead the redevelopment of the site to revitalize the local economy and quality of life in the region.

In June 2002, Inco announced an agreement with the Government of Newfoundland and Labrador on a three phase plan to develop the Voisey's Bay nickel deposit. The $1 billion initial phase of the Voisey's Bay agreement provided for mine and mill infrastructure development at Voisey's Bay, and a research and development program in hydrometallurgical processing which would include a demonstration plant to be built at Argentia. the demonstration plant at Argentia was constructed and operated from 2004 to 2007. The demonstration plant was an initial step toward the ultimate development of a commercial hydrometallurgical processing facility, the Long Harbour Nickel Processing Plant, to be constructed and operated in Long Harbour.

In October, 2013, Husky Energy and the Government of Newfoundland and Labrador announced an agreement to amend the White Rose Development. White Rose is the name of an oil field offshore Newfoundland. The announcement included the news that this oil resource could be exploited by installing a gravity based 'wellhead platform' structure over the western section of the oil field on the ocean floor in approximately 120 m (390 ft) of water. To support this billion dollar wellhead platform construction project, Husky announced that it would be establishing a graving dock facility on the Northside Peninsula at Argentia to support the construction of the concrete base of the wellhead platform. Construction of the graving dock began in late 2013 and was finished in early 2015. However, in December 2014, Husky announced that, due to declining oil prices, the decision to construct the Concrete Gravity Base (CGS) had been deferred.

== Transportation ==
=== Airport ===
The former US Navy Air Station airfield on the Northside Peninsula has not been active for air traffic since 1973 other than for the Air Cadet Gliding Program.

=== Ferry terminal ===
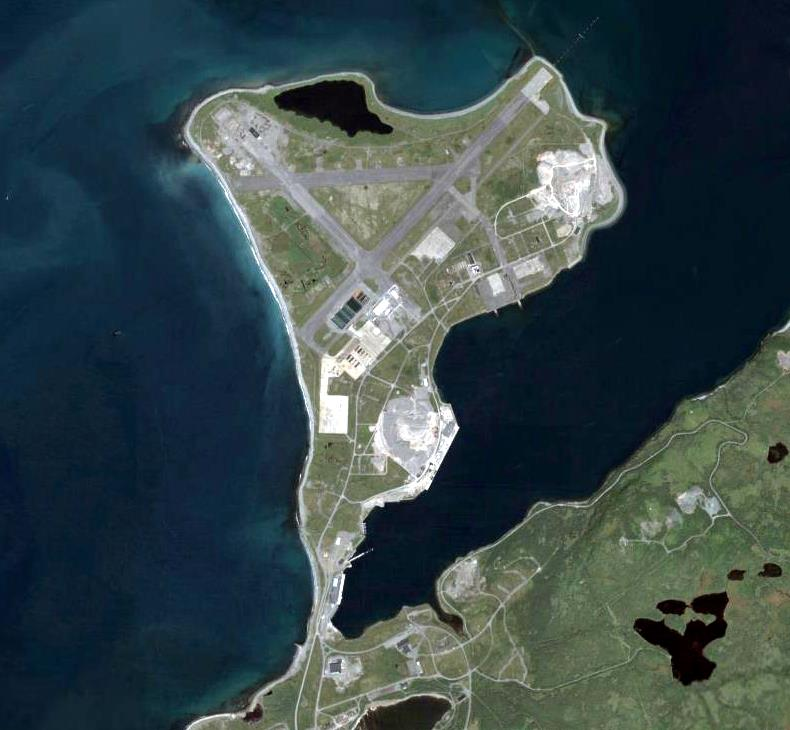
Naval Station Argentia

By the mid-1960s roads were upgraded between Argentia and the newly opened Trans-Canada Highway at Whitbourne. In 1967 a new ferry terminal was opened by Canadian National Railway and the Ambrose Shea became the first seasonal ferry to call at the port, largely carrying tourists bound for the Avalon Peninsula (19 hours crossing time) from North Sydney, Nova Scotia. In the 1980s the terminal was upgraded by CN Marine and in 1989 the company's successor, Marine Atlantic, welcomed the MV Joseph and Clara Smallwood ferry (14 hours crossing time) on the Argentia summer run, until 2011, when it was replaced by the MV Blue Puttees and MV Highlanders.

== See also ==
- List of communities in Newfoundland and Labrador
- Pepperrell Air Force Base
- Ernest Harmon Air Force Base
- MV William Carson
