= MV Joseph and Clara Smallwood =

Former Marine Atlantic ferry

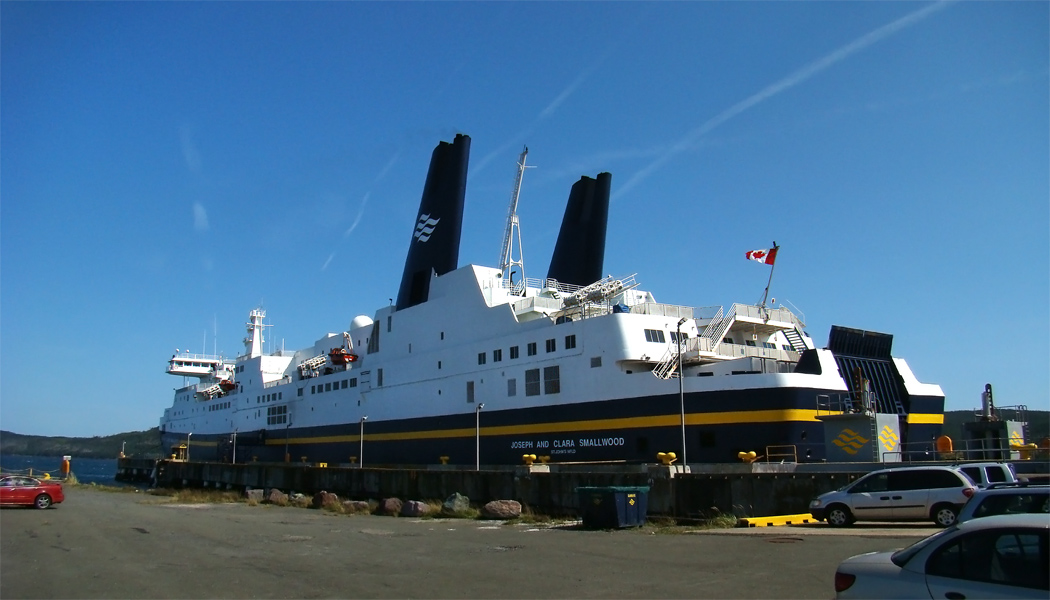
- Docking in Argentia, Newfoundland and Labrador

History
- Name: Joseph and Clara Smallwood (1989–2011); Smallwood (2011)
- Owner: Government of Canada
- Operator: Marine Atlantic
- Port of registry: St. John's
- Route: Channel-Port aux Basques–North Sydney (fall, winter, spring); Argentia–North Sydney (summer)
- Ordered: 1987
- Builder: MIL-Davie Shipbuilding, Lauzon
- Laid down: 1987
- Launched: 1989
- Christened: 1989
- Completed: 1989
- Maiden voyage: 1989
- In service: 1989
- Out of service: 2011
- Identification: IMO number 8604797
- Fate: Broken up in 2011

General characteristics (as built)
- Class & type: Gulfspan class icebreaking ropax ferry
- Tonnage: 27,615 GT
- Length: 172.76 m (567 ft)
- Beam: 24.99 m (82 ft)
- Draught: 12.19 m (40 ft 0 in)
- Ramps: shore-based bi-level ramps
- Ice class: Lloyd's 100A1, Northern Baltic 1A Super
- Installed power: 4 × MaK 8-cylinder diesels; combined 20600 kW
- Propulsion: 2 propellers; 2 bow thrusters; 2 stern thrusters
- Speed: 22 knots (41 km/h; 25 mph) (maximum); 15 knots (28 km/h; 17 mph) (service)
- Capacity: 1,200 passengers; 370 cars, 77 trucks; 1,800 m (5,906 ft) lane metres
- Crew: 106 (summer), 68 (winter)

MV Joseph and Clara Smallwood was a Marine Atlantic passenger/vehicle ferry which operated in the Gulf of St. Lawrence, between Newfoundland and Cape Breton Island in eastern Canada.

She is named after former Newfoundland premier Joseph R. Smallwood and his wife Clara.

== Concept and construction ==
MV Joseph and Clara Smallwood entering service in 1989, she was built by MIL Davie Incorporated in Lauzon, Quebec, and was specifically designed for the 520 km (280 nmi) seasonal route between North Sydney, Nova Scotia and Argentia, Newfoundland and Labrador. A roll-on, roll-off design with a bow visor, Joseph and Clara Smallwood had 2 vehicle decks and 5 decks above, the main passenger deck being Deck 5. She measured 180 m (580 ft) in overall length and 25 metres (82 ft) in breadth, weighing 27,614 tons. Her capacity included 1,200 passengers and 350 automobiles or 77 tractor trailers. She had up to 106 crewmembers.

Joseph and Clara Smallwood was the sister ship to MV Caribou. Caribou was designed and commissioned by CN Marine in the early 1980s and was the culmination of years of research into effective icebreaking ship designs. The resulting hull design which Caribou and Joseph and Clara Smallwood were built to is called "Gulfspan", named in part after the Gulf of St. Lawrence. The "Gulfspan" hull is unique among Canadian ice-reinforced ships in that the ship slices through sea ice, rather than using its weight to ride up onto and crush the ice underneath. This design permits the sister ships to maintain close to regular operating speed.

== Service history ==
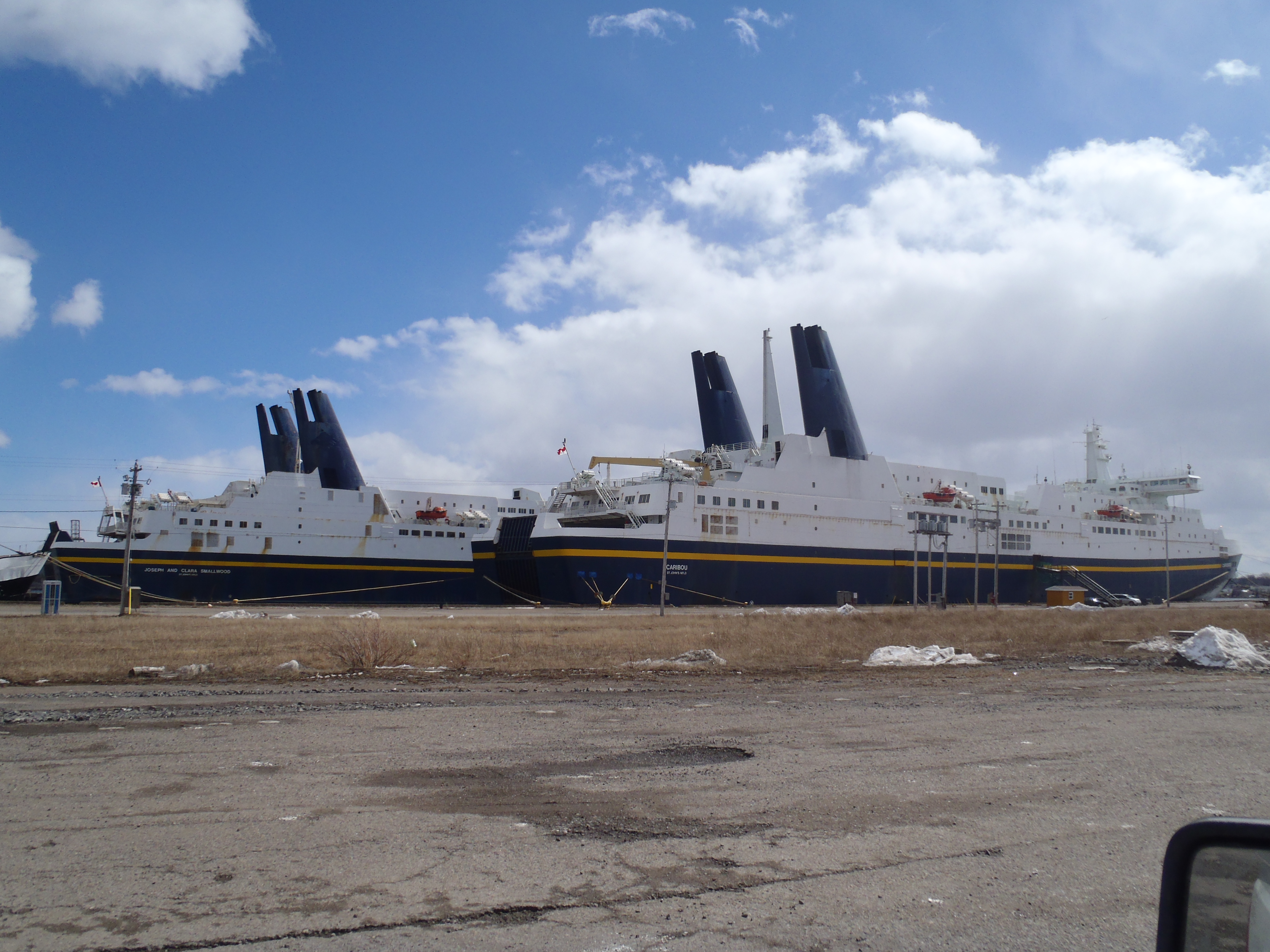
Caribou and Joseph and Clara Smallwood laid up at Sydport in Edwardsville, Nova Scotia in March 2011.

After Joseph and Clara Smallwood replaced MV Ambrose Shea in 1989, the North Sydney-Argentia crossing was reduced from 18 hours to a 14-hour schedule. During the fall, winter and spring seasons, Joseph and Clara Smallwood joined her sister ship Caribou, along with MV Leif Ericson on Marine Atlantic's 178 km (96 nmi) primary route between North Sydney, Nova Scotia and Channel-Port aux Basques, Newfoundland and Labrador. Joseph and Clara Smallwood was retired in March 2011, to make way for MV Blue Puttees and MV Highlanders which were on a five-year charter from Stena Line.

== Sale ==
On August 11, 2011, it was announced that Joseph and Clara Smallwood had been sold to Merrion Navigation S.A. of the Marshall Islands. Her name was shortened to Smallwood and she sailed to Alang, India and was scrapped along with her elder sister Caribou.
