= MV Leif Ericson =

Marine Atlantic ferry

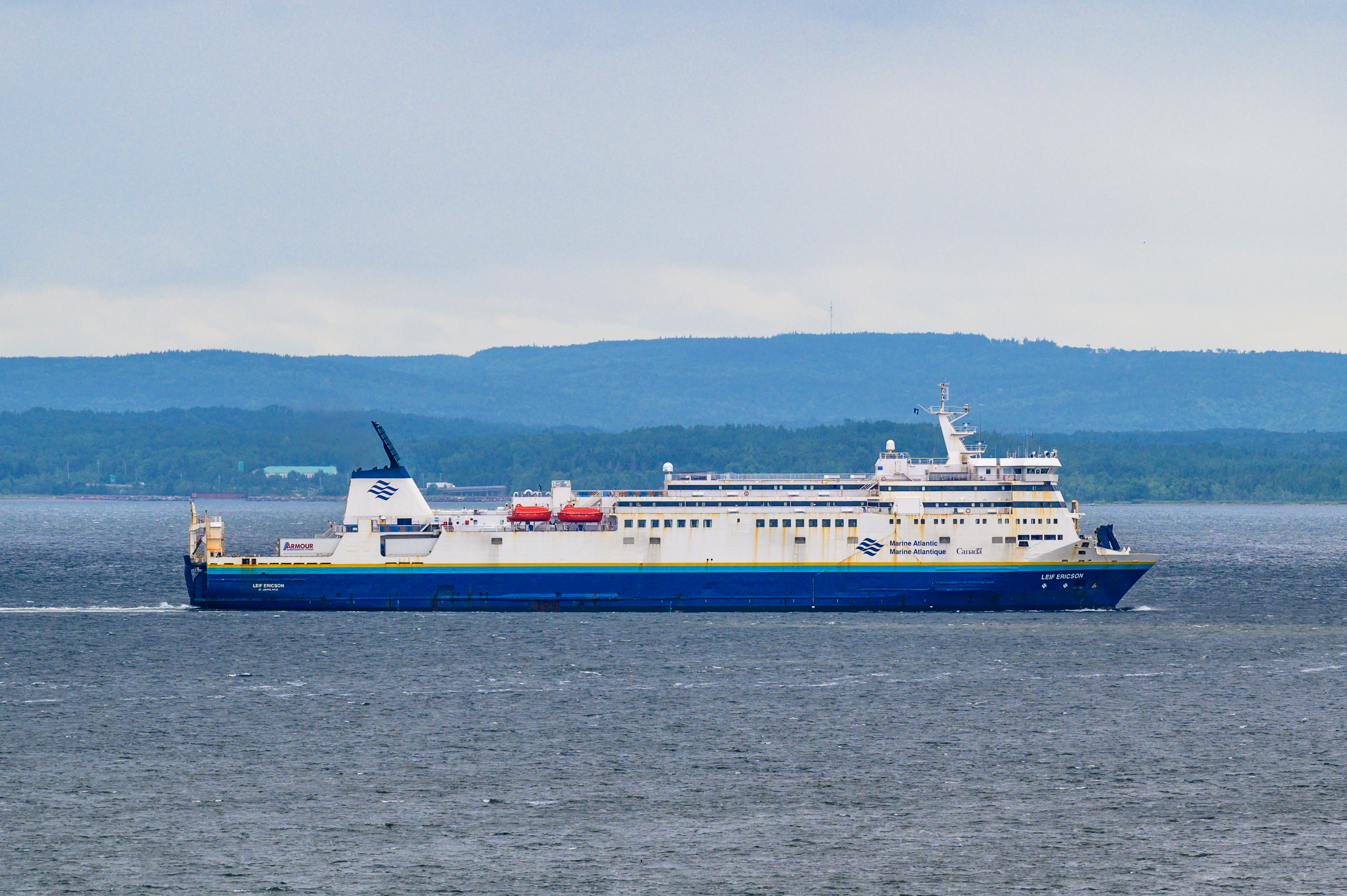
- Leif Ericson

History
- Name: 1991–2001: Stena Challenger; 2001–present: Leif Ericson
- Operator: 1991–1995: Stena Sealink Line; 1995–2001: Stena Line; 2001–present: Marine Atlantic
- Port of registry: 1991–2001: Dover, (United Kingdom); 2001–present St Johns, (Canada)
- Builder: Fosen Yard, Rissa Municipality, Norway
- Yard number: 50
- Laid down: 13 March 1990
- Launched: 4 October 1990
- Completed: 1 May 1991
- Identification: IMO number: 8917388; Call sign: VOCJ
- Status: In service

General characteristics
- Tonnage: 18,523 GT; 5,556 NT; 4,598 DWT
- Length: LOA 158 m (518 ft 4 in); LBP 142 m (465 ft 11 in)
- Beam: 24.3 m (79 ft 9 in)
- Draught: 7.9 m (25 ft 11 in)
- Depth: 13.2 m (43 ft 4 in)
- Ice class: DNV ICE-1B
- Installed power: 2 × Sulzer 8 ZAL40S diesels
- Propulsion: 2 × controllable pitch propellers
- Speed: 18 knots (33 km/h; 21 mph)
- Capacity: 500 passengers; 1550 lane meters

MV Leif Ericson is a commercial passenger/vehicle ferry in service with the Canadian operator Marine Atlantic. She is currently the oldest vessel in the Marine Atlantic fleet. She was built along with two sister ships by the Fosen Yard, Norway in the early 1990s. These two are Oslofjord and Patria Seaways. She also has two half sisters in Gryf and Lider Express. Leif Ericson and Patria Seaways were originally owned by the Swedish Company Stena Line as their Stena Challenger and Stena Traveller respectively.

== Vessel specifications ==
The vessel has a capacity of 500 passengers and 300 passenger vehicles (combination of automobiles and tractor trailers). She usually operates carrying commercial vehicles only on the North Sydney–Port aux Basques route. Passenger traffic on the North Sydney-Port aux Basques route is usually handled by Blue Puttees and Highlanders year-round, and Ala'suinu services the North Sydney–Argentia route three times per week from mid-June to late-September.

== Stena ==
The vessel was built at Fosen Yard, Norway in 1990 as Stena Challenger for Stena Line. She originally operated across the English Channel between Dover, England, and Calais, France, and also operated for a while in freight only mode on Sealink Stena Line's roll-on/roll-off freight service to Dunkirk alongside SNCF's train ferry Nord-pas-de-Calais. On 19 September 1995 Stena Challenger ran aground on Blériot Plage whilst waiting to enter the port of Calais.

== Marine Atlantic ==
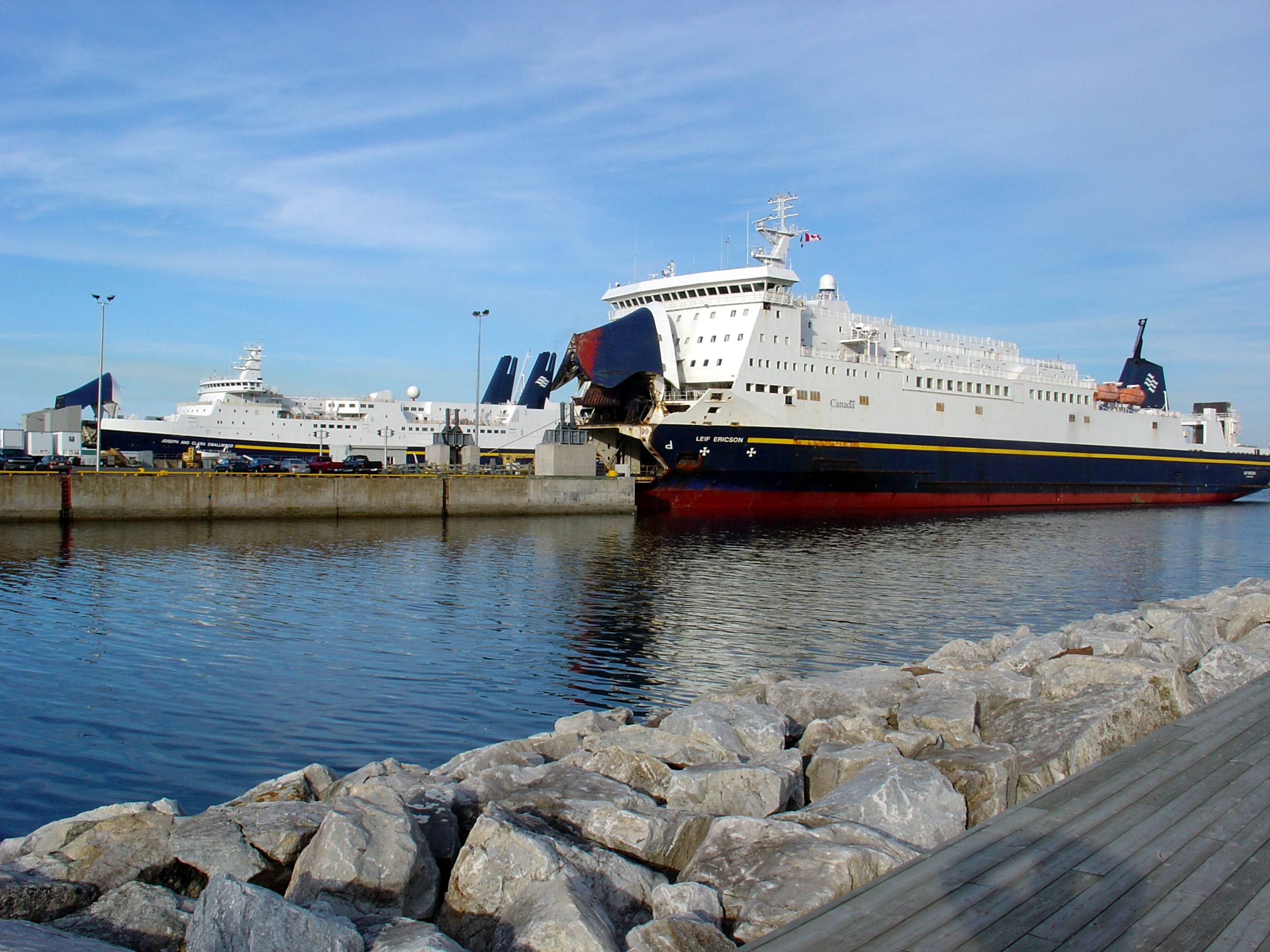
Leif Ericson in her original Marine Atlantic livery

The vessel was purchased by the Government of Canada for its Crown corporation Marine Atlantic in 2001 and underwent modifications in preparation for operating the 178-kilometre (111 mi) route between North Sydney, Nova Scotia and Port aux Basques, Newfoundland & Labrador. She was renamed Leif Ericson in honour of the 1,000th anniversary of Leif Ericson's settlement in Newfoundland, reportedly the first European to set foot in the New World.

On 26 October 2006 Leif Ericson collided with a concrete structure at Port aux Basques after losing power.

In June 2010, Marine Atlantic announced an extensive midlife refit of approximately $18 million over the next twelve months for Leif Ericson.
