= Baltic Shipyard =

Shipyard in Saint Petersburg, Russia

Coordinates: 59°55′53″N 30°15′29″E

- Company type: Open joint-stock company
- Industry: Shipbuilding
- Founded: 1856
- Headquarters: Vasilyevsky Island, Saint Petersburg, Russia
- Revenue: $166 million (2017)
- Operating income: −$2.58 million (2017)
- Net income: $45.9 million (2017)
- Total assets: $1.82 billion (2017)
- Total equity: $41.8 million (2017)
- Parent: United Shipbuilding Corporation
- Website: www.bz.ru

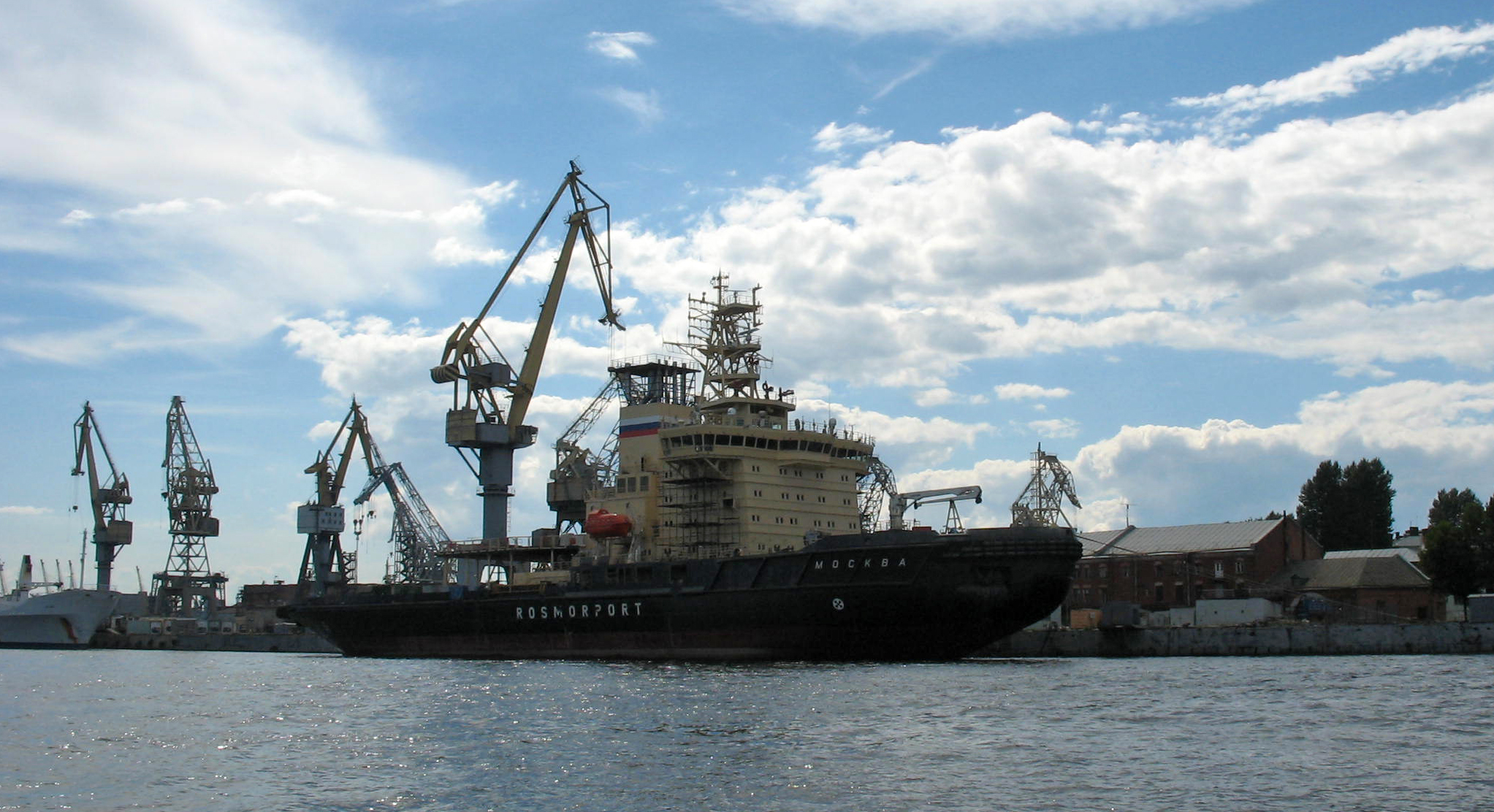
Icebreaker Moskva during the final stage of construction on the Baltic Shipyard, 2008

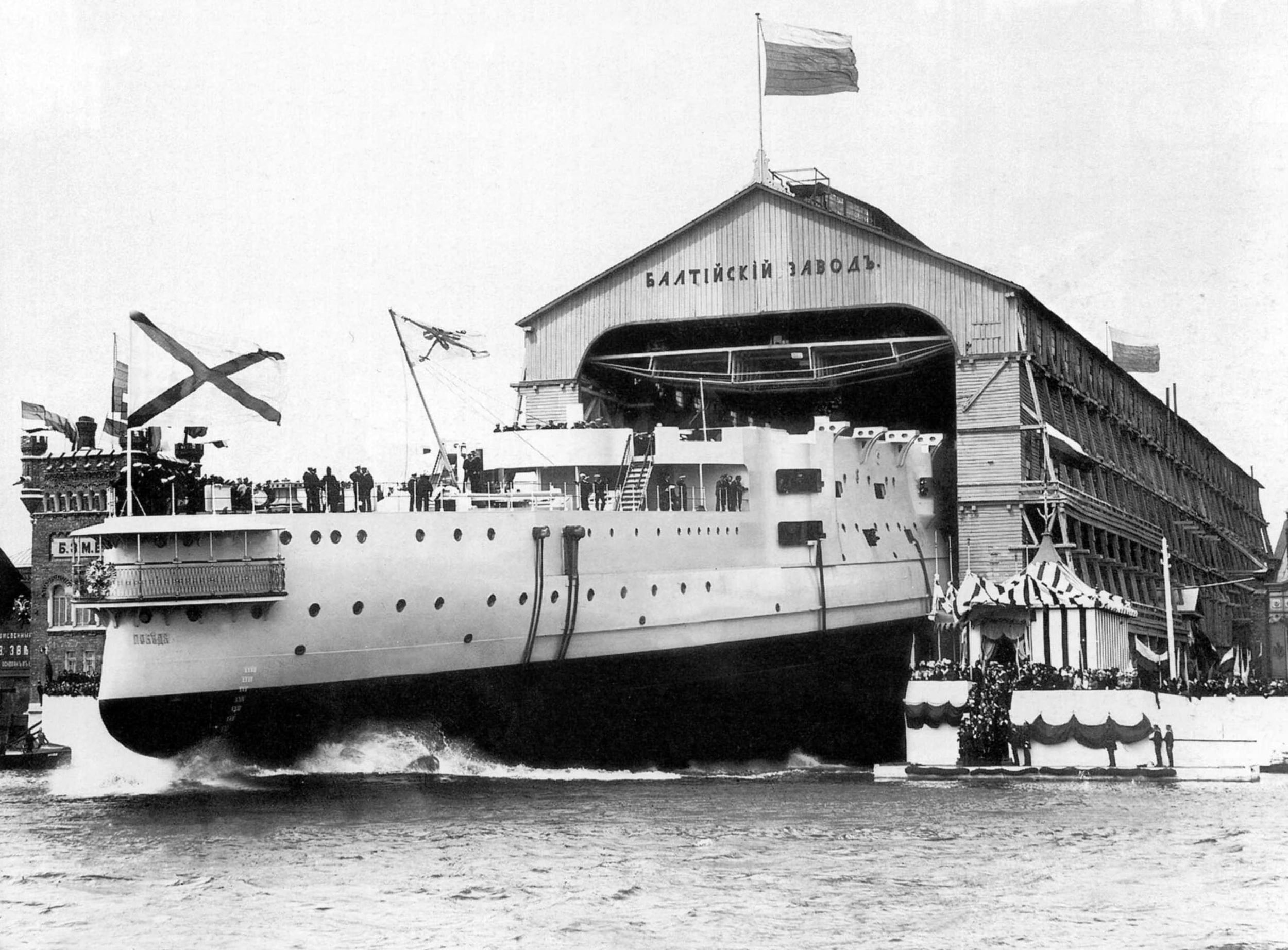
May 1900: Launch of the battleship Pobeda (Victory) on the Baltic Shipyard

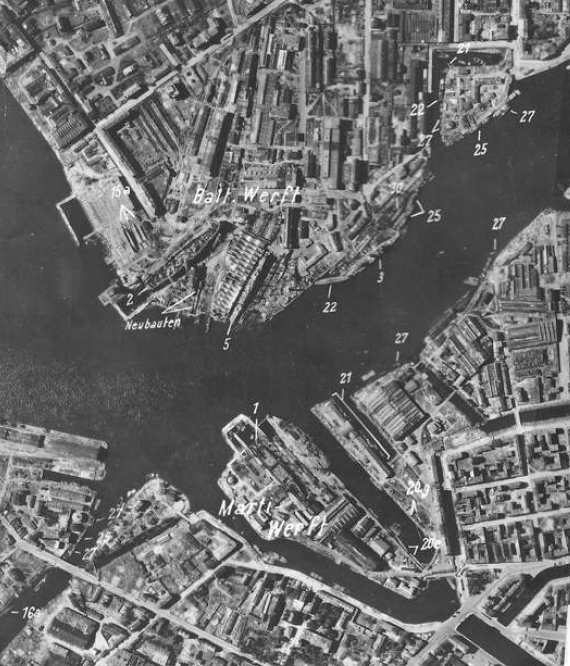
Luftwaffe aerial reconnaissance photo of the Ordzhonikidze and Marti (No. 194) Shipyards in Leningrad

The OJSC Baltic Shipyard (Baltiysky Zavod, formerly Shipyard 189 named after Grigoriy Ordzhonikidze) (Russian: Балтийский завод имени С. Орджоникидзе) is one of the oldest shipyards in Russia and is part of United Shipbuilding Corporation today.

It is located in Saint Petersburg in the south-western part of Vasilievsky Island. It is one of the three shipyards active in Saint Petersburg. Together with the Admiralty Shipyard it has been responsible for building many Imperial Russian battleships as well as Soviet nuclear-powered icebreakers. Currently it specializes in merchant ships while the Admiralty yard specializes in diesel-electric submarines. In addition, it is responsible for construction of Russian floating nuclear power stations.

== History ==
The shipyard was founded in 1856 by the St. Petersburg merchant M. Carr and the Scotsman Murdoch. L. MacPherson. It subsequently became the Carr and MacPherson yard. In 1864 it built two monitors of the Uragan class. In 1874 the shipyard was sold to Prince Ochtomski.

In 1934 the shipyard started work on the three prototypes for the S-class submarine, based on a German design produced by the Dutch company Ingenieurskantoor voor Scheepsbouw. The Soviets renamed the shipyard Zavod 189 'im. Sergo Ordzhonikidze' on 30 December 1936.

At the time of the collapse of Vladimir Vinogradov's Inkombank during the 1998 Financial crisis, Inkombank held a 16% stake in Baltic Shipyard.

=== 21st century ===
Nowadays the shipyard manufactures warships, large tonnage cargo and ice-class vessels. As of 2021, it employs more than 6000 people. It has built more than 600 vessels.

In 2011 the shipyard came under control of JSC United Shipbuilding Corporation (USC), its vice-president Valery Venkov took the CEO post.

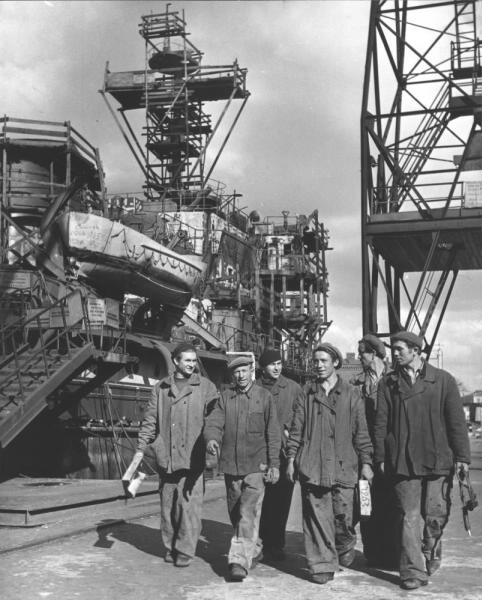
Workers of the shipyard arriving for their shift, 1952

In the mid-2010s the shipyard launched a series of Project 22220, the largest and most powerful nuclear-powered ice-breakers designed to ensure year-round navigation in the western Arctic. In June 2016, nuclear icebreaker Arktika was launched. On September 22, 2017, Sibir was floated out. On May 25, 2019, the 173 metre-long nuclear-powered arctic ice breaker Ural had its ceremonial launch. The technical laying of the fourth vessel, named Yakutia, took place on May 26, 2020.

== See also ==
- MV Highlanders and MV Blue Puttees are ferries with Marine Atlantic built mostly in this shipyard and final assembly at Fosen Mekaniske Verksteder (Fosen Yards) in Rissa, Norway
- Peresvet-class battleship
- Borodino-class battleship
- Borodino-class battlecruiser
- Andrei Pervozvanny-class battleship
- Gangut-class battleship
- Kronshtadt-class battlecruiser
- Sverdlov-class cruiser
- Russian battlecruiser Petr Velikiy
- Taimyr-class nuclear icebreaker
- Dekabrist-class submarine
- Baltijos Laivų Statykla in Lithuania
- Arktika-class icebreaker
- Admiralty Shipyard
- Severnaya Verf
- Russian floating nuclear power station
