= Freshwater, Placentia Bay, Newfoundland and Labrador =

Coordinates: 47.259°N 53.983°W

Location of Freshwater, Placentia in Newfoundland and Labrador

Freshwater is a neighbourhood in located in Placentia, Newfoundland and Labrador. Placentia was originally settled by the French in the 1630s that fishing settlement was called Petit Plaisance, meaning "Pleasant Little Place". The name was retained in English (Little Placentia) when the French lost control of the area following the Treaty of Utrecht in 1713.

== World War II ==
Some residents of Argentia and Marquise—who were displaced when the land under their villages was traded to the United States under "Lend-lease" for construction of a military base under the Destroyers for Bases Agreement—resettled in Freshwater.
