= SS Caribou =

WWII Ship and Sinking Event

Coordinates: 47°19′N 59°29′W

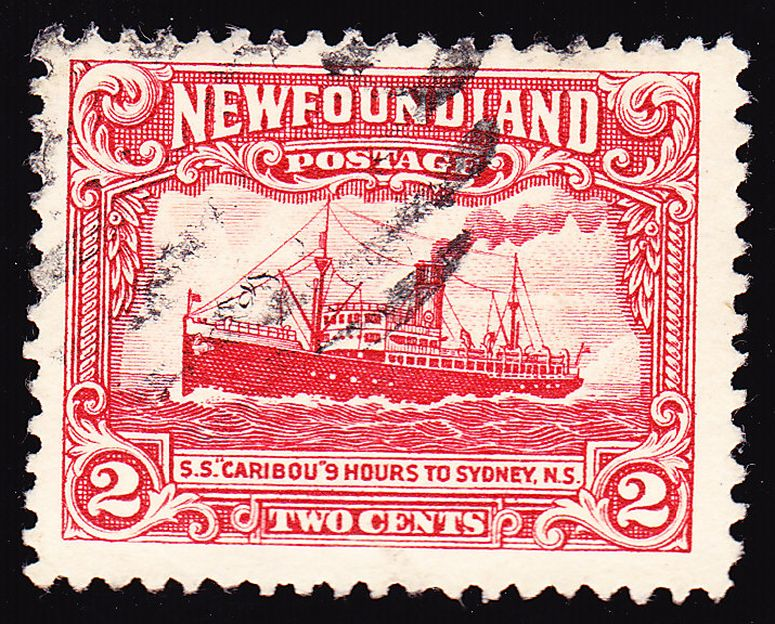
- Stamp depicting SS Caribou

History
- Name: Caribou
- Owner: Newfoundland Railway
- Route: Port aux Basques, Newfoundland to North Sydney, Nova Scotia
- Ordered: 1925
- Builder: Goodwin - Hamilton S. Adams Ltd. Rotterdam, Netherlands
- Launched: Schiedam Netherlands 9 June 1925
- In service: 1928–1942
- Out of service: 14 October 1942
- Fate: Sunk by German U-boat in the Gulf of St. Lawrence, 14 October 1942

General characteristics
- Tonnage: 2,200 long tons (2,200 t)
- Length: 265 ft (81 m)
- Speed: 14.5 knots (26.9 km/h; 16.7 mph)
- Capacity: 3,000 hp (2,200 kW)
- Crew: 46
- Notes: Information about ship specifications from Gibbons (2006)

SS Caribou was a Newfoundland Railway passenger ferry that ran between Port aux Basques, in the Dominion of Newfoundland, and North Sydney, Nova Scotia between 1928 and 1942. During the Battle of the St. Lawrence the ferry participated in thrice-weekly convoys between Nova Scotia and Newfoundland. The German submarine U-69 attacked the convoy on 14 October 1942 and Caribou was sunk. She had women and children on board, and many of them were among the 137 who died. Her sinking, and large death toll, made it clear that the war had really arrived on Canada's and Newfoundland's home front. Her sinking is cited by many historians as the most significant sinking in Canadian-controlled waters during the Second World War.

== Construction ==
Caribou was built in 1925 at Rotterdam, the Netherlands, for the Newfoundland Railway. Launched in 1925, she produced 3,000 horsepower (2,200 kW) and was able to reach a speed of 14.5 knots (26.9 km/h; 16.7 mph) when fully loaded. She also had steam-heat and electric lights in all of her cabins, which were a luxury at the time. Also, due to her ice-breaking design, Caribou also assisted during the seal hunt along the Newfoundland coast each spring.

== Sinking ==
Site where Caribou sank in the Gulf of St. Lawrence, 14 October 1942.

On 13 October 1942, Caribou was part of the Sydney-Port aux Basques (SPAB) convoy, organized by the Royal Canadian Navy base HMCS Protector. The SPAB series of convoys usually occurred three times a week, and was carried out in darkness. HMCS Grandmère, a Bangor-class minesweeper was the naval escort vessel on this ill-fated voyage.

The German submarine U-69 was also patrolling the Gulf of St. Lawrence. It was a dark evening, and the heavy smoke from Caribou's coal-fired steam boilers silhouetted her against the nighttime horizon. At 3:51 a.m. Newfoundland Summer Time, on 14 October 1942, she was torpedoed approximately 20 nautical miles (37 km; 23 mi) southwest of Port aux Basques and sank five minutes later. Grandmère spotted the submarine and tried to ram her, but, U-69 quickly submerged. Over the next two hours, the minesweeper launched six depth charges, but did not damage the submarine, and U-69 crept away into the Atlantic undetected. Following procedure, Grandmère then went back for survivors. In the days after the sinking, the Canadian naval vessel was criticized in the Sydney Post-Record and The Globe and Mail – as well as other media outlets – for not immediately stopping and helping save survivors; but that was against operating procedures, and would have placed the minesweeper in immediate danger of being sunk as well. After picking up survivors, Grandmère sailed for Sydney because it had better hospital facilities than Port aux Basques.

Caribou was carrying 46 crew members and 191 civilian and military passengers. The ship's longtime captain, Benjamin Tavernor, was commanding the ship as she was struck, and perished along with his sons Stanley and Harold, who served as first and third officers respectively. Of the deceased, two were rescued at first, but they later died from exposure to the cold water. 137 people died that morning, and the passenger and crew totals were broken down as follows: of 118 military personnel, 57 died; of 73 civilians, 49 died; of the 46 crew members, 31 died. 34 bodies were found and brought to Port aux Basques by fishing schooners chartered by the Newfoundland Railway Company. To prevent rumours, the Royal Canadian Navy allowed the Sydney Post-Record and other media outlets to report the sinking, almost as soon as it happened, one of the few times that war censorship was temporarily lifted in this period. The sinking made front-page news in both The Toronto Daily Star and The Globe and Mail newspapers later that week.

== Memorialized ==
In 1986, the CN Marine/Marine Atlantic ferry MV Caribou was named after SS Caribou. She plied the same route as the original ferry, travelling between North Sydney and Port aux Basques. On her maiden voyage, 12 May 1986, the ship stopped at the location where its predecessor sank. At approximately 5:30 a.m., survivor Mack Piercey, one of 13 survivors on board for the occasion, tossed a poppy-laden memorial wreath into the ocean and then the ship continued on to Port aux Basques to complete the voyage.

In 2014, as part of a special dedication service in the town of Port Hawkesbury's Veterans Memorial Park, SS Caribou's passengers and crew were honoured. Part of the dedication service included the unveiling of the anchor from the decommissioned MV Caribou as a new feature for the memorial.

The Canadian Government announced that their new Arctic/Offshore Patrol Ship (AOPS) HMCS Margaret Brooke was being named for a Royal Canadian Navy Nursing Sister who was decorated for her bravery during the sinking of Caribou.

== Popular culture ==
- Caribou was featured on a 2¢ Newfoundland postage stamp in 1926.
- In the Canadian series Bomb Girls, Caribou is mentioned to have sunk the previous day which gave the people of the home front a shock.
