= MV William Carson =

Former CN Marine passenger/vehicle icebreaker ferry

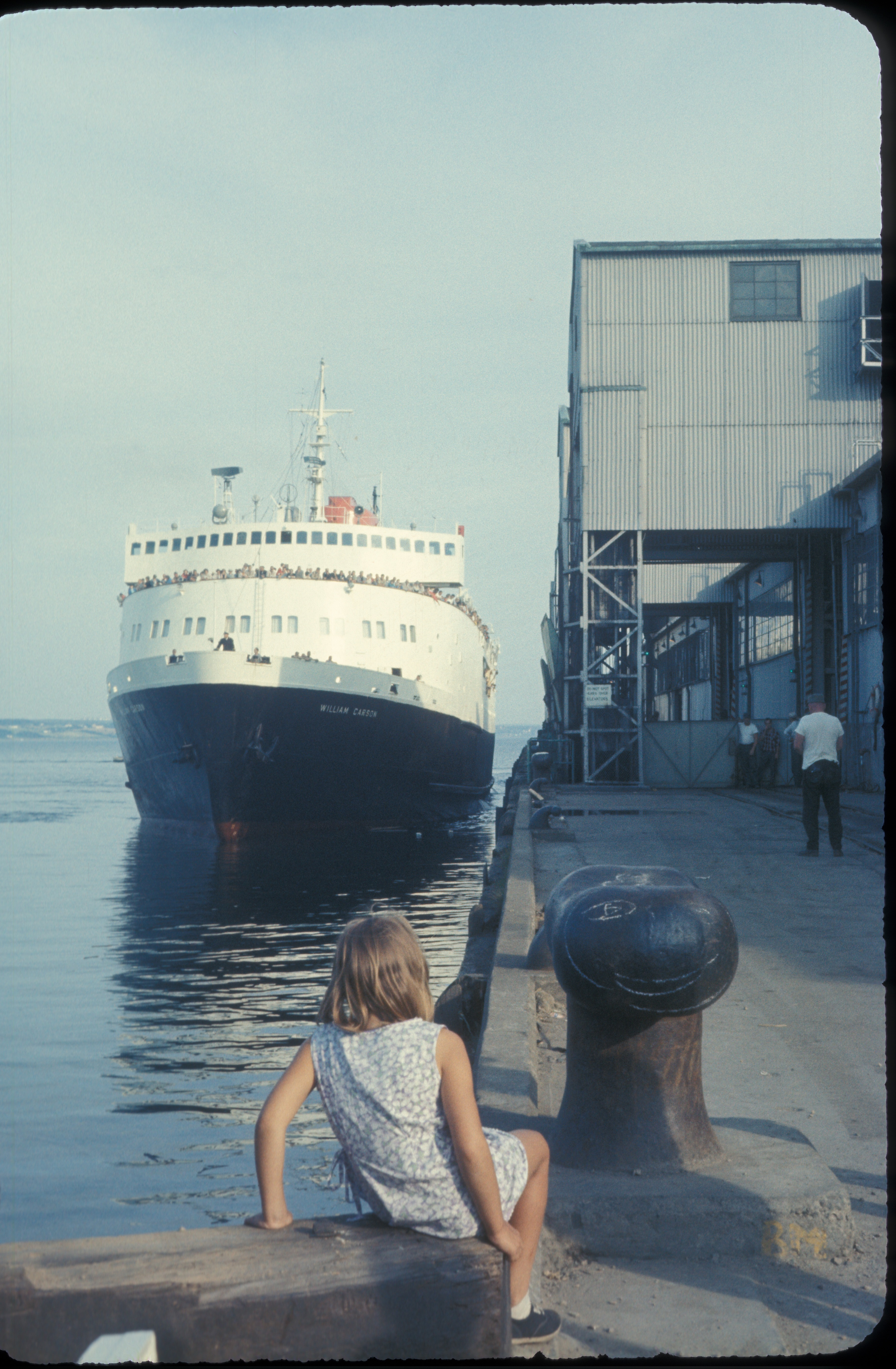
William Carson in service between Port aux Basques and North Sydney in October 1971.

M/V William Carson was a CN Marine passenger/vehicle icebreaker ferry named in honour of Newfoundland colonial politician William Carson.

Built by Canadian Vickers Ltd. in Montreal, Quebec, Canada, William Carson measured 351 feet (107 m) in length and displaced 8,300 tons. Primarily a freight/cargo ferry, she had a capacity for 260 passengers and 60 cars which were loaded through a side ramp.

Designed for service between Port aux Basques and North Sydney, Nova Scotia by Canadian National Railways, she was commissioned in 1955. One of the largest vessels built in Canada at the time, her large size forced her to use the more spacious harbour at Argentia for her first three years in service while the Port aux Basques harbour was modified to accept her.

William Carson was reassigned to the seasonal Labrador coastal service in 1976, operating between Lewisporte and Happy Valley-Goose Bay.

== Sinking ==
In 1977, early in only the second season on the Labrador run, William Carson sank in 500 feet (150 m) of water on the night of 2 June / morning of 3 June 1977 after striking a small iceberg while navigating 12 nautical miles (22 km) off Battle Harbour. All 129 passengers and 29 crew aboard at the time survived.

The evacuation was carried out efficiently and passengers and crew waited in lifeboats in the icefield while watching their ship sink. Canadian Coast Guard icebreakers and Canadian Forces helicopters were dispatched to rescue the survivors. Most of the survivors were taken to St. John's, Newfoundland by military transport. However, the military was criticized in the Canadian House of Commons for taking three hours to send helicopters to rescue the survivors.
