= MV Vacationland =

Ferry

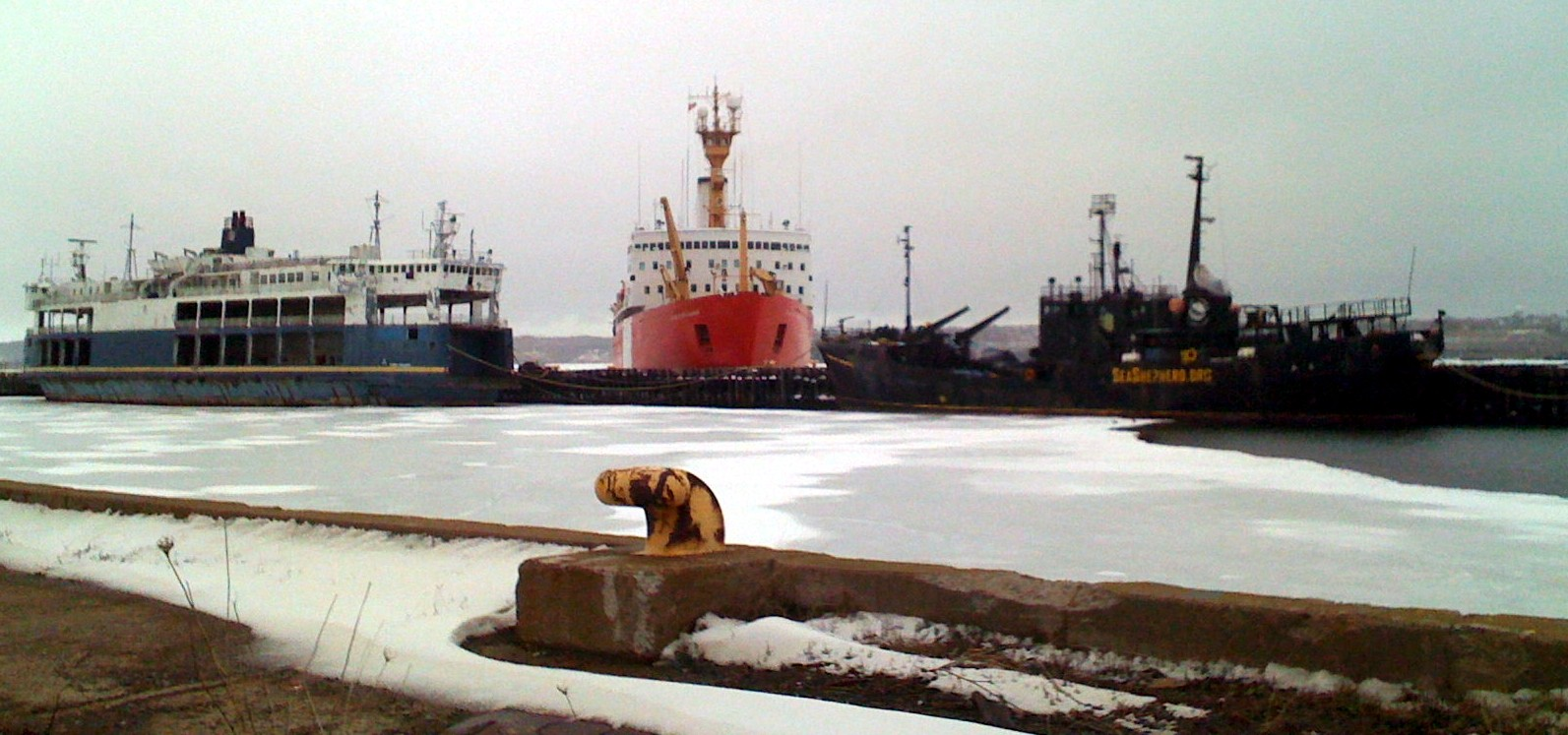
From left to right, MV Fundy Paradise (ex-MV Vacationland, CCGS Louis S. St-Laurent, and RV Farley Mowat in Point Edward, Nova Scotia (March 2009)

MV Vacationland is a Canadian RORO ferry that operated across the Northumberland Strait between the ports of Cape Tormentine, New Brunswick and Port Borden, Prince Edward Island.

Built in 1971 by the Government of Canada for Canadian National Railways (CNR) at Port Weller Dry Docks in St. Catharines, Ontario, Vacationland was designed for the sheltered waters of the Northumberland Strait; and as such her vehicle decks are open on both sides and she lacks a hurricane bow. She measures 99.06 metres (325 feet) in length, 20.9 metres (67 feet) in beam, and displaces 2775 tons. She has a capacity for 485 passengers and 155 vehicles or 16 tractor trailers. She is a sister ship to the MV Holiday Island. She is powered by two Ruston V-16 16CSVM Ruston diesel train engines that produce 3625 horsepower each giving a total of 7250 horsepower. Her propellers are of the Voith-Schnieder Cycloidal design which are located in the bow and stern of the ship. They are variable pitch that turn opposite one another that propels the ship and steers it as well. The table diameter that the blades are housed in is 14.5 feet. Her sister ship the MV Holiday Island has the same propulsion machinery and main engines.

The MV Vacationland had her sea trials at Port Weller Drydocks in mid April 1971 and her sister ship MV Holiday Island had her sea trials during the first week of April 1971. Their keels were laid at the Port Weller Drydock in November 1969. The MV Vacationland entered service on the Cape Tormentine-Borden run after the MV Holiday Island which had arrived the week before her in May 1971.

CNR changed the name of its ferry services to CN Marine in 1977 and then to Marine Atlantic in 1986. The opening of the Confederation Bridge on June 1, 1997 saw Marine Atlantic close its ferry service and all of its vessels on this route except Holiday Island were disposed and sold off by the Crown Assets division of the Department of Public Works and Government Services.

Vacationland's sister ship Holiday Island sailed 100 kilometres to the east end of the strait and began service that month under the colours of Northumberland Ferries Ltd., however Vacationland sailed to Sydney, Nova Scotia and help haul cargo from the Marine Atlantic Borden terminal and was stored there until being sold in 1998 to the Government of New Brunswick.

Upon her purchase by the Government of New Brunswick Vacationland was renamed MV Fundy Paradise with the intention of using her for service between Blacks Harbour and Grand Manan Island. Funding for making modifications to the docks at both terminals for accepting the ship was never approved and she was towed to the Steel and Engine Products Ltd. shipyard in Liverpool, Nova Scotia where she was mothballed until the Government of New Brunswick decided to dispose of her in 2001.

Fundy Paradise was towed back to Sydney from Liverpool and remained docked at Sydport while listed for sale until 2005 when she was sold to a company from Quebec City. In summer 2009, she was towed from Sydney to Trois-Rivières where she is undergoing a major refit and conversion for rock and sand transportation on the Saint Lawrence River.
