= Channel Head Lighthouse =

Lighthouse in Newfoundland and Labrador, Canada

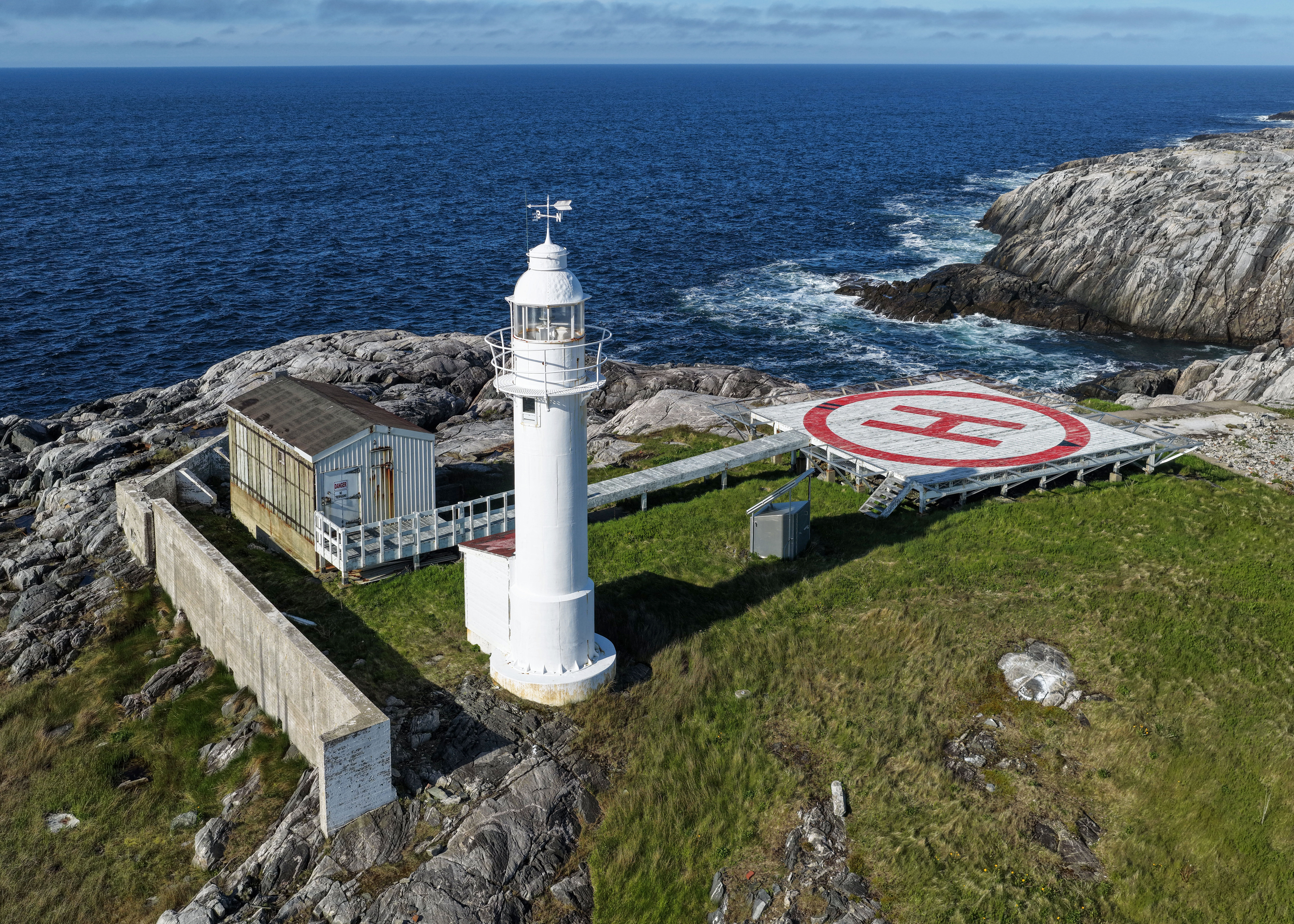
- Channel Head Lighthouse in 2026
- Location: Channel Head, Channel-Port aux Basques, Newfoundland and Labrador, Canada
- Coordinates: 47°33′57.0″N 59°07′24.6″W
- Constructed: 1875 (first); 1895 (current)
- Construction: Wooden tower (first); cast-iron tower (current)
- Shape: Square tower (first); Cylindrical tower with balcony and lantern (current)
- Markings: White tower
- Operator: Canadian Coast Guard
- Heritage: Recognized Federal Heritage Building
- Racon: C (- . - .), X and S bands

Light
- Focal height: 29 m (95 ft)
- Range: 17 nmi (31 km; 20 mi)
- Characteristic: Fl W 10s.

Channel Head Lighthouse is an active lighthouse at the entrance to the harbour of Channel-Port aux Basques, Newfoundland and Labrador, Canada. A light station was established at Channel Head in 1875. The present cast-iron tower was built in 1895, replacing the original wooden lighthouse. The tower was designated a Recognized Federal Heritage Building in 1988.

Work on the first lighthouse began in 1874, and the light entered service the following spring. The original lighthouse was a 9-metre (30 ft) square wooden tower showing a fixed red light. It was replaced in 1895 by a circular iron tower equipped with a fourth-order lens. A fog signal station was added in 1898, as Port aux Basques developed as the western terminus of the Newfoundland Railway and a ferry port. The current light flashes white every ten seconds from a focal height of 29 metres (95 ft) and has a nominal range of 17 nautical miles (31 km; 20 mi). The station also carries a RACON transmitting Morse code C on X and S bands.

== See also ==
- List of lighthouses in Newfoundland and Labrador
- List of lighthouses in Canada
