= Grand Bay (Newfoundland and Labrador) =

Grand Bay (47°35′35″N 59°10′29″W NST) is a bay to the west of Channel-Port aux Basques, Newfoundland, Canada. Two communities line the bay, on the east is Grand Bay East and on the west is Grand Bay West.

Grand Bay first appeared on Captain James Cook's 1766 chart of the south coast of Newfoundland. It was the landing place for Micmac and French groups who crossed the Cabot Strait in the early 18th century in contravention of the terms of the Treaty of Utrecht (1713).

Kettle and Lomond were common surnames among the settlers in the Grand Bay area; among them is Wilson Kettle, who was entered in the Guinness World Records as having the largest number of living descendants.
