= Marine Atlantic =

Independent Canadian federal Crown corporation operating ferries

- Type: Crown corporation
- Industry: Transportation
- Founded: Moncton, New Brunswick (1986)
- Headquarters: St. John's, Newfoundland and Labrador, Canada
- Key people: Murray Hupman, President & CEO
- Products: Ferry service
- Revenue: Can$112.62 million in 2017-2018
- Website: www.marineatlantic.ca

Marine Atlantic route map

Marine Atlantic Inc. (French: Marine Atlantique) is an independent Canadian federal Crown corporation which is mandated to operate ferry services between the provinces of Newfoundland and Labrador and Nova Scotia.

Marine Atlantic's corporate headquarters are in St. John's, Newfoundland and Labrador.

== Current operations ==
Marine Atlantic operates ferries across the Cabot Strait on two routes:

- North Sydney, Nova Scotia, and Port aux Basques, Newfoundland and Labrador
- North Sydney, Nova Scotia, and Argentia, Newfoundland and Labrador

The 96-nautical-mile (178 km) Port aux Basques route is operated year-round. This service was assumed by Canadian National Railway in 1949 from the Newfoundland Railway when the Dominion of Newfoundland entered into Canadian Confederation.

The 280-nautical-mile (520 km) Argentia, Placentia route is operated seasonally during the summer (June–September). This service was established by CNR in 1967. As a result of the 2020 COVID-19 pandemic, the Argentia, Placentia service was suspended for that year on May 8, 2020.

== History of Newfoundland ferry services ==
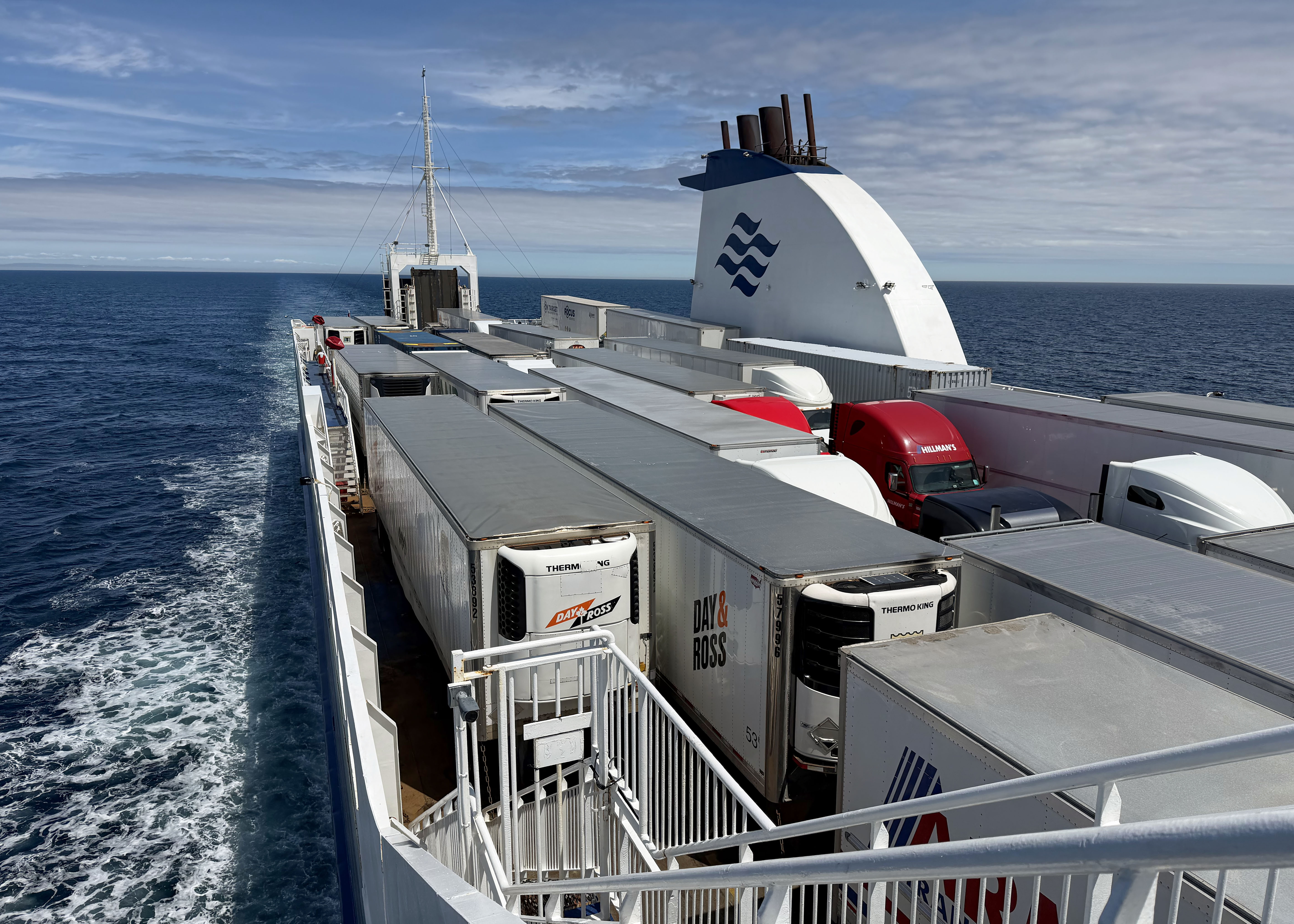
Vehicle deck of MV Blue Puttees during a crossing from Newfoundland to Nova Scotia.

From 1851, when the Colony of Newfoundland took over the operation of the post office, the government contracted for packet boats. By 1860 subsidized schooners were operating on the northeast coast from Greenspond to New Perlican, and along the south coast from Placentia to Channel-Port aux Basques. The first steam-packet, Lady LeMarchant, operated on Conception Bay after 1852.

In 1860 the government decided to subsidize a regularly scheduled steamer service. The first vessel chartered to the service was Victoria in 1862. In 1863, Ariel took over, alternating a northern run to Twillingate (later extended to Tilt Cove) with a southern run to LaPoile. In 1871 Grieve and Co. replaced Ariel with Leopard and Tiger, inaugurating northern and southern runs based at St. John's, to Battle Harbour in the north, and to Halifax in the south. After 1877 the two-steamer coastal service continued with Bowring Brothers' Curlew and Plover, while Lady Glover ran in Conception Bay. In 1888 Harvey & Co. took over the service, with Conscript (on the northern service) and Volunteer. The packet Hercules, later Alert, began running in Placentia Bay, while Favourite ran in Trinity Bay and Lady Glover in Notre Dame Bay. Once the railway reached Harbour Grace there was no need for a steam-packet on Conception Bay. After Volunteer was lost in 1891, Harvey's commissioned Grand Lake and renamed Conscript to Virginia Lake. Meanwhile, Farquhar's Harlaw served western Newfoundland, out of Halifax.

With its completion of the Newfoundland Railway in 1898 and following its agreement with the Newfoundland Government, the Reid Newfoundland Company under Robert G. Reid began operating coastal and ferry services for the island and Labrador, to be integrated with the railway. By 1900 they comprised a fleet of eight vessels known as the Alphabet Fleet. Each vessel in the Alphabet Fleet was built in Scotland and given the name of a Scottish location by the Reids, who were from Scotland.

In 1904, in response to complaints about the Reid service, the Newfoundland government subsidized the use of two outside vessels for the coastal service, the Portia and Prospero, and in 1912, set up a similar arrangement for use of the Sagona and Fogota.

In 1923, under the Railway Settlement Act, the government took over the island's railway. They purchased the Alphabet Fleet from the Reids and placed it under the railway's control. In 1924, Portia, Prospero and Sagona were purchased outright, and another vessel, Malakoff, was brought into service. In 1925, SS Caribou began her service on the Gulf run.

The Newfoundland Royal Commission, formed in 1933 by the government of the UK to examine the future of Newfoundland in light of its then financial difficulties, examined the operation of ferries as part of its investigation. It recommended that an expert inquiry be held into the ferry services with a view particularly to the prevention of overlapping, more efficient and economical working and the readjustment of freight rates on a carefully planned and scientific basis.

After Newfoundland joined Confederation in 1949, the Newfoundland Railway and its ferry services became part of the Canadian National Railway.

In 1977, CN's marine operations in Atlantic Canada were passed to a subsidiary, CN Marine.

== Formation of Marine Atlantic ==
Marine Atlantic was established in 1986 to take over the provision of ferry services in Atlantic Canada which had previously been operated by CN Marine, a subsidiary of Canadian National Railway. Its headquarters were in Moncton, New Brunswick.

Extensive budget cuts by the Government of Canada during the latter part of the 1990s led to a drastic downsizing of Marine Atlantic's operations, precipitated by the 1997 opening of the Confederation Bridge which replaced Marine Atlantic's most heavily used ferry service, the constitutionally-mandated ferry to Prince Edward Island.

Later in 1997, the company transferred the operation of its Bay of Fundy and Gulf of Maine ferry services between Saint John, New Brunswick-Digby, Nova Scotia, and Yarmouth, Nova Scotia-Bar Harbor, Maine, to the private-sector company Bay Ferries Limited, a subsidiary of Northumberland Ferries Limited.

That year also saw Marine Atlantic remove itself from the provision of coastal ferry services in Newfoundland and Labrador with the transfer of operations to the provincial government at the end of the 1997 shipping season. This agreement was reached between the federal and provincial governments in exchange for federal funding to extend regional roads such as the Trans-Labrador Highway to service coastal communities. These coastal ferry services had been initiated by the Newfoundland Railway and were assumed by Canadian National Railways, following the province's entry into Confederation in 1949, although they were not constitutionally mandated. Also in 1997 Marine Atlantic sold off its Newfoundland Dockyard, located in St. John's, Newfoundland to a private operator. The dockyard built in the 1880s was at one point in time owned by the Reid Newfoundland Company, then in 1923 was taken over by the Newfoundland Railway company. when Newfoundland joined Canada ownership passed to Canadian National.

In 1998, the company moved its headquarters from Moncton to St. John's, after briefly considering North Sydney and Port aux Basques, Newfoundland and Labrador.

In late 2004, the federal government announced the appointment of a three-member committee tasked with examining future operations of Marine Atlantic. One of the options that was reportedly considered included privatization, however the subsequent report called for improved service through fleet renewal, lower fares, increased frequency of crossings, and moving the headquarters to Port aux Basques.

In 2010, Marine Atlantic announced that the Canadian government was planning to invest around $900 million in the ferry operations. Two ferries, the MV Caribou and the MV Joseph and Clara Smallwood, were replaced by newer ships initially chartered from Stena Line. On land, all three terminals at Marine Atlantic's ports received extensive renovations, including the construction of a new terminal building at the North Sydney facility.

== Fleet ==
Ship	Built	Entered service	Gross tonnage	Length	Beam	Speed	Port of registry	Current status
MV Leif Ericson	1990	2001	18,523 GT	158 m	24.3 m	18 knots	St. John's	In service
MV Blue Puttees	2007	2011	28,460 GT	199.5 m	26.7 m	Unstated	St. John's	In service
MV Highlanders	2007	2011	28,460 GT	199.5 m	26.7 m	Unstated	St. John's	In service
MV Ala'suinu	2023	2024	37,807 GT	202.9 m	27.8 m	23 knots	St. John's	In service
MV Île Rouge	2001	2026	30,285 GT	203.3 m	25 m	30.4 knots	St. John's	On Order for Fall 2026

MV Leif Ericson, purchased in 2001, is a significantly smaller and lower-capacity ferry than other vessels in the fleet. Leif Ericson is 18,500 registered tons and 157 metres long, carrying 500 passengers, and 250 automobile-equivalent vehicles.

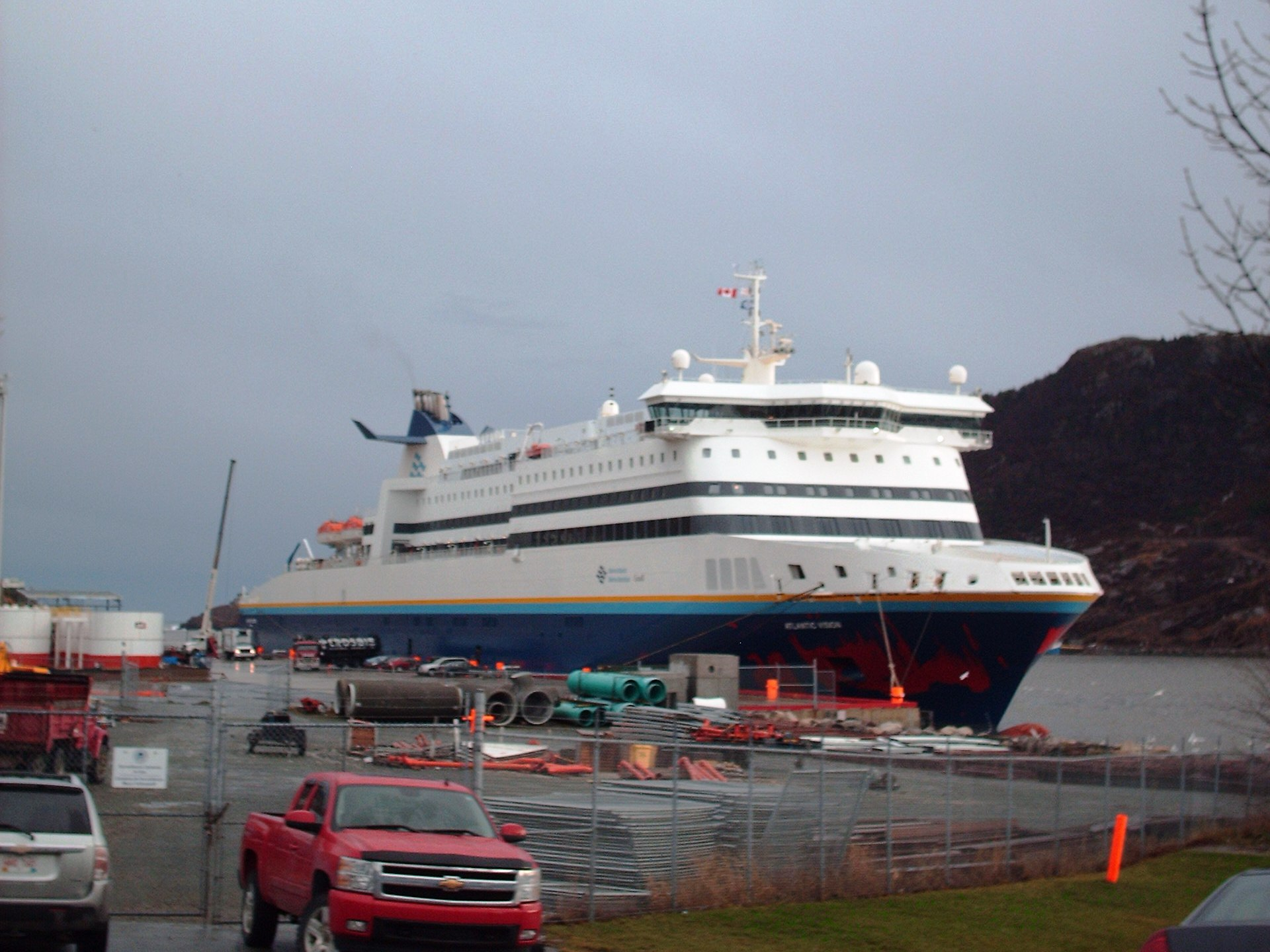
MV Atlantic Vision joined the fleet in 2008 on a five-year charter.

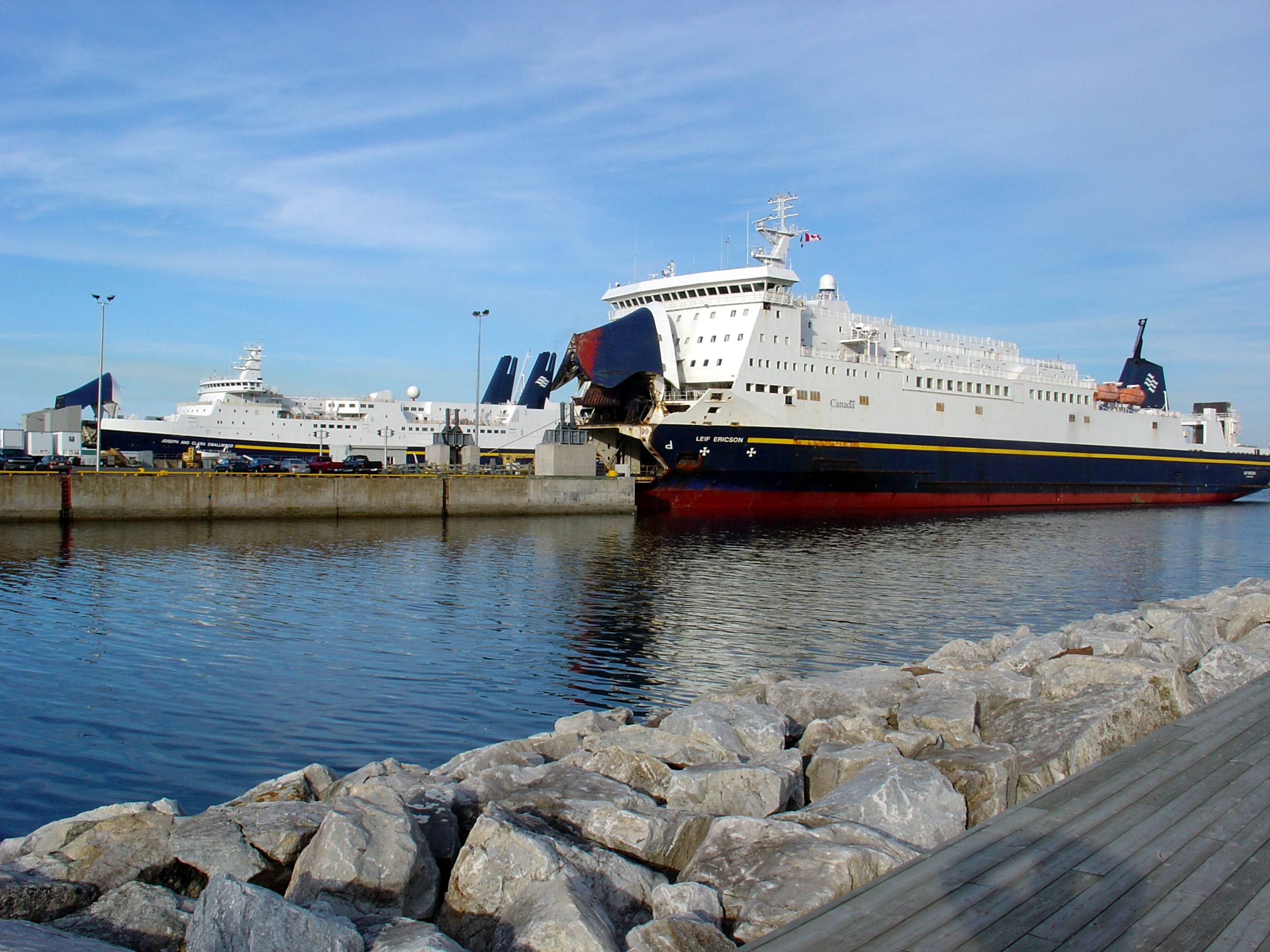
Marine Atlantic ferries Leif Ericson (right) and Joseph and Clara Smallwood.

MV Atlantic Vision was originally chartered from the Estonia-based Tallink for five years starting in October 2008; in February 2015, Marine Atlantic announced that the lease on the vessel had been renewed until November 2017 for a cost of Can$40 million. At 30,285 GT, Atlantic Vision was the largest ship in Marine Atlantic fleet and the largest ferry in North America.

On May 21, 2010, Marine Atlantic announced that the company had agreed to charter two vessels from the Stena Line to replace the aging "Gulfspan" class vessels MV Caribou and MV Joseph and Clara Smallwood. The new vessels, built in 2006 and 2007, boosted capacity and lowered operating costs, as they consumed less fuel. On September 29, 2010, Marine Atlantic announced the names of the new vessels: MV Blue Puttees and MV Highlanders. Blue Puttees went into service March 2011, with Highlanders following in April 2011. In May 2015, Marine Atlantic announced that it had purchased both vessels from Stena for Can$100 million each. In July 2021, Marine Atlantic ordered an E-Flexer on charter from Stena RoRo for five years. She will carry 1000 passengers and contain 2571 lane metres of vehicle space. MV Ala’suinu entered service in July 2024, and is capable of running on diesel, liquid natural gas or battery electric.

In January 2026, Marine Atlantic announced that it secured a five-year charter from Stena Line of an additional vessel. In March 2026 it was announced that the new vessel, a sister ship of Atlantic Vision, would be named Île Rouge. Following modifications, Île Rouge arrived in North Sydney in early September 2026.

== Historical fleet ==
Marine Atlantic inherited numerous vessels from CN Marine in 1986, all of which have since been removed from service. Many of these vessels have gone through numerous ownership changes and, given their advanced age, most have been scrapped.

=== Cabot Strait ===
- MV Joseph and Clara Smallwood (scrapped)
- MV Caribou (sold, scrapped)
- MV Marine Evangeline (sold, renamed Ana; in service in the Mediterranean Sea)
- MV Ambrose Shea (sold, scrapped)
- HSC Max Mols; in service with Seajets
- MV Marine Nautica (sold, renamed Corsica Marina II; in service with Corsica Ferries - Sardinia Ferries)
- MV Marine Atlantica (sold, renamed Sardinia Vera; in service with Corsica Ferries - Sardinia Ferries)
- MV John Hamilton Gray (also operated on Northumberland Strait service, sold, renamed Contessa I and then Texas Treasure II, scrapped)
- Marine Cruiser (sold, scrapped at Alang)
- MV Sir Robert Bond (sold, laid up)
- MV Atlantic Freighter (sold, renamed Pelagitis, scrapped)
- MV Atlantic Vision; renamed MV Superfast IX, in service with Tallink

=== Gulf of Maine and Bay of Fundy ===
- MV Bluenose (sold, scrapped)
- MV Princess of Acadia (sold, scrapped)
- MV Bluenose (ex-Stena Jutlandica)
- MV Marine Evangeline (ex-Duke of Yorkshire)

=== Labrador coast ===
- MV Sir Robert Bond (sold, laid up)
- MV Northern Ranger (sold, in service with Nunatsiavut Marine Inc.)
- MV Nonia
- MV Bonavista (sold; scrapped Quebec)

=== Newfoundland south coast ===
- MV Marine Runner
- MV Marine Courier
- MV Marine Sprinter
- MV Taverner
- MV Petite Forte (sistership to MV Hopedale)
- MV Hopedale (caught fire and scuttled, 1984)

=== Northumberland Strait ===
- MV Abegweit (1982) (sold, renamed Accrued Mariner, scrapped)
- MV John Hamilton Gray (also operated on Cabot Strait service, sold, renamed Contessa I and then Texas Treasure II, scrapped)
- MV Vacationland (sold, renamed Fundy Paradise, laid up)
- MV Holiday Island (Caught fire on July 22, 2022, and was later scrapped due to the damage)
- For further information on ferries which operated on Northumberland Strait prior to Marine Atlantic's service (1986–1997), see: Confederation Bridge.

== Former routes ==
From its inception in 1986 until 1997, Marine Atlantic operated the following routes:

- Port aux Basques, NL along Newfoundland's remote South Coast serving outports and larger centres such as Burgeo and Ramea to Terrenceville
- Lewisporte, NL, and St. Anthony, NL along the rugged Labrador coast serving outports and larger centres such as Cartwright and Happy Valley-Goose Bay to Nain
- Borden, PE to Cape Tormentine, NB
- Saint John NB to Digby, NS
- Yarmouth, NS to Bar Harbor, Maine

== Newfoundland Dockyard ==
Marine Atlantic operated the Newfoundland Dockyard, a dry dock located in St. John's from 1986 until its sale in 1997. This facility had been established by the Newfoundland Railway to build and repair its coastal ferries. In 1949 it was transferred to Canadian National Railways after that company assumed ownership of the Newfoundland Railway when the country entered Confederation. Its responsibility was transferred to the railway's subsidiary CN Marine in 1977 and then to Marine Atlantic in 1986. Upon its privatization in 1997, it was renamed NewDock-St. John's Dockyard Company.

== See also ==
- Bay Ferries Limited
- Canadian National Railway
- CN Marine
- Newfoundland Railway
- Northumberland Ferries Limited
