= Princess of Acadia =

Princess of Acadia may refer to:

- SS Princess of Acadia (1951), was the former SS Princess of Nanaimo, a passenger and car ferry, before being renamed and reassigned in 1963 to running between Saint John, New Brunswick and Digby, Nova Scotia until 1971.
- MV Princess of Acadia (1971), is the second ferry of this name, running between Saint John, New Brunswick and Digby, Nova Scotia since 1971.
