= Demonstration plant =

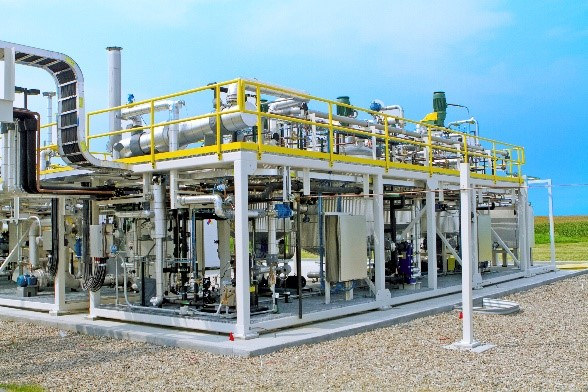
Demonstration Plant

A demonstration plant is an industrial system used to validate an industrial process for commercialization. It is larger than a pilot plant, and is the final stage in research, development and demonstration of a new process. Demonstration plants are built in a range of sizes, and the term 'demonstration plant' can sometimes be used interchangeably with 'pilot plant.' However, demonstration plants are generally larger than pilot plants, and are often constructed following a successful trial in a pilot scale size. Demonstration plants are used to prove a process works at industrial scale, and is financially viable in its intended industry.

== Goals ==
The goals of a demonstration plant are generally as follows:

- Prove a new technology using commercially available, pre-tested equipment.
- Show a reasonable return on investment (ROI) for the capital that will be invested in a full-scale system, including the operational costs of running such a system.
- In some cases, to start bringing product to market in significant enough amounts that production, distribution and target market viability can be established, including finalization of market testing.
- Establish a viable product method that will endure the test of a true manufacturing operation.

== Design factors ==
Many of the same design techniques that are used for pilot plants are also used when developing demonstration plants. 3D modeling, chemical similitude studies, mass and energy balances, risk factors, computational fluid dynamics (CFD), and mathematical modeling are common techniques used to design demonstration modules before actual fabrication occurs.

The emphasis in a demonstration plant is on using industrial equipment, rather than smaller-scale equipment, to prove process viability. A significant amount of product must be produced in equipment that will hold up over a long production lifetime and not be prohibitively expensive. A demonstration plant must show that enough end-product can be created to offset the costs of the commercial system over a period of time.

== See also ==
- Pilot plant
- Operations research
- Chemical engineering
- Process engineering
