= Marquise, Newfoundland and Labrador =

Settlement in Newfoundland and Labrador, Canada

Coordinates: 47°17′04″N 53°59′48″W

Location of Marquise in Newfoundland and Labrador

Marquise is a settlement in Newfoundland and Labrador. It is part of the Town of Placentia.
