= MV Blue Puttees =

Marine Atlantic ferry

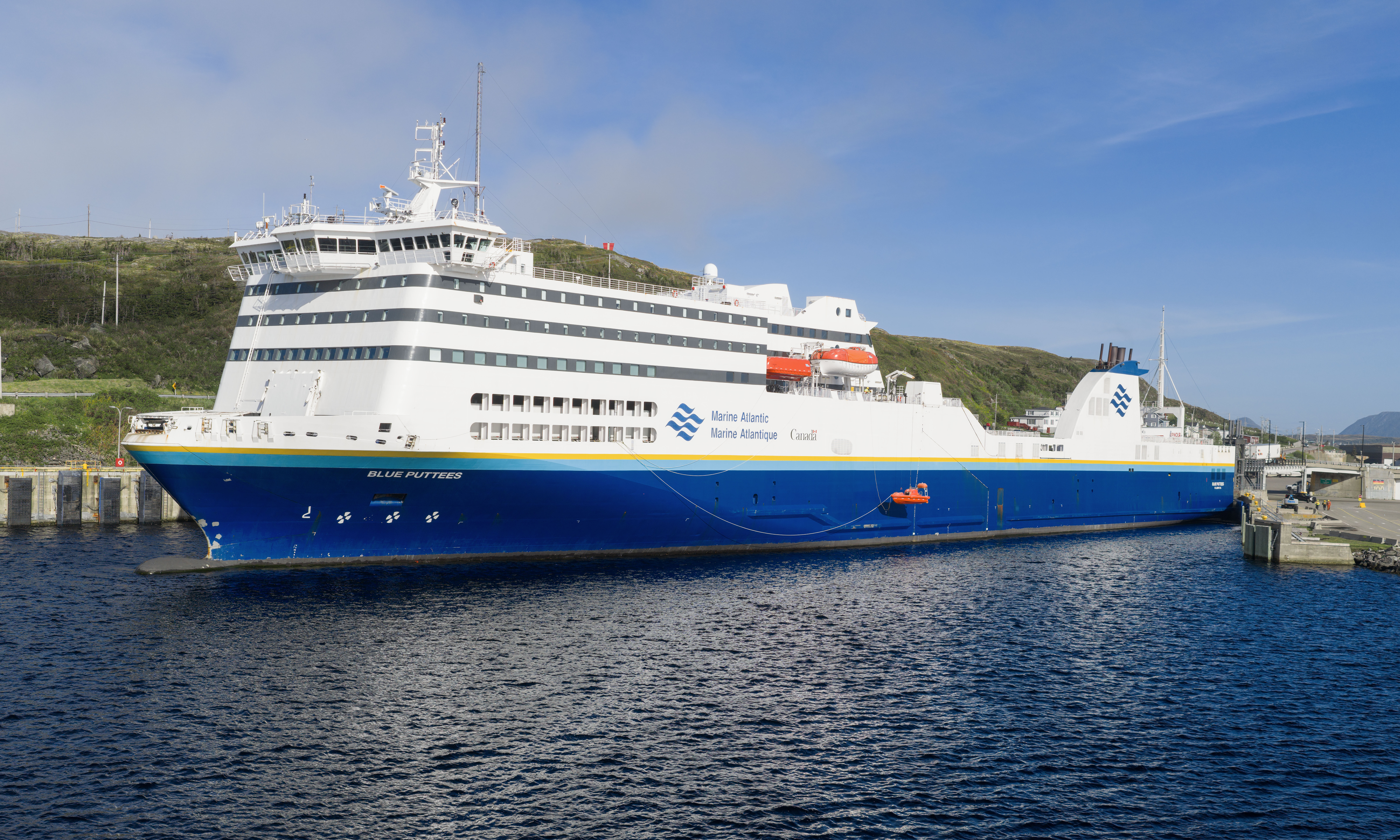
- Blue Puttees at Channel-Port aux Basques

History
- Name: 2007–2009: Stena Trader; 2011 onwards: Blue Puttees
- Operator: 2006–2009: Stena Line; 2011 onwards: Marine Atlantic
- Port of registry: St. John's, Canada
- Builder: Baltijsky Zavod Shipyard, Vasilyevsky Island, Russia/Fosen Mekaniske Verksteder (Fosen Yards), Rissa Municipality, Norway
- Laid down: 2004
- Launched: 2005
- Completed: 2006
- Identification: IMO number: 9331177; MMSI number: 316014040; Callsign: VXKF
- Status: In service

General characteristics
- Class & type: Seabridger
- Tonnage: 28,460 GT
- Length: 199.5 m (654.5 ft)
- Beam: 26.70 m (87.6 ft)
- Draught: 6.20 m (20.3 ft)
- Installed power: 2 × MAN 9L48/60B 9-cylinder diesel engines, 2 × Auxiliary Mitsubishi diesel engines
- Propulsion: 2 × controllable pitch propellers; 3 × bow thrusters
- Speed: 22 kn (40.7 km/h)
- Capacity: 1000 passengers; 2840 lane meters

MV Blue Puttees (ex-Stena Trader) is a Ro-Pax passenger/vehicle ferry operated by Marine Atlantic between the islands of Newfoundland and Cape Breton in eastern Canada. She is named after the nickname of the Royal Newfoundland Regiment.

Largely built in Russia, her assembly was finished in Norway. As part of Stena Line she regularly ran between The Netherlands and the United Kingdom from 2007 to 2009. After being leased by Marine Atlantic, she was taken to Bremerhaven, Germany to be converted so as to better suit the North Sydney to Channel-Port aux Basques route, which she would be taking over. This conversion included the addition of a third bow thruster, increase and renovation of the passenger areas, and shortening of the vessel by 12m to help facilitate docking at Channel-Port aux Basques. She entered regular passenger service with Marine Atlantic in early March 2011. Her nearly identical sister ship MV Highlanders followed her into service a few weeks later. In May 2015, Marine Atlantic announced that it had purchased both vessels from Stena for Can$100 million each.

== Incidents and accidents ==
On July 31, 2013, Blue Puttees ran aground after missing a turn in the harbour of Port aux Basques. The vessel managed to free herself at high tide. Following an underwater inspection, it was discovered that Blue Puttees had suffered damage to her bulbous bow, and would have to be taken out of service to allow repairs to take place at a drydock in Halifax. She was returned to service on August 20, 2013.
