= Channel-Port aux Basques =

- Town
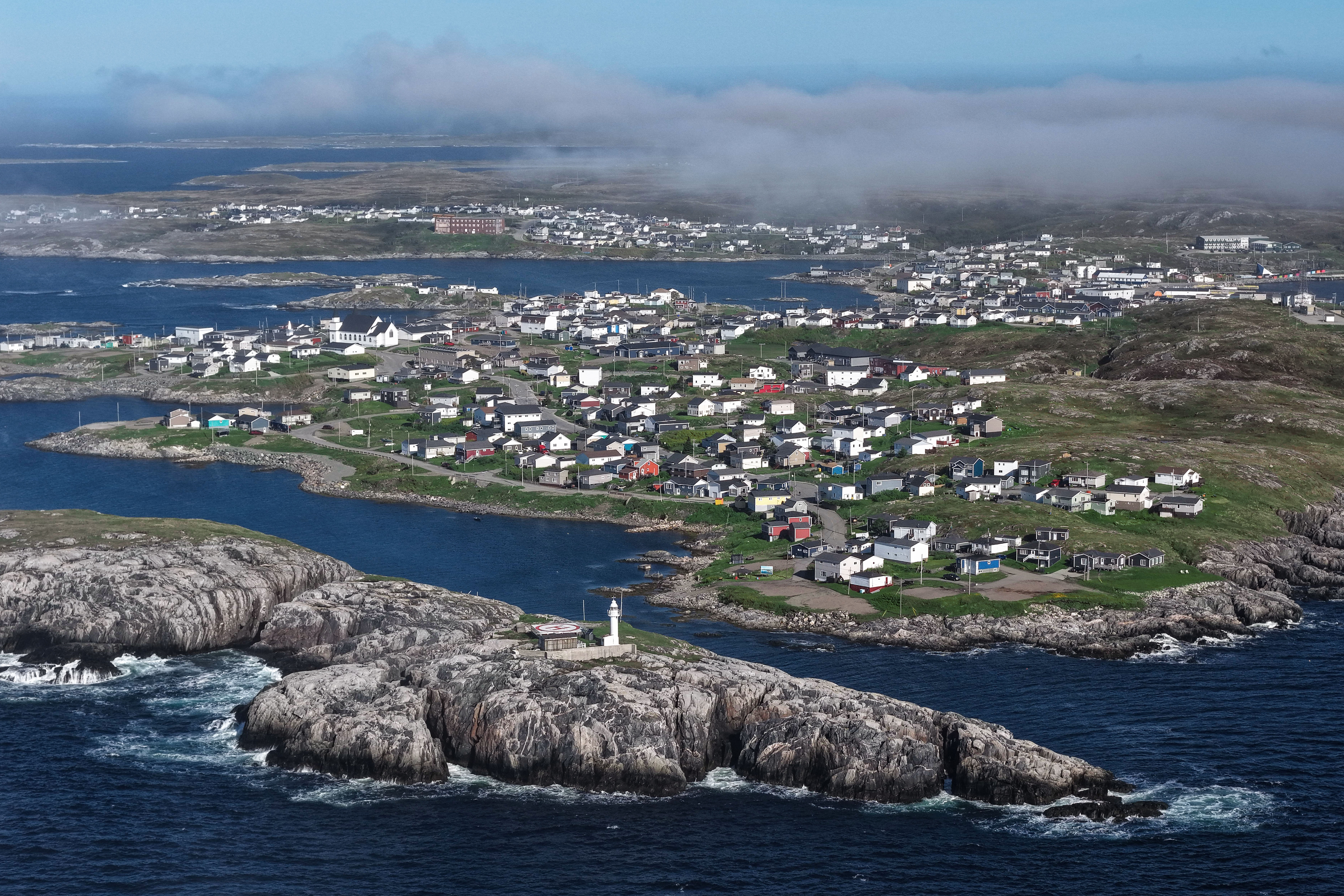
- Aerial view of Channel-Port aux Basques in June 2026.

- Location of Channel-Port aux Basques in Newfoundland Channel-Port aux Basques (Canada)
- Coordinates: 47°34′10″N 59°08′10″W
- Country: Canada
- Province: Newfoundland and Labrador
- Federal riding: Long Range Mountains
- Incorporated: 1945

Government
  - Type: Channel-Port aux Basques Town Council
  - Mayor: Brian Button

Area (2016)
  - Total: 38.77 km^{2} (14.97 sq mi)
  - Population Centre: 4.89 km^{2} (1.89 sq mi)
- Elevation: 23 m (75 ft)

Population (2021)
  - Total: 3,547
  - Density: 104.9/km^{2} (272/sq mi)
  - Population Centre: 3,665
  - Population Centre density: 749.4/km^{2} (1,941/sq mi)
- Time zone: UTC−03:30 (NST)
  - Summer (DST): UTC−02:30 (NDT)
- Postal code span: A0M
- Area code: 709
- Highways: Route 470; Route 1 (TCH)
- Website: portauxbasques.ca

Channel-Port aux Basques is a town at the extreme southwestern tip of Newfoundland fronting on the western end of the Cabot Strait. A Marine Atlantic ferry terminal is located in the town which is the primary entry point onto the island of Newfoundland and the western terminus of the Newfoundland and Labrador Route 1 (Trans-Canada Highway) in the province. The town was incorporated in 1945 and its population in the 2021 census was 3,547.

Port aux Basques is the oldest of the collection of villages that make up the present-day town, which consists of Port aux Basques, Channel, Grand Bay and Mouse Island. The town is called "Siinalk" in the Miꞌkmaq language.

== History ==
Channel was settled by fishermen from the Channel Islands in the early 1700s. Port aux Basques refers to the harbour that was a favoured sheltering and watering place for Basque whalers who hailed from the Basque region of Spain during the early 16th century. After leaving the harbour the whalers either proceeded to the main whaling grounds off southern Labrador, or headed home to the Basque country. They almost certainly took on fresh water from Dead Man's Brook, which flows into Port aux Basques harbour, during their stopovers.

Port aux Basques is first seen on a 1687 Johannes van Keulen map of the area. Permanent settlement came from French fishermen who overwintered on this, the French Shore, using rights given under the 1713 Treaty of Utrecht which saw France cede its claims in Newfoundland to Great Britain in exchange for right of use of coastal lands for the fishery. With the fishery being the economic mainstay for both French and British settlers in the area, Channel-Port aux Basques appeared destined to remain a collection of small fishing villages.

In 1856, an underwater telegraph cable was successfully laid between Newfoundland and Cape Breton Island, making landfall nearby. This was the first step in the race to complete a trans-Atlantic telegraph cable. A telegraph station was opened in Port aux Basques in 1857.

The Channel Head Lighthouse was established at the entrance to Port aux Basques harbour in 1875. The present cast-iron tower was built in 1895 to replace the original wooden lighthouse.

In the 1880s, the Government of Canada erected a lighthouse at nearby Cape Ray which, despite being in the then-separate British colony of Newfoundland, was considered a navigation hazard for vessels bound for Canadian ports in the Gulf of Saint Lawrence.

In 1893, it was decided to extend the western terminus of the Newfoundland Railway (then under construction west from the Avalon Peninsula by Robert G. Reid) from St. George's to Port aux Basques harbour. By 1897 the tracks reached Port aux Basques, although the harbour facilities had not been built at that time to handle the steamer Bruce, which had been built in Scotland and had arrived in Newfoundland several months earlier. While the required docks were constructed, the Bruce operated between Little Placentia Sound and North Sydney, Nova Scotia from October, 1897 until June, 1898.

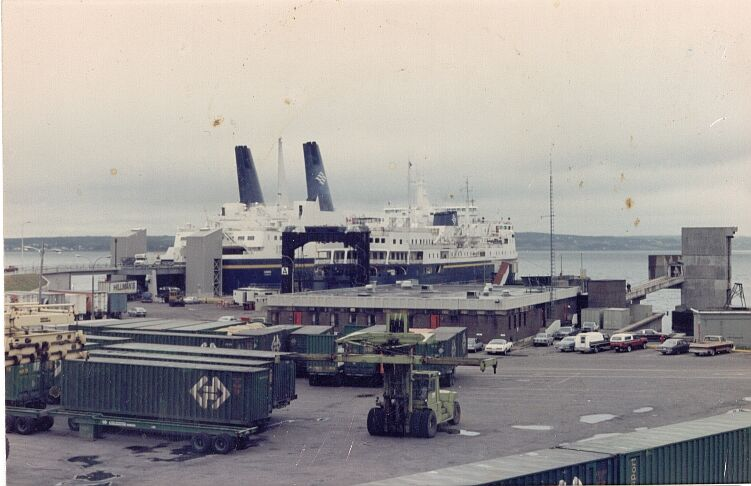
The Marine Atlantic superferry MV Caribou at North Sydney, with the smaller and older MV Ambrose Shea docked alongside her, seen in the late 1980s

On June 30, 1898, the first passenger train arrived in Port aux Basques, and Bruce departed for North Sydney shortly afterward. Over the years, the narrow gauge Newfoundland Railway expanded both the number of trains and vessels which called at Port Aux Basques. In 1925 the steamer SS Caribou began service. She was attacked and sunk by the German submarine U-69 (1940) on 14 October 1942 with a loss of 137 lives, some from the Port aux Basques area. There were 20 widows from Caribou sinking in the Port aux Basques area.

The town of Channel-Port aux Basques was incorporated in 1945 with Samuel (Sam) Walters as the first mayor. In 1964 the community of Mouse Island was annexed.

On March 31, 1949, Newfoundland entered into Confederation and the railway was transferred to Canadian National Railway. Under Term 32 of the Terms of Union between Canada and Newfoundland (1949), the ferry service between North Sydney, Nova Scotia and Port aux Basques, Newfoundland was guaranteed, first under the British North America Act and after 1982 under the Constitution of Canada.

Upon CNR's assumption of the railway and ferry service, the 1950s saw extensive construction at Port aux Basques with expansion of new dock facilities and the arrival of newer and larger ships such as the MV William Carson. Extensive blasting of rock created space for large rail yards with extensive dual gauge trackage. The excess rock was then used as fill to create the required docks. By the mid-1960s, new railcar-capable ferries such as the MV Frederick Carter permitted the exchange of standard gauge railcars, requiring further expansion at the Port aux Basques terminal facilities.

The mid-1960s also saw the completion of the Trans-Canada Highway across Newfoundland, an event which eventually led to the closure of the railway by 1988, but which made Port aux Basques into an even more important gateway to the island of Newfoundland, given the increased number of tourists visiting the province, and the rising amount of truck traffic. New Ro-Pax-capable vessels were commissioned and/or chartered during the 1960s–1980s to meet the growing demand, such as Marine Nautica, Marine Atlantica, Marine Evangeline, Ambrose Shea, and John Hamilton Gray.

With the abandonment of the railway, extensive rebuilding of Port aux Basques terminal resulted in expansive marshalling areas for waiting motor vehicle traffic. A plant disease inspection station operated by the Canadian Food Inspection Agency is located on site, as well as a modern rebuilt railway station now used as a passenger terminal for the ferry service operated by Marine Atlantic, which was renamed from CN Marine in 1986. Port aux Basques harbour used to host the arrival of the two largest icebreaking ferries in Canada at the time, the MV Caribou and MV Joseph and Clara Smallwood both of which were retired and decommissioned in 2011.

=== Hurricane Fiona ===
In September 2022, the town was partially evacuated due to Hurricane Fiona. Over 100 homes were reportedly washed away from the wind and storm surge in Newfoundland with a bulk of the homes being from the town. Many locals of the town claimed that it was the worst storm they’ve ever seen, and a community changing event. The town declared a state of emergency on September 24, 2022. On September 26, 2022, RCMP confirmed a 73-year-old Port aux Basques woman was killed after being swept out into the ocean. Newfoundland and Labrador is the only province with a confirmed loss of life directly related to the storm.

== Demographics ==
In the 2021 Census of Population conducted by Statistics Canada, Channel-Port aux Basques had a population of 3,547 living in 1,652 of its 1,814 total private dwellings, a change of −12.8% from its 2016 population of 4,067. With a land area of 38.84 km^{2} (15.00 sq mi), it had a population density of 91.3/km^{2} (236.5/sq mi) in 2021.

Historical Census Data – Channel-Port aux Basques
Year	Pop.	±%
1931	1,997	—
1941	2,381	+19.2%
1951	2,634	+10.6%
1956	3,301	+25.3%
1961	4,182	+26.7%
1981	6,102	+45.9%
1986	5,901	−3.3%
1991	5,644	−4.4%
1996	5,243	−7.1%
2001	4,637	−11.6%
2006	4,319	−6.9%
2011	4,170	−3.4%
2016	4,067	−2.5%
2021	3,547	−12.8%
Population figures reflect the town's amalgamation.

Canada 2016 Census		Population	% of Total Population
Visible minority group	South Asian	15	0.4%
Visible minority group	Chinese	0	0%
Visible minority group	Black	15	0.4%
Visible minority group	Filipino	0	0%
Visible minority group	Latin American	0	0%
Visible minority group	Arab	20	0.5%
Visible minority group	Southeast Asian	0	0%
Visible minority group	West Asian	0	0%
Visible minority group	Korean	0	0%
Visible minority group	Japanese	0	0%
Visible minority group	Other visible minority	0	0%
Visible minority group	Mixed visible minority	0	0%
Total visible minority population		55	1.4%
Aboriginal group	First Nations	125	3.1%
Aboriginal group	Métis	10	0.2%
Aboriginal group	Inuit	10	0.2%
Total Aboriginal population		160	3.9%
White		3,795	93.3%
Total population		4,010	100%

== Transportation ==
Both the Trans-Canada Highway and the Trans Canada Trail have their Newfoundland and Labrador start and end points in Port aux Basques.

=== Ferries ===
In 2009, a larger and more modern vessel, the MV Atlantic Vision, was added to the fleet. With a larger carrying capacity and an equivalent ice class to Caribou. Atlantic Vision was introduced as the new flagship for Marine Atlantic. Following the retirement of Caribou and Joseph and Clara Smallwood, two more new ships were acquired on a five-year charter from Stena Line. These two new ships, MV Blue Puttees and MV Highlanders, rounded out the Marine Atlantic fleet. Marine Atlantic announced in May 2015 that it would be purchasing both ships for C$100 Million each. On July 1, 2024, the Ala'suinu was added into the fleet after many delays. On March 15, 2024, Atlantic Vision was retired.

== College of the North Atlantic ==
The Port aux Basques campus of the College of the North Atlantic first opened as the District Vocational School in September 1963. The school was constructed by MR Chappell of Nova Scotia because Lundrigans Ltd of Corner Brook who was constructing the other District Vocational Schools in Newfoundland couldn't move their equipment and supplies over the uncompleted road from Corner Brook to Port aux Basques. The Trans-Canada Highway from Corner Brook to Port aux Basques was completed in 1965.

== Climate ==
Channel-Port aux Basques experiences a maritime-influenced subarctic climate that has the Köppen climate classification code of (Dfc). The location has strong seasonal lag as well as being cold for the latitude. This is since it is being influenced by the Icelandic Low and the Labrador Current, which renders a rare combination of cold and snowy winters along a seacoast at 47°N. In summer the warmup is strongly delayed by the cold waters and westerly winds from the interior of Canada are very cold in winter, further delaying the warming of the water. As a result, August is clearly warmer than July, and even September is more than 2 °C (3.6 °F) warmer than June is. Winter precipitation often falls as snow, for a high annual yield, but rainfall even in the coldest of February is still quite common, which lowers the snow cover to average about 55 cm (22 in) at its annual peak.

Climate data for Channel-Port aux Basques, Canadian Climate Normals 1981–2010 Station Data
Month	Jan	Feb	Mar	Apr	May	Jun	Jul	Aug	Sep	Oct	Nov	Dec	Year
Record high humidex	9.4	10.3	10.6	14.9	20.9	27.5	29.1	31.2	32.0	22.8	19.0	10.7	32.0
Record high °C (°F)	9.9 (49.8)	8.9 (48.0)	11.2 (52.2)	18.2 (64.8)	22.2 (72.0)	25.3 (77.5)	27.8 (82.0)	27.2 (81.0)	30.0 (86.0)	25.0 (77.0)	15.0 (59.0)	10.7 (51.3)	30.0 (86.0)
Mean daily maximum °C (°F)	−1.8 (28.8)	−2.8 (27.0)	−0.4 (31.3)	4.3 (39.7)	9.0 (48.2)	13.2 (55.8)	17.2 (63.0)	18.7 (65.7)	15.5 (59.9)	10.6 (51.1)	5.6 (42.1)	0.9 (33.6)	7.5 (45.5)
Daily mean °C (°F)	−5.1 (22.8)	−6.4 (20.5)	−3.6 (25.5)	1.4 (34.5)	5.7 (42.3)	9.8 (49.6)	14.0 (57.2)	15.3 (59.5)	12.1 (53.8)	7.4 (45.3)	2.8 (37.0)	−2.1 (28.2)	4.3 (39.7)
Mean daily minimum °C (°F)	−8.4 (16.9)	−9.9 (14.2)	−6.7 (19.9)	−1.5 (29.3)	2.4 (36.3)	6.3 (43.3)	10.7 (51.3)	11.9 (53.4)	8.6 (47.5)	4.1 (39.4)	0.0 (32.0)	−5 (23)	1.0 (33.8)
Record low °C (°F)	−23.3 (−9.9)	−26.1 (−15.0)	−24.1 (−11.4)	−13.3 (8.1)	−6.7 (19.9)	−1.1 (30.0)	3.5 (38.3)	2.8 (37.0)	0.0 (32.0)	−4 (25)	−11.3 (11.7)	−21.2 (−6.2)	−26.1 (−15.0)
Record low wind chill	−37	−40	−38	−23	−12	−3	0.0	0.0	0.0	−11	−21	−34	−40
Average precipitation mm (inches)	151.6 (5.97)	125.2 (4.93)	107.5 (4.23)	139.1 (5.48)	118.6 (4.67)	127.4 (5.02)	112.5 (4.43)	118.6 (4.67)	125.4 (4.94)	145.2 (5.72)	151.2 (5.95)	172.2 (6.78)	1,594.5 (62.79)
Average rainfall mm (inches)	48.7 (1.92)	41.8 (1.65)	57.6 (2.27)	118.9 (4.68)	115.7 (4.56)	127.4 (5.02)	112.5 (4.43)	118.5 (4.67)	125.4 (4.94)	143.3 (5.64)	127.1 (5.00)	92.9 (3.66)	1,229.8 (48.44)
Average snowfall cm (inches)	101.9 (40.1)	81.7 (32.2)	49.1 (19.3)	17.4 (6.9)	2.4 (0.9)	0.0 (0.0)	0.0 (0.0)	0.0 (0.0)	0.0 (0.0)	2.2 (0.9)	21.8 (8.6)	78.6 (30.9)	355.0 (139.8)
Average precipitation days (≥ 0.2 mm)	26.2	21.5	19.4	16.2	15.0	16.3	16.5	15.2	16.7	18.4	20.1	24.2	225.6
Average rainy days (≥ 0.2 mm)	5.7	5.1	7.5	12.9	15.6	16.3	16.5	15.3	16.9	18.0	14.4	8.7	152.9
Average snowy days (≥ 0.2 cm)	24.5	20.2	15.1	6.4	0.8	0.1	0.0	0.0	0.1	1.1	9.4	19.9	97.6
Average relative humidity (%)	80.1	79.3	78.1	78.7	76.9	79.8	83.8	82.0	79.7	78.0	80.9	80.6	79.8
Source: Environment and Climate Change Canada

== Sports ==
Port aux Basques placed second in the top five communities for Kraft Hockeyville 2008, and won $20,000 for its local arena. Its sports arena, Bruce I, burned down in 1995, just prior to the hockey season. It was located on top of Army Hill on a road named Stadium Road down in Channel. The new arena, Bruce II Sports Centre, was opened on November 23, 1996.

== See also ==
- List of municipalities in Newfoundland and Labrador
- Isle aux Morts
