= MV Highlanders =

Marine Atlantic ferry

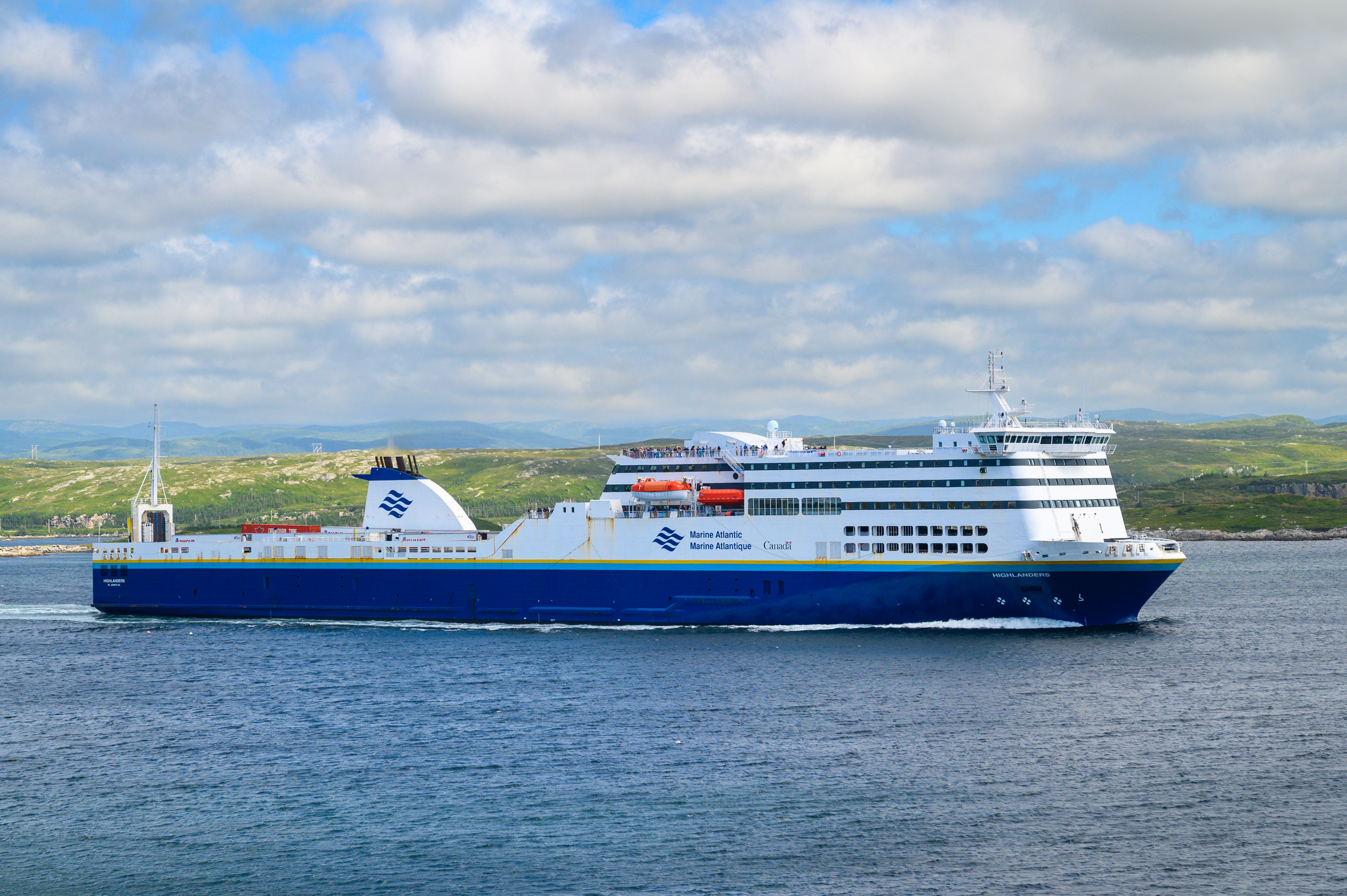
- MV Highlanders at Channel-Port aux Basques, Canada

History
- Name: 2007-2009: Stena Traveller; 2011 onwards: Highlanders
- Operator: 2006-2009: Stena Line; 2011 onwards: Marine Atlantic
- Port of registry: St. John's, Canada
- Builder: Baltijsky Zavod Shipyard, Vasilyevsky Island, Russia/Fosen Mekaniske Verksteder (Fosen Yards), Rissa Municipality, Norway
- Laid down: 14 June 2005
- Launched: 8 December 2006
- Completed: 12 June 2007
- Identification: IMO number: 9331189; MMSI number: 316019125; Callsign: VYGT
- Status: In service

General characteristics
- Class & type: Seabridger
- Tonnage: 28,460 GT
- Length: 199.5 m (654.5 ft)
- Beam: 26.70 m (87.6 ft)
- Draught: 6.20 m (20.3 ft)
- Installed power: 2 × MAN 9L48/60B 9-cylinder diesel engines, 2 × Auxiliary Mitsubishi diesel engines
- Propulsion: 2 × controllable pitch propellers; 3 × bow thrusters
- Speed: 22 kn (40.7 km/h)
- Capacity: 1000 passengers; 2840 lane meters

MV Highlanders (ex-MV Stena Traveller) is a Ro-Pax passenger/vehicle ferry operated by the Canadian Crown corporation Marine Atlantic. She operates between the islands of Newfoundland and Cape Breton in eastern Canada and is named after several Nova Scotian infantry regiments which fought in the first and second world wars.

Largely built in Russia, her assembly was finished in Norway. As part of Stena Line she regularly ran between The Netherlands and the United Kingdom from 2007-2009. After being leased by Marine Atlantic, she was taken to Bremerhaven, Germany to be converted to better suit the North Sydney to Channel-Port aux Basques route, which she would be taking over. This conversion included the addition of a third bow thruster, increase and renovation of the passenger areas, and shortening of the vessel by 12m to help facilitate docking at Channel-Port aux Basques. She entered regular passenger service with Marine Atlantic in mid April 2011 shortly after her nearly identical sister ship MV Blue Puttees. In May 2015, Marine Atlantic announced that it had purchased both vessels from Stena for Can$100 million each.
