= List of shipwrecks of Canada =

This is a list of shipwrecks located in or off the coast of Canada.

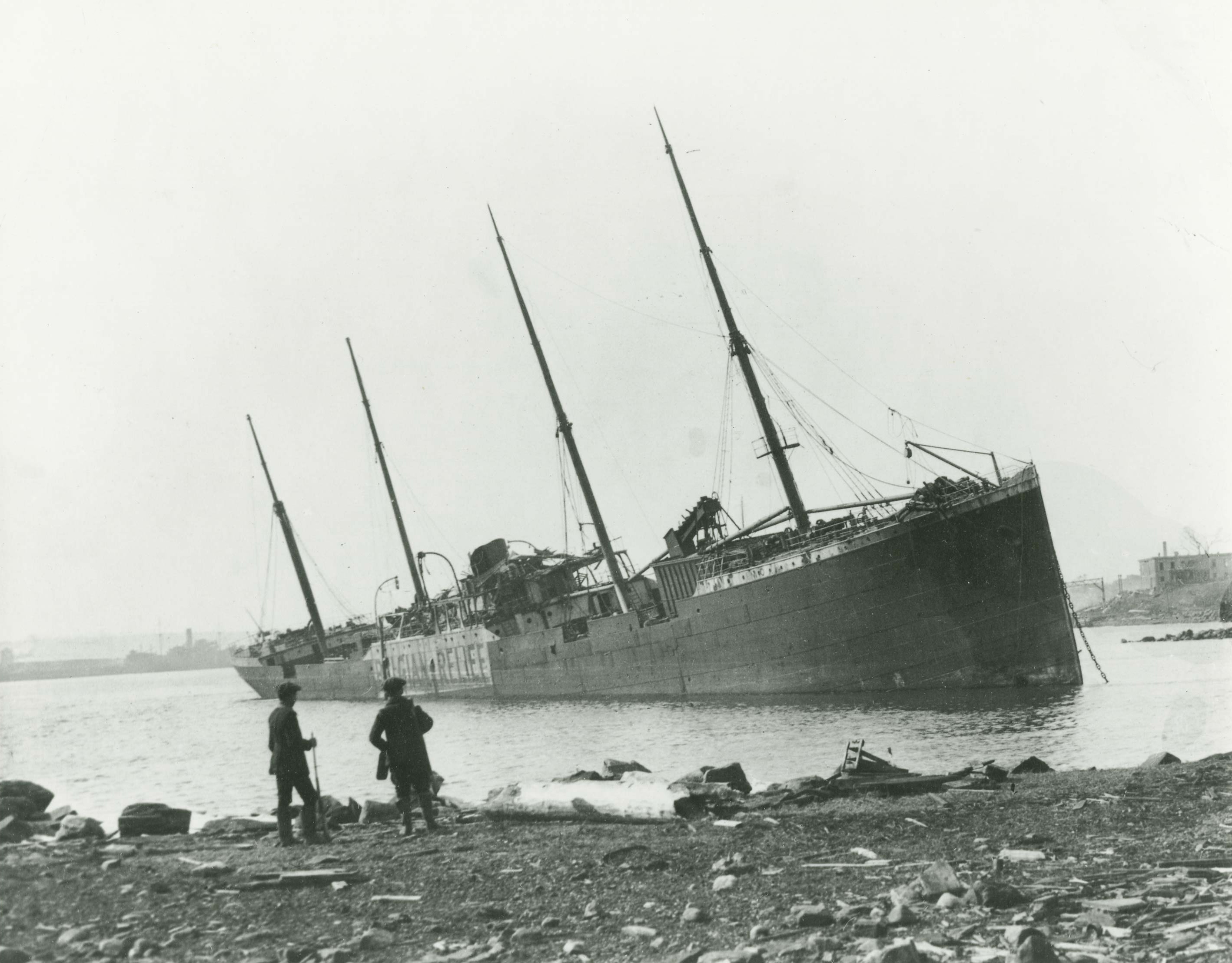
The Norwegian steamship Imo (damaged in the Halifax Explosion in 1917)

== British Columbia ==
Ship	Flag	Sunk date	Notes	Coordinates	Image
HMCS Annapolis	Royal Canadian Navy	4 April 2015	A decommissioned Annapolis-class destroyer scuttled to form an artificial reef in Halkett Bay Provincial Park off Gambier Island in Howe Sound, British Columbia, Canada.	49°26′57″N 123°19′51″W	
Anscomb	Canada	January 2003	The ferry was docked at Woodbury marina by the private owner and sunk from a frozen cracked pipe at Woodbury, British Columbia.		
Beaver	Canada	25 July 1888	A steamship run aground on rocks at Prospect Point in Vancouver's Stanley Park.	49.314049°N 123.142175°W	
Bonnington	Canada	1960	A steamboat that retired from service and was partially dismantled before sinking off the shore off Beaton.	50.741°N 117.734°W	
USAT Brigadier General M. G. Zalinski	United States Army	26 September 1946	A troopship that struck the rocks and sank off Pitt Island.	53°31.308′N 129°34.774′W	
HMCS Charlottetown	Royal Canadian Navy	1947	A River-class frigate that was scuttled as a breakwater in Oyster Bay.		
HMCS Chaudière	Maritime Command	1992	A Restigouche-class destroyer sunk as an artificial reef in Sechelt Inlet.	49°37.694′N 123°48.699′W	
City of Ainsworth	Canada	29 November 1898	A paddle steamer sternwheeler sunk during a storm in Kootenay Lake.	49.484°N 116.811°W	
Clallam	Canada	8 January 1904	A steamboat that sunk in a storm in the Strait of Juan de Fuca.		
HMCS Columbia	Maritime Command	1996	A Restigouche-class destroyer that was sunk as an artificial reef.	50°8′N 125°20′W	
Cowichan	Canada	27 December 1925	A steamship that sank in a collision with Lady Cynthia near the Whyte Rocks.	49.399°N 123.712°W	
Eaglescliffe Hall	Canada	25 October 1961	A bulk freighter that served in World War II and later sank while under tow.		
Ericsson	United States	22 November 1892	Blown aground at the entrance to Barkley Sound, designed by inventor John Ericsson in 1851	48.830379°N 125.243956°W	
Florence	United States	December 1902	A clipper believed to have foundered in a storm off Cape Flattery.		
HMS Grappler	Royal Navy	3 May 1883	An Albacore-class gunboat that caught fire and sank in Discovery Passage.	50.213°N 125.3721°W	
HMCS Huron	Maritime Command	14 May 2007	An Iroquois-class destroyer sunk as a target.	48°58′.472″N 127°58′.638″W	
HMCS Mackenzie	Maritime Command	16 September 1995	A Mackenzie-class destroyer scuttled as an artificial reef off Sidney.	48°40.094′N 123°17.17′W	
Malahat	Canada	March 1944	A schooner and rum-runner during the Prohibition era, that foundered in Barkley Sound and was towed to Powell River.	49.859297°N 124.547962°W	
Mariposa	Canada	18 December 1917	Ran aground in the Salish Sea.		
Mount Royal	Canada	6 July 1907	A Canadian sternwheeler sunk in the Skeena River.	54.5508°N 128.4847°W	
Nechacco	Canada	April 1911	A sternwheeler that broke apart in ice on the Fraser River.	53.1315°N 122.6690°W	
Pacific	Canada	4 November 1875	A sidewheel steamer sunk following a collision with SS Orpheus.	48.383117°N 125.001361°W	
Princess Sophia	Canada	25 October 1918	A steamer that ran aground on Vanderbilt Reef and sank the following day.	58.6022°N 135.0236°W	
Queen of the North	Canada	22 March 2006	A ro-ro ferry run aground on Gil Island in Wright Sound.	53°19.917′N 129°14.729′W	
Quesnel	Canada	13 May 1921	A sternwheeler that was wrecked on the Fraser River.		
San Pedro	Canada	24 November 1891	A 3,119-ton iron steamship built 1882 by William Cramp & Sons, Philadelphia ran aground Brotchie Ledge Victoria, British Columbia	48.4065°N 123.3880°W	
HMCS Saskatchewan	Maritime Command	14 June 1997	A Mackenzie-class destroyer scuttled as an artificial reef off Nanaimo.	49°12.96′N 123°53.070′W	
Sechelt	Canada	24 March 1911	A steamboat that sank off Race Rocks Light.		
USS South Dakota	United States Navy	18 February 1961	A Pennsylvania-class armored cruiser that was sold for scrap and sunk in Powell River.	49.869°N 124.560°W	
USS Tattnall	United States Navy	1946	A Wickes-class destroyer sunk a breakwater off Royston.	49.6526°N 124.9499°W	
Tonquin	United States	June 1811	An American merchant ship blown up at Clayoquot Sound, Vancouver Island.		
Valencia	Canada	23 January 1906	A passenger steamer wrecked off the coast of Vancouver Island.	48°42′20″N 125°00′21″W	
Vanlene	Panama	14 March 1972	A 10,500-ton freighter carrying cars, built in 1951. The ship ran aground near Austin Island in Barkley Sound due to navigation error.	48.858949°N 125.312021°W	

== Manitoba ==
Ship	Flag	Sunk date	Notes	Coordinates
Alpha	Canada	1885	A riverboat grounded in the Assiniboine River	
Graham Bell	Canada	1992	A tugboat grounded near Churchill, Manitoba; Later scuttled 1992 as Canada's first Arctic Underwater Research Station	
Ithaka	Greece	14 September 1960	A cargo ship that ran aground near Churchill.	58°46′9″N 93°53′21″W
Port Nelson	Canada	1924	A large dredge grounded on the abandoned pier at Port Nelson, Manitoba	
Princess	Canada	24 August 1906	A steamboat that was wrecked in a storm off George Island.	

== New Brunswick ==
Ship	Flag	Sunk date	Notes	Coordinates
Transpet	Panama	30 October 1951	A tanker that suffered an internal explosion off Miscou Island.	
Walton	Canada	14 September 1878	A barque that ran aground in fog off Grand Manan Island.	

== Newfoundland and Labrador ==
Ship	Flag	Sunk date	Notes	Coordinates
Abyssinia	Canada	18 December 1891	A steamship destroyed by a fire in the cargo hold.	
Administratrix	Canada	1948	A motor vessel that collided with Lovadal in fog near Cape Race.	
HMS Aeneas	Royal Navy	23 October 1805	A troopship that ran ashore near the Isle aux Morts with the loss of over 200 lives.	
Ahern Trader	Canada	9 January 1960	A steamship that ran aground during rough weather in Frederickton, no lives were lost.	
Anglo Saxon	United Kingdom	27 April 1863	A British Allan liner that ran aground off Cape Race, with 237 deaths.	
Anton van Driel	Netherlands	1919	A Dutch steamboat that sank near St. Shotts.	
Arctic	United States	27 September 1854	A paddle steamer that collided with the steamer Vesta and sank near Cape Race.	
Arctic Explorer	Canada	3 July 1981	An icebreaker that sank off the Strait of Belle Isle, three hours after departing St Anthony.	
Argo	United Kingdom	28 June 1859	A steamboat that ran aground on a reef at Trepassey Bay.	
Azariah		16 March 1831	A sealing ship from Cupids that ran aground on Baccalieu Island.	
Belgian	United Kingdom	27 June 1941	A steamboat that was torpedoed by U-96 near the Peckford Reef.	49°30′38″N 53°51′30″W
Bristol City	United Kingdom	5 May 1943	A cargo ship that was torpedoed by U-358 east of Newfoundland, Canada.	54°00′N 43°55′W
Caribou	Newfoundland	14 October 1942	A Newfoundland Railway ferry that was torpedoed by U-69 off Port aux Basques.	47°19′N 59°29′W
City of Philadelphia	United Kingdom	9 September 1854	A British steamboat that ran aground and sunk in fog near Cape Race.	
HMS Comus	Royal Navy	24 October 1816	A Laurel-class post ship that ran aground and sank in fog off Cape Pine.	
HMS Crusader	Royal Navy	14 September 1942	A C-class destroyer that was torpedoed by German submarine U-91 off St. John's.	
Delmar	United Kingdom	1901	A Scottish steamer that sank near Cape Race in 1901.	
HMS Despatch	Royal Navy	10 July 1828	A British brig that sank near Isle aux Morts.	
HMS Drake	Royal Navy	1822	Ran aground and sank near St. Shotts.	
HMS Duchess of Cumberland	Royal Navy	22 September 1781	A sloop that was wrecked near Cape Ray.	
Duchess of Fife		1907	A schooner that sank near Bonavista.	
Dunbrody		1875	A barque that foundered off the Labrador coast.	
Earlshall	Newfoundland	24 January 1915	A Job Bros. & Co iron-hulled barque that ran aground and sank off Petty Harbour-Maddox Cove during a winter storm. No loss of life.	
Erik	United Kingdom	25 August 1918	A sealing/whaling steamer that was torpedoed off St. Pierre and Miquelon by U-156.	
Ethie	Canada	11 December 1919	A coastal steamship that ran aground in a fierce storm.	
Flare	Cyprus	16 January 1998	A bulk carrier that sank in a storm near Saint Pierre and Miquelon.	
Florence	United States	9 August 1840	An American brig of 200 tons, out of Rotterdam, that sank in the fog near Cape Race with 50 dead.	
Florizel	Newfoundland	23 February 1918	The passenger ship ran aground at Horn Head Point, Cappahayden and was wrecked with the loss of 94 lives	46°50′56″N 52°56′20″W
SS Flynderborg	United Kingdom	3 November 1941	A merchant ship that was torpedoed by U-202 northeast of Notre Dame Bay, Newfoundland.	51°21′N 51°45′W
George Cromwell	United Kingdom	1877	A British steamer that sank near Cape Race.	
George Washington	United States	1877	An American steamer that sank near Cape Race.	
Germania	Germany	1869	A German steamer that sank in fog near Cape Race.	
Greenland	Canada	1898	A sealing steamer that lost 48 men on the ice.	
Harcourt Kent	Canada	1949	A motor ship that sank near Cape Race.	
Harpooner	United Kingdom	1816	A British transport that ran aground and sank in fog near Cape Pine. She was on a voyage from Quebec City, Lower Canada, British North America to an English port.	
Harvest Home	United Kingdom	1833	A British ship that sank off Cape Race.	
Helgoland	Germany	1900	A German steamer that sank near Cape Race.	
Indian	United Kingdom	1859	A British Allan liner that sank off Cape Race.	
Kristianiafjord	Norway	15 June 1917	A Norwegian liner that ran aground in fog near Cape Race.	
Kyle	Canada	4 February 1967	A troopship that ran aground in Harbour Grace.	
Labrador	United Kingdom	3 March 1913	Built for the Hudson Bay Company in 1891 by Watson of Sunderland England, purchased in 1909 by James Baird Ltd. of St. John’s for the seal fishery. Sprang a leak while butting through slob ice in heavy seas. Engineers kept it afloat for 30 hours to reach St. Mary's Bay, where it ran onto rocks at Branch. All crew were saved.	
Lady of the Lake	United Kingdom	11 May 1833	A Scottish brig sunk near Cape St. Francis.	46.50°N 47.10°W
Lady Sherbrooke	United Kingdom	9 August 1831	A barque that sank in a gale near Port Aux Basques. The ship was wrecked on Mouse Island, in the Gulf of Saint Lawrence with the loss of 241 of the 273 people on board. She was on a voyage from Londonderry to Quebec, British North America. Her captain was subsequently found guilty of willfully wrecking the ship and was sentenced to death.	
Lion		6 January 1882	Reported missing in Baccalieu Tickle.	
Lord Strathcona	Canada	5 September 1942	An iron-ore carrier that was torpedoed by U-513 off Bell Island.	47°35′18″N 52°58′10″W
Maggie		6 November 1896	A schooner that sank in the St.John's Narrows due to a collision with the Tiber	
Marsland	United Kingdom	2 July 1933	An English cargo vessel that ran aground on the Vestal Rocks outside St. John's, Newfoundland.	
Marvale	Canada	1923	A Canadian Pacific liner.	
Marvita	Canada	15 July 1954	A Canadian Customs boat that ran aground and foundered off Cape Ballard.	
MSC Baltic III	Liberia	15 February 2025	The Container ship was thrown aground after losing power in a storm.	
Ocean Ranger	United States	15 February 1982	A semi-submersible offshore oil drilling unit that sank in a storm off St. John's.	46°43′33.53″N 48°50′9.13″W
Phyllis	Royal Navy	October 1795	The ship was wrecked near the Burin Peninsula, with some loss of life.	
P.L.M. 27	United Kingdom	26 June 1941	An iron-ore carrier that was torpedoed by U-123 off Bell Island.	
USS Pollux	United States Navy	18 February 1942	A supply ship that sank along with USS Truxtun in a storm.	46°54′1″N 55°33′51″W
President Coaker	Canada	1924	A schooner sunk in a gale near Cape Race.	
Queen of Swansea	(United Kingdom of Great Britain and Ireland) Canada	1867	Ran aground and sunk in storm at Gull Island.	
Quest	Norway	5 May 1962	Holed by crushing ice and sank off the south coast of Labrador.	
HMS Raleigh	Royal Navy	8 August 1922	A Hawkins-class heavy cruiser that sank in fog at Point Amour in Strait of Belle Isle.	
Regulus	Newfoundland	23 October 1910	An A. Harvey & Company bulk carrier that ran aground and sank off Petty Harbour-Maddox Cove while under tow during a southeast gale. All 19 crew were lost.	
Rose Castle	Canada	2 November 1942	An iron-ore carrier that was torpedoed by U-518 off Bell Island.	
Royal Oak	United Kingdom	11 October 1823 to 19 October 1823	300 tons burthen snow brig left Quebec on 11 October with timber cargo, struck by large wave off Seven Islands on 14 October and badly damaged, swept south by storm until 19 October off Cap Roziere, New Brunswick when four surviving crew members were rescued by the vessel Margaret passing en route to Quebec. Royal Oak presumed foundered. Reported in Quebec Courant.	Source: Quebec Courant 30 Oct 1823.
Saganaga	United Kingdom	5 September 1942	An iron-ore carrier that was torpedoed by a U-513 off Wabana, Newfoundland.	
San Juan de Pasajes	Basques	December 1565	While sitting at anchor in Red Bay bay with other whaling ships, she broke her moorings during a storm, struck an island and sank with a full load of 1,000 casks of oil.	51°43′55″N 56°25′32″W
Santa Celia	Spain	22 November 1972	Cod-fishing trawler, she burned in November 1972 in Saint Pierre and was sunk in the Gulf of St Lawrence.	46°33′N 56°50′W
HMS Sapphire	Kingdom of England	11 September 1696	A fifth-rate warship that was scuttled to prevent capture by France.	
Sea Clipper	(United Kingdom of Great Britain and Ireland) Canada	1867	A schooner that sank in a storm near Spotted Island, Labrador.	
HMCS Shawinigan	Royal Canadian Navy	25 November 1944	A Flower-class corvette that was torpedoed by U-1228 off Channel-Port aux Basques.	47°34′N 59°11′W
Southern Cross	Canada	31 March 1914	A Newfoundland sealing steamer that was lost in a blizzard.	
RMS Titanic	United Kingdom	15 April 1912	A British passenger liner operated by the White Star Line that sank in the North Atlantic Ocean 320 nautical miles (590 km; 370 mi) south-southeast of Newfoundland, Canada on 15 April 1912, after striking an iceberg during her maiden voyage.	41.7325°N 49.946944°W
Titan	Bahamas	18 June 2023	Imploded during its descent in the North Atlantic Ocean, 320 nautical miles (590 km; 370 mi) off the coast of Newfoundland.	41.731944°N 49.945833°W
HMS Tweed	Royal Navy	5 November 1813	Sunk in a storm near Bay Bulls.	
U-174	Kriegsmarine	16 November 1942	A Type IXC U-boat that was sunk by an American aircraft southwest of Newfoundland, Canada.	43°35′N 56°18′W
U-438	Kriegsmarine	6 May 1943	A Type VIIC U-boat sunk by depth charges off Newfoundland.	
U-520	Kriegsmarine	30 October 1942	A Type IXC U-boat sunk by Canadian aircraft off St. John's.	47°47′N 49°50′W
U-656	Kriegsmarine	1 March 1942	A Type VIIC U-boat sunk by depth charges off Cape Race.	
U-1229	Kriegsmarine	20 August 1944	A Type IXC/40 U-boat that was sunk by Allied aircraft southeast of Newfoundland.	42°20′N 51°39′W
Viking	Canada	15 March 1931	A sealing barque that exploded off Horse Islands during the shooting of extra footage for the film The Viking, killing 27, including the film's producer.	
Village Belle		1872	A schooner that was lost at Cape St. Francis.	
Waterwitch		1875	Sunk near Pouch Cove.	
William Carson	Canada	3 June 1977	A Canadian National ferry that struck an iceberg.	

== Northwest Territories ==
Ship	Flag	Sunk date	Notes	Coordinates
HMS Investigator	Royal Navy	After 3 June 1853	Arctic exploration ship, part of the McClure Arctic expedition. Icebound in Mercy Bay, abandoned June 1853. Found in the Beaufort Sea, July 2010.	74.084397°N 119.002619°W

== Nova Scotia ==
Ship	Flag	Sunk date	Notes	Coordinates
CGS Aberdeen	Canada	13 October 1923	A buoy tender that ran aground on the wreck of Snipe off Seal Island.	
Arctic Bear	United States	19 March 1963	A steamship that foundered off Cape Sable Island while under tow.	42°40′N 65°11′W
Arrow	Canada	4 February 1970	An oil tanker that ran aground off Isle Madame.	45.467049°N 61.104376°W
Astrea	United Kingdom	8 May 1834	The barque was wrecked 5 nautical miles (9.3 km) east of Louisbourg, Nova Scotia, British North America with the loss of 208 of the 211 people on board.	
RMS Atlantic	United Kingdom	1 April 1873	A White Star Line ocean liner that ran aground near Meagher's Island.	44°27′55.9″N 63°42′37.9″W
Auguste	Great Britain	15 November 1761	A full-rigged transport, run aground on the northeastern side of Cape Breton Island.	
Capricieux	France	21 July 1758	A French warship that caught fire and burned in the siege of Louisbourg.	
HMCS Cartier	Royal Canadian Navy	1957	A hydrographic survey vessel and training ship that was scuttled off Sydney.	
Célèbre	France	21 July 1758	A French warship that caught fire and burned in the siege of Louisbourg.	
Chameau	France	27 August 1725	A French navy transport ship that was swept by a storm onto rocks near Louisbourg.	
Charlottetown	Canada	18 June 1941	A CN Marine car ferry that ran aground and sank off Little Hope Island, near Port Mouton.	
Christmas Seal	Canada	13 May 1976	A floating medical clinic that struck a reef off the Eastern Shore.	
HMCS Clayoquot	Royal Canadian Navy	24 December 1944	A Bangor-class minesweeper that was torpedoed by U-806 near Sambro Island Light.	44°25′N 63°20′W
Constantia	United Kingdom	13 May 1823	The ship was built at Quebec in 1822, shifted her registry to Bristol, and was wrecked near Gabarus Bay, Cape Breton. No lives were lost; part of the cargo was saved.	
Cyclops	United Kingdom	11 January 1942	A cargo ship that was torpedoed by U-123 southeast of Cape Sable Island, Canada.	41°51′N 63°48′W
Empire Dabchick	United Kingdom	3 December 1942	A cargo ship that was torpedoed by U-183 about 200 nmi (370 km; 230 mi) east of Sable Island, Canada.	43°00′N 58°17′W
Enterprise		20 November 1802	A brig that caught fire and only 3 of the 24 crew survived.	
Enterprise	Canada	20 April 1970	A Newfoundland herring seiner fishing vessel which sank during a storm off the northeast coast of Cape Breton Island. All eight crew were lost. The vessel Patrick Morris, while assisting in the search-and-rescue mission, also sank.	
Entreprenant	France	21 July 1758	A French warship struck with cannon fire by the Royal Navy off Louisbourg, burned and exploded.	
Erg	Canada	24 August 1943	A tugboat that sank in Halifax Harbour on 6 June 1943, when she collided with the freighter Norelg; she was raised so that the bodies of the dead could be recovered, then re-sunk on 24 August.	
Esperanto	Canada	30 May 1921	A schooner that hit a submerged wreck off Sable Island.	
HMCS Esquimalt	Royal Canadian Navy	16 April 1945	A Bangor-class minesweeper that was torpedoed by U-190 off Chebucto Head.	44°28′N 63°10′W
HMS Fantome	Royal Navy	24 November 1814	A brig-sloop that ran aground near the village of Prospect.	
HMS Feversham	Royal Navy	7 October 1711	A fifth-rate warship that was wrecked off Louisbourg.	
Hannah	United Kingdom	29 April 1849	An Irish famine ship which was holed by ice between Nova Scotia and Newfoundland.	
Havana	Canada	26 April 1906	A wooden schooner that was accidentally rammed by the steamer Strathcona off Point Pleasant Park.	
Hungarian	United Kingdom	19 February 1860	A steamship wrecked off Cape Sable Island, with the loss of 205 lives.	
Imo	Norway	6 December 1917	Halifax Explosion: The cargo ship collided with Mont-Blanc (France) at Halifax, Nova Scotia. Mont-Blanc caught fire and was obliterated in a massive explosion that killed approximately 2,000 people and drove Imo ashore. Imo subsequently was refloated, repaired, and returned to service.	
USS Ingraham	United States Navy	22 August 1942	A Gleaves-class destroyer that collided with USS Chemung.	
La Bourgogne	France	4 July 1898	A French ocean liner that sank in a collision off the coast of Sable Island, with a loss of 549 lives.	
HMCS Long Branch	Royal Canadian Navy	1966	A Flower-class corvette that was scuttled off the coast of Nova Scotia.	
Lord Clarendon	(United Kingdom of Great Britain and Ireland) Canada	13 November 1851	A wooden cargo ship that ran aground at Low Point in Sydney harbour.	
Maria	United Kingdom	10 May 1849	An Irish famine ship which sank in Cabot Strait. They sailed from Limerick, Ireland for Quebec, carrying a crew of 10 plus 111 Irish emigrants. Sailing near midnight in a severe storm, the sailing ship sank immediately when it hit an iceberg, about 50 miles (80 km) from St. Paul Island. Only 12 on board survived.	
Mont-Blanc	France	6 December 1917	A freighter that collided with Imo in Halifax Harbour, causing a fire that detonated her cargo of military explosives. The resulting Halifax Explosion killed an estimated 2000 people, and fragments of Mont-Blanc were scattered across Halifax and Dartmouth.	44°40′09″N 63°35′47″W
Patrick Morris	Canada	20 April 1970	A Canadian National Railways train ferry that sank in a storm off the northeast coast of Cape Breton Island while assisting in a search and rescue operation for the sinking fishing trawler Enterprise. Four crew, including the captain, were lost.	46°50′N 59°56′W
Prudent	France	22 July 1758	A French warship burned following the siege of Louisbourg.	
Reo II	Canada	22 February 1985	A former rum runner and Royal Canadian Navy minesweeper, scuttled 35 miles (56 km) northeast of Halifax, Nova Scotia.	
HMCS Saguenay	Maritime Command	1994	A St. Laurent-class destroyer scuttled as an artificial reef off Lunenburg.	
Sankaty	Canada	1964	A steamboat that sank en route to be sold for scrap at Sydney.	
Tikoma	Canada	25 May 1909	A barque that ran aground off Pictou.	
HMS Tribune	Royal Navy	16 November 1797	A frigate that sank off Herring Cove.	44°33′59.2″N 63°33′11.7″W
Two Friends		22 October 1805	A sailing ship wrecked on the coast of Cape Breton Island.	
U-548	Kriegsmarine	19 April 1945	A Type IXC/40 U-boat that was sunk by USS Reuben James and USS Buckley southeast of Nova Scotia.	42°19′N 61°45′W
U-754	Kriegsmarine	31 July 1942	A Type VIIC U-boat that was sunk by depth charges near Yarmouth.	
U-866	Kriegsmarine	18 March 1945	A Type IXC/40 U-boat that was sunk by American destroyer escorts southeast of Nova Scotia, Canada.	43°18′N 61°08′W
USS West Gate	United States Navy	7 October 1918	A cargo ship that collided with the U.S. Navy cargo ship USS American 250 nmi (460 km; 290 mi) south of Halifax.	40°35′N 63°48′W
Unknown	Royal Navy	14 November 1760	A troopship that carried members of the 43rd (Monmouthshire) Regiment of Foot.	

== Nunavut ==
Ship	Flag	Sunk date	Notes	Coordinates
Breadalbane	United Kingdom	21 August 1853	A British barque sent to resupply Sir Edward Belcher's expedition to locate the missing Franklin expedition. Crushed by ice south of Beechey Island, August 1853. Found in Barrow Strait, August 1980.	74°41′N 91°50′W
HMS Erebus	Royal Navy	After 22 April 1848	A Hecla-class bomb vessel that was used for Arctic exploration, flagship of Sir John Franklin's lost expedition. Abandoned in Victoria Strait, April 1848. Found in Wilmot and Crampton Bay, September 2014.	
HMS Fury	Royal Navy	25 August 1825	A Hecla-class bomb vessel that was used for Arctic exploration, and was abandoned in Prince Regent Inlet.	
Maud	Canada	1930	An Arctic exploration vessel that froze up at Cambridge Bay in 1926, whereafter she was used as a floating warehouse and wireless station until she sank four years later. In 2016 she was raised and in 2017 began her return to Norway.	69°07′08″N 105°01′12″W
Nascopie	Canada	21 July 1947	A steamship that was wrecked near Cape Dorset.	
HMS Terror	Royal Navy	After 22 April 1848	A Vesuvius-class bomb vessel that had participated in the Battle of Fort McHenry during the War of 1812, and later used for Arctic exploration. Part of Sir John Franklin's lost expedition. Abandoned in Victoria Strait, April 1848. Found in Terror Bay, September 2016.	

== Ontario ==
Ship	Flag	Sunk date	Notes	Coordinates
115	United States	18 December 1899	Ran aground on Pic Island.	48°41′53.48″N 86°39′16.48″W
America	United States	5 April 1854	The sidewheel steamer ran aground on Pelee Island.	41°49′N 82°38′W
Arches		11 November 1852	Also known as Oneida, the package freighter sank in a storm off Long Point.	42°27′N 80°01′W
Argo	United States	20 October 1937	The tank barge sank off Pelee Island with a cargo of heavy crude and benzole; considered one of the greatest pollution risks on the Great Lakes. Discovered in 2015.	41°38′N 82°30′W
Argus	United States	9 November 1913	Wreckage found near Bayfield	
Atlantic	United States	20 August 1852	Paddlewheel steamer rammed and sunk off Long Point in the fifth-worst single-vessel disaster to ever occur on the Great Lakes.	42°30′N 80°05′W
Brown Brothers		1959	Sank off Long Point.	42°37′N 80°00′W
Bruce	Canada	1875	A 99-foot (30 m) wooden rear paddle wheeler steamership that caught fire in front of the Rideau Canal in the Ottawa River and sank in Ottawa. It was relocated under the Rideau Canoe Club wharf at the beginning of the 1980s. Only the hull can be seen.	45°26′06″N 75°42′01″W
Conestoga	United States	22 May 1922	A wooden cargo ship that caught fire and sank off Cardinal.	
Eastcliffe Hall	Canada	14 July 1970	A bulk carrier that sank in the Saint Lawrence River near Morrisburg.	
Edmund Fitzgerald	United States	10 November 1975	Edmund Fitzgerald was a 729-foot-long (222 m) freighter that sank of an unknown cause in a storm on Lake Superior. The Edmund Fitzgerald is the largest ship to sink on the lakes.	46°59.91′N 85°06.61′W
Glen Isle	Canada	1930	A 105-foot (32 m) schooner that caught fire and sank off Kettle Island, opposite Gatineau.	45°16′58″N 75°22′53″W
Ivy	Canada	1890	A 100-foot (30 m) paddle sidewheeler that caught fire, exploded and sunk at dock in Gatineau.	45°15′20″N 75°25′21″W
James B. Colgate	United States	20 October 1916	A whaleback steamer that sank off Long Point, in a storm that also took Merida and Marshall F Butters. 25 people were lost, with one survivor. Wreckage was located in 1991.	42°05′N 81°44′W
Jean Richard	Canada	1987	A 96-foot (29 m) wooden schooner, formerly Ville de Vanier, that was abandoned.	45.265580°N 75.421730°W
J.G. McGrath		28 October 1878	Foundered off Long Point.	42°40′N 79°23′W
John B. King	Canada	1930	A drill-boat containing dynamite which was struck by lightning, resulting in an explosion which killed thirty people.	44.56283°N 75.71179°W
J. S. Seaverns	United States	10 May 1884	Sank off Michipicoten, no lives lost. Wreck discovered in 2016.	47.9502778°N 84.87743611°W
Lillie Parsons	Canada	5 August 1877	A schooner that hit rocks and sank near Brockville.	44.55618°N 75.71878°W
Lycoming		21 October 1910	The steamer burned at her dock in Morpeth.	c
Maggie Bell	Canada	1874	The wooden paddle steamer sank in Ottawa	45.275287°N 75.402961°W
Manasoo	Canada	1928	Discovered 200 feet below the Georgian Bay in excellent condition with a 1927 Chevrolet Coupe inside.	
Mansfield	Canada	1896	The 104-foot (32 m) steamer caught fire and sank in Ottawa	45.264186°N 75.413805°W
Mary Ward	Canada	24 November 1872	A steamboat wrecked on a reef near Collingwood.	
Mayflower	Canada	12 November 1912	The vessel sank in Kamaniskeg Lake in a winter storm, with nine people killed.	
Merida		16 October 1916	A Ward Line steamer that sank off Long Point in a storm that also took James B. Colgate and Marshall F. Butters.	42°13′N 81°20′W
Metamora	Canada	30 September 1907	A wooden tug that burned to the waterline near Pointe au Baril, Georgian Bay.	45°31′43.39″N 80°24′26.61″W
Minnie	Canada	1930	The 95-foot (29 m) barge leaked and sank in Ottawa at the west exit of the eight locks of the Rideau Canal, near Parliament Hill	22.4525595°N 41.945°W
HMS Nancy	Royal Navy	14 August 1814	A schooner that was scuttled in the Nottawasaga River to prevent capture, during the War of 1812.	44.519214°N 80.019951°W
Otter	Canada	1870	The 102-foot (31 m) tugboat caught fire and sank in Ottawa at the west exit of the eight locks of the Rideau Canal, near Parliament Hill	
Oxford	(United Kingdom of Great Britain and Ireland) Canada	30 May 1856	Sank after a collision off Long Point.	42°28′N 79°51′W
Pascal P. Pratt		1908	Ran aground off Long Point.	42°33′N 80°05′W
Princess Louise	Canada	1883	Wrecked in the Flood of 1883, London, Ontario.	
Quinte Queen	Canada	1920	A 100-foot (30 m) wooden steamship, formerly Salaberry, that leaked and sank in Ottawa.	45.2752°N 75.4021°W
Resolute	Canada	1890	The 56-foot (17 m) tugboat caught fire and sank in Ottawa	54.4526858°N 75.41612°W
Robert		26 September 1982	The tug sank after a collision off Chatham-Kent.	42.25°N 81.81°W
R.R. Foster	Canada	1948	A 78-foot (24 m) ship that leaked and sank in Ottawa.	45.282670°N 75.374600°W
Sand scow	Canada	6 August 1918	Stranded on the Canadian side of Niagara River above Horseshoe Falls.	
Scotiadoc	Canada	20 June 1953	Rammed by the freighter Burlington in heavy fog off Trowbridge Island, near the Sleeping Giant.	48.271936°N 88.949157°W
HMS Speedy	Royal Navy	8 October 1804	A schooner that sank off Brighton, Lake Ontario.	43.814°N 76.789°W
HMS St Lawrence	Royal Navy		A wooden warship that served in the War of 1812. The ship was decommissioned and her hull was used as a storage facility by Morton's Brewery in Kingston. In January 1832, the hull was sold to Robert Drummond for £25. Later, it was sunk close to shore, and is now a popular diving attraction.	44°13′14″N 76°30′18″W
Sweepstakes	Canada	September 1885	A schooner that sank at Big Tug Harbour after being damaged in August 1885.	
HMS Toronto	Royal Navy	1811	A schooner that sank off Hanlan's Point, Toronto Islands, Lake Ontario.	
True North II	Canada	16 June 2000	A glass-bottomed tour boat that sank in Georgian Bay, killing two students.	
Victoria	Canada	1881	A ferry that capsized and sank near London, Ontario, with the loss of 181 lives.	
Waubuno	Canada	22 November 1879	A side-wheel paddle steamer lost in a storm in Georgian Bay.	45°07′15″N 80°09′58″W
William King	(United Kingdom of Great Britain and Ireland) Canada	1841	A 95-foot (29 m) paddle wheeler that was abandoned and sank in Ottawa.	45.4526141°N 75.42026°W
HMS Wolfe (later HMS Montreal)	Royal Navy		A freshwater sloop of war that served in the War of 1812. She was ordered broken up and sold in 1831, and is presumed to have rotted and sunk at Kingston. The wreck, identified as HMS Montreal by Parks Canada in 2006, lies near the Royal Military College of Canada.	44°13′N 76°27′W
Wolfe Islander II	Canada	21 September 1985	Car ferry scuttled to provide scuba attraction off Dawson's Point, Wolfe Island	

== Prince Edward Island ==
Ship	Flag	Sunk date	Notes	Coordinates
HMS Alert	Royal Navy	1791	A 4-gun schooner that was wrecked in Charlottetown harbour or Hillsborough Bay, possibly salvaged and broken up in 1799.	
Eagle	Canada	1 September 1922	A cargo ship that was crushed by pack ice and sank 28 kilometres (15 nmi) off North Cape.	
George N Orr	United States	4 December 1917	A Great Lakes freighter sold by Canada to the United States for coastal service during World War I. After losing its steering gear off East Point she drifted until running aground off Savage Harbour.	
HMCS Assiniboine	Royal Canadian Navy	10 November 1945	Canadian River-class destroyer that was sold for scrap after seeing action in the Battle of the Atlantic and ran aground after breaking away from her tow off East Point.	
Marco Polo	Canada	22 July 1883	A clipper that ran aground on a beach at Cavendish.	
Olga	Canada	5 November 1906	A 1,100-tonne steel-hulled barque that ran aground and sank off Hermanville in the Yankee Gale of 1906.	
HMS Phoenix	Royal Navy	12 September 1882	A Doterel-class sloop that ran aground off East Point.	46°28.5′N 61°58′W
Sovinto	Canada	5 November 1906	A four-masted barque that ran aground and sank off Priest Pond in the Yankee Gale of 1906.	
True Friends	(United Kingdom of Great Britain and Ireland) Canada	25 September 1824	A passenger cargo ship that struck a reef and sank off East Point.	
Tunstall	Canada	11 May 1884	A steamer owned by Black Diamond Line, which was carrying coal from Pictou, Nova Scotia, to Montreal, Quebec, when it sank after being crushed in the ice off Covehead. All the crew aboard Tunstall made it safely ashore and the wreck is now a popular site for scuba divers.	

== Quebec ==
Ship	Flag	Sunk date	Notes	Coordinates
HMCS Charlottetown	Royal Canadian Navy	11 September 1942	A Flower-class corvette that was torpedoed and sunk off Cap Chat by U-517.	49°10′N 66°50′W
HMCS Chedabucto	Royal Canadian Navy	31 October 1943	A Bangor-class minesweeper that collided with Lord Kelvin off Rimouski.	48°14′N 69°16′W
Cimba	Canada	26 July 1915	A clipper that sank in fog near Pointe des Monts.	
RMS Empress of Ireland	United Kingdom	29 May 1914	A transatlantic ocean liner that was hit by the coal freighter SS Storstad in the Saint Lawrence River and sank with heavy loss of life.	48°37.5′N 68°24.5′W
HMS Leopard	Royal Navy	28 June 1814	A troopship that ran aground on Anticosti Island.	
CGS Montmagny	Canada	18 September 1914	A buoy/lighthouse tender that sank near Montmagny after a collision with the coal carrier Lingan. The incident left 15 dead (one navigation officer and two lightkeeper's families (wives and children)).	
Norsya	Canada	19 September 1953	Former HMCS Shulamite, renamed Norsya and later foundered off Matane.	
HMS Penelope	Royal Navy	27 April 1815	A fifth-rate frigate that ran aground and broke apart near Pointe-à-la-Frégate in Cloridorme.	
CGS Simcoe	Canada	7 December 1917	A buoy tender that sank in a storm near Iles-de-la-Madeleine with all hands on board (44 people).	
HMCS West York	Royal Canadian Navy	7 November 1945	A Flower-class corvette that was struck by Polaris at dock in Montreal.	

== Saskatchewan ==
Ship	Flag	Sunk date	Notes	Coordinates
City of Medicine Hat	Canada	7 June 1908	A paddle steamer that crashed into the newly built Traffic Bridge on the South Saskatchewan River.	

== Yukon ==
Ship	Flag	Sunk date	Notes	Coordinates
A. J. Goddard	Canada	22 October 1901	A sternwheeler that sank in a storm on Lake Laberge.	61.0259°N 135.1191°W
Klondike I	Canada	June 1936	A sternwheeler that hit a rock wall when going around a bend in the Yukon River. It then lost control, ran aground, and sank on a gravel bar.	61°40′17″N 134°52′22″W

== See also ==
- List of shipwrecks in the Great Lakes
