= Dudley Garrett =

Canadian ice hockey player (1924–1944)

- Born: July 24, 1924 Toronto, Ontario, Canada
- Died: November 24, 1944 (aged 20) HMCS Shawinigan, Cabot Strait, off Channel-Port aux Basques, Newfoundland
- Height: 5 ft 11 in (180 cm)
- Weight: 190 lb (86 kg; 13 st 8 lb)
- Position: Defence
- Shot: Left
- Played for: New York Rangers
- Playing career: 1942–1944

Dudley Morine "Red" Garrett (July 24, 1924 – November 24, 1944) was a Canadian professional ice hockey defenceman whose brief but promising career was cut short by war. During the 1942–43 season, he appeared in 23 games with the New York Rangers, showcasing potential as a steady defenceman. However, with World War II ongoing, Garrett enlisted in the Royal Canadian Navy, and his ship was torpedoed by German submarine U-1228 and sank rapidly, killing all 90 crew members on board. To honour his sacrifice and the career that might have been, the American Hockey League established the Dudley "Red" Garrett Memorial Award in 1947. The award is presented each year to the league's most outstanding rookie, preserving Garrett's legacy in the sport he loved.

== Biography ==
Garrett was born in Toronto, Ontario and educated at Hodgson Senior Public School, now known as Hodgson Middle School, located in North Toronto. He was a promising young hockey defenceman originally part of the Toronto Maple Leafs organization before being traded, along with Hank Goldup, to the Rangers in 1942 in a deal that brought future Hart Trophy winner Babe Pratt to Toronto. As World War II escalated, Garrett joined the Royal Canadian Navy and served as an able seaman aboard the Flower-class corvette HMCS Shawinigan. On November 24, 1944, during a convoy escort mission in the Cabot Strait during the Battle of the St. Lawrence, the ship was torpedoed by German submarine U-1228 and sank within minutes. Tragically, all 90 crew members on board perished, including seven officers and 83 ratings. To honour his memory and potential as a player, the American Hockey League established the Dudley "Red" Garrett Memorial Award in 1947, awarded annually to the league's top rookie.

== Career statistics ==
=== Regular season and playoffs ===
			Regular season					Playoffs
Season	Team	League	GP	G	A	Pts	PIM	GP	G	A	Pts	PIM
1940–41	Toronto Army Shamrocks	TIHL	—	—	—	—	—	—	—	—	—	—
1941–42	Toronto Marlboros	OHA	18	2	5	7	61	2	1	1	2	6
1941–42	Toronto Red Indians	TIHL	12	1	4	5	22	—	—	—	—	—
1942–43	New York Rangers	NHL	23	1	1	2	18	—	—	—	—	—
1942–43	Providence Reds	AHL	6	0	0	0	2	—	—	—	—	—
1942–43	Sydney Navy	NSDHL	1	0	0	0	2	—	—	—	—	—
1943–44	Toronto Navy	OHA Sr	13	0	1	1	12	—	—	—	—	—
1943–44	Cornwallis Navy	NSDHL	4	4	5	9	18	3	1	0	1	15
NHL totals			23	1	1	2	18	—	—	—	—	—

== See also ==
- List of ice hockey players who died during their playing career
