= Marsland =

Marsland may refer to:

== People ==
- Adam Marsland, American musician
- Edward Marsland (1923–1996), British academic
- Jim Marsland, Scottish footballer
- Richard Marsland (1976–2008), Australian comedy writer, actor, comedian and radio personality

== Places ==
- Marsland, Nebraska, an unincorporated community
- Marsland Formation, a geologic formation in Nebraska
- Marsland Valley, a nature reserve at the Cornwall-Devon border, England

== Ships ==
- SS Marsland, a number of ships with this name

== Airlines ==
- Marsland Aviation, an airline based in Khartoum, Sudan
