= SS Marsland =

A number of steamships were named Marsland, including:

- SS Marsland (1926), a British cargo ship in service 1926–33
- SS Marsland (1930), a British cargo ship in service 1930−33
- SS Marsland (1941), a British cargo ship in service 1951−60
