= Indian (ship) =

Several ships have been named Indian:

- HMS Indian (1805) was a Bermuda-built sloop launched in 1805. She captured several small privateers while on the West Indies and Halifax stations before the Royal Navy sold her in 1817. Her main claim to fame, however, is that she was the first command of future Rear-Admiral Charles Austen, who was also the brother of the famed novelist Jane Austen. After the Navy sold her she became the whaler Indian, for Samuel Enderby & Sons. She apparently sailed for them until the mid-1830s; she then sailed for other owners until mid-1847, for a total of nine whaling voyages since leaving naval service.
- Indian (1810 ship) was a merchant ship launched at Shields. Her first voyage was to transport convict convicts to Australia. She then became a West Indiaman. She wrecked with heavy loss of life on 8 December 1817.
- Indian (1814 ship) was launched in Massachusetts, possibly under the same name. She first appeared in British records in 1814, suggesting that she was a prize. She was Liverpool-based and traded widely, especially with South America. She was in Valparaiso in 1820 when news of the discovery of the South Shetland Islands and the sealing grounds there reached Valparaiso before it reached England. She sailed to the South Shetland Islands and gathered over 26,000 seal skins before returning to Liverpool. Thereafter, she returned to trading across the Atlantic. Her crew abandoned her in a waterlogged state on 17 August 1827.
- Indian (1815 ship) was launched in 1813 in New York, possibly under another name. She entered British records in 1815, probably as a prize. In 1820 she sailed to Valparaiso. While in the Pacific, she rescued three survivors from the whaler Essex. At Chile, she got caught up in the conflict between Spain and the independence movement in Peru and Chile. She was condemned at Valparaiso in March 1821.
- Indian (1820 ship) was launched at Workington. She traded widely, and between 1828 and 1831 or so made several voyages to Singapore, Batavia, and Manila under a license from the British East India Company (EIC). She was wrecked around 1843.

== See also ==
- HMS Indian – any one of three vessels of the British Royal Navy
