= MV Patrick Morris =

Patrick Morris en route to North Sydney, NS from Port-aux-Basques, NL in 1965

MV Patrick Morris was a train ferry regulated by the Canadian National Railway (CN) that sank on her run from North Sydney, Nova Scotia to Port aux Basques, Newfoundland during a storm in the early morning of 20 April 1970 while responding to a mayday call from the Newfoundland-based herring seiner FV Enterprise. The ship's Captain Roland Penney was given permission to leave North Sydney ahead of schedule to assist the distressed wood-hulled fishing vessel. No passengers were aboard Patrick Morris when she set sail shortly before midnight for the rescue mission on 19 April.

== Construction ==
Built for the West India Fruit and Steamship Company by Canadian Vickers Ltd. of Montreal, Quebec in 1951, the 460-foot vessel was named New Grand Haven and operated as a railcar ferry between Palm Beach, Florida and Havana, Cuba until 1959 when Fidel Castro came to power in Cuba and business declined due to the United States Trade Embargo. In 1961, the company sold all six of its ferries.

The Government of Canada bought New Grand Haven, converted her to diesel, and renamed her Patrick Morris to honour Irishman Patrick Morris, a Newfoundland colonial politician and reformer. The ship was affectionately known by the nickname Paddy Morris; she became CN's first train ferry to serve the North Sydney-Port aux Basques route.

== Loss ==
Patrick Morris departed North Sydney, NS shortly before midnight on 19 April before her regularly scheduled departure time and headed to the last reported position of Enterprise. Around daybreak, her crew spotted a body in the water that was presumed to be that of a crew member from the fishing vessel. In the process of maneuvering to recover the body, Patrick Morris was overwhelmed when struck by a 30 ft (9.1 m) wave that smashed through rail car loading doors at the stern causing the ferry to take on water. Patrick Morris sent out her own mayday call at 6:51 am and sank 35 minutes later. Of her crew of 51 officers and sailors, 47 survived. Captain Penney, Chief Engineer David Reekie, Second Engineer Joseph Henry Slayman and Third Engineer Ronald A. Anderson were lost . All eight crewmen perished from Enterprise. The wreck of Patrick Morris lies in the Cabot Strait approximately 15 nmi (28 km) east of Cape Smokey at a depth of 300 ft (91 m).
