= John B. King explosion =

History

Canada
- Name: John B. King
- Launched: 1863
- Fate: Sank June 26, 1930

General characteristics
- Length: 140 ft (43 m)
- Beam: 50 ft (15 m)

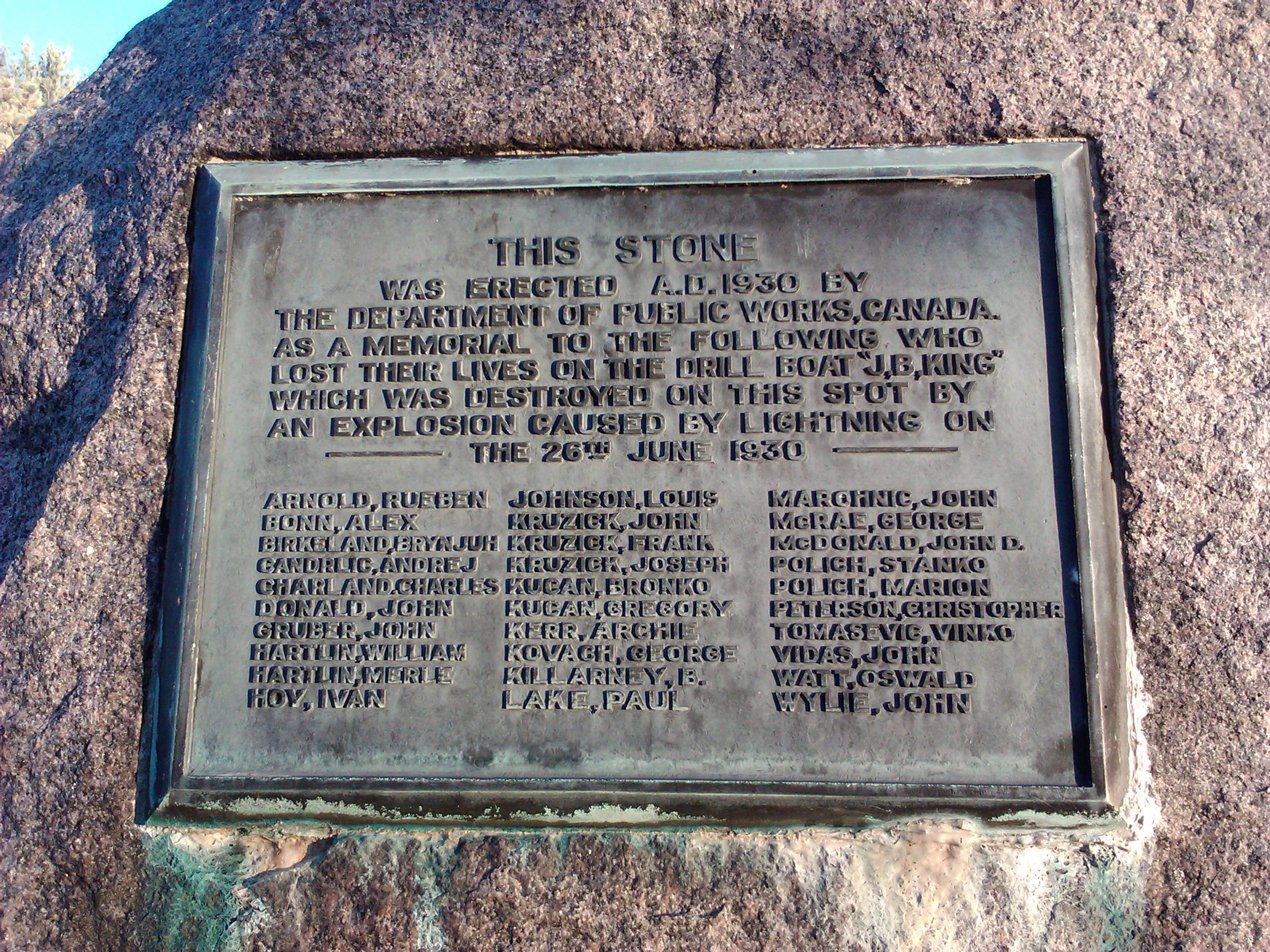
Memorial plaque on Cockburn Island to those who lost their lives in the explosion and sinking of the John B. King drill boat

John B. King explosion
- Date: June 26, 1930
- Time: 16:30 EST
- Location: Brockville, Ontario; 44.56283°N 75.71179°W
- Cause: Lightning
- Casualties: 30

The John B. King explosion was a Canadian maritime disaster on June 26, 1930, when a drill boat containing dynamite was struck by lightning near Brockville, Ontario. Thirty people were killed.

The scow was off the point of Cockburn Island working on blasting a St Lawrence Seaway channel through Brockville narrows, and had drilled several holes of dynamite. At 4:30 pm, while it was drilling another, a bolt of lightning struck the boat, travelling down the drill, and igniting the dynamite on the river floor.

The explosion was witnessed by United States Coast Guard Cutter 211, which then rescued 12 members of the crew of 42.

A memorial plaque was erected on the north-west corner of Cockburn Island by the Department of Public Works Canada in 1930.

The wreck is now located west of Cockburn Island at a depth of 80 feet. It is a popular dive site, and some divers have lost their lives while diving the wreck.

== See also ==
- RMS Empress of Ireland
