= Train ferry =

Ferryboat carrying railroad cars onboard

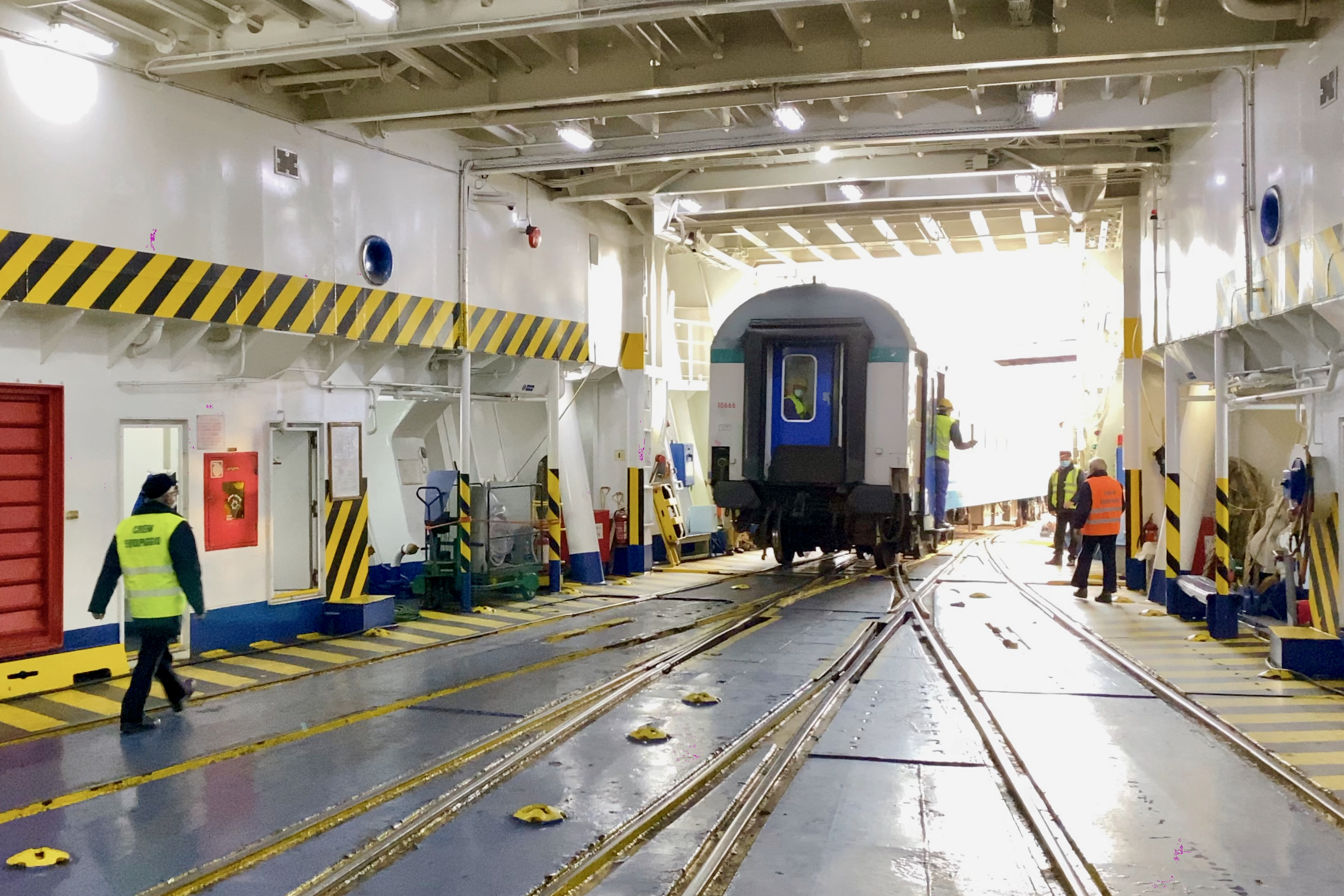
Interior of a roll-on roll-off train ferry in Villa San Giovanni, Italy

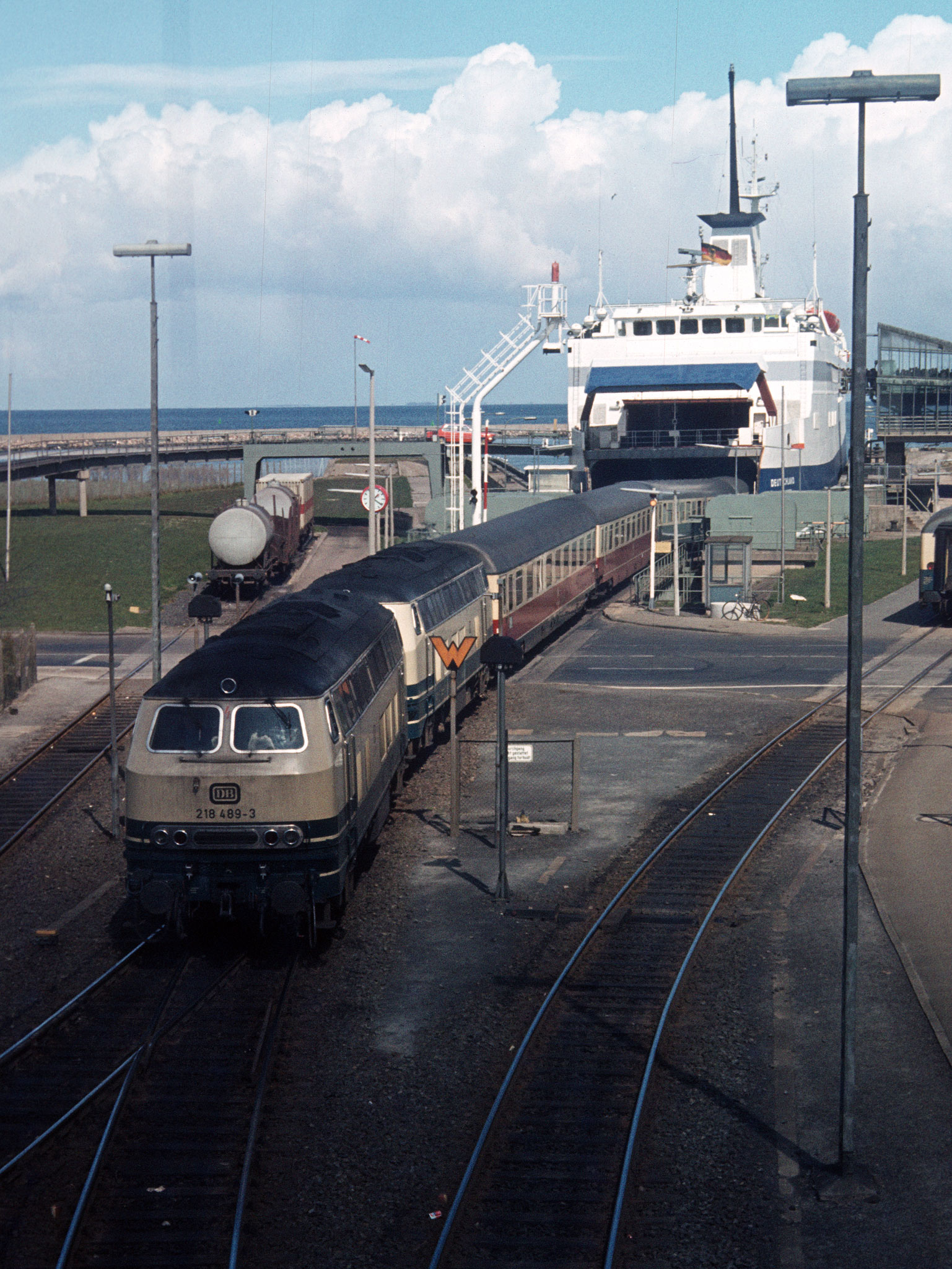
Railway ferry, Puttgarden, Germany

A train ferry is a ship (ferry) designed to carry railway vehicles, as well as their cargoes and passengers. Typically, one level of the ship is fitted with railway tracks, and the vessel has a door at the front or rear to give access to the wharves. In the United States, train ferries are sometimes referred to as "car ferries", as distinguished from "auto ferries" used to transport automobiles. The wharf (sometimes called a "slip") has a ramp, and a linkspan or "apron", balanced by weights, that connects the railway proper to the ship, allowing for tidal or seasonal changes in water level.

While railway vehicles can be and are shipped on the decks or in the holds of ordinary ships, purpose-built train ferries can be quickly loaded and unloaded by roll-on/roll-off, especially as several vehicles can be loaded or unloaded at once. A train ferry that is a barge is called a car float or rail barge. Some train ferries are considered pure train ferries that only carry rail traffic, whereas others are defined as train/vehicle ferries that also carry vehicles.

== History ==
An early train ferry was established as early as 1833 by the Monkland and Kirkintilloch Railway. To extend the line over the Forth and Clyde Canal in Scotland, the company began operating a wagon ferry to transport the rolling stock over the canal. In April 1836, the first railroad car ferry in the U.S., Susquehanna, entered service on the Susquehanna River between Havre de Grace and Perryville, Maryland.

The first modern train ferry was Leviathan, built in 1849. The Edinburgh, Leith and Newhaven Railway was formed in 1842 and the company wished to extend the East Coast Main Line further north to Dundee and Aberdeen. As bridge technology was not yet capable enough to provide adequate support for the crossing over the Firth of Forth, which was roughly five miles (8 km) across, a different solution had to be found, primarily for the transport of goods, where efficiency was key. The company hired the up-and-coming civil engineer Thomas Bouch who argued for a train ferry with an efficient roll-on roll-off mechanism to maximise the efficiency of the system. Custom-built ferries were to be built, with railway lines and matching harbour facilities at both ends to allow the rolling stock to easily drive on and off the boat. To compensate for the changing tides, adjustable ramps were positioned at the harbours and the gantry structure height was varied by moving it along the slipway. The wagons were loaded on and off with the use of stationary steam engines. Although others had had similar ideas, it was Bouch who first put them into effect, and did so with an attention to detail (such as design of the ferry slip). This led a subsequent President of the Institution of Civil Engineers to settle any dispute over priority of invention with the observation that "there was little merit in a simple conception of this kind, compared with a work practically carried out in all its details, and brought to perfection." The company was persuaded to install this train ferry service for the transportation of goods wagons across the Firth of Forth from Burntisland in Fife to Granton. The ferry itself was built by Thomas Grainger, a partner of the firm Grainger and Miller. The service commenced on 3 February 1850. It was called "The Floating Railway" and intended as a temporary measure until the railway could build a bridge, but this was not opened until 1890, its construction delayed in part by repercussions from the catastrophic failure of Thomas Bouch's Tay Rail Bridge.

In 1878, the Solano train ferry began operating in the United States across Carquinez Strait remaining in service until 1930 when a bridge was built. In 1899, the SS Baikal train ferry was assembled in Russia to link the eastern and western portions of the Trans-Siberian Railroad across Lake Baikal. The ferry had been built in Newcastle upon Tyne then disassembled and shipped in 7,000 crates to its assembly location inside Russia.

Switzerland has a long history of train ferry usage beginning in the 1860s. Between 1869 and 1976, train ferries also existed on Lake Constance. The Lake Constance train ferries linked lakeside railway stations in Austria (Bregenz), Germany (Friedrichshafen Hafen, Konstanz, Lindau-Insel) and Switzerland (Romanshorn).

From 1936 until 1977 (except during the Second World War), the Night Ferry from Dover was a train ferry that connected the UK with France and the rest of Europe.

The Japanese train ferry Toya Maru sank during Typhoon Marie on 26 September 1954, killing more than a thousand. Four other train ferries, Seikan maru No.11, Kitami Maru, Tokachi Maru and Hidaka Maru also sank on that day; the loss appeared to be of about 1,430 people. At the time, Japanese train ferries did not have a rear seagate, because engineers believed that in-rushing water would simply flow out again quickly and would not pose a danger. However, when the frequency of waves bears the wrong relationship to the length of a ship, each wave arrives as the water from the previous wave is trying to leave, causing water to accumulate on the ship. After the accidents, all Japanese train ferries were retrofitted with rear seagates and weather forecast technology was greatly promoted.

The Norwegian train ferry Skagerrak built in 1965, sank in gale-force winds on 7 September 1966, on a journey between Kristiansand, Norway, and Hirtshals, Denmark, when the rear seagate was destroyed by heavy seas. One person subsequently died of injuries, and six freight cars and a number of automobiles sank to the bottom with the ship. Many more passengers would have died but for the actions of the Royal Danish Airforce who managed to use helicopters to rescue 144 people.

The Canadian train ferry MV Patrick Morris sank on 20 April 1970, while assisting in a search-and-rescue operation for a sinking fishing trawler (MFV Enterprise) off the northeast coast of Cape Breton Island. The ferry was trying to maintain position to retrieve a body when its stern gates were overpowered by 30-foot (9.1 m) waves. It sank within 30 minutes taking several rail cars and 4 crew members, including the Captain, to the bottom of the Cabot Strait. There were 47 survivors.

In 1998, the largest train ferry ever was built, the MS Skåne on the Trelleborg-Rostock route, is 200 meters (660 ft) long, 29 meters (95 ft) wide, with six tracks plus two on an elevator to the lower deck, having a total length of track of 1,110 meters (3,640 ft).

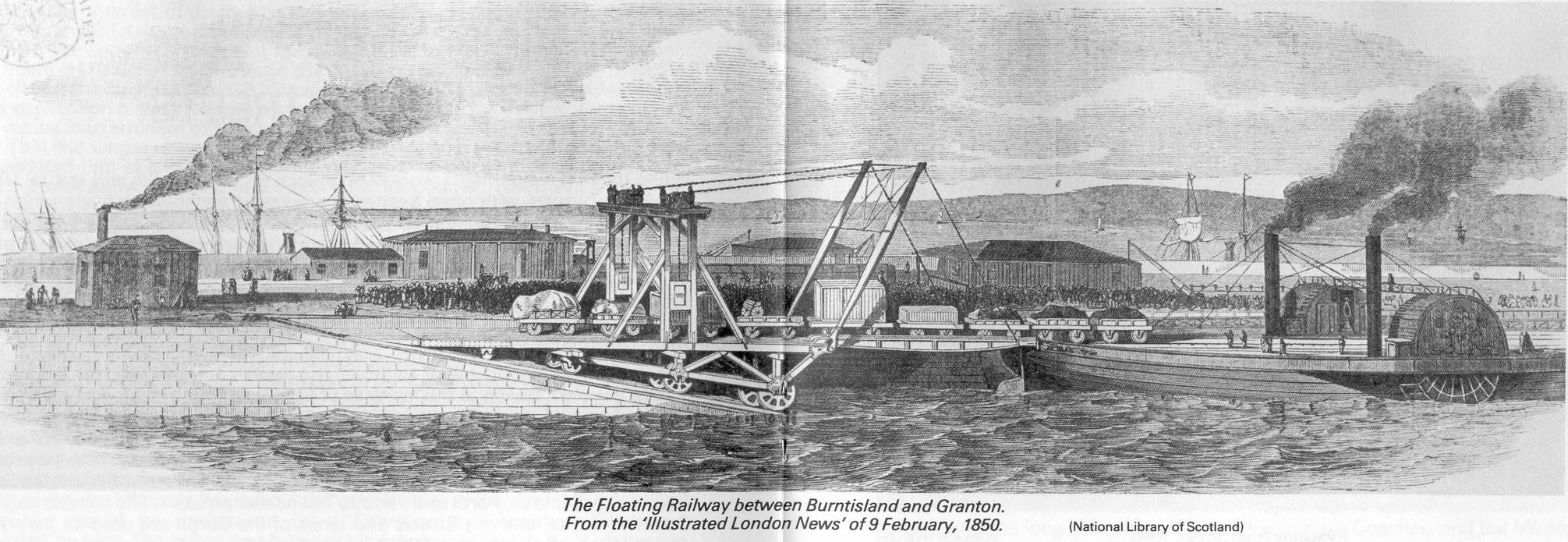
The 'Floating Railway', opened in 1850 as the first roll-on roll-off train ferry in the world.

Bouch's ferry design. Note the adjustable ramp of the Granton train ferry.

== Current services ==
Many train ferry services ceased their operations around the world. There are several services that are still in use in Azerbaijan, Bolivia, Bulgaria, Canada, China, Germany, Georgia, Iran, Italy, Mexico, New Zealand, Peru, Russia, Sweden, Tanzania, Turkey, Turkmenistan, Uganda, Ukraine, and United States. Some of these are RORO train ferries that carry passenger trains. Some are for freight transportation only.

== Hazards ==
Train ferries rarely sink because of sea hazards, although they have some weaknesses linked to the very nature of transporting trains "on rail" on a ship.

These weaknesses include:

- Trains are loaded at a rather high level, making the ship top-heavy. (Although modern train ferries often have truck decks above the train deck, making them less top-heavy)
- The train deck is difficult to compartmentalise, so that sloshing flood water can destabilize the ship. However, train ferries are often built as "large barges", partly with open train deck, with the superstructure above, meaning the water will pour out into the sea again. Car ferries, on the other hand, usually have "normal hulls" with "holes" in them for loading; this design retains sloshing flood water within the ship
- The sea doors where the trains go in and out are a weakness, even if placed at the rear of the ship.
- The train carriages need to be strongly secured lest they break away and roll around, particularly on long, open-water routes. (The brakes are normally put on on long open-water routes)

The Ann Arbor Railroad of Michigan developed a system of making cars secure that was adopted by many other lines. Screw jacks were placed on the corners of the railcar and the car was raised slightly to take its weight off its wheels. Chains and turnbuckles were placed around the car frame and hooked onto the rails and tightened. Clamps were placed behind the wheels on the rails. Deckhands engaged in continual inspection and tightening of the gear during the crossing. This system effectively held the cars in place when the ship encountered rough weather.

Some accidents have occurred at the slip during loading, when stability can be a major problem. Train ferries often list when heavy cars are loaded onto a track on one side while the other side is empty. Normal procedure was to load half of a track on one side, all of the track on the other side, and then the rest of the original track. If this procedure was not followed, results could be disastrous. In 1909, SS Ann Arbor No. 4 capsized in its slip in Manistique, Michigan when a switching crew put eight cars of iron ore on its portside tracks. The crew got off without loss of life, but salvage operations were costly and time-consuming.

Several train ferries, including SS Milwaukee, SS Pere Marquette 18, and SS Marquette & Bessemer No. 2, have been lost on the Great Lakes. These losses, though causes remain unconfirmed, were attributed to seas boarding the unprotected stern of the ship and swamping it in a severe storm. As a result, seagates were required on all new ships and required to be retrofitted on older vessels. In addition, two wooden cross-lake railroad ferries caught fire and burned.

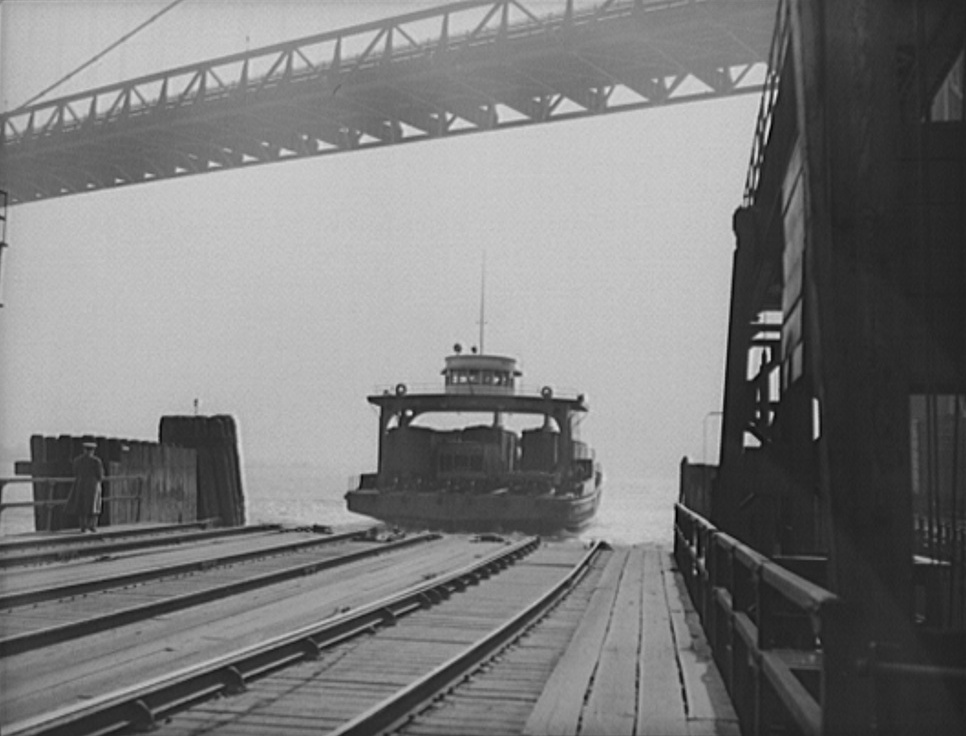
Loaded train ferry approaches dock in Detroit, Michigan, United States in April 1943. Photograph by Arthur Siegel.

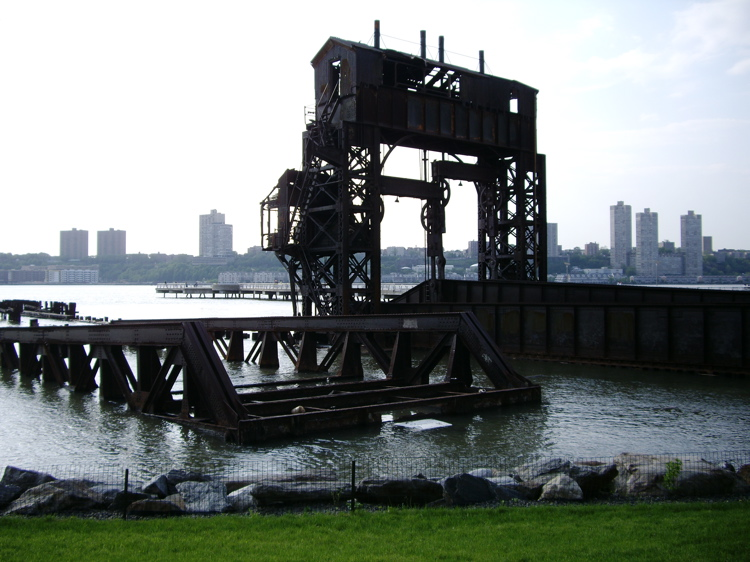
The New York Central Railroad 69th Street Transfer Bridge

== Gallery ==
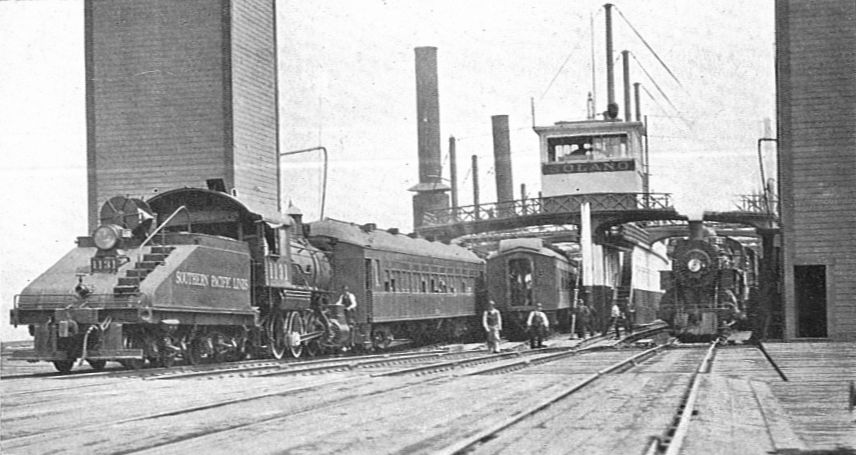
Locomotive with slopeback tender, loading the Sunset Limited onto the train-ferry Solano at Port Costa, San Francisco, Southern Pacific R.R.

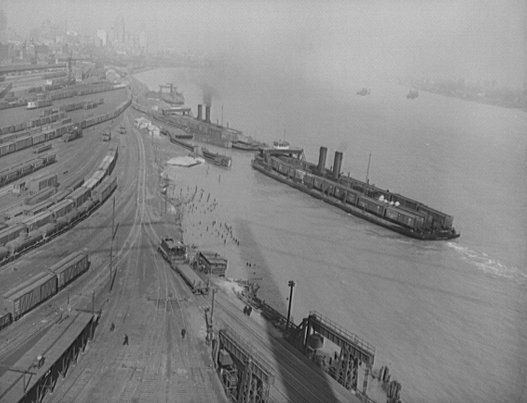
Classification yard and two docking train ferries in Detroit, April 1943. A third ferry slip can be seen at the bottom of the photograph. Photograph by Arthur Siegel.

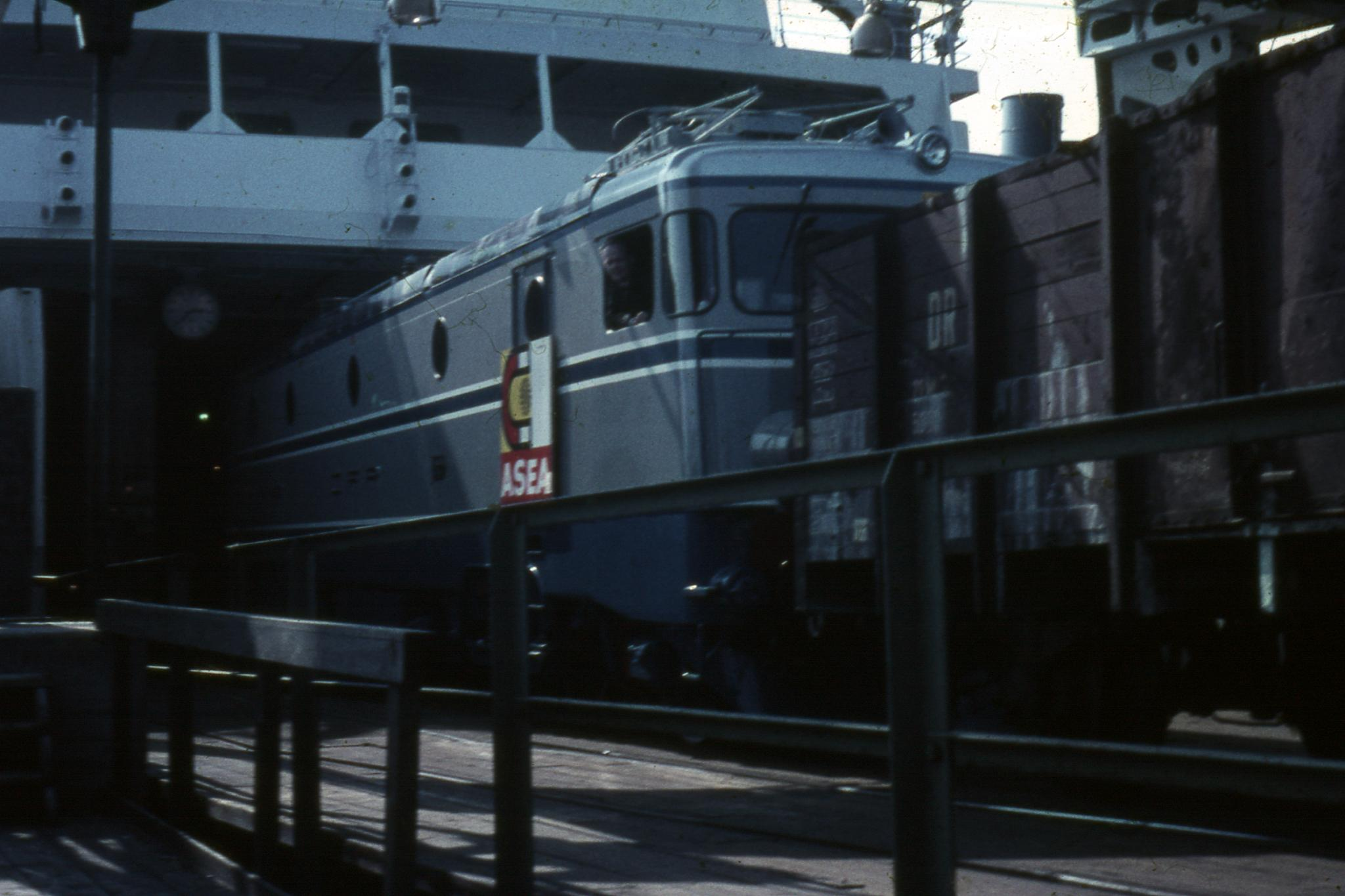
A CFR Class EA locomotive being loaded into the Trelleborg-Sassnitz railway ferry on its way from Västerås, Sweden to Brașov, Romania, 1966

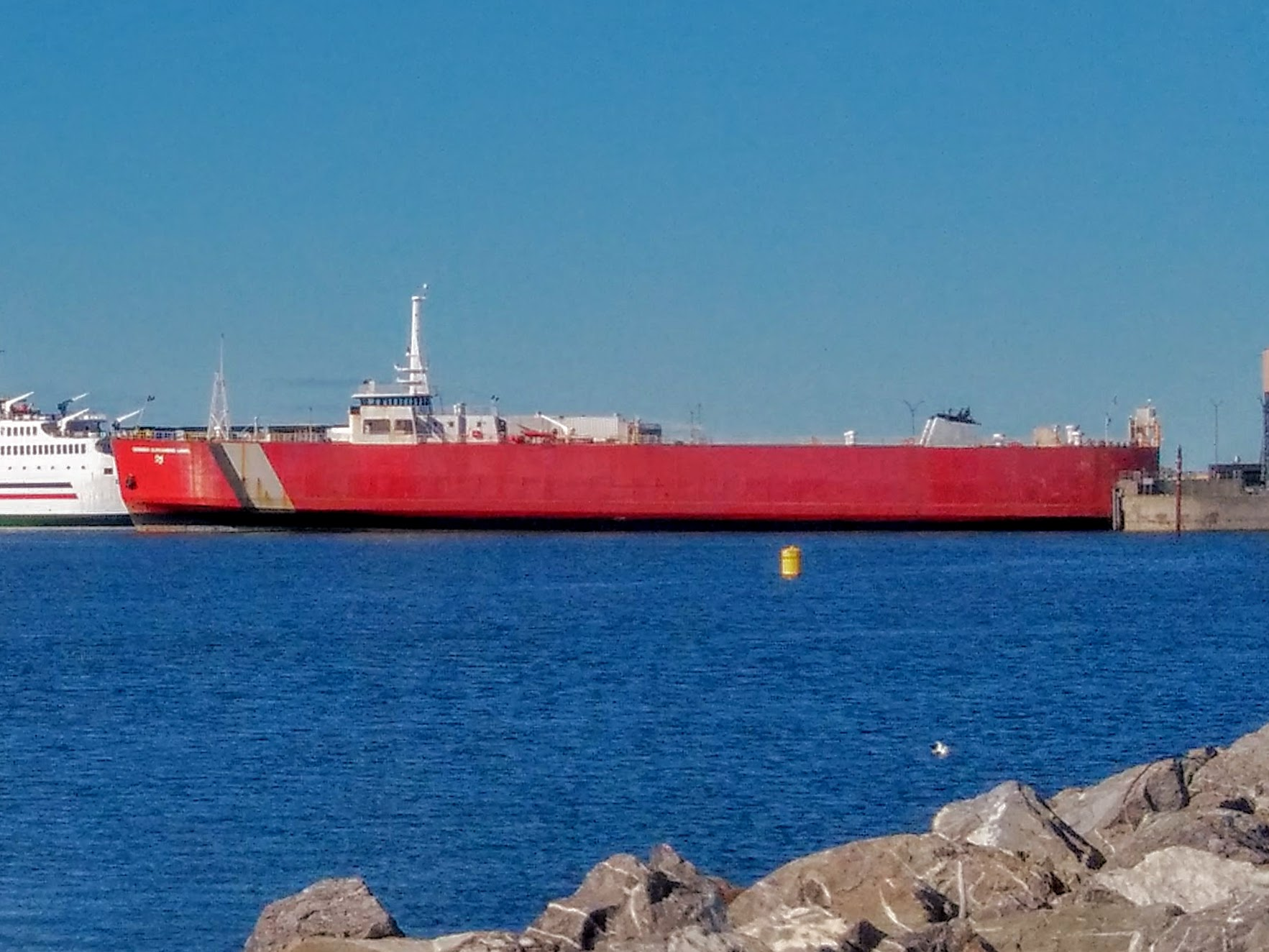
MV Georges-Alexandre-Lebel train ferry of the COGEMA in Matane, Canada

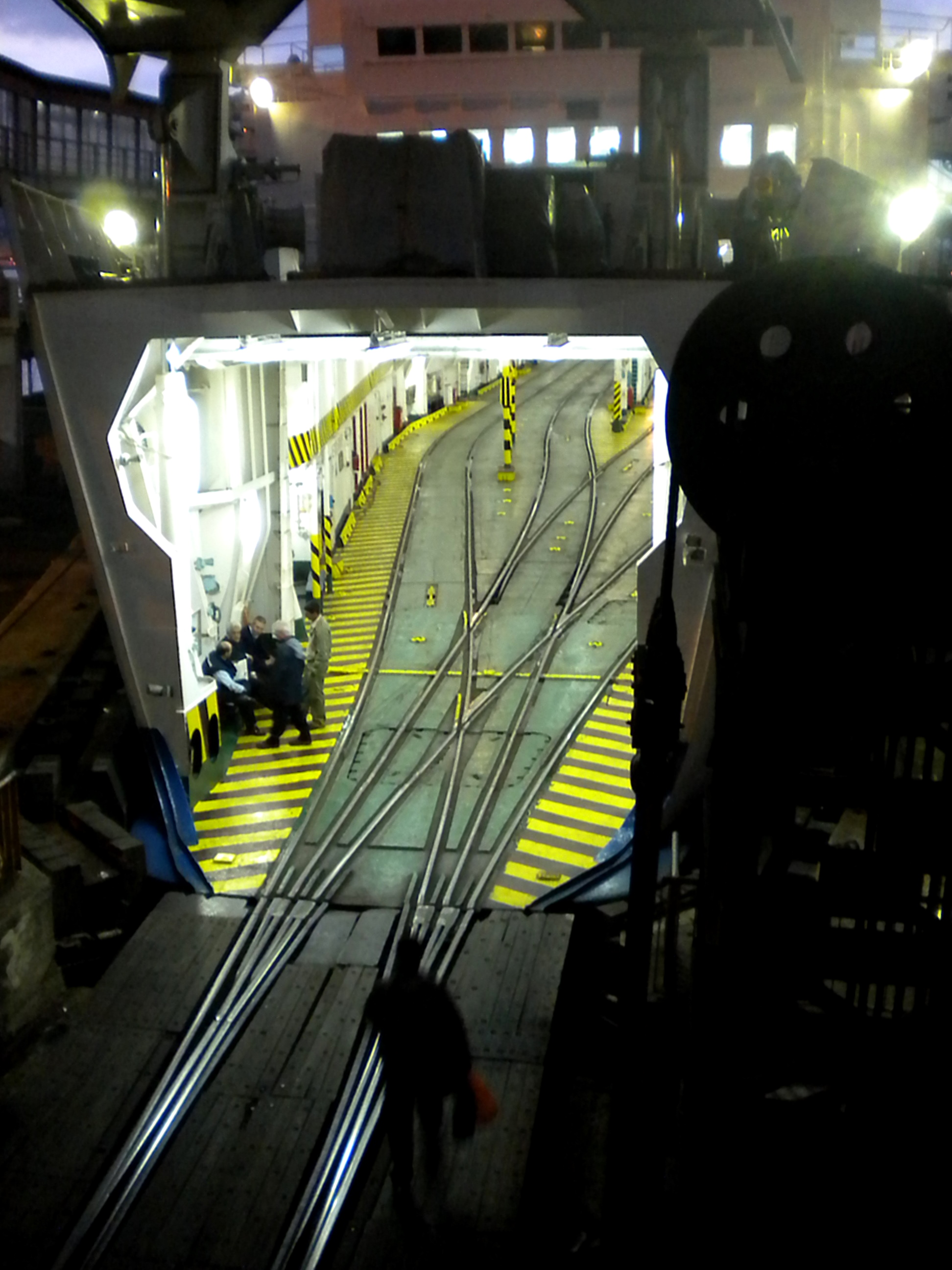
Train ferry and roll-on/roll-off between Calabria and Sicily

Loading and unloading operations of a RORO passenger train ferry, Strait of Messina, Italy

== See also ==
- Merchant ship
- Ferry slip (includes examples of rail ferry and barge slips)
- Linkspan
- List of road-rail bridges
- Portage railway, section of railway used to bypass a section of unnavigable river
- Roll-on/roll-off
- SS Badger, passenger and vehicle ferry in the United States that has been in Lake Michigan service from 1953 until the present
