= Two Friends (ship) =

History

United Kingdom
- Name: Two Friends
- Fate: Wrecked 22 October 1805

General characteristics
- Class & type: Sailing ship

Two Friends was a medium-sized wooden sailing ship that served the British government for transporting troops to garrisons across the British Empire during the Napoleonic Wars. On 22 October 1805 Two Friends was wrecked on the coast of Cape Breton Island with the loss of three lives.

== Convoy ==
A large collection of shipping gathered in the port of Falmouth, Cornwall with the intention of sailing across the Atlantic Ocean in convoy to supplement the garrison in Quebec with soldiers of the 100th Regiment of Foot. In addition to this unit, replacements for regiments already in British North America, the families of the soldiers being sent abroad, several government officials, and numerous private passengers also took passage.

The ships were a mix of small warships, government-owned transports, and private merchantmen gathered together with the hope of safety in numbers from the large number of French privateers which were operating against British shipping during the War of the Third Coalition at the time. The disadvantage to this plan was that should some crisis befall the convoy, the damage would be substantially more serious than if it had occurred amongst independently sailing ships. The convoy departed Falmouth on 29 August 1805, expecting to make landfall in Canada sometime towards the end of September.

The passage was substantially worse than had been anticipated, with the convoy experiencing severe autumn storms in the North Atlantic, with strong winds and heavy seas. This caused a serious delay in the arrival of the convoy, resulting in the exhaustion of the ships' food and fresh water supplies and causing a surge in the spread of infectious diseases, especially in the packed troopships. The first ships began to make landfall scattered across the Canadian coast on 20 October with Two Friends being lost off the south coast of Cape Breton Island on the 22nd and Aeneas on the 23rd off the coast of Newfoundland.

== Wreck ==
Two Friends was carrying around 80 passengers, 40 soldiers, 30 crew and all the baggage and heavy equipment of the 100th Regiment. Early in the morning of 22 October, the ship was driven ashore by high winds and in dense fog on the south coast of Cape Breton Island close to Louisbourg.

Two Friends lost her masts and frantic efforts were made to prevent it drifting off into deep water, where it would have sunk with all hands. Some hours after it was wrecked, local people spotted the disaster and made dozens of trips in small boats to the battered ship, managing to rescue all but three of those aboard, who had drowned in an effort to reach the shore some hours before. Later in the day, the remains of the ship drifted off the reef and sank in deep water, taking all of the regiment's equipment with it.
