= Yankee Gale =

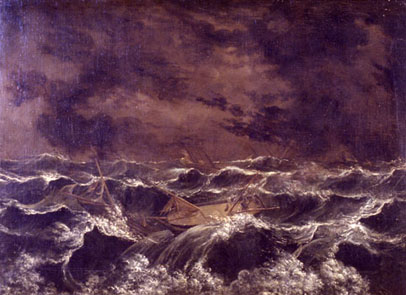
Painting of a scene during the Yankee Gale

The Yankee Gale was a major storm in the Gulf of St. Lawrence near Prince Edward Island, Canada, that began on the night of October 3, 1851 and continued for two days. It is considered the worst marine disaster in the history of the island. In addition to local ships, the storm wrecked much of the New England fishing fleet that was working in the waters, giving the gale its name. At least 74 ships were destroyed, and 150 crew were killed.

== General Description ==
A detailed description of the gale was published by James D. Lawson in the Prince Edward Island Magazine. This account cited a favorable weather with a cloudless sky and gentle winds. Other accounts would detail how a brassy appearance was witnessed in the northwest sky on the afternoon of October 3. Long swells started moving into the Gulf of St. Lawrence from the southeast, as the wind began to pick up out of the same quarter. The wind backed to the northeast that evening, increasing to gale force. Surface pressures across the region begin to fall rapidly, with one barometer on Nova Scotia falling by 31 hPa or mb/nearly 1 inch within 23 hours. The gales continued for nearly two days, according to one of the sea captain's logs from the area.

The Yankee Gale occurred less than six months after a previously devastating gale called Minot's Light Storm hit the Gulf of St. Lawrence and destroyed the lighthouse off Cohasset.

== Effects ==
On land the cyclone had minimal effect, but out at sea the storm was significantly more damaging. Ships at sea realized a storm was approaching, and tried to sail east of Prince Edward Island. Northeast gales blocked their progress. Ships attempted to hold position, but their sails tore away in the wind, and they drifted towards the island. Ships at anchor either sank at anchor or were capsized by other ships ramming them during the cyclone. Most of the American fishing fleet fell victim to the storm. At least 74 ships and 150 lives were lost. Today, the tombs of the Yankee Gale victims can still be found in the cemetery near the Cape Tryon lighthouse.
