= German submarine U-1228 =

German World War II submarine

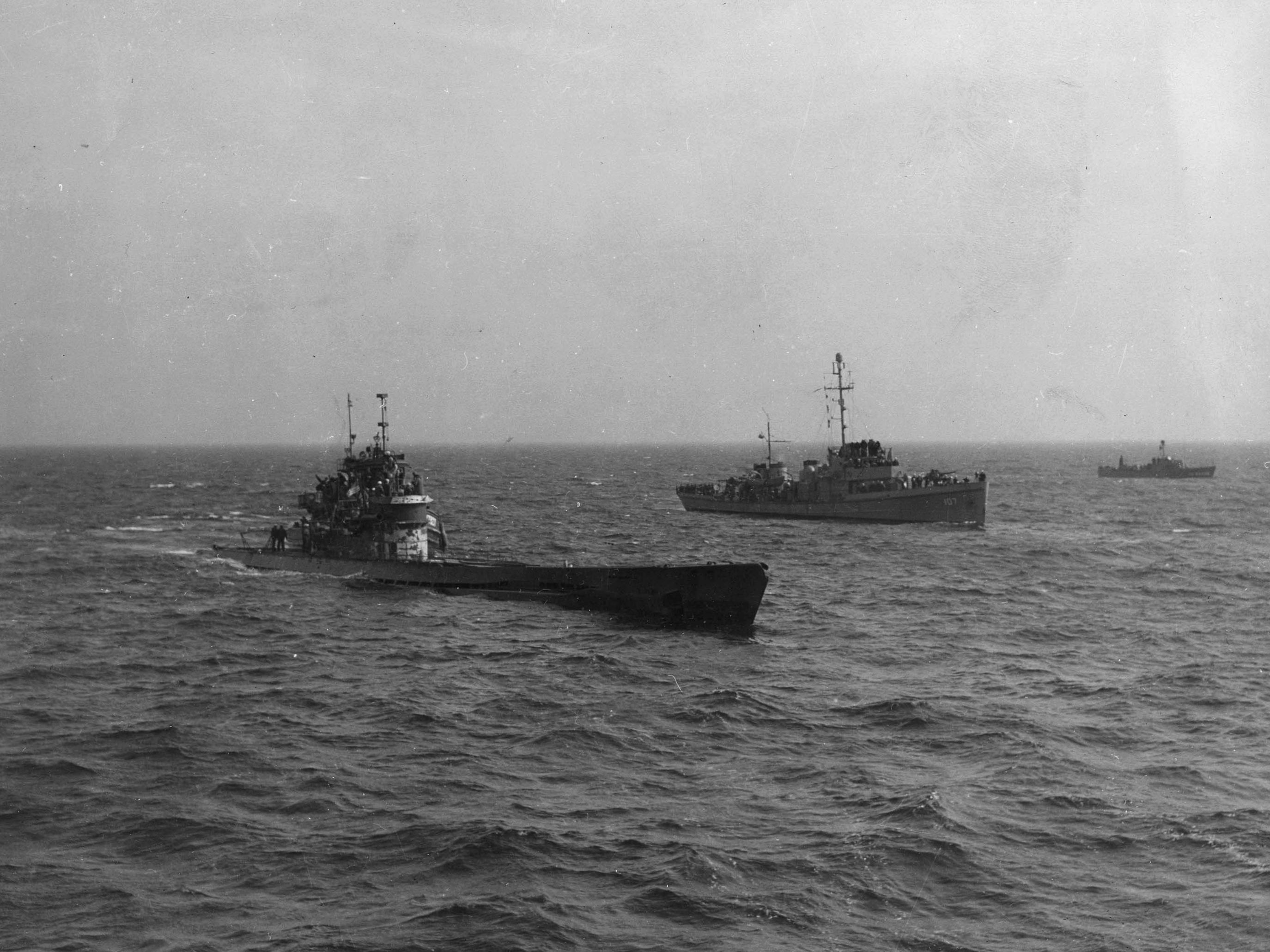
- U-1228 surrenders at Portsmouth, New Hampshire on 17 May 1945 escorted by USCGC Dione (center)

History

Nazi Germany
- Name: U-1228
- Ordered: 14 October 1941
- Builder: Deutsche Werft AG, Hamburg
- Yard number: 391
- Laid down: 16 February 1943
- Launched: 2 October 1943
- Commissioned: 22 December 1943
- Fate: Surrendered on 17 May 1945; Sunk on 5 February 1946 by US warships in position 42°32′N 69°37′W

General characteristics
- Class & type: Type IXC/40 submarine
- Displacement: 1,144 t (1,126 long tons) surfaced; 1,257 t (1,237 long tons) submerged
- Length: 76.76 m (251 ft 10 in) o/a; 58.75 m (192 ft 9 in) pressure hull
- Beam: 6.86 m (22 ft 6 in) o/a; 4.44 m (14 ft 7 in) pressure hull
- Height: 9.60 m (31 ft 6 in)
- Draught: 4.67 m (15 ft 4 in)
- Installed power: 4,400 PS (3,200 kW; 4,300 bhp) (diesels); 1,000 PS (740 kW; 990 shp) (electric)
- Propulsion: 2 shafts; 2 × diesel engines; 2 × electric motors
- Speed: 18.3 knots (33.9 km/h; 21.1 mph) surfaced; 7.3 knots (13.5 km/h; 8.4 mph) submerged
- Range: 13,850 nmi (25,650 km; 15,940 mi) at 10 knots (19 km/h; 12 mph) surfaced; 63 nmi (117 km; 72 mi) at 4 knots (7.4 km/h; 4.6 mph) submerged
- Test depth: 230 m (750 ft)
- Complement: 4 officers, 44 enlisted
- Armament: 6 × torpedo tubes (4 bow, 2 stern); 22 × 53.3 cm (21 in) torpedoes; 1 × 3.7 cm (1.5 in) Flak M42 AA gun; 2 x twin 2 cm (0.79 in) C/30 AA guns

Service record
- Part of: 31st U-boat Flotilla; 22 December 1943 – 31 July 1944; 2nd U-boat Flotilla; 1 August – 31 October 1944; 33rd U-boat Flotilla; 1 November 1944 – 8 May 1945
- Identification codes: M 55 286
- Commanders: Oblt.z.S. Friedrich-Wilhelm Marienfeld; 22 December 1943 – 17 May 1945
- Operations: 3 patrols: 1st patrol: a. 11 – 15 September 1944; b. 17 – 20 September 1944; 2nd patrol: a. 12 October – 29 December 1944; b. 31 December 1944 – 4 January 1945; c. 1 – 3 April 1945; d. 9 – 11 April 1945; 3rd patrol: 14 April – 17 May 1945
- Victories: 1 warship sunk (900 tons)

German submarine U-1228 was a Type IXC/40 U-boat built for Nazi Germany's Kriegsmarine during World War II.

== Design ==
German Type IXC/40 submarines were slightly larger than the original Type IXCs. U-1228 had a displacement of 1,144 tonnes (1,126 long tons) when at the surface and 1,257 tonnes (1,237 long tons) while submerged. The U-boat had a total length of 76.76 m (251 ft 10 in), a pressure hull length of 58.75 m (192 ft 9 in), a beam of 6.86 m (22 ft 6 in), a height of 9.60 m (31 ft 6 in), and a draught of 4.67 m (15 ft 4 in). The submarine was powered by two MAN M 9 V 40/46 supercharged four-stroke, nine-cylinder diesel engines producing a total of 4,400 metric horsepower (3,240 kW; 4,340 shp) for use while surfaced, two Siemens-Schuckert 2 GU 345/34 double-acting electric motors producing a total of 1,000 shaft horsepower (1,010 PS; 750 kW) for use while submerged. She had two shafts and two 1.92 m (6 ft) propellers. The boat was capable of operating at depths of up to 230 metres (750 ft).

The submarine had a maximum surface speed of 18.3 knots (33.9 km/h; 21.1 mph) and a maximum submerged speed of 7.3 knots (13.5 km/h; 8.4 mph). When submerged, the boat could operate for 63 nautical miles (117 km; 72 mi) at 4 knots (7.4 km/h; 4.6 mph); when surfaced, she could travel 13,850 nautical miles (25,650 km; 15,940 mi) at 10 knots (19 km/h; 12 mph). U-1228 was fitted with six 53.3 cm (21 in) torpedo tubes (four fitted at the bow and two at the stern), 22 torpedoes, and a 3.7 cm (1.5 in) Flak M42 as well as two twin 2 cm (0.79 in) C/30 anti-aircraft guns. The boat had a complement of forty-eight.

== Service history ==
U-1228 was ordered on 14 October 1941 from Deutsche Werft in Hamburg-Finkenwerder under the yard number 391. Her keel was laid down on 16 February 1943 and the U-boat was launched on 2 October. About three months later she was commissioned into service under the command of Oberleutnant zur See Friedrich-Wilhelm Marienfeld (Crew X/38) in the 31st U-boat Flotilla on 22 December 1943.

After work-up for deployment, U-1228 transferred to the 2nd U-boat Flotilla and left Kiel for the West Atlantic on 5 September 1944 for her first and only patrol. Stopping briefly in Bergen, Norway, for replenishment, she experienced engine troubles in the Norwegian Sea and had to return to port. She set off again on 12 October from Bergen and operated in the Gulf of St. Lawrence sinking one warship, HMCS Shawinigan in the Cabot Strait on the night of 24 November 1944. All of Shawinigan's 90 crew members were lost, seven officers and 83 ratings including able seaman Dudley "Red" Garrett, a former Toronto Maple Leafs National Hockey League player.

She returned to Bergen on 28 December 1944 and continued her journey to Flensburg the same day. On 17 January 1945, she arrived in Wesermünde where she spent the next two months in the yard. U-1228 set out again on 1 April 1945 for operations in the West Atlantic. After the surrender of Germany, the U-boat made for the closest Allied port and surrendered to US forces in Portsmouth, New Hampshire on 17 May 1945.

In August 1945 U-1228 was awarded to the United States and after being tested, she was sunk by USS Sirago on 5 February 1946 in position 42°32′N 69°37′W.

== Summary of raiding history ==
Date	Ship Name	Nationality	Tonnage (Note: Merchant ship tonnages are in gross register tons. Military vessels are listed by tons displacement.)	Fate
25 November 1944	HMCS Shawinigan	Royal Canadian Navy	900	Sunk

== Bibliography ==
- Busch, Rainer; Röll, Hans-Joachim (1999). German U-boat commanders of World War II: a biographical dictionary. Translated by Brooks, Geoffrey. London, Annapolis, Md: Greenhill Books, Naval Institute Press. ISBN 1-55750-186-6.
- Busch, Rainer; Röll, Hans-Joachim (1999). Deutsche U-Boot-Verluste von September 1939 bis Mai 1945 [German U-boat losses from September 1939 to May 1945]. Der U-Boot-Krieg (in German). Vol. IV. Hamburg, Berlin, Bonn: Mittler. ISBN 3-8132-0514-2.
- Gröner, Erich; Jung, Dieter; Maass, Martin (1991). German Warships 1815–1945, U-boats and Mine Warfare Vessels. Vol. 2. Translated by Thomas, Keith; Magowan, Rachel. London: Conway Maritime Press. ISBN 0-85177-593-4.
