= Aeneas (troopship) =

History

United Kingdom
- Name: Aeneas
- Fate: Wrecked 23 October 1805

General characteristics
- Propulsion: Sailing ship

Aeneas was a wooden sailing ship named after the Trojan hero of the Iliad.

She was owned by the British government and used to transport troops to garrisons across the British Empire during the Napoleonic Wars. On 23 October 1805 Aeneas was wrecked on the coast of Newfoundland with terrible loss of life.

== Convoy ==
A large collection of shipping gathered in the English port of Falmouth with the intention of sailing across the Atlantic Ocean in convoy to supplement the garrison in Quebec with soldiers of the 100th Regiment of Foot. In addition to this unit, replacements for regiments already in British North America, the families of the soldiers being sent abroad, several government officials, and numerous private passengers also took passage.

The ships were a mix of small warships, government-owned transports, and private merchantmen gathered together with the hope of safety in numbers from the large number of French privateers which were operating against British shipping during the War of the Third Coalition at the time. The disadvantage to this plan was that should some crisis befall the convoy, the damage would be substantially more serious than if it had occurred amongst independently sailing ships. The convoy departed Falmouth on 29 August 1805, expecting to make landfall in Canada sometime towards the end of September.

The passage was substantially worse than had been anticipated, with the convoy experiencing severe autumn storms in the North Atlantic, with strong winds and heavy seas. This caused a serious delay in the arrival of the convoy, resulting in the exhaustion of the ships' food and fresh water supplies and causing a surge in the spread of infectious diseases, especially in the packed troopships. The first ships began to make landfall scattered across the Canadian coast on 20 October with Two Friends being lost off the south coast of Cape Breton Island on the 22nd.

== Wreck ==
The loss of Two Friends was unfortunate, but was nothing compared to the catastrophe which befell Aeneas the following day. The heavy transport had become totally separated from the main body of the convoy some time before, and was relying on her own navigation to make the Canadian coast in appalling weather. Crammed into her hold were 347 people consisting of soldiers of the 100th, many women and children from their families and the ship's crew.

At 4 a.m. on 23 October 1805, the ship went ashore somewhere near Cape Ray, Newfoundland in total darkness and raging wind. The exact location is unknown, but is believed to be a submerged reef close to the Isle aux Morts. The passengers poured on deck in a state of panic, which contributed to the disaster when a huge waves swept hundreds of struggling people into the sea. Within four hours, the ship had broken up, and 35 survivors were washed onto a tiny islet about half a mile from the scene of the disaster. An incredible back surge of water then carried any more survivors and all possible salvage from the ship far out to sea. Amongst this little band were two army officers, seven sailors and 26 soldiers, who spent the remains of the day building a raft.

By the next morning, five had died from exposure and three more were in a bad state when the raft made landfall on a desolate patch of coastline. Upon landfall, the three desperately ill men were abandoned by the main party, who walked south hoping to find succour. Two other sailors became separated from the group, and two soldiers volunteered to remain with one of the officers when he collapsed, whilst the remaining officer, Ensign Faulkner, led the remaining 21 survivors southwards.

A passing hunter, Michael Gilliam, who stayed in a hut during the summer collecting furs, discovered the three sick men, and with the help of the two detached sailors removed them to his hut, where the six remained for the winter. At some point they were joined by the two soldiers left guarding the officer, who had been discovered and rescued by a band of hunters after said officer perished.

In the spring of 1806, this band of hunters and survivors made their way to Fortune Bay, and from there to Quebec, where they were reunited with the remainder of their regiment and told the tale of the loss of Aeneas. Of Ensign Faulkner and his band, there has never been any sign. It is believed they perished somewhere in the deep woods, either of starvation or due to the advancing winter.

== Notes ==
The Newfoundland coast was and is notorious for wrecks and disasters of this kind, especially in this period, when it was sparsely inhabited and poorly mapped. There has been some discrepancy with the number of people killed in the wreck, with contemporary reports mentioning "230 souls" lost, despite the ship's manifest clearly stating 347 persons aboard, of which seven survived. This is probably simply an error caused by the long communication distances and questionable book-keeping prevalent at the time.
