= HMCS Shawinigan (K136) =

Flower-class corvette

Coordinates: 47°34′N 59°11′W

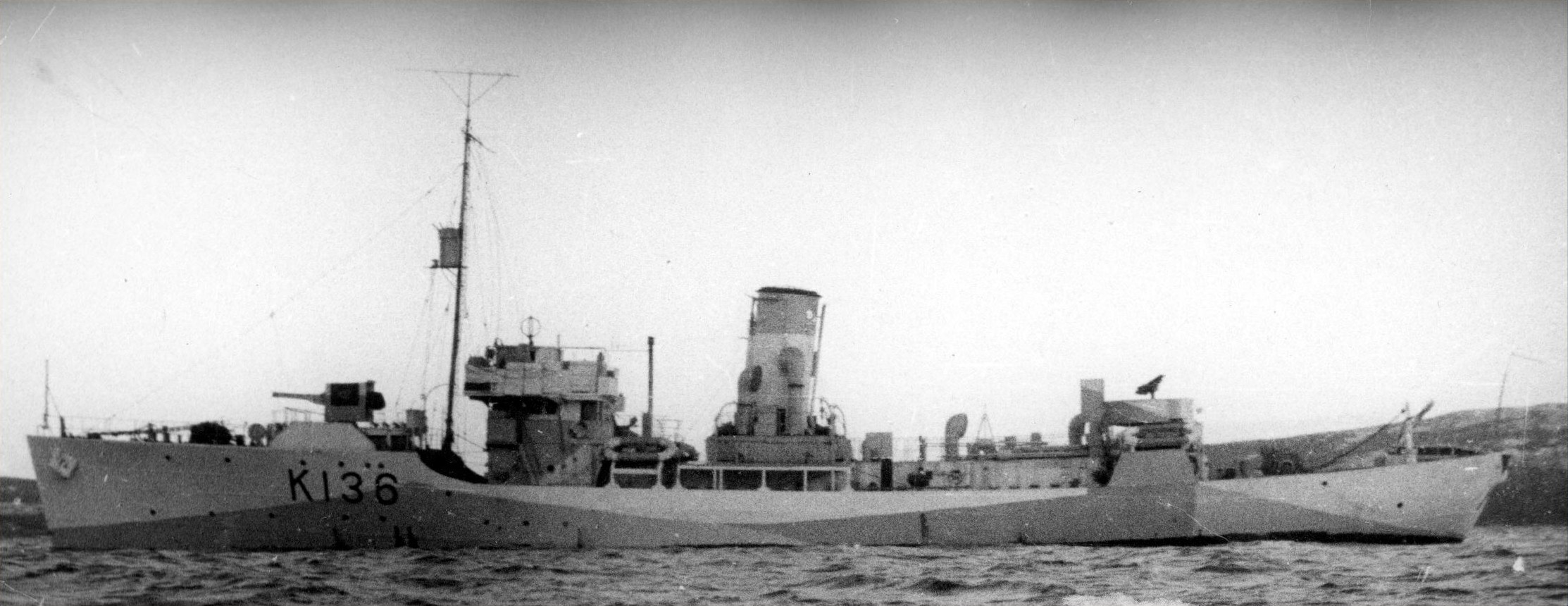
- Corvette HMCS Shawinigan c. 1942–1943

History

Canada
- Name: Shawinigan
- Namesake: Shawinigan, Quebec
- Ordered: 24 January 1940
- Builder: Davie Shipbuilding, Lauzon
- Laid down: 4 June 1940
- Launched: 16 May 1941
- Commissioned: 19 September 1941
- Out of service: 25 November 1944
- Identification: Pennant number: K136
- Honours and awards: Atlantic 1941–43, Gulf of St. Lawrence 1942, 1944
- Fate: Sunk 25 November 1944

General characteristics
- Class & type: Flower-class corvette (original)
- Displacement: 925 long tons (940 t; 1,036 short tons)
- Length: 205 ft (62 m) o/a
- Beam: 33 ft (10 m)
- Draught: 11.5 ft (3.5 m)
- Propulsion: single shaft; 2 × fire tube Scotch boilers; 1 × 4-cycle triple-expansion reciprocating steam engine; 2,750 ihp (2,050 kW)
- Speed: 16 knots (30 km/h)
- Range: 3,500 nautical miles (6,500 km) at 12 knots (22 km/h)
- Complement: 85
- Sensors & processing systems: 1 × SW1C or 2C radar; 1 × Type 123A or Type 127DV sonar
- Armament: 1 × BL 4 in (102 mm) Mk.IX single gun; 2 × .50 cal machine gun (twin); 2 × Lewis .303 cal machine gun (twin); 2 × Mk.II depth charge throwers; 2 × depth charge rails with 40 depth charges; originally fitted with minesweeping gear, later removed

HMCS Shawinigan was a Flower-class corvette that served with the Royal Canadian Navy during the Second World War. She served primarily in the Battle of the Atlantic protecting convoys. She was sunk in 1944. She was named for Shawinigan, Quebec.

== Background ==
Flower-class corvettes like Shawinigan serving with the Royal Canadian Navy during the Second World War were different from earlier and more traditional sail-driven corvettes. The "corvette" designation was created by the French as a class of small warships; the Royal Navy borrowed the term for a period but discontinued its use in 1877. During the hurried preparations for war in the late 1930s, Winston Churchill reactivated the corvette class, needing a name for smaller ships used in an escort capacity, in this case based on a whaling ship design. The generic name "flower" was used to designate the class of these ships, which – in the Royal Navy – were named after flowering plants.

Corvettes commissioned by the Royal Canadian Navy during the Second World War were named after communities for the most part, to better represent the people who took part in building them. This idea was put forth by Admiral Percy W. Nelles. Sponsors were commonly associated with the community for which the ship was named. Royal Navy corvettes were designed as open sea escorts, while Canadian corvettes were developed for coastal auxiliary roles which was exemplified by their minesweeping gear. Eventually the Canadian corvettes would be modified to allow them to perform better on the open seas.

== Construction ==
Shawinigan was ordered 24 January 1940 as part of the 1939–1940 Flower-class building program and laid down on 4 June 1940 by Davie Shipbuilding & Repairing Co. Ltd. at Lauzon, Quebec. However she was not launched until almost a year later on 16 May 1941. Shawinigan was commissioned on 19 September 1941 at Quebec City, Quebec.

== War service ==
Upon entering active service, Shawinigan joined Sydney Force in November 1941. She served there until transferring to the Newfoundland Escort Force on 13 January 1942. She made three round trips across the Atlantic before being assigned to Halifax Force in June 1942. She spent only a few months before being assigned to WLEF. Almost simultaneous with her new assignment, she went for a major refit that was completed in March 1943. In June she joined EG W-3. In April 1944 she underwent another refit and transferred to EG W-2 and worked up in Bermuda.

=== Sinking ===
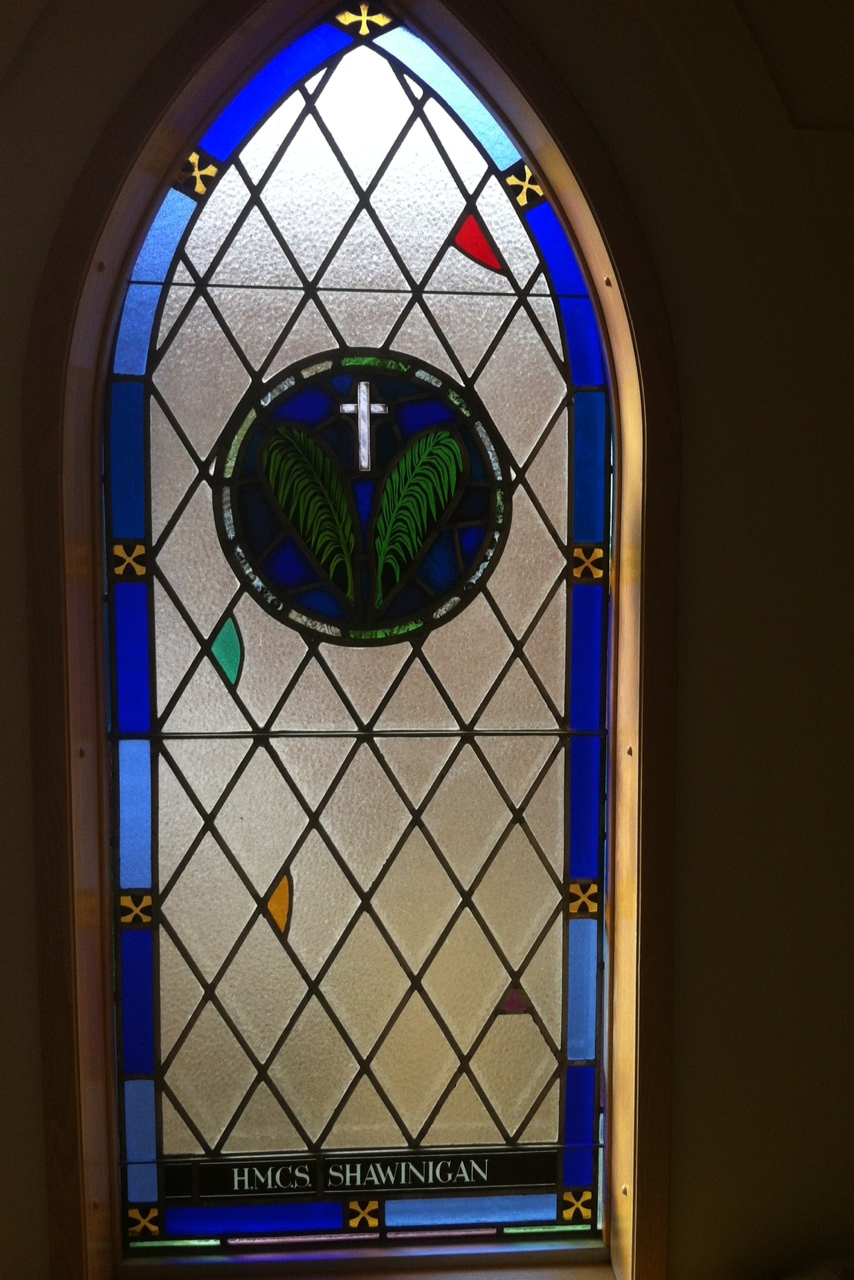
HMCS Shawinigan window CFB Halifax

On 24 November 1944 Shawinigan and USCGC Sassafras escorted the ferry Burgeo from Sydney to Port aux Basques. Sassafrass was detached from the escort without relief and Shawinigan was left alone. Shawinigan departed on an independent anti-submarine patrol and informed the ferry that it would meet her in the morning.

The next morning Burgeo left Port aux Basques on schedule but in the fog, could not find Shawinigan. Keeping radio silence and without informing command of Shawinigan's lack of appearance, Burgeo made for Sydney unescorted. When Burgeo arrived at Sydney, at six o'clock that night, the navy knew that something had happened to Shawinigan.

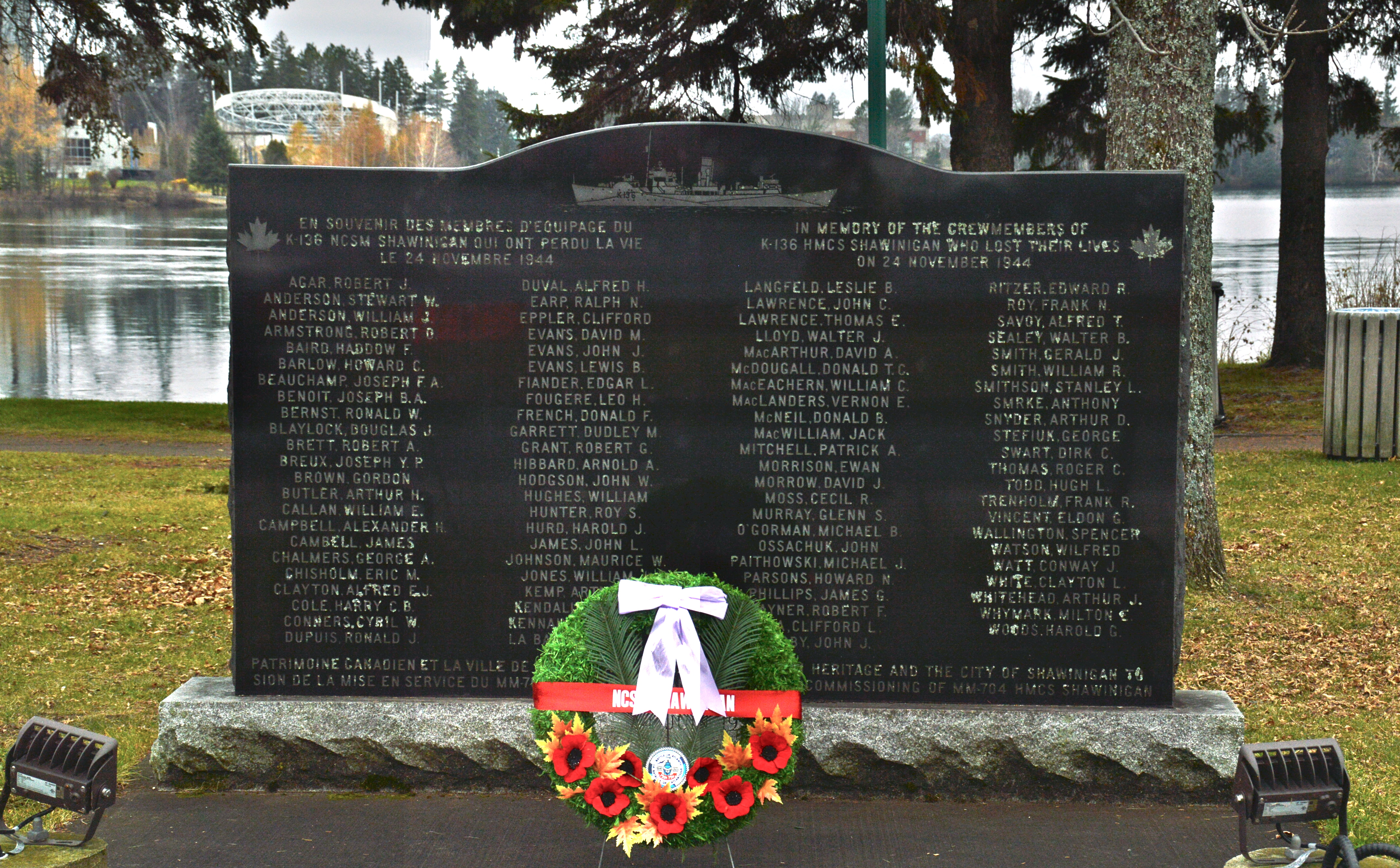
Monument in Shawinigan in memory of the crew of HMCS Shawinigan

Over the next three days searchers looked for survivors but could find only flotsam and, eventually, six bodies. Shawinigan had been torpedoed by the German submarine U-1228 during the night of 24 November in the Cabot Strait. All 90 crew members were lost including seven officers and 83 ratings including able seaman Dudley "Red" Garrett, a former Toronto Maple Leafs hockey player. The Canadian public didn't learn about the loss until almost two weeks later, when on 7 December 1944, Angus L. Macdonald, the minister of defence for naval services, told the press. At the time, Shawinigan was the ninth Canadian corvette to be sunk and the 19th warship lost overall.

=== Investigation ===
The fate of Shawinigan was initially unknown at the time of her disappearance; however, the Royal Canadian Navy (correctly) presumed that it had been sunk by a German submarine during the night of 24–25 November 1944, as German submarines were known to be operating in the area at the time. Shawinigan's fate was ultimately confirmed following the surrender of U-1228 to United States forces at Portsmouth, New Hampshire on 17 May 1945. A review of U-1228's logs disclosed that it had sunk an Allied warship at 0230 hours on 25 November 1944 in the same area where Shawinigan was lost, allowing the Royal Canadian Navy to conclude that U-1228 had torpedoed and sank Shawinigan. Records from U-1228's commanding officer, Friedrich-Wilhelm Marienfeld, disclosed further details of the engagement, including that U-1228 fired a single T-5 GNAT torpedo at Shawinigan, striking the corvette in the stern. Marienfeld further reported that Shawinigan sank almost immediately (in only four minutes), and that two further underwater explosions were heard from Shawinigan as it sank to the ocean floor. Based on U-1228's logs, and given the area where Shawinigan was ordered to patrol on the night of 24–25 November 1944, the Royal Canadian Navy estimated that Shawinigan sank in the vicinity of the three-mile limit off of Channel Head, near Port aux Basques. However, its final resting place was never found.

== See also ==
- List of current ships of the Royal Canadian Navy
- History of the Royal Canadian Navy
