= Indian (1820 ship) =

History

United Kingdom
- Name: Indian
- Launched: 1820, Workington
- Fate: Wrecked c.1843

General characteristics
- Tons burthen: 231 (bm)

Indian was launched at Workington in 1820. She traded widely, and between 1828 and 1831 or so made several voyages to Singapore, Batavia, and Manila under a license from the British East India Company (EIC). She was wrecked around 1843.

== Career ==
Indian first appeared in Lloyd's Register (LR) in 1820.

Year	Master	Owner	Trade	Source
1820	R.Fells	Woods & Co.	Workington–Liverpool	LR
1821	R.Fell; A.Morris	Wood & Co	Workington–Liverpool; Liverpool–Brazils	
1823	A.Morris	Buchanan	Liverpool–Buenos Aires	LR
1827	Eadie; Scott	Buchanan	London–Jamaica	LR
1829	W.Eadie; J.Harding	Wise	London–Batavia	LR
1830	J.Harding	Wise	Liverpool–Singapore	

In 1813 the EIC had lost its monopoly on the trade between India and Britain. British ships were then free to sail to India or the Indian Ocean under a license from the EIC.

On 27 July 1828 Captain Eadie sailed for Batavia and Singapore under a license from the EIC. Then on 31 October 1829 Captain Harding sailed there too. On 15 August 1831 Captain W. Ravenscroft sailed Indian to Batavia and Manilla.

Year	Master	Owner	Trade	Homeport	Source & notes
1835	L.Mackay	J.Ritson	Liverpool–Quebec	London; Maryport	LR
1840	J.Feiron	J.Ritson	Maryport–North America	Maryport	LR; small repairs 1839 & 1840
1843	J.Scott	J.Ritson	Maryport–Liverpool	Maryport	LR; small repairs 1839 & 1840

== Fate ==
Her entry in the 1842 volume of LR has the annotation "Wrecked" by her name.
