= SS Marsland (1926) =

English cargo vessel

History
- Name: Marsland
- Owner: Walmar Steamship Co.
- Operator: Kaye, Son and Co. Ltd.
- Port of registry: (United Kingdom of Great Britain and Ireland) London, England
- Builder: Rankin and Blackmore Ltd., Greenock, Scotland; Lithgows Ltd., Glasgow, Scotland
- Yard number: 777
- Launched: 23 September 1926
- Completed: November 1926
- In service: 1927
- Out of service: 2 July 1933
- Identification: Official Number 149741; Code Letters KVLR
- Fate: Ran aground 2 July 1933, sinking October 9, 1933

General characteristics
- Tonnage: 4,542 GRT
- Length: 385 ft (117 m)
- Beam: 52 ft (16 m)
- Depth: 26.6 ft (8.1 m)
- Installed power: T3cyl (26, 42, 70 x 48in), output: 465 nhp
- Propulsion: 1 screw
- Speed: 10 knots (19 km/h; 12 mph) max.

SS Marsland was an English cargo vessel, constructed in 1926. She is most notable for running aground and wrecking on the Vestal Rocks, at North Head, just outside the city of St. John's, Newfoundland.

== Service history ==
SS Marsland was constructed in 1926 by Lithgrows Ltd. in Glasgow, Scotland; her engine was constructed by Rankin and Blackmore Ltd. in Greenock, Scotland. She was owned by the Walmar Steamship Company and operated by Kaye, Son and Company Ltd.

Marsland was a frequent visitor to Newfoundland, often visiting St. John's and Corner Brook. She would primarily transport fishery salt from Europe to Newfoundland and would return to Europe carrying salt fish.

=== Grounding ===
In early July 1933, under the command of Capt. Williams, Marsland was en route from Cádiz, Spain, with a load of salt. Upon approaching the Narrows outside St. John's Harbour, on July 2, Capt. Williams noted there was significantly more traffic than usual. A small schooner cut in front of the Marsland, causing Capt. Williams to order the Marslands engines full astern and to wheel hard over. The Marsland swerved and successfully avoided the schooner, but the Marsland grounded on the Vestal Rocks just below Fort Amherst.

=== Attempted recovery ===
Within the hour, tugs Hugh D. and Mouton and the Arras arrived to assist. They attached hawsers and pulled from different directions. The crew of the Marsland quickly put to work dumping the salt cargo over the side to lighten the load and re-float the ship. This was to no avail, as she was firmly wedged between the Vestal Rocks. The ship's agents, Bowring Brothers, recruited the Reid Newfoundland Company steamers, SS Argyle and SS Meigle, to tow the Marsland free. This attempt failed, as the lines kept snapping, and pulled the Marsland on to her broad side and to the edge of an underwater cliff.

The Salvage Association deemed it necessary for an ocean tug to be recruited to free the Marsland. The SS Foundation Franklin arrived on July 9 with divers to assess the damage on the Marsland's hull. The vessel was boarded up, sealed off and the salvage team started pumps. Slowly, the Marsland began to regain some buoyancy. Waves caused the Marsland to crash into the rocks, damaging her hull faster than the salvage team could fix it. Poor weather caused the crew of the Foundation Franklin to abandon the effort and seek shelter in St. John's. After the storm cleared, insurers declared the Marsland a total loss. The crew of the Foundation Franklin retrieved their gear and stripped the Marsland of any remaining fittings and equipment. The Marsland was now sitting completely on her side.

It was rumoured that the visiting HMS Norfolk was going to blow up the Marsland; however, this never occurred.

=== Fate ===
In October 1933, a heavy storm battered the Marsland and she finally slid from the rocks, down the underwater cliff, coming to a rest on the ocean floor, just outside the Narrows.
