= Cabot Strait =

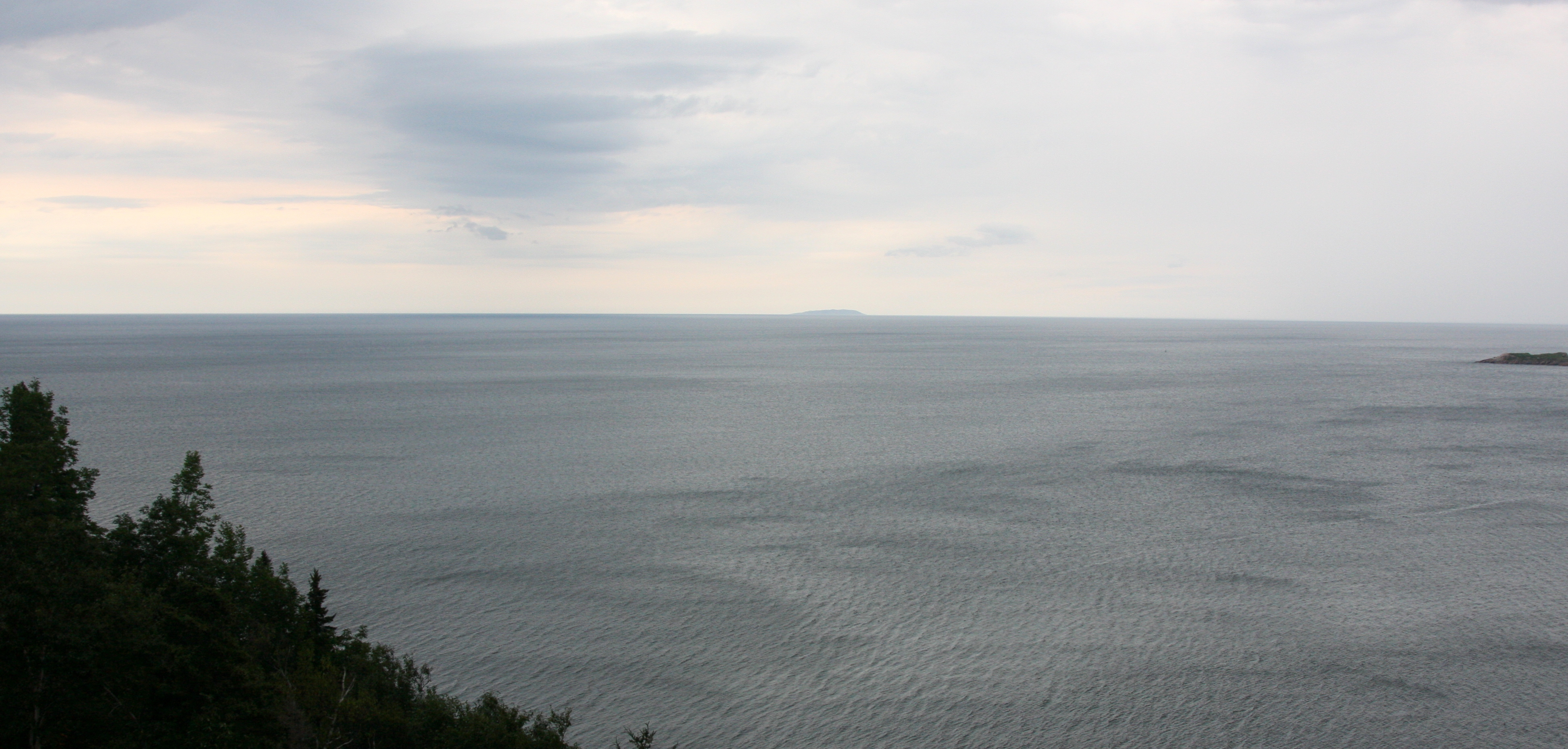
- Cabot Strait from White Point, Cape Breton Island. St. Paul Island in the distance.

- Cabot Strait
- Location: Cape Breton Island, Nova Scotia & Newfoundland
- Coordinates: 47°15′00″N 59°45′00″W
- Type: Channel
- Part of: Gulf of Saint Lawrence
- Ocean/sea sources: Atlantic Ocean
- Basin countries: Canada
- Max. length: 20 nautical miles (37 km; 23 mi)
- Max. width: 70 nautical miles (130 km; 81 mi)
- Max. depth: 550 metres (1,800 ft)
- Islands: St. Paul Island (Nova Scotia)
- Trenches: Laurentian Channel
- References: Geographical Names of Canada - Cabot Strait

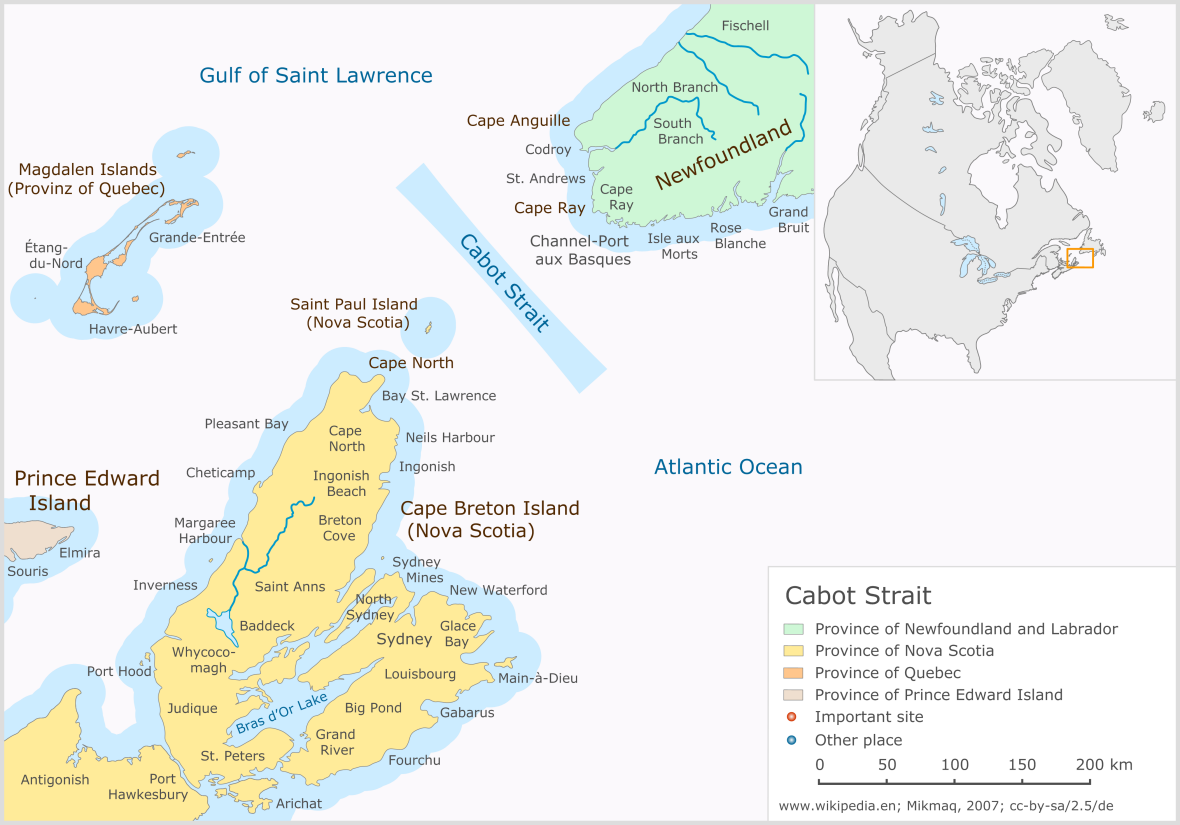
The Cabot Strait lies north of Cape Breton Island, Nova Scotia, Canada.

Cabot Strait (/ˈkæbət/; French: détroit de Cabot, French: [kabo]) is in Atlantic Canada between Cape Ray, Newfoundland, and Cape North, Cape Breton Island. The strait, approximately 110 kilometres wide, is the widest of the three outlets for the Gulf of Saint Lawrence into the Atlantic Ocean, the others being the Strait of Belle Isle and Strait of Canso. It is named for the Italian explorer Giovanni Caboto.

== Geography and geology ==
=== Bathymetry ===
The strait's bathymetry is varied, with the Laurentian Channel creating a deep trench through its centre, and comparatively shallow coastal waters closer to Newfoundland and Cape Breton Island. These bathymetric conditions have been known by mariners to cause rogue waves.

The steep slope of the Laurentian Channel was the site of a disastrous submarine landslide at the southeastern end of the strait, triggered by the 1929 Grand Banks earthquake and leading to a tsunami that devastated communities along Newfoundland's south coast and parts of Cape Breton Island.

=== St. Paul Island ===
An infamous location in the strait for shipwrecks during the Age of Sail, St. Paul Island came to be referred to as the "Graveyard of the Gulf" (of St. Lawrence).

== Shipping ==
A strategically important waterway throughout Canadian and Newfoundland history, the strait is also an important international shipping route, being the primary waterway linking the Atlantic with inland ports on the Great Lakes and St. Lawrence Seaway.

In October 1942, German U-boat U-69 torpedoed and sank the unlit Newfoundland ferry SS Caribou, killing 137 people. Then on 25 November 1944 HMCS Shawinigan was torpedoed and sunk with all hands on board (91 crew) by German submarine U-1228.

In 1998, the Cypriot bulk carrier the MV Flare split in half in the Cabot Strait while sailing from Rotterdam to Quebec with the loss of 21 lives on board.

=== Communications ===
The strait is crossed daily by the Marine Atlantic ferry service linking Channel-Port aux Basques and North Sydney. Ferries have been operating across the strait since 1898, and a submarine telegraph cable was laid in 1856 as part of the transatlantic telegraph cable project.

The Trans Canada Microwave system was extended to Newfoundland in 1959. To get it to Newfoundland, it was fed from Sydney, Nova Scotia to a repeater in Cape North that was 427 metres above sea-level. That allowed it cross the 127 kilometres across the Cabot Strait to a repeater station perched 198 metres above sea-level in Red Rocks, Newfoundland and Labrador. From there, the signal was microwaved over land to St. John's.
