= Beothuk language =

Extinct language of Newfoundland

Beothuk
- Beothukan
- Native to: Canada
- Region: Newfoundland
- Ethnicity: Beothuk
- Extinct: June 6, 1829, with the death of Shanawdithit
- Language family: Language isolate (Algonquian?)

Language codes
- ISO 639-3: bue
- Glottolog: beot1247
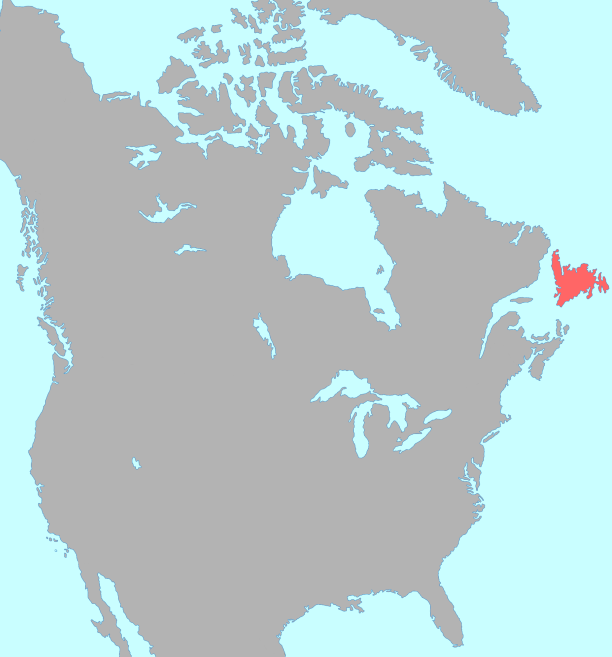
- Pre-contact distribution of Beothuk language

Beothuk (/biːˈɒtək/ or /ˈbeɪ.əθʊk/), also called Beothukan, is an extinct language isolate once spoken by the indigenous Beothuk people of Newfoundland. The Beothuk have been extinct since 1829, and there are few written accounts of their language. Hence, little is known about it, with practically no structural data existing for Beothuk.

== Classification ==
Claims of links with the neighbouring Algonquian language family date back at least to Robert Gordon Latham in 1862. From 1968 onwards, John Hewson has put forth evidence of sound correspondences and shared morphology with Proto-Algonquian and other better-documented Algonquian languages. If this is valid, Beothuk would be an extremely divergent member of the family.

Other researchers claimed that proposed similarities are more likely the result of borrowing than cognates. The limited and poor nature of the documentation means there is not enough evidence to draw strong conclusions. Owing to this overall lack of meaningful evidence, Ives Goddard and Lyle Campbell claim that any connections between Beothuk and Algonquian are unknown and likely unknowable.

=== Comparison with Proto-Algonquian ===
Below is a comparison of Beothuk words from Hewson (1978) with Proto-Algonquian lexical reconstructions from Hewson (2017).

| gloss | Proto-Algonquian | Beothuk |
|---|---|---|
| head | *wiᐧši (his) | keawthaw; geothuk; keauthut, gonothun |
| hair | *wiᐧΘeʔsi | donna; drummet; drone-oock; dronna |
| eye | *neškiᐧnšekwi (my) | geegnyan; gwinya |
| ear | *nehtaᐧwakaᐧyi (my) | mismuth; mootchiman; mooshaman |
| nose | *nexkiwani (my) | g(h)een |
| tooth | *niᐧpiči (my) | outhermay |
| tongue | *wiᐧΘani (his) | memaza; mamadthuk (cf. mouth); memasuck |
| mouth | *wetoᐧni (his) | mamudthun; mameshook |
| hand | *neΘenčyi (my) | memen (hands or fingers); maelmed; memet |
| foot | *nesiči (my) | hodwitch; adyouth (cf. leg) |
| breast | *wetoᐧhšali | bemoot; bogomot |
| meat | *wiᐧyawehsi | ashauch |
| blood | *meçkwi | ashaboouth; arrowbauth; izzobauth, iggobauth |
| bone | *weΘkani | aenameen |
| person | *elenyiwa; *naᐧpeᐧwa; *niᐧmaΘawa | shawdtharut |
| dog | *aΘemwa | mammasamit; mammasameet |
| fish | *nameᐧwa, *nameᐧʔsa; *mesaya | poopusrout; baubooshrat |
| louse | *ehkwa | cusebee; kusebeet |
| tree | *-aᐧhtekw | annooee |
| leaf | *aniᐧpyi | madyua; madyna |
| water | *nepyi | ebauthoo; ebadoe |
| fire | *eškweteᐧwi | koorae; oodrat; boobeeshawt (cf. lightning); woodrat |
| stone | *aʔsenya | ou(ge)n; ahune 'rocks' |

== Recorded song ==
In 1910, American anthropologist Frank Speck recorded a 74-year-old Indigenous woman named Santu Toney singing a song purported to be in the language. The recording resurfaced at the very end of the 20th century. Some sources give the year 1929, but the 1910 date is confirmed in Speck's book Beothuk and Micmac. The words are hard to hear and not understood. Santu said she had been taught the song by her father, named Kop, whose people called themselves osa'ɣana, which may be evidence that one person with a Beothuk connection was alive after the death of Shanawdithit in 1829 since Santu Toney was born about 1835). Contemporary researchers have tried to make a transcription of the song and to clean up the recording with modern methods. Native groups have learned the song.

James P. Howley, Director of the Geological Survey of Newfoundland, who for more than forty years was interested in the history of the Beothuk, doubted, in 1914, the truthfulness of Santu Toney.

== Vocabulary ==
Beothuk is known only from several wordlists from the 18th and 19th centuries by George C. Pulling, Rev. John Clinch, Rev. John Leigh, and Hercules Robinson. They contain more than 400 words that had been collected from speakers such as Oubee, Demasduit, and Shanawdithit, but there were no examples of connected speech. Wordlists had also been collected by W. E. Cormack (who worked with Shanawdithit), Richard King (whose wordlist had been passed on to Robert Gordon Latham), and James P. Howley (who worked with Jure, a widow from the islands of the Bay of Exploits).

The lack of any systematic or consistent representation of the vocabulary in the wordlists makes it daunting to establish the sound system of Beothuk, and words that are listed separately on the lists may be the same word transcribed in different ways. Moreover, the lists are known to have many mistakes. That, along with the lack of connected speech, leaves little upon which to build any reconstruction of Beothuk.

=== Combined lists ===
The wordlists have been transcribed and analyzed in Hewson's Vocabularies, and the combined Beothuk wordlists below have been reproduced from the same work.

| Gloss | Beothuk (all lists combined) | Latham / King (1850) | Cormack (m.s.) | Clinch (m.s.) | Leigh (m.s.) | Robinson (1834) | Howley (1915) |
|---|---|---|---|---|---|---|---|
| afraid | cockaboset 'don't be afraid' | cockaboset 'don't be afraid' | | | | | |
| alive | mamisut; mamseet | mamseet | mamisut | | | | |
| angry | assoyt | | assoyt | | | | |
| ankle | geijebursut | | geijebursut | | | | |
| arm | watheek; shedbasing wathik 'upper arm'; watheekee; memayet 'arms' | watheekee | watheek; shedbasing wathik 'upper arm' | | memayet 'arms' | | |
| arrow | ashooging; dogemat | ashooging | ashooging | | dogemat | | |
| asleep, dead | widdun | | | | | | widdun |
| awake | amet | | amet | | | | |
| baby | messiligethook | messiligethook | | | | | |
| back | posson; possont | | | posson | possont | | |
| bad | mudty; mudeet 'bad man'; maudee, muddy, madich | maudee, muddy, madich | mudty; mudeet 'bad man' | | | | |
| bakeapples | abidemashick | | | | | abidemashick | |
| bat | sosheet | sosheet | | | | | |
| bead | baasick (cf. necklace) | | baasick (cf. necklace) | | | | |
| bear | washawet; gwashuwet | washawet | | | gwashuwet | | |
| beast | obditch (cf. cat, seal) | | | obditch (cf. cat, seal) | | | |
| beat | pugathuse beating; bukashowite | | | pugathuse beating | bukashowite | | |
| beaver | maumshet; mamshet | maumshet | | | mamshet | | |
| (go to) bed | boochauwhit (cf. sleep, lie down) | boochauwhit (cf. sleep, lie down) | | | | | |
| belly | haddabatheek (cf. body) | | haddabatheek (cf. body) | | | | |
| berries | manus; bibidigemidic | manus | | | bibidigemidic | | |
| birch | paushee 'birch rind or paper'; by-yeech 'birch tree'; boyish 'birch rind' | by-yeech 'birch tree' | | paushee 'birch rind or paper' | boyish 'birch rind' | | |
| bird | deynyad, deynyadrook 'birds' | | deynyad, deynyadrook 'birds' | | | | |
| bird (large) | popadish (cf. pigeon) | | | popadish (cf. pigeon) | | | |
| bird (little) | obseet; ounermish | | obseet | ounermish | | | |
| birds' excrement | sugamith | | | sugamith | | | |
| bite | bashoodite | | | | bashoodite | | |
| black | maudzyke; mandzey | mandzey | maudzyke | | | | |
| blackbird | woodch | | woodch | | | | |
| blankets | manaboret; manavorit | manaboret | | | manavorit | | |
| blind | kaesing-guinyeet | | kaesing-guinyeet | | | | |
| blood | ashaboouth; arrowbauth; izzobauth or iggobauth | | ashaboouth | arrowbauth | izzobauth or iggobauth | | |
| blow | deschudodoick | | deschudodoick | | | | |
| blow the nose | shegame; shegamit | | | shegame | shegamit | | |
| blue | eeshang-eyghth | | eeshang-eyghth | | | | |
| blunt | boas seek; mocothutt blunt-nosed fish | | boas seek; mocothutt blunt-nosed fish | | | | |
| boat | adolthtek (cf. canoe, ship); adothe 'boat or vessel' | adolthtek (cf. canoe, ship) | | | adothe 'boat or vessel' | | |
| boat (large) | dhoorado | dhoorado | | | | | |
| body | haddabothy; haddabothic | | | haddabothy | haddabothic | | |
| boil (as water) | oadjameet | | oadjameet | | | | |
| boil (transitive) | moadamutt | | moadamutt | | | | |
| bone | aenameen | | aenameen | | | | |
| bonnet, hat | abodoneek; abadungeyk; abodonec | abadungeyk | abodoneek | | abodonec | | |
| bosom | bodchmoot; boghmoot (cf. breast) | boghmoot (cf. breast) | bodchmoot | | | | |
| bow | hathemay; anyemen | anyemen | | hathemay | | | |
| boy (white) | bukashamesh; buggishamish; buggishamesh | buggishamesh | bukashamesh | | bukashamesh | | buggishamish |
| boy (Indian) | mossessdeesh; mogazeesh | mogazeesh | mossessdeesh | | | | |
| bread | maujebathook; annawhadya | annawhadya | maujebathook | | | | |
| break a stick | pugenon | | | pugenon | | | |
| break wind | tediddle | | | tediddle | | | |
| breast | bemoot (cf. bosom); bogomot | | bemoot (cf. bosom) | | bogomot | | |
| breath | gaboweete | | gaboweete | | | | |
| bushes | maudeweech | maudeweech | | | | | |
| buttons | aegumet; agamet 'buttons or money' | aegumet | | | agamet 'buttons or money' | | |
| candle | shapoth; shaboth | shapoth | | | shaboth | | |
| canoe | thubathew 'boat or canoe'; dapathook; tapathook | dapathook | | thubathew boat or canoe | tapathook | | |
| cap | eeseeboon (cf. bonnet) | eeseeboon (cf. bonnet) | | | | | |
| capelin | shamook; shaamoo; shamooth | shamook; shaamoo | | | shamooth | | |
| cat | obodish; abidesoot; abideeshook | abidesoot | | | abideeshook | | obodish |
| cat (marten) | abidish | abidish | | | abidish | | |
| catching fish | eshbauth | | | eshbauth | | | |
| cattle | methabeet; nethabete | methabeet | | | nethabete | | |
| cheek | weenoun | weenoun | | | | | |
| chin | keoun; geoun; goun | geoun | | keoun | goun | | |
| clothes | dhingyam; thingyam | dhingyam | | | thingyam | | |
| clouds | berroick | | | | berroick | | |
| coal | methie 'coal, dirt' | | | methie | | methie 'dirt' | |
| cockle | sheedeneesheet | sheedeneesheet | | | | | |
| codfish | bobboosoret (cf. fish) | bobboosoret (cf. fish) | | | bobboosoret (cf. fish) | | |
| cold | eenodsha; moidewsee | eenodsha | | | moidewsee | | |
| comb | edrathin | | | | edrathin | | |
| come | touet; deiood | touet; deiood | | | | | |
| come back again | nadyed | nadyed | | | | | |
| come hither | dyoot thouret; dyoom; thooret | dyoom | dyoot thouret | | thooret | | |
| comet | anin | | | | anin | | |
| cream jug | nadalahet; motheryet | nadalahet | | | motheryet | | |
| cry | mautheauthaw; matheothuc | | | mautheauthaw | matheothuc | | |
| currants | shamye | | | shamye | shamye | | |
| cut | hadyusum; odishuik or odishuite | | | hadyusum | odishuik or odishuite | | |
| dancing | thubwedgie; badiseet | | | thubwedgie | badiseet | | |
| dead | gosset; gausep (cf. asleep) | gosset; gausep (cf. asleep) | | | | | |
| deer | osweet; cosweet | cosweet | | | osweet | | osweet |
| deer's horns | megorum; megorun | megorum | | | megorun | | |
| devil | ashmudyim; haoot | haoot | ashmudyim | | | | |
| dirt | yew-why | | | yew-why | | | |
| dog | mammasamit; mammasameet | mammasameet | | | mammasameet | | mammasamit |
| dogberries | menome | | | menome | | | |
| dogwood, mountain ash | emoethook | emoethook | | | emoethook | | |
| drawing knife | moheshaudet; moeshwadet | moheshaudet | | | moeshwadet | | |
| drink | ebathook; ebathoot (cf. water) | ebathook; ebathoot (cf. water) | | | | | |
| drinking cup | shoewan; shoewanyeesh (dim.) | | shoewan; shoewanyeesh (dim.) | | | | |
| dry | gasook | gasook | | | | | |
| duck | eesheet; boodowit | eesheet | | | boodowit | | |
| ducks and drakes | mameshet; howmeshet | | | | mameshet | howmeshet | |
| eagle | gobidin | | gobidin | | | | |
| ear | mismuth; mootchiman; mooshaman | mootchiman | | mismuth | mooshaman | | |
| eat | pugazoa; bocootyone; pokoodsoont; odoit | bocootyone; pokoodsoont | | pugazoa | odoit | | |
| egg | deboin; debine | deboin | | | debine | | |
| elbow | moocus | | | moocus | moocus | | |
| Eskimo | ashwan | ashwan | | | | | |
| eye | geegnyan; gwinya | geegnyan | | | gwinya | | |
| eyebrow | momeaugh; marmeuck | | | momeaugh | marmeuck | | |
| fall | koshet | | | | koshet | | |
| fat | eeg | eeg | | | | | |
| fear | geswat; cockaboset 'no fear' | geswat; cockaboset 'no fear' | | | | | |
| feather | evenau; ewinon; abobidress 'feathers' | ewinon | | evenau | abobidress 'feathers' | | |
| finger | onnus 'forefinger'; oddesamick 'little finger'; awadshibik 'middle finger'; wyabick 'ring finger'; hanyees | hanyees | | | | | onnus 'forefinger'; oddesamick 'little finger'; awadshibik 'middle finger'; wyabick 'ring finger' |
| fire | koorae; oodrat; boobeeshawt (cf. lightning); woodrat | oodrat; boobeeshawt (cf. lightning) | | koorae | woodrat | | |
| fish | poopusrout; baubooshrat (cf. codfish) | baubooshrat (cf. codfish) | | poopusrout | | | |
| fish hook | adooch; adothook | adooch | | | adothook | | |
| fishing line | disup; edat | | | disup | edat | | |
| flea | kessyet | | | kessyet | | | |
| flesh (meat) | ashauch | ashauch | | | | | |
| flying | miawoth; miaoth | | | miawoth | miaoth | | |
| foot | hodwitch; adyouth (cf. leg) | adyouth (cf. leg) | | hodwitch | | | |
| forehead | doothun | doothun | | | | | |
| fork | papade-aden; etheuwit | | | papade-aden | etheuwit | | |
| fowl | edgedoweshin | | | | | | edgedoweshin |
| fox | dogajavick | dogajavick | | | | | |
| fur, animal hair | peatha | | | peatha | peatha | | |
| gaping | abemite | | | | abemite | | |
| get up | amshut; kinup; ganyess | | amshut | | ganyess | | kinup |
| gimlet | quadranuck | quadranuck | | | quadranuck | | |
| girl (white) | imamuset; emamooset | emamooset | | | emamooset | | imamuset |
| girl (Indian) | woaseesh | woaseesh | | | | | |
| give me | dayhamin | dayhamin | | | | | |
| (we) give thee a knife | wawashemet o-owin | wawashemet o-owin | | | | | |
| glass | hadalahet (cf. cream jug); hadibiet | hadalahet (cf. cream jug) | | | hadibiet | | |
| gloves | obsedeek | obsedeek | | | obsedeek | | |
| go away | gayzhoot | gayzhoot | | | | | |
| go home | baetha | baetha | | | | | |
| go out | baeodut; enano | baeodut | | | enano | | |
| good | homedick; oomdzech; betheote 'good night' | homedick; oomdzech | | | betheote 'good night' | | |
| goose | yewone; odo-ezheet (cf. duck); odeusook | odo-ezheet (cf. duck) | | yewone | odeusook | | |
| gooseberry | jiggamint | | | | jiggamint | | |
| grass | shisth | | | shisth | | | |
| grindstone | shewthake; aquathoont | shewthake | | | aquathoont | | |
| groaning | cheeashit; cheashit | | | cheeashit | cheashit | | |
| gull | asson | asson | | | asson | | |
| gun | harreen or huz-seen; adamadret | adamadret | | harreen or huz-seen | adamadret | | |
| gun powder | beasothunt | beasothunt | | | beasothunt | | |
| hair | donna; drummet; drone-oock; dronna | drone-oock | | donna | dronna | | drummet |
| halibut, flatfish | hanawasutt | hanawasutt | | | | | |
| hammer | iwish; mattuis | iwish | | | mattuis | | |
| hand | memen 'hands or fingers'; maelmed; memet | maelmed | | memen 'hands or fingers' | memet | | |
| hare | odusweet | odusweet | | | odusweet | | |
| (make) haste | ishu; eeshoo | eeshoo | | | | | ishu |
| hatchet | nowaut; thinyun; dthoonanyen; thingaya | thinyun; dthoonanyen | | nowaut | | thingaya | |
| head | keawthaw; geothuk; keauthut, gonothun | geothuk | | keawthaw | keauthut, gonothun | | |
| hear | noduera | noduera | | | | | |
| heart | bedoret; bogodoret | bedoret | | | bogodoret | | |
| heaven | theehone | theehone | | | | | |
| herring | washemesh | | | | washemesh | | |
| hiccups | mudyraw; madyrut | | | mudyraw | madyrut | | |
| hill | kaasook; keoosock | kaasook; keoosock | | | | | |
| hoop | woin | | | | woin | | |
| house | mae-adthike (cf. hut); mammateek | mae-adthike (cf. hut) | | | mammateek | | |
| hungry | dauoosett | dauoosett | | | | | |
| (not) hurt | aoodrach | aoodrach | | | | | |
| husband | zathrook (cf. man) | | | | zathrook (cf. man) | | |
| hut | meothik (cf. house) | meothik (cf. house) | | | | | |
| ice | ozrook; ozeru | ozrook | | | ozeru | | |
| Indian (red) | behathook; beothuck; beathook | behathook; beothuck | | | beathook | | |
| Indian cup | shucodidimet; shucodidimit | shucodidimet | | | shucodidimit | | |
| iron | mauageene; maudshinuk; mowageenite | | | mauageene | mowageenite | | maudshinuk |
| islands | mammasheek | | | | mammasheek | | |
| kill | whadicheme; bogathoowytch | whadicheme; bogathoowytch | | | | | |
| (not) kill | datyuns | datyuns | | | | | |
| kiss | sheboth; widumite | | | sheboth | widumite | | |
| knee | hodsmishit; hodamishit | | | hodsmishit | hodamishit | | |
| kneeling | abusthibe; abusthibit | | | abusthibe | abusthibit | | |
| knife | yewoin; iwo-in; aewaeen; hewhine; uine | aewaeen; hewhine | | yewoin | uine | | iwo-in |
| lamp | mondicuet; bobdiduishemet | mondicuet | | | bobdiduishemet | | |
| laugh | whoishme; wyeeth | | | whoishme | wyeeth | | |
| lead | goosheben | | | | goosheben | | |
| lean, thin, sick | ashei | ashei | | | | | |
| leaves | madyua; madyna | | | madyua | madyna | | |
| leg | cogadealla; aduse (cf. foot) | | | cogadealla | aduse (cf. foot) | | |
| lie | pisauwau; bituwait (cf. sleep) | | | pisauwau | bituwait (cf. sleep) | | |
| life | mamset (cf. alive) | mamset (cf. alive) | | | | | |
| lightning | koorae; barodiisick (cf. fire and thunder) | | | koorae | barodiisick (cf. fire and thunder) | | |
| (I) like | adjeedisk | adjeedisk | | | | | |
| lip | coosh; ooish | | | coosh | ooish | | |
| lobster | odjet | odjet | | | odjet | | |
| long | kannabuck | kannabuck | | | | | |
| lord bird, harlequin duck | mammadrouit | | | | mammadrouit | | |
| louse | cusebee; kusebeet | | | cusebee | kusebeet | | |
| lumpfish | aeshemeet | | aeshemeet | | | | |
| mainland | gauzewook | | | | gauzewook | | |
| man (white) | pushaman; buggishaman; bukashaman | buggishaman | | pushaman | bukashaman | | buggishaman |
| man (Indian) | shawdtharut (cf. husband) | shawdtharut (cf. husband) | | | | | |
| Micmac | shanung | shanung | | | | | |
| milk | madabooch | madabooch | | | | | |
| moccasin | moosin; mosen | moosin; mosen | | | | | |
| money | beodet | beodet | | | | | |
| moon | kuus; keeose, washageuis; kius, washewiush | keeose, washageuis | kuus | | kius, washewiush | | |
| mosquito | shema bogosthuc | | | | shema bogosthuc | | |
| mouth | mamudthun; mameshook | mamudthun | | | mameshook | | |
| muscle (mussel) | owameet | owameet | | | | | |
| nails | cush; quish | | | cush | quish | | |
| neck | tedesheet (cf. throat) | | | tedesheet (cf. throat) | tedesheet (cf. throat) | | |
| necklace | zeek (cf. beads); bethec | zeek (cf. beads) | | | bethec | | |
| needle | tuzmus; dosomite (cf. pin) | | | tuzmus | dosomite (cf. pin) | | |
| net | giggaremanet | giggaremanet | | | giggaremanet | | |
| night | washewch; washew | washewch | | | washew | | |
| nipper | bebadrook | | | | bebadrook | | |
| no | newin | newin | | | | | |
| nose | gheen; geen | gheen | | | geen | | |
| oakum | mushabauth | | | mushabauth | mushabauth | | |
| oar | poodybeac | | | poodybeac | poodybeac | | |
| ochre | odemen; odement | odemen | | | odement | | |
| oil | emet | emet | | | emet | | |
| otter | edachoom; edru | edachoom | | | edru | | |
| partridge | susut; zosoot; zosweet | zosoot | | susut | zosweet | | |
| partridgeberries | shaudame | | | shaudame | | | |
| pigeon (sea), (guillemot) | bobbodish (cf. bird) | bobbodish (cf. bird) | | | bobbodish (cf. bird) | | bobbodish (cf. bird) |
| pin | tusmug; dosomite | dosomite | | tusmug | dosomite | | |
| pitcher, cup, plate | manume; manune | manume | | | manune | | |
| pond | woodum | woodum | | | | | |
| puffin | gwoshuawit | | | | gwoshuawit | | |
| puppies | mammasameet (cf. dog) | | | | mammasameet (cf. dog) | | |
| rain | pedthae; watshoosooch; badoese; bathuc | watshoosooch; badoese | | pedthae | bathuc | | |
| raspberries | gauzadun | | | | | gauzadun | |
| rat | gadgemish | | | | gadgemish | | |
| red | deedrashow | deedrashow | | | | | |
| river | shebon; shebin brook | shebon; shebin brook | | | | | |
| rocks | ahune | | | | ahune | | |
| rolling | odausot | | | odausot | | | |
| rowing | huzzagan; osavate | | | huzzagan | osavate | | |
| run | wothamashee; ibadinnam; wothamashet | ibadinnam | | wothamashee | wothamashet | | |
| sails | ejabathook | ejabathook | | | ejabathook | | |
| salmon | wasemook | wasemook | | | wasemook | | |
| saw | dedoweet; deddoweet | dedoweet | | | deddoweet | | |
| salt water | massoock | massoock | | | | | |
| scab | pigathee | | | pigathee | pigathee | | |
| scallop | gowet | | | | gowet | | |
| scalping the head | nomushrush keawthaw | | | nomushrush keawthaw | | | |
| scissors | oseenyet; osegeeu | oseenyet | | | osegeeu | | |
| scratch | bashubet | | | | bashubet | | |
| seal | momau; bidesuk; beedzuk; bidesook | bidesuk; beedzuk | | momau | bidesook | | |
| seal sunk | aparet a bidesook | | | | aparet a bidesook | | |
| seal skin bag | bochmoot 'seal skin sledge full' | | bochmoot 'seal skin sledge full' | | | | |
| see | ejew | ejew | | | | | |
| shake hands | meman momasthus; kawinjemeesh; meman monasthus | kawinjemeesh | | meman momasthus | meman monasthus | | |
| ship, vessel | mamzhing; mamashee (cf. boat) | mamashee (cf. boat) | mamzhing | | | | |
| shoes | moosin (cf. mocassin) | | | | moosin (cf. mocassin) | | |
| shoot | hodthoo 'shoot a gun'; outhaje-arrathunum 'shoot an arrow perpendicularly'; wadshoodet | wadshoodet | | hodthoo 'shoot a gun'; outhaje-arrathunum 'shoot an arrow perpendicularly' | | | |
| short | yeech | yeech | | | | | |
| shoulder | momezabethon; momegemethon | | | momezabethon | momegemethon | | |
| shovel | hadowadet; godawick | hadowadet | | | godawick | | |
| silk handkerchief | egibiduish | egibiduish | | | egibiduish | | |
| sinew of deer | modthamook | modthamook | | | | | |
| singing | tuauthaw; awoodet | | | tuauthaw | awoodet | | |
| sit | haddosdoding; athep | athep | | haddosdoding | athep | | |
| sleep | puthuauth; bootzhawet; aoseedwit 'I am sleepy' (cf. lie, bed); isedoweet | bootzhawet; aoseedwit 'I am sleepy' (cf. lie, bed) | | puthuauth | isedoweet | | |
| sleeve | wobesheet | wobesheet | | | | | |
| smell | marot | marot | | | | | |
| smoke | possthee; basdiek; besdic | basdiek | | possthee | besdic | | |
| snail | aeueece | aeueece | | | | | |
| sneezing | midyathew; adjith | | | midyathew | adjith | | |
| snipe | auojet | | | | auojet | | |
| snow | (corrasoob); causabow; kaasussabook | causabow; kaasussabook | | (corrasoob) | | | |
| song | mamatrabet (a long?) | mamatrabet (a long?) | | | | | |
| soon | jewmetcheen | jewmetcheen | | | | | |
| sore throat | anadrick | anadrick | | | anadrick | | |
| sorrow | corrasoob (cf. snow) | | | corrasoob (cf. snow) | corrasoob (cf. snow) | | |
| speak | carmtack; jeroothack | carmtack; jeroothack | | | | | |
| spear | anun; aaduth 'seal spear'; amina 'deer spear'; hannan | | anun; aaduth 'seal spear'; amina 'deer spear' | hannan | | | |
| spider | woadthoowin | woadthoowin | | | | | |
| spoon | hanamait; adadiminte, andemin | adadiminte, andemin | | hanamait | | | |
| spouse | anwoyding | anwoyding | | | | | |
| spruce | trawnasoo | | | trawnasoo | trawnasoo | | |
| spruce rind | sousot | | | sousot | | | |
| standing | kingabie; kingiabit | | | kingabie | kingiabit | | |
| stars | so-ushzeth; shawwayet; adenishit | shawwayet | | so-ushzeth | adenishit | | |
| stinking seal | mattik bidesook | mattik bidesook | | | mattik bidesook | | |
| stockings | gassek; gasset | gassek | | | gasset | | |
| stones | ougen; oun (cf. rocks) | oun (cf. rocks) | | ougen | | | |
| stooping | hedy-yan | | | hedy-yan | hedy-yan | | |
| sugar | shedothoon | shedothoon | | | | | |
| sun, moon | dewis; keeose; keuse; magaragueis 'sun'; washageuis 'moon'; kius; maugerooius 'sun'; washewiush 'moon' | keeose; keuse; magaragueis 'sun'; washageuis 'moon' | | dewis | kius; maugerooius 'sun'; washewiush 'moon' | | |
| swimming | tuwedgie; thoowidgee (cf. dancing) | | | tuwedgie | thoowidgee (cf. dancing) | | |
| sword | bidisoni | bidisoni | | | bidisoni | | |
| tea | butterweye (probably garbled) | butterweye (probably garbled) | | | | | |
| teeth | outhermay; botomet outhermayet | | | outhermay | botomet outhermayet | | |
| thank you | thine | | | | thine | | |
| thigh | ipeween; ipweena | | | ipeween | ipweena | | |
| thread | meroopish; meroobish (cf. twine) | | | meroopish | meroobish (cf. twine) | | |
| throat | tedesheet (cf. neck) | | | tedesheet (cf. neck) | | | |
| throw a trap | shaubabuneshaw | | | shaubabuneshaw | | | |
| throw | pugatho; pugathoite | | | pugatho | pugathoite | | |
| thumb | pooith; buit; boad; pooeth | boad | | pooith | pooeth | | buit |
| thunder | petothorish; barodiisick (cf. lightning) | | | petothorish | barodiisick (cf. lightning) | | |
| ticklace (kittiwake) | gotheyet | gotheyet | | | gotheyet | | |
| tickle (gut, sound, strait) | kaduishuite | | | | kaduishuite | | |
| tinker (razorbill) | oothook | | | | oothook | | |
| tobacco | nechwa | nechwa | | | | | |
| tomorrow | maduck | maduck | | | | | |
| tongue | memaza; mamadthuk (cf. mouth); memasuck | mamadthuk (cf. mouth) | | memaza | memasuck | | |
| trap | tibethun; lathun; shebathoont | lathun | | tibethun | shebathoont | | |
| tree, woods | annooee | annooee | | | | | |
| trousers | mowead | mowead | | | mowead | | |
| trout | dottomeish | dottomeish | | | dottomeish | | |
| turr (murre) | geonet | geonet | | | geonet | | |
| twine | meroopish; madobeesh | madobeesh | | meroopish | | | |
| walk | woothyan; baysot (cf. run); woothyat | | | woothyan | woothyat | | baysot (cf. run) |
| walking stick | cheething | | | cheething | | | |
| warm | obosheen 'warming yourself'; boobasha | boobasha | | obosheen 'warming yourself' | obosheen 'warming yourself' | | |
| watch | dewis; keeose (cf. sun, moon); kius | dewis; keeose (cf. sun, moon) | | | kius | | |
| water | ebauthoo; ebadoe; zebathoong 'water (drink)' | ebadoe; zebathoong 'water (drink)' | | ebauthoo | ebauthoo | | |
| water bucket | guinyabutt (with vertical or sloping sides); sunong-guinyabutt (large at bottom, small at top) | | guinyabutt (with vertical or sloping sides); sunong-guinyabutt (large at bottom, small at top) | | | | |
| wet | wabee (confusion with white) | wabee (confusion with white) | | | | | |
| whale's tail | owasposhno-un | | owasposhno-un | | | | |
| where do you go | becket | becket | | | | | |
| white | wobee | wobee | | | | | |
| whortle berries | mamoose (cf. berries) | | | | | mamoose (cf. berries) | |
| wife | oosuck | | | | oosuck | | |
| wife (white) | adizabad-zea | adizabad-zea | | | | | |
| wind | tisewthun; gidgeathuc | | | tisewthun | gidgeathuc | | |
| wood | adiab | | | adiab | adiab | | |
| woodpecker | sheebuint; shebohoweet | shebohoweet | sheebuint | | shebohoweet | | |
| wolf | moisamadrook | | | | moisamadrook | | |
| woman | imamus; emamoose; woass-sut 'red Indian woman' | emamoose; woass-sut 'red Indian woman' | | | emamoose | | imamus |
| yawning | tibeath; jibeath | | | tibeath | jibeath | | |
| yes | ethath; yeathun | ethath; yeathun | | | | | |

=== Numerals ===
Numerals in Beothuk:

| Gloss | Cormack | Latham / King (1850) | Leigh |
|---|---|---|---|
| one | yaseek | yazeek | gathet |
| two | adzeich | adzeech | adasic |
| three | shendeek | shendee | shedsic |
| four | dabseek | dabzeek | abodoesic |
| five | ninezeek | nunyetheek | nijeek |
| six | bashedtheek | beshed | bigadosick |
| seven | oodzook | odeozook | oodosook |
| eight | aadazook | adosook | aodoosook |
| nine | yeothoduk | yeothoduck | yeothoduck |
| ten | shansee | shansee | theant |
| eleven | ee-zaziech | | |
| twelve | ee-adzide | | |
| thirteen | ee-shendeek | | |
| fourteen | ee-dabzook | | |
| fifteen | ee-ninezeek | | |
| sixteen | ee-beshedtheek | | |
| seventeen | ee-oodzook | | |
| eighteen | ee-aadazook | | |
| nineteen | ee-yeothoduck | | |
| twenty | adzeich dthoonut | | |
| thirty | shendeek dthoonut | | |

=== Months ===
Months in Beothuk:

| Gloss | Cormack list (from Shanawdithit) |
|---|---|
| January | cobshuneesamut |
| February | kosthobonong bewajoite |
| March | manamiss |
| April | wasumaweeseek |
| May | bedejamish bewajowite |
| June | wasumaweeseek |
| July | cowazaseek |
| August | wadawhegh |
| September | wasumaweeseek |
| October | godabonyegh |
| November | godabonyeesh |
| December | odasweeteeshamut |

=== Santu Toney's words ===
The following words were recalled by Santu Toney as being from her father's language:

| Gloss | Word |
|---|---|
| woman | beʼnɑ̦̀m |
| fat person | guʼwa |
| rain | gau |
| baby cradle, cradleboard | hɑ̦̀ᵍ |
| baby blanket | tuˑᵇ |
| prayer | seʼko |
| whale | siˑkaneʼˑsu |

== Legacy ==
The prehistoric cnidarian animal Haootia takes its name from the Beothuk word haoot 'demon'.
