= Kingshill =

Kingshill, King's Hill or Kings Hill may refer to:

- Kingshill, U.S. Virgin Islands, a town on Saint Croix
- Cirencester Kingshill School, Gloucestershire, England
- King's Hill, Hampshire, a hill in England
- King's Hill, West Midlands, a suburban area of Darlaston, West Midlands, England
- King's Hill Historic District, Portland, Oregon
- Kings Hill, village and parish in Kent, England
- Kings Hill Pass, Montana
