= Cirencester =

Market town in Gloucestershire, England

Coordinates: 51°43′00″N 1°58′00″W

- Market town
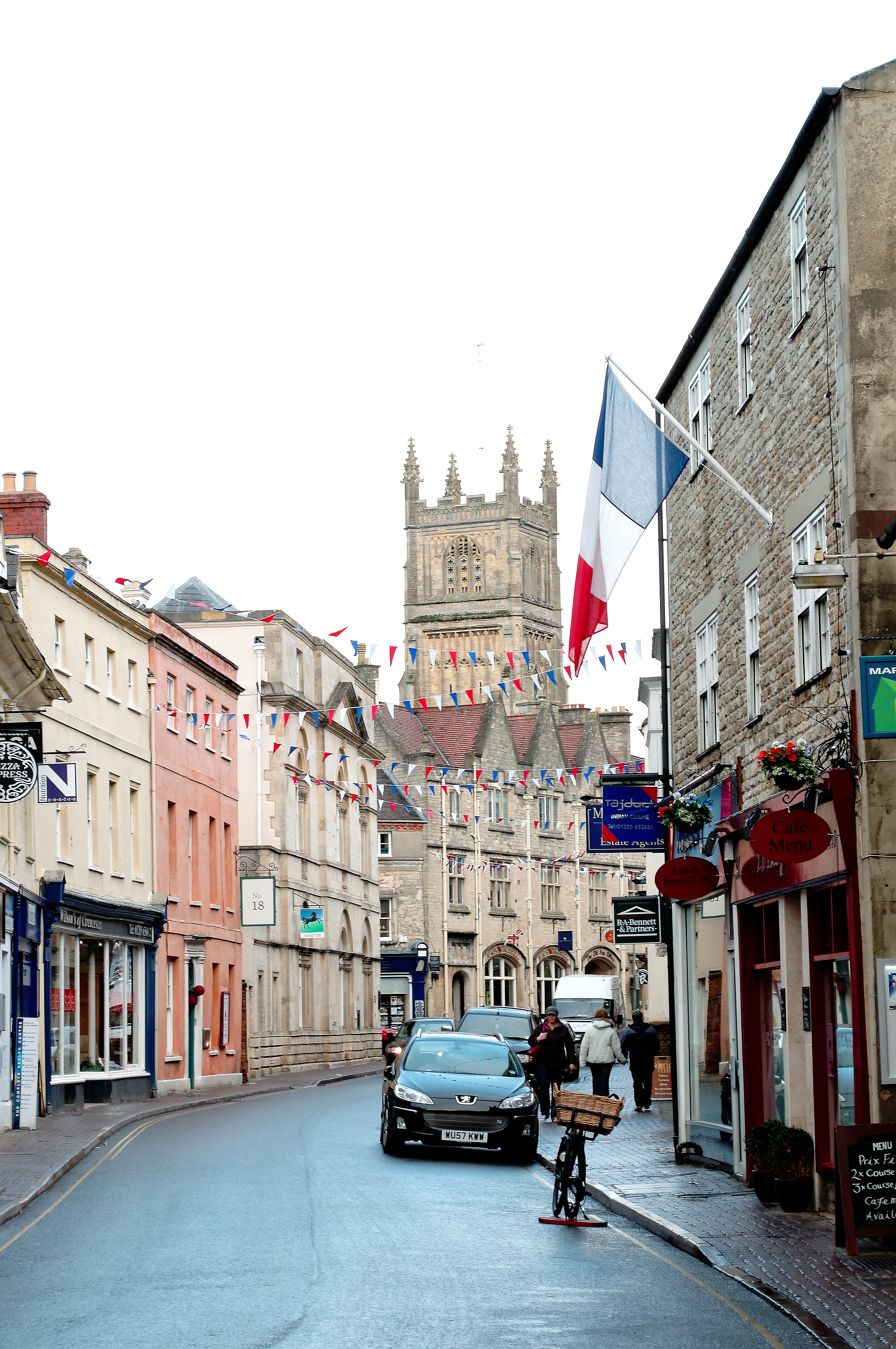

- Location within Gloucestershire
- Population: 20,229 (2021 census)
- OS grid reference: SP022021
- District: Cotswold
- Shire county: Gloucestershire
- Region: South West
- Country: England
- Sovereign state: United Kingdom
- Post town: Cirencester
- Postcode district: GL7
- Dialling code: 01285
- Police: Gloucestershire
- Fire: Gloucestershire
- Ambulance: South Western
- UK Parliament: South Cotswolds
- Website: Town council

Cirencester (/ˈsaɪ(ə)rənˌsɛstə/ SY-rən-SEST-ə, occasionally /ˈsɪsɪtə/ SIS-it-ə) is a market town and civil parish in the Cotswold District of Gloucestershire, England. It lies on the River Churn, a tributary of the Thames. Cirencester is the eighth largest settlement in Gloucestershire and the largest town within the Cotswolds. It is the home of the Royal Agricultural University, the oldest agricultural college in the English-speaking world, founded in 1840. The town had a population of 20,229 in 2021. The town is 18 miles (29 km) north-west of Swindon, 18 miles (29 km) south-east of Gloucester, 37 miles (60 km) west of Oxford and 39 miles (63 km) north-east of Bristol.

The Roman name for the town was Corinium, which is thought to have been associated with the ancient British tribe of the Dobunni, having the same root word as the River Churn. The earliest known reference to the town was by Ptolemy in AD 150. The town's Corinium Museum has an extensive Roman collection.

== Etymology ==
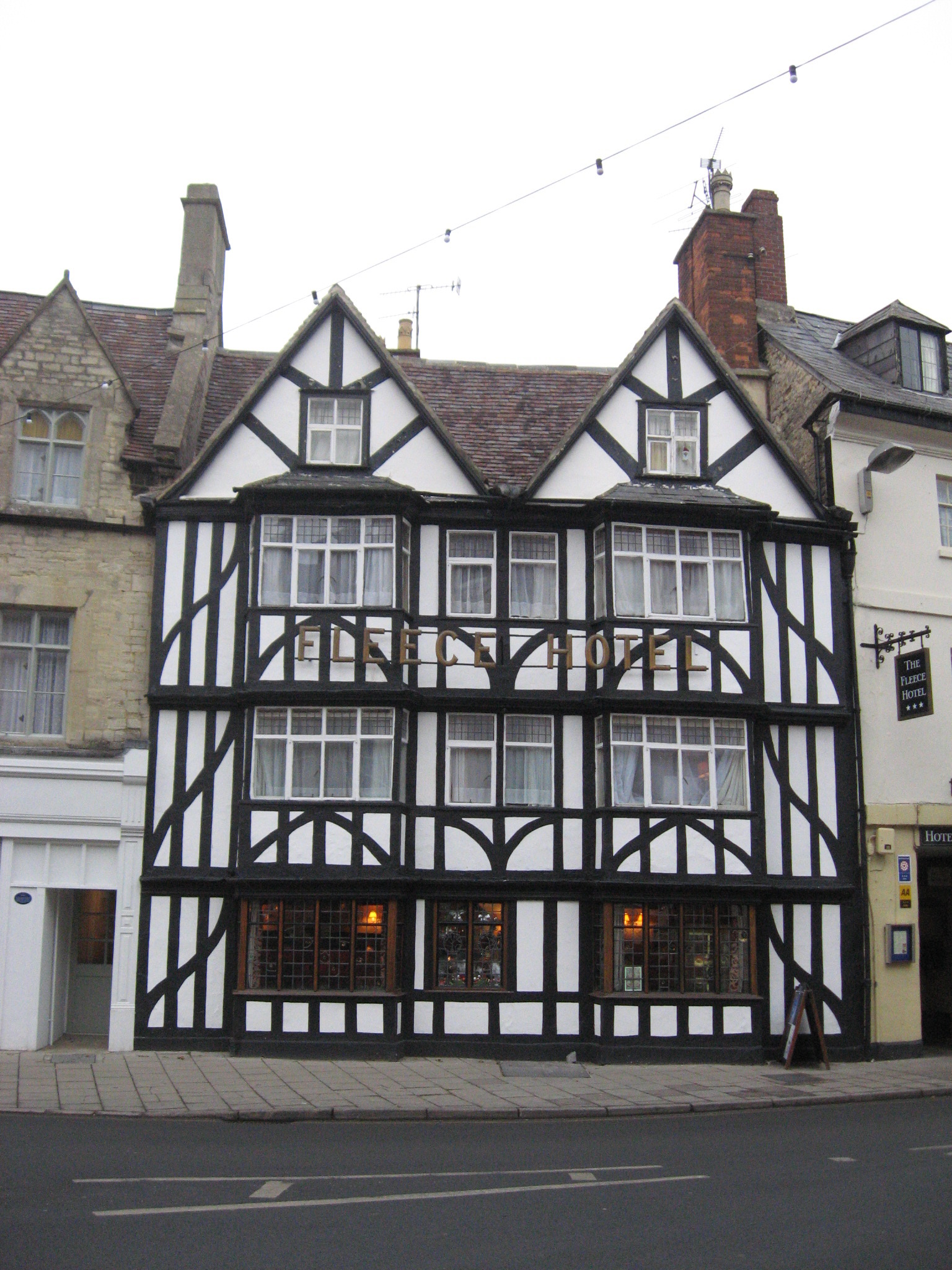
The Fleece Hotel

Cirencester's name is first attested by Ptolemy in around 150 AD, though the earliest surviving manuscripts are from the thirteenth century. These give various slightly different spellings, of which the original seems to have been Κορίνιον (Corinium). The etymology of this name is, however, unknown. The same name is found in the River Churn, which passes through the town (and which, with the addition of the Old English word ēa ('river') in turn gave its name to North Cerney, South Cerney, and Cerney Wick).

Corinum may have persisted as Caer Cori in Brittonic as stated by Asser. Later it was known in the form of Cair Ceri in writings of Nennius and Cirenceaster in the Anglo-Saxon Chronicle (a text which took its present form in the later ninth century). Other Old English forms include Cirrenceaster, Cirneceaster or Cyrneceaster (dative Cirrenceastre, Cirneceastre, Cyrneceastre), where ceaster means "fort" or "fortress". The Old English c was pronounced /tʃ/. The Normans mispronounced the /tʃ/ sound as [ts], resulting in the modern name Cirencester (/ˈsaɪrənsɛstər/). The form /ˈsɪsɪtər/, spelled Cirencester or Ciceter, was once used locally. This pronunciation is humorously highlighted in a 1928 limerick from Punch:

There was a young lady of Cirencester
Whose fiancé went down to virencester
By the Great Western line,
Which he swore was divine,
And he couldn't have been much explirencester.

These forms are now very rarely used, while many local people abbreviate the name to Ciren (/ˈsaɪrən/). Today, it is usually /ˈsaɪrənsɛstər/ (as it is spelt) or /ˈsaɪrənstər/, although occasionally it is /ˈsɪsɪstər/, /ˈsɪsɪtər/ or /ˈsɪstər/.

== History ==
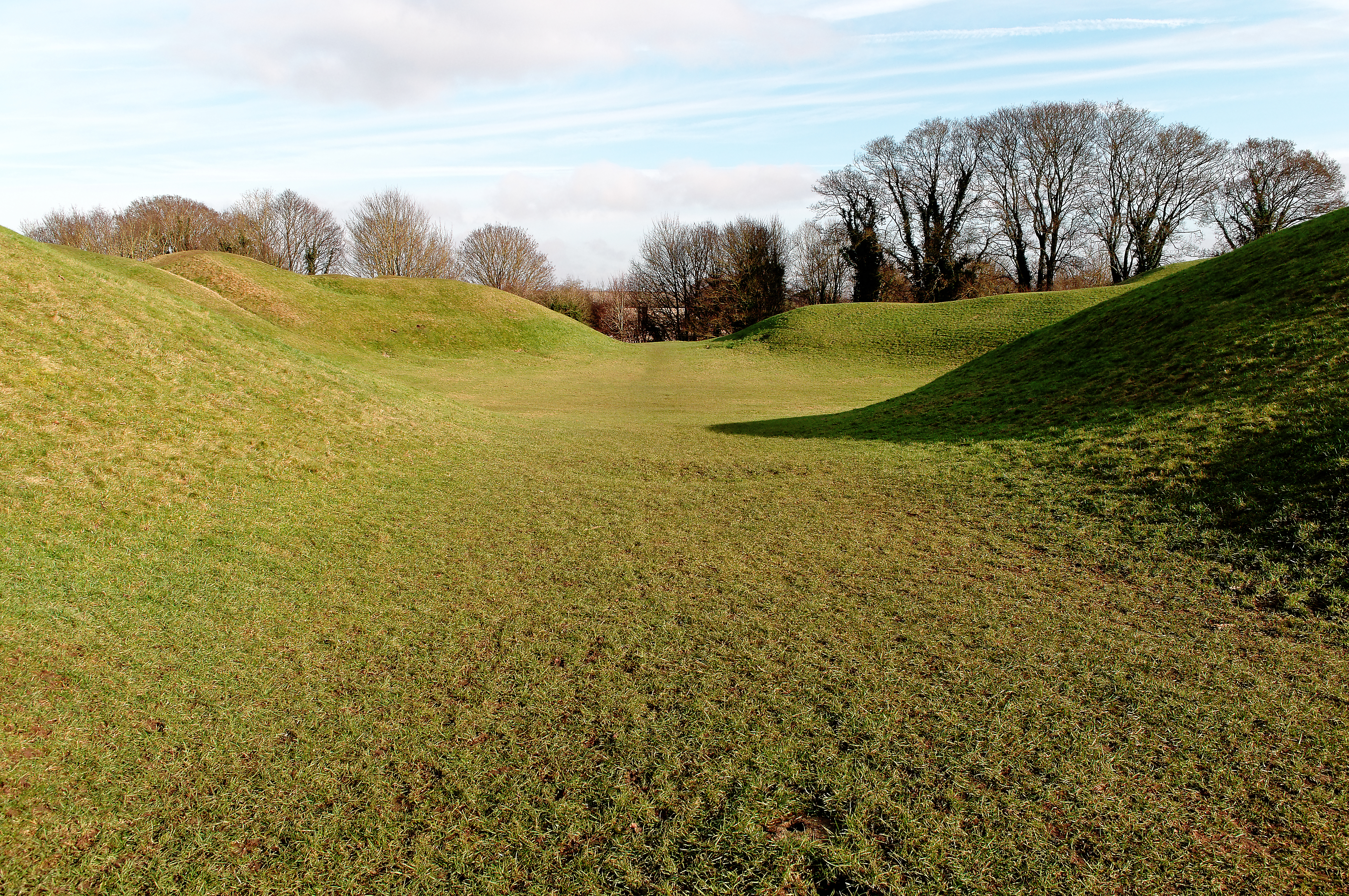
The Roman amphitheatre

=== Roman Corinium ===
Cirencester is known to have been an important early Roman area, along with St Albans and Colchester, and the town includes evidence of significant area roadworks. The Romans built a castra (fort) where the Fosse Way crossed the Churn, to hold two quingenary (i.e. 500 men) alae tasked with helping to defend the provincial frontier around AD 49, and native Dobunni were drawn from Bagendon, a settlement 3 miles (5 km) to the north, to create a civil settlement near the fort. When the frontier moved to the north after the conquest of Wales, this fort was closed and its fortifications levelled around the year 70, but the town persisted and flourished under the name Corinium.

Even in Roman times, there was a thriving wool trade and industry, which contributed to the growth of Corinium. A large forum and basilica were built over the site of the fort, and archaeological evidence shows signs of further civic growth. There are many Roman remains in the surrounding area, including several Roman villas near the villages of Chedworth and Withington. When a defensive wall was built around the Roman city in the late 2nd century, it enclosed 240 acres (1.0 km^{2}), making Corinium the second-largest city by area in Roman Britain. The details of the provinces of Britain following the Diocletian Reforms around 296 remain unclear, but Corinium is now generally thought to have been the capital of Britannia Prima. Some historians would date to this period the pillar erected by the governor Lucius Septimus to the god Jupiter, a local sign of the pagan reaction against Christianity during the principate of Julian the Apostate.

Cirencester Amphitheatre still exists in an area known as the Querns to the south-west of the town, but has only been partially excavated. Investigations in the town show that it was fortified in the 5th or 6th centuries.

=== Post-Roman and Saxon ===
Linguist Andrew Breeze claims that Gildas received his later education in Cirencester in the early 6th century, showing that it was still able to provide an education in Latin rhetoric and law at that time. Possibly this was the palace of one of the British kings defeated by Ceawlin in 577.

In the 7th century, Cirencester was the site of the Battle of Cirencester, this time between the Mercian king Penda and the West Saxon kings Cynegils and Cwichelm in 628.

The minster church of Cirencester, founded in the 9th or 10th century, was probably a royal foundation. It was made over to Augustinian canons in the 12th century and replaced by the great abbey church.

=== Norman ===
At the Norman Conquest in 1066, the royal manor of Cirencester was granted to the Earl of Hereford, William Fitz-Osbern, but by 1075 it had reverted to the Crown. The manor was granted to Cirencester Abbey, founded by Henry I in 1117, and following half a century of building work during which the minster church was demolished, the abbey church was finally dedicated in 1176. The manor was granted to the Abbey in 1189, although a royal charter dated 1133 speaks of burgesses in the town. The abbots obtained charters in 1215 and 1253 for fairs during the octaves of All Saints and St Thomas the Martyr, and the significant wool trade gave these great importance.

The struggle of the townsmen to gain the rights and privileges of a borough for Cirencester probably began with the grant of 1189, when they were amerced for a false presentment, meaning that they had presented false information. Four inquisitions during the 13th century supported the abbot's claims, yet the townspeople remained unwavering in their quest for borough status: in 1342, they lodged a Bill of complaint in Chancery. Twenty townspeople were ordered to Westminster, where they declared under oath that successive abbots had bought up many burgage tenements, and made the borough into an appendage of the manor, depriving it of its separate court. They claimed that the royal charter that conferred on the men of Cirencester the liberties of Winchester had been destroyed 50 years earlier, when the abbot had bribed the burgess who held the charter to give it to him, whereupon the abbot had had it burned. In reply, the abbot refuted these claims, and the case passed on to the King's Bench. When ordered to produce the foundation charter of his abbey the abbot refused, apparently because that document would be fatal to his case, and instead played a winning card. In return for a fine of £300, he obtained a new royal charter confirming his privileges and a writ of supersedeas.

The townspeople continued in their fight; in return for their aid to the Crown against the earls of Kent and Salisbury, Henry IV in 1403 gave the townsmen a Merchant's Guild, although two inquisitions reiterated the abbot's rights. The struggle between the abbot and the townspeople continued, with the abbot's privileges confirmed in 1408–1409 and 1413; in 1418 the abbot finally removed this thorn in his side when the guild merchant was annulled. In 1477, parliament declared that Cirencester was not corporate. After several unsuccessful attempts to re-establish the guild merchant, the government of the town was vested in the bailiff of the Lord of the manor in 1592.

=== Tudor ===
As part of the dissolution of the monasteries in 1539, Henry VIII ordered the total demolition of the Abbey buildings. Today only the Norman Arch and parts of the precinct wall remain above ground, forming the perimeter of a public park in the middle of town. Despite this, the freedom of a borough continued to elude the townspeople, and they only saw the old lord of the manor replaced by a new lord of the manor as the king acquired the abbey's title. Cirencester became a parliamentary borough in 1572, returning two members, although this was deprived of representation in 1885.

Sheep rearing, wool sales, weaving and woollen broadcloth and cloth-making were the main strengths of England's trade in the Middle Ages, and not only the abbey but many of Cirencester's merchants and clothiers gained wealth and prosperity from the national and international trade. The tombs of these merchants can be seen in the parish church, while their fine houses of Cotswold stone still stand in and around Coxwell Street and Dollar Street. Their wealth funded the rebuilding of the nave of the parish church in 1515–1530, to create the large building sometimes referred to as the "Cathedral of the Cotswolds". Other wool churches can be seen in neighbouring Northleach and Chipping Campden.

=== Civil War ===
The Civil War came to Cirencester in February 1643 when Royalists and Parliamentarians came to blows in the streets. Over 300 were killed, and 1,200 prisoners were held captive in the church. The townsfolk supported the Parliamentarians but gentry and clergy were for the old order, so that when Charles I of England was executed in 1649 the minister, Alexander Gregory, wrote on behalf of the gentry in the parish register, "O England what did'st thou do, the 30th of this month".

At the end of the war, King Charles II spent the night of 11 September 1651 in Cirencester, during his escape after the Battle of Worcester on his way to France.

=== Modern history ===
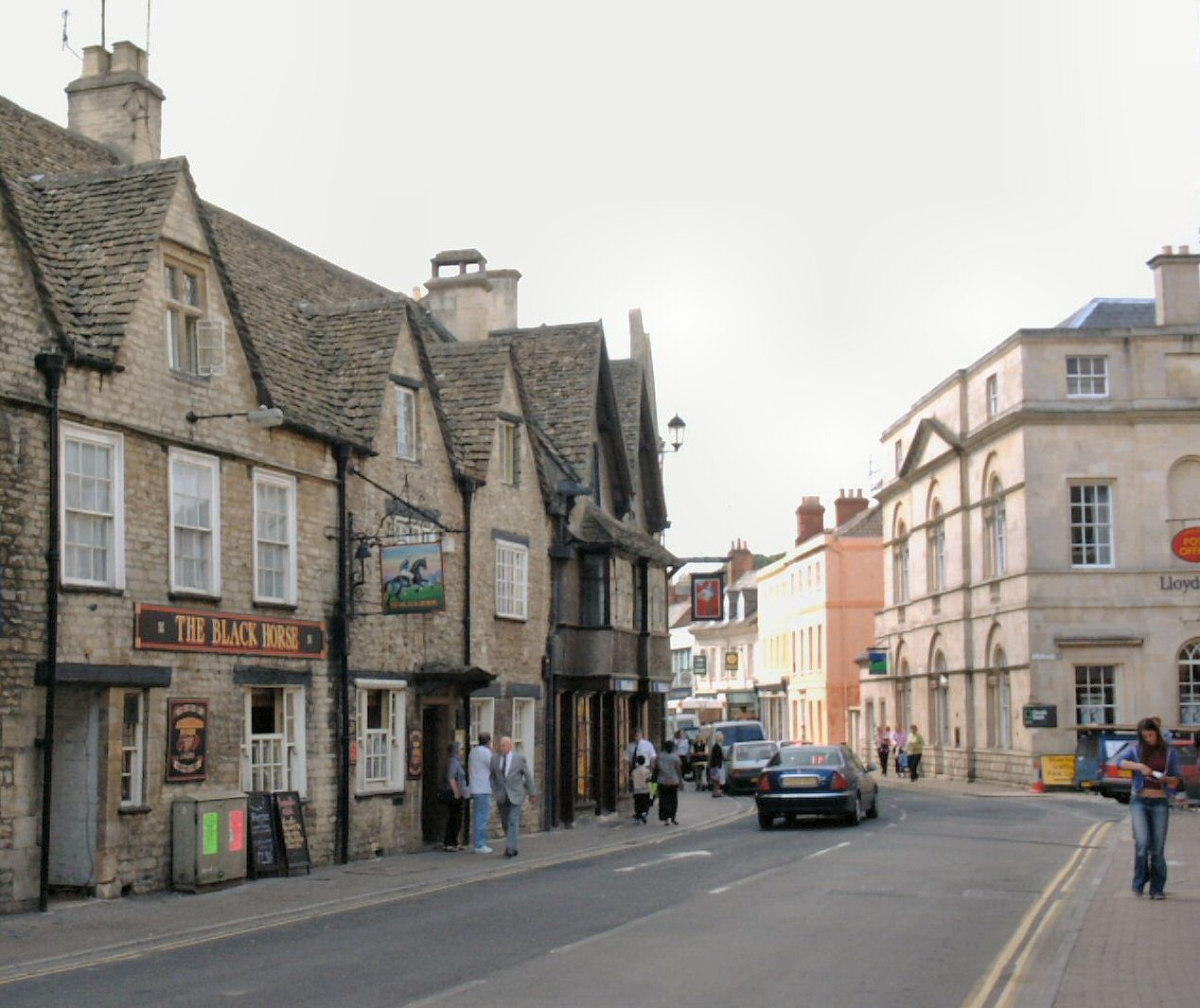
Cotswold stone buildings in Castle Street

At the end of the 18th century, Cirencester was a thriving market town, at the centre of a network of turnpike roads with easy access to markets for its produce of grain and wool. From 1461, Cirencester Grammar School provided a grammar school education for those who could afford it, and businesses thrived in the town, which was the market town for the surrounding area.

In 1789, the opening of the Cirencester branch (or "arm") of the Thames and Severn Canal provided access to markets further afield, by way of a link through the River Thames. In 1841, a branch railway line was opened to Kemble to provide a link to the Great Western Railway at Swindon. The Midland and South Western Junction Railway opened a station at Watermoor in 1883. Cirencester thus was served by two railway lines until the 1960s.

The loss of the canal and the direct rail link encouraged dependency on road transport. An inner ring road system was completed in 1975, in an attempt to reduce congestion in the town centre, which has since been augmented by an outer bypass with the expansion of the A417 road. Coaches depart from London Road for Victoria Coach Station in central London and Heathrow Airport, taking advantage of the M4 Motorway. Kemble station, which lies to the west of the town, is served by fast trains from London Paddington via Swindon.

The passing of the Local Government Act 1894 at last brought into existence the town's first independent elected body, the Cirencester Urban District Council. A reorganisation of local government in 1974 replaced the Urban District Council with the present two-tiers of Cotswold District Council and Cirencester Town Council, sitting below Gloucestershire County Council.

Under the patronage of the Bathurst family, the Cirencester area, notably Sapperton, became a major centre for the Arts and Crafts movement in the Cotswolds. This was when the furniture designer and architect-craftsman Ernest Gimson opened workshops in the early 20th century, and Norman Jewson, his foremost student, practised in the town.

=== Archaeology ===
A 3,500-year-old Bronze Age spear was found in 2022 during landscaping at a Thames Water sewage works. Archaeologists also uncovered prehistoric pottery fragments, flint tools, and animal bones from the Bronze Age, Iron Age, and Roman period.

== Geography ==
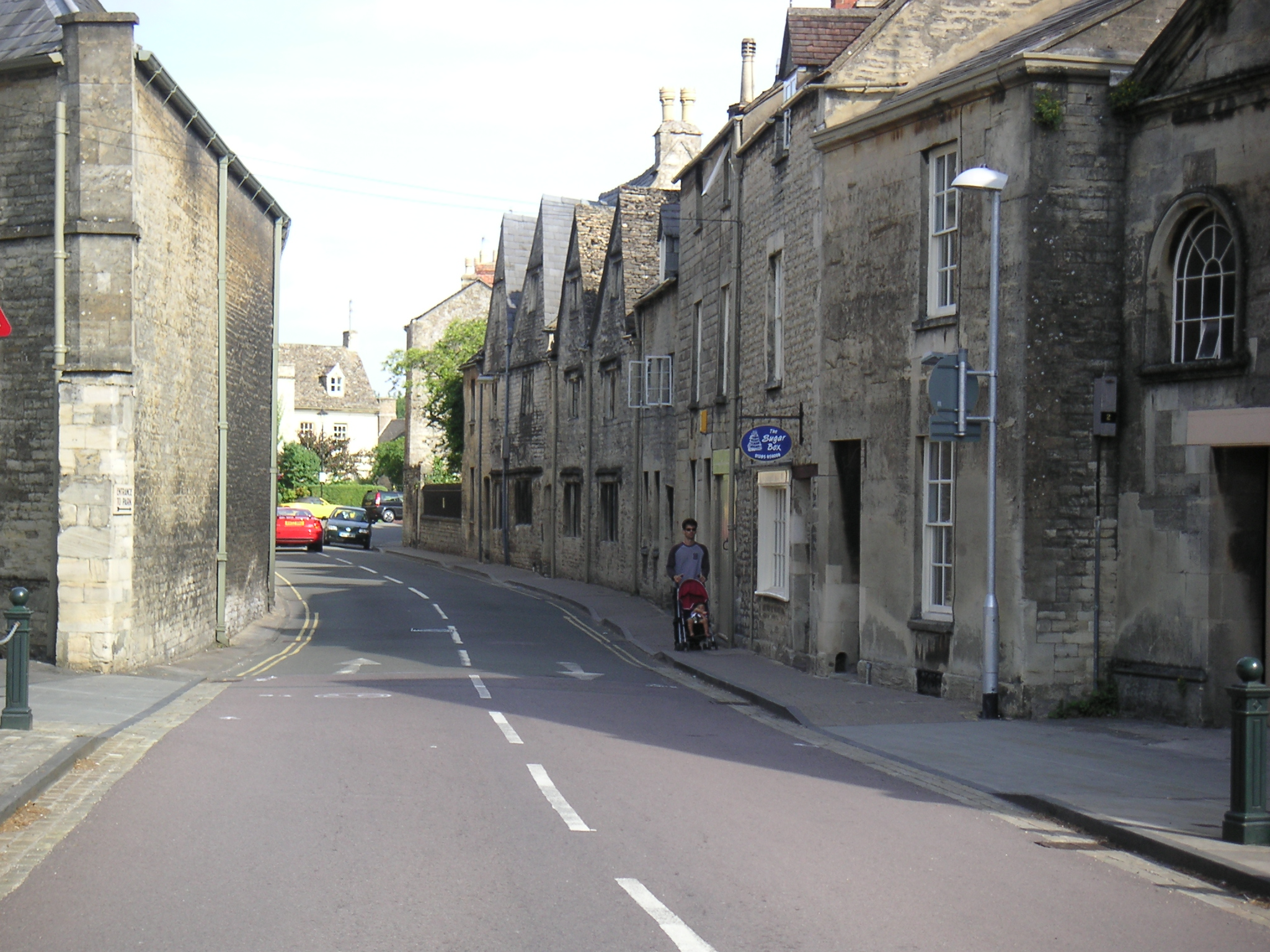
Park Street

Cirencester lies on the lower dip slopes of the Cotswold Hills, an outcrop of oolitic limestone. Natural drainage is into the River Churn, which flows roughly north to south through the eastern side of the town and joins the River Thames near Cricklade, a little to the south. The Thames itself rises just a few miles west of Cirencester.

The town is split into five main areas: the town centre, the village of Stratton, the suburb of Chesterton (originally a village outside the town), Watermoor and The Beeches. The village of Siddington to the south of the town is now almost contiguous with Watermoor. Other suburbs include Bowling Green and New Mills. The area and population of these five electoral wards are identical to that quoted above. The town serves as a centre for surrounding villages, providing employment, amenities, shops, commerce and education; it is a commuter town for larger centres such as Cheltenham, Gloucester, Swindon and Stroud.

=== Climate ===
Climate data for Cirencester (1991–2020, extremes 1959–2023)
Month	Jan	Feb	Mar	Apr	May	Jun	Jul	Aug	Sep	Oct	Nov	Dec	Year
Record high °C (°F)	14.8 (58.6)	18.4 (65.1)	21.6 (70.9)	25.7 (78.3)	26.8 (80.2)	32.0 (89.6)	37.8 (100.0)	34.0 (93.2)	31.1 (88.0)	27.5 (81.5)	17.1 (62.8)	14.9 (58.8)	37.8 (100.0)
Mean daily maximum °C (°F)	7.4 (45.3)	8.0 (46.4)	10.7 (51.3)	13.7 (56.7)	16.8 (62.2)	19.8 (67.6)	22.3 (72.1)	21.8 (71.2)	18.9 (66.0)	14.5 (58.1)	10.3 (50.5)	7.7 (45.9)	14.3 (57.7)
Daily mean °C (°F)	4.3 (39.7)	4.7 (40.5)	6.7 (44.1)	9.0 (48.2)	11.9 (53.4)	14.8 (58.6)	17.0 (62.6)	16.7 (62.1)	14.3 (57.7)	10.8 (51.4)	7.1 (44.8)	4.7 (40.5)	10.2 (50.4)
Mean daily minimum °C (°F)	1.2 (34.2)	1.3 (34.3)	2.6 (36.7)	4.2 (39.6)	7.0 (44.6)	9.7 (49.5)	11.7 (53.1)	11.6 (52.9)	9.6 (49.3)	7.0 (44.6)	3.8 (38.8)	1.6 (34.9)	6.0 (42.8)
Record low °C (°F)	−14.1 (6.6)	−11.1 (12.0)	−10.0 (14.0)	−5.6 (21.9)	−3.9 (25.0)	0.0 (32.0)	3.1 (37.6)	2.8 (37.0)	−0.6 (30.9)	−4.0 (24.8)	−9.4 (15.1)	−12.0 (10.4)	−14.1 (6.6)
Average precipitation mm (inches)	82.9 (3.26)	58.1 (2.29)	55.5 (2.19)	55.6 (2.19)	64.1 (2.52)	59.1 (2.33)	59.0 (2.32)	67.3 (2.65)	58.4 (2.30)	84.1 (3.31)	88.8 (3.50)	89.8 (3.54)	822.6 (32.39)
Average precipitation days (≥ 1.0 mm)	13.1	10.6	10.3	10.3	10.2	9.2	8.9	10.6	9.5	12.4	13.5	13.3	131.8
Mean monthly sunshine hours	57.3	76.0	114.6	162.9	191.7	186.9	199.0	173.0	139.4	102.5	65.2	55.1	1,523.5
Source 1: Met Office
Source 2: Starlings Roost Weather

== Sites of interest ==
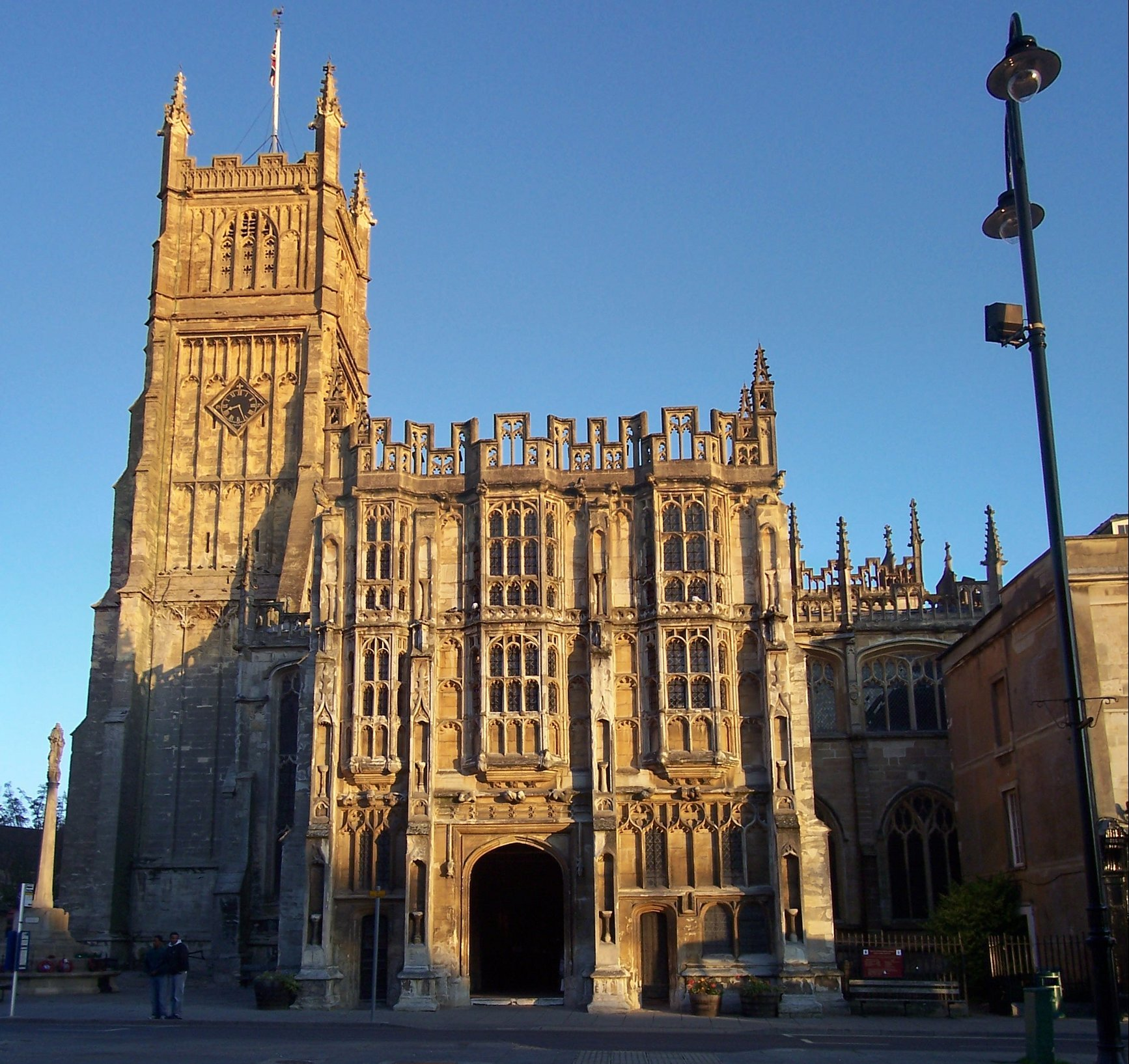
St John the Baptist parish church

The Grade I listed Church of St. John the Baptist is renowned for its Perpendicular Gothic porch, fan vaults and merchants' tombs.

The town also has a Roman Catholic church dedicated to St Peter; the foundation stone was laid on 20 June 1895. Coxwell Street to the north of Market Square was the original home of the Baptist Church that was founded in 1651, making it one of the oldest Baptist churches in England; the church moved in January 2017 to a new building on Chesterton Lane. The town's Salvation Army hall in Thomas Street occupies the former Temperance Hall built by the Quaker Christopher Bowly in 1846; it is the oldest such hall in the West of England. The Salvation Army first met in Cirencester in 1881.

To the west of the town is Cirencester Park, the seat of Earl Bathurst and the site of one of the finest landscape gardens in England; it was laid out by Allen Bathurst, 1st Earl Bathurst after 1714. He inherited the estate from his father, Sir Benjamin Bathurst, a Tory MP and statesman; he made his wealth from his involvement in the slave trade through the Royal Africa Company and the East India Company.

Abbey House was a country house built on the site of the former Cirencester Abbey following its dissolution and demolition at the Reformation in the 1530s. The site was granted in 1564 to Richard Master, physician to Elizabeth I. The house was rebuilt and altered at several dates by the Master family, who still own the agricultural estate. By 1897, the house was let and it remained in the occupation of tenants until shortly after the Second World War. It was demolished in 1964.

On Cotswold Avenue is the site of a Roman amphitheatre which, while buried, retains its shape in the earthen topography of the small park setting. Cirencester was one of the most substantial cities of Roman-era Britain.

The Corn Hall was designed by Medland, Maberly and Medland and completed in 1863.

== Governance ==
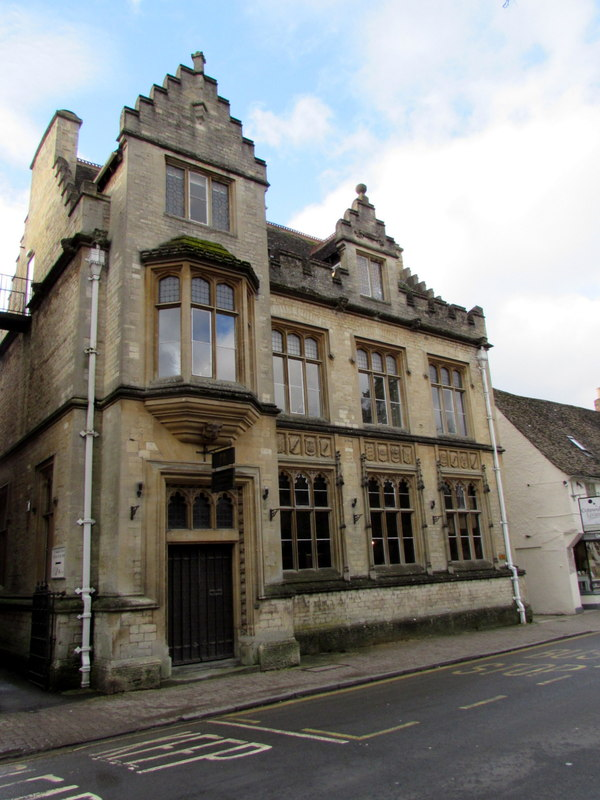
The former municipal offices in Gosditch Street

Before 1974, the town was administered by Cirencester Urban District Council, which was initially based in the upper floors of the south porch of the Church of St. John the Baptist. The council moved to offices in Castle Street in 1897 and to offices in Gosditch Street in 1932. In the 1974 reorganisation of local government, the urban district council was replaced by the new Cotswold District Council and Cirencester Town Council was created as the first tier of local government.

The Liberal Democrats won all of the eight available Cirencester seats on Cotswold District Council in May 2013.

Liberal Democrat candidate Joe Harris, aged 18, was elected to the district council for Cirencester Park Ward in May 2011, and became the youngest councillor in the country. Harris was also elected to the county council in the 2013 elections, winning the Cirencester Park Division.

== Transport ==
=== Roads ===
Cirencester is the hub of a road network with routes to Gloucester (A417), Cheltenham (A417/A435), Warwick (A429), Oxford (A40 via the B4425 road), Wantage (A417), Swindon (A419), Chippenham (A429), Bath (A433) and Stroud (A419). The A417 also connects Cirencester to the M5 motorway at junction 11A, whilst the A419 connects the town to the M4 motorway at junction 15 east of Swindon. It is also signed from the M4 at junction 17 with the A429.

=== Buses ===
Bus operators serving Cirencester include:

- Stagecoach West, which operates the 58 Circular service, connecting the town centre and Stratton
- Cotswold Green, which runs services between Cirencester and Stroud.

=== Railway ===
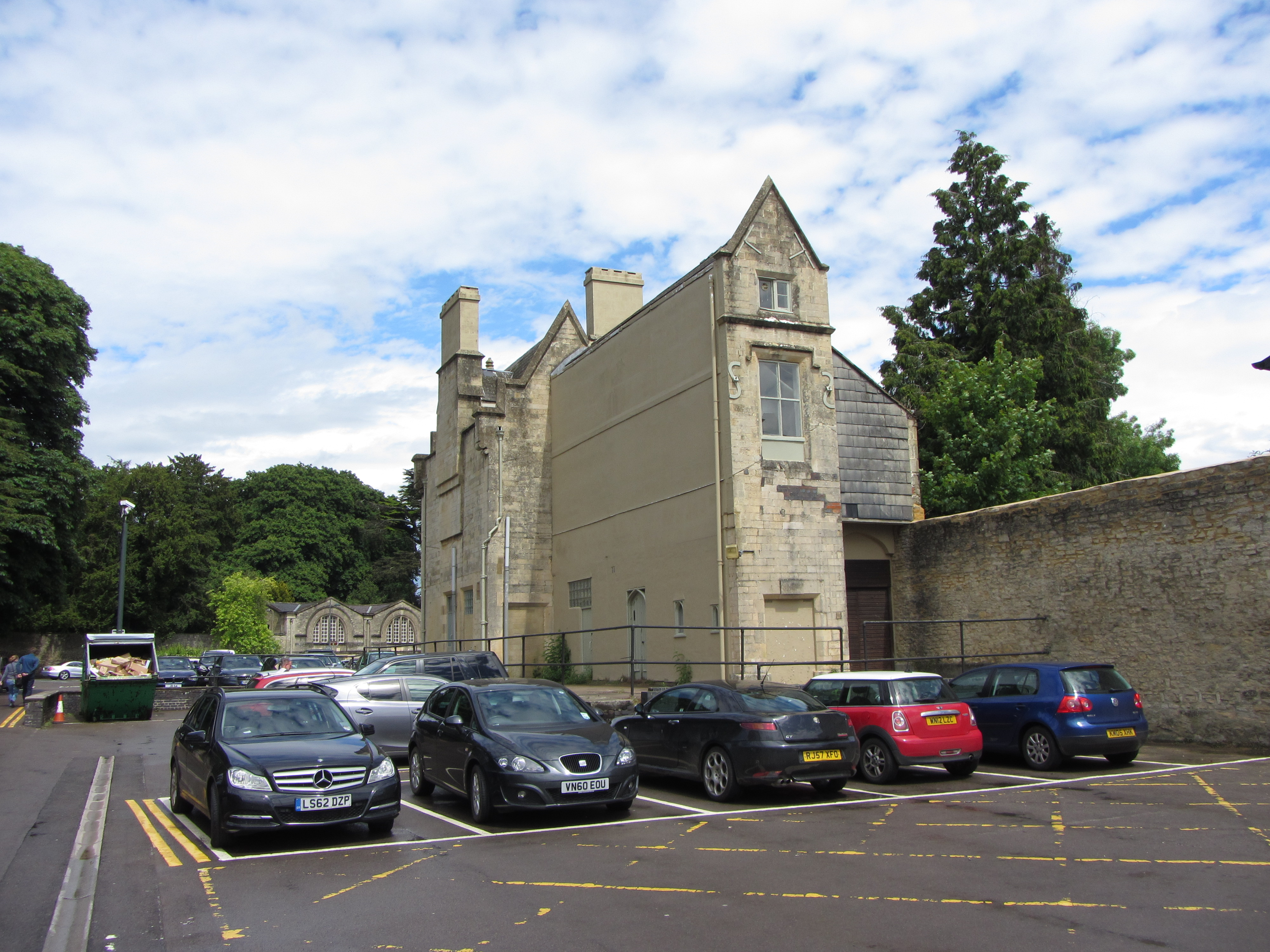
The former Cirencester Town station building in 2014

Since Cirencester Watermoor station was closed in 1961 and the Kemble to Cirencester branch line to Cirencester Town station was closed to passengers in 1964, the town has been without its own station. The nearest station is now at Kemble, 3.7 miles (6 km) away. It is served by regular Great Western Railway trains between London Paddington and Gloucester.

There is an active campaign to restore the line from Kemble to Cirencester.

=== Air ===
The nearest international airport is Bristol. Cotswold Airport, for general aviation, is around 5 miles (8 km) to the south-west, near Kemble.

== Education ==
The town and the surrounding area have several primary schools and two secondary schools, Cirencester Deer Park School on Stroud Road and Cirencester Kingshill School on Kingshill Lane. The nearby independent school Rendcomb College, closed in 2026. The town used to have a 500-year-old grammar school, which in 1966 joined with the secondary modern to form Cirencester Deer Park School. In 1991, Cirencester College was created, taking over the joint sixth form of Cirencester Deer Park and Cirencester Kingshill schools and the Cirencester site of Stroud College; it is adjacent to Deer Park School on Stroud Road.

Until 1994, the town had a private preparatory school, Oakley Hall. Run in its later years by the Letts family, it closed in 1994 shortly after the retirement of R. F. B. Letts who had led the school since 1962. The grounds of the school are now occupied by housing.

The Royal Agricultural University campus is between the Stroud and Tetbury Roads.

== Culture ==
The Sundial Theatre at Cirencester College, the Bingham Hall and the Barn Theatre host drama and musical events by community groups and professional companies.

TinkCo (formerly Cirencester Operatic Society and Theatre Ink), Cirencester Philharmonia Orchestra, Cirencester Band, Cirencester Male Voice Choir and Cirencester Creative Dance Academy are also based in the town.

=== Media ===
Local news and television programmes are provided by BBC West and ITV West Country from the Mendip TV transmitter and the local relay transmitter. The town's local radio stations are BBC Radio Gloucestershire, Heart West, and Corinium Radio which is an online community radio station. The local newspaper is The Wilts & Gloucestershire Standard.

== Sport ==
Cirencester Town F.C. plays in the Southern League Premier Division. The team, known as The Centurions, moved in 2002 from their former ground at Smithsfield on Tetbury Road to the purpose-built Corinium Stadium. It is designated by The Football Association as a Community Club. As well as the main pitch, there are six additional football pitches, mainly used by the junior football teams. The club has also developed a full-size indoor training area, known as The Arena, which is used for training, for social events and for five-a-side leagues throughout the year.

Cirencester has two athletics clubs: Cirencester Athletics & Triathlon Club and Running Somewhere Else.

Cirencester Ladies Netball Club has three squads: the A team play in the 1st division of the Gloucestershire League, the B team in the 3rd division and the C team in the 5th division.

The Rugby Club are based at the Whiteway; they have four main teams, a colts, a Youth and Mini sections.

Cirencester Park Polo Club, founded in 1896, is the oldest polo club in the UK. Its main grounds are located in Earl Bathurst's Cirencester Park. It was used by The Prince of Wales and his sons The Duke of Cambridge and Duke of Sussex.

Cirencester hosted its first closed road half marathon in November 2025 with 1,168 participants. In February 2026, Cirencester hosted its first closed road 10K run.

== Twin towns ==
Cirencester is twinned with the town of Itzehoe, Germany; the commune of Saint-Genis-Laval, a suburb of Lyon, France; and the city of Bathurst, Australia.

== Notable people ==
- Pam Ayres, poet, actor, broadcaster
- Elizabeth Brown, astronomer
- Willie Carson, retired jockey, television commentator
- Rev. Dr. John Clinch, clergyman-physician, the first man to practice vaccination in North America
- Charlie Cooper, actor, writer
- Daisy May Cooper, actor, writer
- Frank Cadogan Cowper, the 'Last Pre-Raphaelite Artist'
- Jacquie de Creed, stuntwoman
- Peter Maxwell Davies, composer, director of music at Cirencester Grammar School from 1959 to 1962
- Grace Hadow, suffragette, scholar and author
- Dom Joly, comedian, journalist, broadcaster
- Autumn Kelly (formerly Phillips), former wife of minor royal Peter Phillips
- William Sinclair Marris, civil servant, colonial administrator, classical scholar
- Mike Patto, musician
- Cozy Powell, drummer
- Lewis Charles Powles, artist
- Michael Sleggs, actor
- Theophila Townsend, Quaker writer and activist
- John Woolrich, composer.
