= Cirencester Amphitheatre =

Ancient Roman amphitheater in Cirencester, England

Coordinates: 51.7115°N 1.9722°W

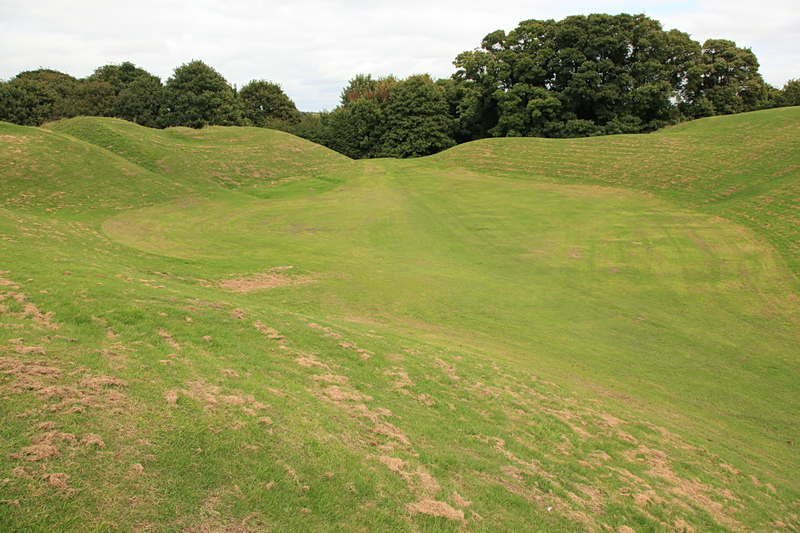
The remains of the Roman amphitheatre at Cirencester, in 2012

Cirencester Amphitheatre was a Roman amphitheatre in Cirencester, Gloucestershire, England. Its remains are scheduled as an ancient monument.

Archaeological digs have uncovered the earthworks, revealing the outline of the construction, which is still visible, with the banking reaching 25 feet from the bottom of the arena. The arena itself is approximately 150 feet (46 m) by 135 feet (41 m). Roman artefacts including coins and pottery have been discovered on the site. It is estimated that it was constructed towards the beginning of the 2nd century.

Location of Cirencester Amphitheatre, shown alongside the layout of walls and streets of Roman Corinium Dobunnorum, over a modern map of Cirencester

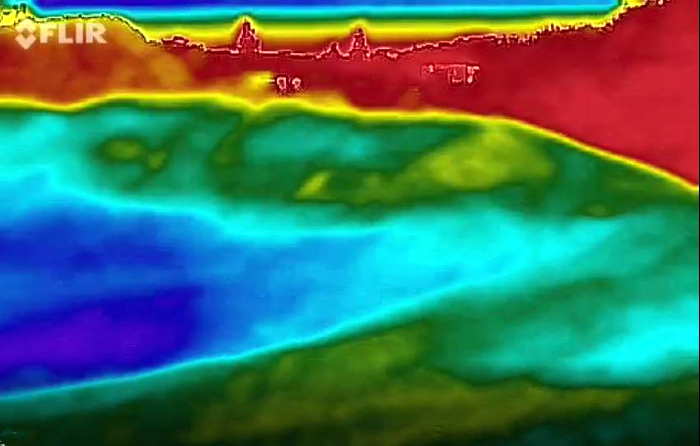
A view of the excavation area on the north-east quadrant: a thermal image captured in darkness

In Roman Britain, Cirencester was known as Corinium Dobunnorum, and was the second biggest town in Britannia, after Londinium (London). This amphitheatre is also the second largest, which indicates the significance of the location in Roman times. Although only slightly larger in diameter than the amphitheatre in Silchester, it has much higher sides. The earthworks show evidence of tiered wooden seats for around 8,000 people, placed upon terraces made of stone, although a timber-only structure may have existed before the 2nd century. There are two entrances, at the north-east and south-west ends of the stadium.

During the 5th century, when the Western Roman Empire was under attack and soldiers returned to Rome to defend it, the amphitheatre was fortified to defend against the invading Saxons. Wooden structures were erected within the arena, placed in postholes, and the north-east entrance was partly blocked.

Unlike other amphitheatres, it is aligned in parallel to the streets of the town.

== Purpose and origins ==
It has taken a long time for the real purpose of the earthworks to be identified, as the mounds were not clearly Roman, and the location amongst other quarried areas confused the situation for antiquarians. The site has been referred to as the 'Bull Ring', and a reason often given for this is the idea that the sport of bull-baiting used to take place there. The name, and the association with bull-baiting goes back to at least 1780 (noted by Samuel Rudder), but just as often thought unlikely, e.g. by Rev John Skinner who thought it derived from bul, a term he suggested meant an agger or bank to defend a ford. With or without the possibility of bull baiting, it was not until 1800 that its identity as a Roman amphitheatre was suggested, when Rudder made a more detailed study of the site. In 1824 Skinner made the first archaeological investigation, but found little evidence of stone seating or high quality workmanship. He did however identify the nearby Roman quarry and 'Romanized British Cemetery', for which subsequent excavation has given ample evidence.

Following a number of other small-scale investigations in the later 19th century, there was little that was definitively known, with recurring doubts as to whether the site was indeed an amphitheatre. Excavation was much talked about, but with no action, apart from an impromptu tunnel dug by youths during World War I, which they later said had found a well-built wall within a mound. It was only with the rise of the Cirencester Excavation Committee that any organised archaeology became possible. Under the leadership of J. S Wacher, followed by Alan McWhirr, a series of 1960s digs revealed a construction dating to the early 2nd century AD, a major rebuild towards the middle of the century and a new gateway and some side chambers (for gladiators or wild beasts, potentially) towards the end of that century. Some 200 years later, around 350–60 there is evidence of demolition of the chambers and walls and by the mid-400s the gates were being narrowed, possibly suggesting a more defensive function.

== Public access ==
In 2012, plans were announced by the Cirencester Town Council to improve access and signage at the site. Further plans for a visitor centre and car park followed in 2014.

== See also ==
- List of Roman amphitheatres
