= Corinium Dobunnorum =

British settlement of the Roman Empire at Cirencester

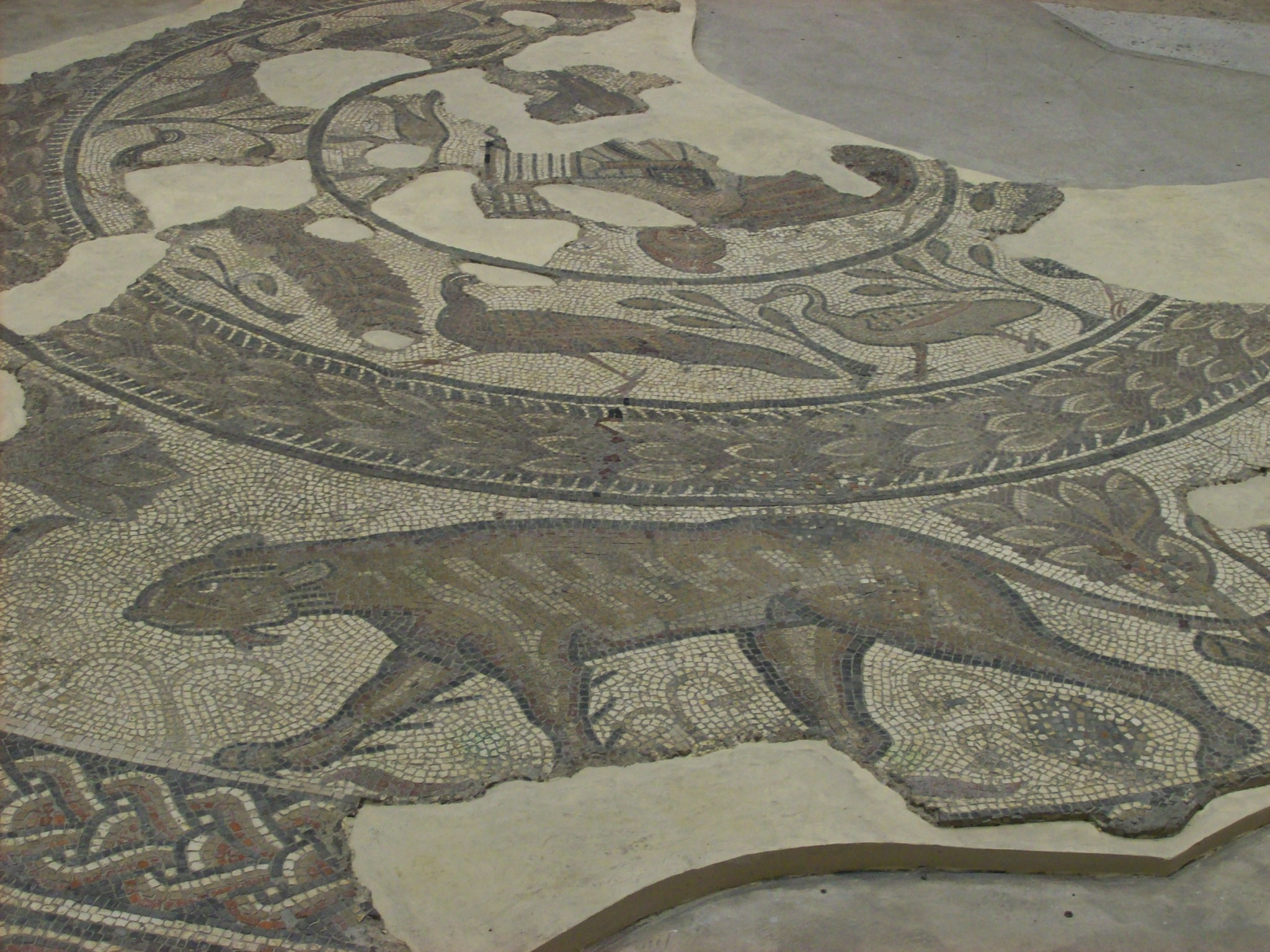
- A Roman mosaic in the Corinium Museum in Cirencester

- Location within England
- 51°43′08″N 01°58′05″W
- Type: Settlement
- Periods: Roman Imperial
- Location: Cirencester, Gloucestershire, England
- Region: Britannia

History
- Built: Mid-70s CE
- Abandoned: Possibly around 430

Corinium Dobunnorum was the Romano-British settlement at Cirencester in the present-day English county of Gloucestershire. Its 2nd-century walls enclosed the second-largest area of a city in Roman Britain. It was the tribal capital of the Dobunni and is usually thought to have been the capital of the Diocletian-era province of Britannia Prima (Britannia I).

== Etymology ==
The name is first attested by Ptolemy around 150 CE, though the earliest surviving manuscripts are from the thirteenth century. These give various slightly different spellings, of which the original seems to have been Κορίνιον (Corinion). The meaning of this name is, however, unknown.

== Roman fort ==
A Roman fort was established at Corinium in the territory of the friendly tribe of the Dobunni about a year after the Roman conquest of Britain. The main settlement in the area at the time was the hillfort at Bagendon. Three main Roman roads met in Corinium: the Fosse Way, Akeman Street, and Ermin Way.

== Tribal capital ==
Plan of the layout of walls and streets of Roman Corinium, shown over a modern map of Cirencester. It remains unclear if the grid of Roman streets ever occupied the whole of the walled area.

By the mid-70s CE, the military had abandoned the fort and the site became the tribal capital (civitas) of the Dobunni. Over the next twenty years, a street grid was laid out and the town was furnished with an array of large public stone buildings, two market places, and numerous shops and private houses. The forum and basilica were bigger than any other in Britain, apart from Londinium's.

The basilica was decorated with beautifully carved Corinthian capitals, Italian marble wall veneers and Purbeck Marble mouldings. Unfortunately, it was built over the ditch of the old fort and the walls cracked and sank, forcing a major rebuilding project in the mid-2nd century.

There appears to have been a cattle market adjoining the forum with a market hall and several butchers' shops. A system of wooden water pipes indicates there was also an aqueduct but no public baths have been identified. The amphitheatre stood to the south-east of the town in the area now called the Querns. It was built on the site of an old quarry aligned with the street grid, an unusual feature.

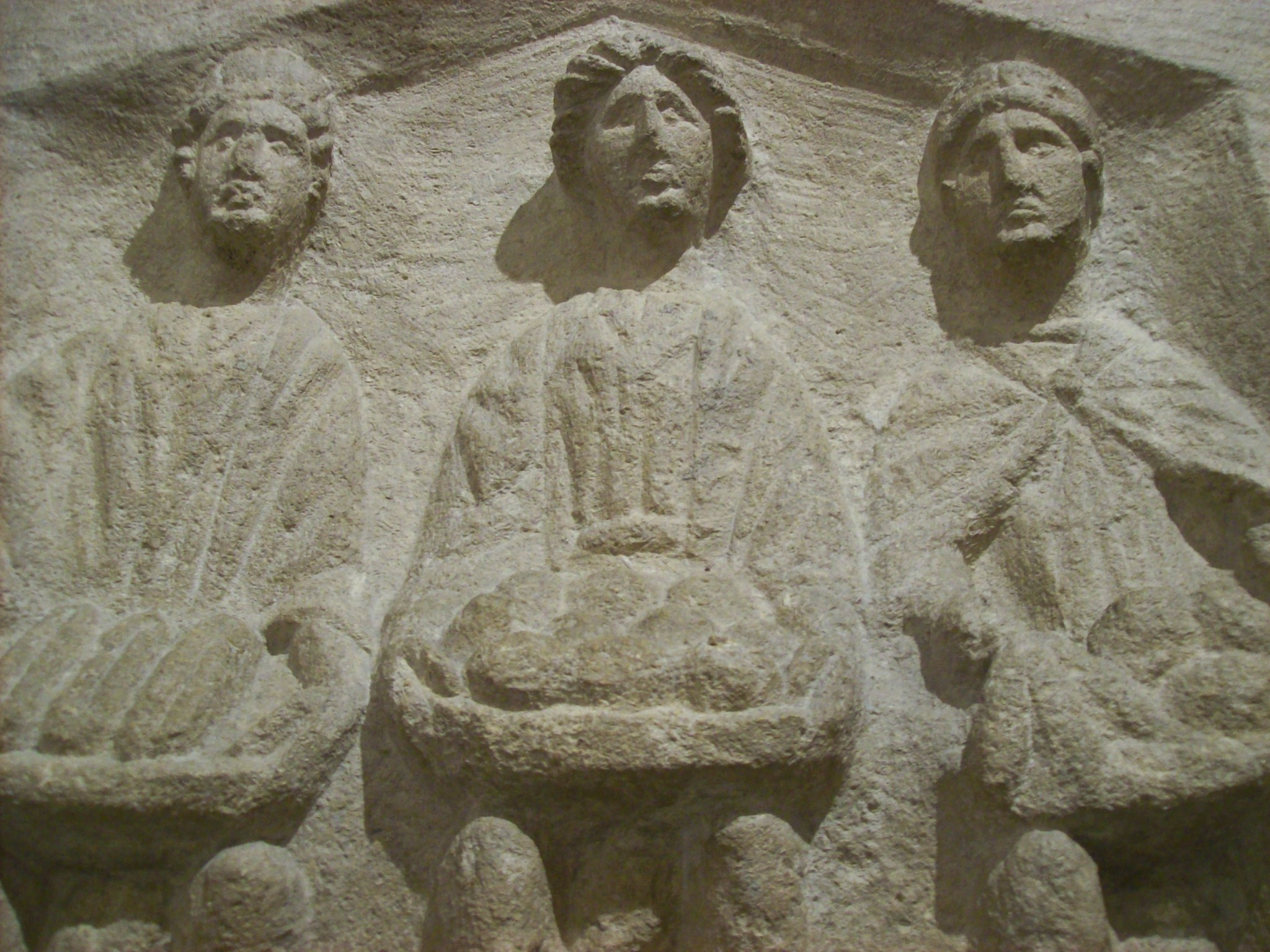
Three Goddesses or Matres. Roman high relief sculpture, Corinium Museum, Cirencester

As yet, no temples have been located, although numerous fine sculptures show much religious activity in the town. The missing Christian bishop represented by a deacon at the Council of Arles in 314 may come from Corinium.

The town was fortified in the late 2nd century. There were five gates and polygonal towers were later added to the walls. About fifty years after their construction, there appears to have been a partial collapse and the complex was largely rebuilt to include small chambers around the circuit. These may have been animal pens, convict cells, or small shrines.

Corinium seems to have been the home to a number of very early private stone houses of wealthy individuals. Some date from the 110s. Such buildings continued to be built and occupied throughout the life of the town, but were particularly luxurious during the 4th century, when mosaic floors and fine sculpture were much in evidence.

It has been suggested that the town was the centre of both a stone-carving industry, under a certain Sulinus son of Brucetus, and a mosaic industry with two schools of art, based on images of the saltire and Orpheus. There were also bakers, glass makers, blacksmiths and goldsmiths within the walls.

== Provincial capital ==
Development continued until the 4th century. It remains unclear just where the Diocletian-era provinces of the Diocese of "the Britains" were located, but Corinium is now usually thought to have been the capital of Britannia Prima.

== Later history ==
Around 350, the amphitheatre, which was probably then derelict, was converted into a large storage and work space. Its eight metre wide entrance was rutted and periodically repaired, showing that it was heavily used. It was last resurfaced after 399-402. Around the time of the Roman withdrawal from Britain in 410, the town walls were repaired and the forum continued to be regularly cleaned. It was finally abandoned around 430. The amphitheatre was the site of a large timber building associated with 5th and 6th-century pottery. It may have been the fortified retreat of King Cyndyddan who fought at the Battle of Dyrham in 577.

== Remains ==
- The grass-covered bowl of the amphitheatre, also known as the "Bull Ring", is in the care of English Heritage.
- A small section of the old Roman wall can be seen in the Abbey Park.
- A large collection of Roman items found from Corinium by residents, antiquarians and archaeologists. Many of these are on display in the Corinium Museum, Cirencester. This includes an array of mosaic floors, carved and inscribed stone slabs, columns, capitals and objects from the everyday life of the Roman townspeople.
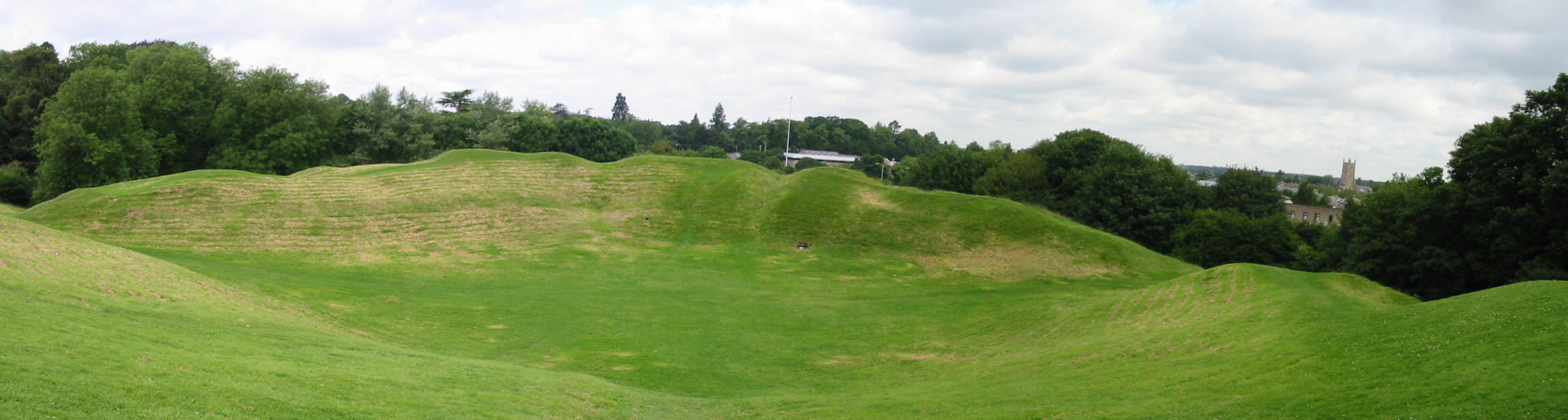
The Roman amphitheatre at Corinium Dobunnorum

== Roman Road Pattern Anomolies ==
Theorised location shift for Corinium or its original fort, based on deviations of the Roman Road network, which appears to avoid a pre-Roman burial site.

When archaeologists considered the line of the five Roman Roads that converged on Corinium, they have been puzzled by the unexpected turns and diversions that the roads make as they approach the town. Wacher in 1965, Reece and Catling in 1975, Wacher and McWhirr in 1982 and Darvill and Holbrook in 1994 all drew attention to the issue, and hoped some direct evidence might emerge to clarify things. In 1998 G. H. Hargreaves made a lengthy review of the Cirencester Roman Roads, specifically focussing on the surveying techniques employed by the 1st century Roman military. As described, the Roman system avoided curves at all costs, so all Roman roads are composed of straight sections, meeting at 'Alignment Angles'. The surveyor was able to use an instrument known as a groma with remarkable precision to plot a straight route, or a required shift in direction, to optimise the line of the road between two locations. With this in mind, the multiple unexpected alignment angles shown in the map on the right were, it is suggested, not the optimised lines set out by the original road surveyors. Along the whole length of the Fosse Way, for example, this is the only instance where the road makes multiple switches, to depart from, and then regain its alignment. The dates and order with which Ermin Way and Fosse Way were surveyed and established is unknown, but they and Akeman Street may all have been established within the first decade or so after the arrival of the Romans in 43AD.

Hargreaves suggested that perhaps a compelling advantage emerged for building the Corinium Fort west of the river Churn, which then required these 'secondary diversions' to the road layout. In 2003 Richard Reece proposed a scenario (shown in the map on the right) in which the lines of each of the roads had originally been intended to converge at a fort site east of the River Churn, that to all appearances would serve well for that purpose. However the location is occupied by two (or more) pre-Roman burial mounds known as Tar Barrows, and the site may have been of sufficient local status and importance that the Romans were persuaded, or preferred, to build their fort at an alternative location across the river, and divert the various roads to avoid the burial area. Whether it had other advantages, the 'new' location certainly had a major drawback, namely the braded channels of the River Churn. It continues to have a significant flood risk, and required huge effort by Roman engineers to cut a new channel to divert the river around the growing town. This, if the scenario is accepted, suggests there was a compelling reason to redesign the road system and switch to a new fort location. The earliest known fort, from around 60AD, and now known as Leaholme Fort, was indeed built to the west of the river, at the cross-roads of the 'diverted' roads, and this became the nucleus of the later walled Roman town.

There has been no tangible confirmation that such a scenario was the cause of the current location and road pattern for Corinium. A decade or so of road use along the pre-diversion roads, before any ditches and surfacing had happened, may have left no evidence. Similarly, there is little known about the Tar Barrows site that would indicate such a special status. So the proposal remains an unproven possibility. Could a rather 'unRomanlike' compromise to local sensibility explain the equally unRomanlike winding road network around Corinium?

== Bibliography ==
- Fleming, Robin (2021). The Material Fall of Roman Britain 300-525 CE. Philadelphia, PA: University of Pennsylvania Press. ISBN 978-0-8122-5244-6.
- McWhirr, Alan, Roman Gloucestershire, Gloucester 1981 ISBN 0-904387-63-1, 21-58
- Wacher, John (1995). The Towns of Roman Britain. London: B T Batsford.
- "Cirencester Excavations Series". Cotswold Archaeology.
  - Wacher, John; McWhirr, Alan (1982). Early Roman Occupation at Cirencester (Report). Cirencester Excavations. Vol. I. Cotswold Archaeological Trust. ISBN 0950772208.
  - McWhirr, Alan; Viner, Linda; Wells, Calvin (1982). Romano-British Cemeteries at Cirencester (Report). Cirencester Excavations. Vol. II. Cotswold Archaeological Trust. ISBN 0950772216.
  - McWhirr, Alan (1986). Houses in Roman Cirencester (Report). Cirencester Excavations. Vol. III. Cotswold Archaeological Trust. ISBN 0950772224.
  - Wilkinson, David; McWhirr, Alan (1998). Cirencester Anglo-Saxon Church and Medieval Abbey (Report). Cirencester Excavations. Vol. IV. Cotswold Archaeological Trust. ISBN 0950772224.
  - Neil Holbrook, ed. (1998). Cirencester: the Roman Town Defences, Public Buildings and Shops (Report). Cirencester Excavations. Vol. V. Cotswold Archaeological Trust. ISBN 0952319632.
  - Neil Holbrook, ed. (2008). Excavations and Observations in Roman Cirencester 1998-2007 (Report). Cirencester Excavations. Vol. VI. Cotswold Archaeology. ISBN 9780955353420.
  - Holbrook, Neil; Wright, Jamie; McSloy, E.R.; Geber, Jonny (2017). The Western Cemetery of Roman Cirencester: excavations at the former Bridges Garage, Tetbury Road, Cirencester, 2011-2015 (Report). Cirencester Excavations. Vol. VII. Cotswold Archaeology. ISBN 9780993454530.
