= John Clinch =

- Born: January 9, 1749; Cirencester, England
- Died: November 22, 1819 (aged 70); Trinity, Newfoundland, British North America
- Medical career
- Profession: clergyman, physician, poet

John Clinch (January 9, 1749 – November 22, 1819) was a clergyman-physician credited with being the first man to practice vaccination in North America.

== Biography ==
He was born in Cirencester, England, one of twin children of Thomas Clinch of Bere Regis in Dorset. In 1798 he administered the first smallpox vaccines at Trinity, Newfoundland. Clinch had attended school in Cirencester with the vaccine pioneer Edward Jenner, and both had then studied medicine under John Hunter.

Clinch also compiled a glossary of the Beothuk language containing over 100 words.

He died in 1819 in Trinity, Newfoundland.
