= List of settlements in Gloucestershire by population =

The 24 largest settlements of the county of Gloucestershire, with its city in bold, and district centres in yellow.

This is a list of settlements in Gloucestershire by population based on the results of the 2011 census. The next United Kingdom census will take place in 2021. In 2011, there were 23 built-up area subdivisions with 5,000 or more inhabitants in Gloucestershire, shown in the table below.

== Population ranking ==
#	Settlement	Borough/District	Population	
#	Settlement	Borough/District	2001	2011
1	**Gloucester**	Gloucester	123,590	136,362
2	**Cheltenham**	Cheltenham	110,260	116,447
3	**Kingswood^{*}**	South Gloucestershire	105,706	87,190
4	**Filton**	South Gloucestershire	51,420	59,495
5	**Stroud**	Stroud	31,412	32,670
6	**Yate**	South Gloucestershire	30,463	30,022
7	**Tewkesbury**	Tewkesbury	16,830	19,778
8	**Cirencester**	Cotswold	15,860	16,325
9	**Frampton Cotterell / Winterbourne**	South Gloucestershire	14,100	14,694
10	**Dursley**	Stroud	13,790	14,542
11	**Innsworth**	Tewkesbury	12,998	13,458
12	**Bishop's Cleeve**	Tewkesbury	12,210	13,273
13	Downend**	South Gloucestershire	10,409	12,125
14	**Thornbury**	South Gloucestershire	11,969	11,687
15	**Cinderford**	Forest of Dean	10,069	10,508
16	**Lydney**	Forest of Dean	8,960	8,776
17	**Nailsworth**	Stroud	7,190	7,728
18	Staple Hill**	South Gloucestershire	6,823	7,338
19	**Stonehouse**	Stroud	7,318	7,400
20	**Chalford**	Stroud	6,628	6,876
21	**Wotton-under-Edge**	Stroud	5,574	5,627
22	**Tetbury**	Cotswold	5,250	5,472
23	**Coleford**	Forest of Dean	5,109	5,103
24	**Winchcombe**	Tewkesbury	4,379	4,538

Notes:

* This is the parliamentary constituency count. It groups nearly all the urban suburb areas east of Bristol. Borders changed in 2010 which reflected in the 2011 reduction. See talk page for further discussion

** Contiguous with Kingswood. Council ward counts

== See also ==
- Gloucestershire
