= Corinium Museum =

Museum in Gloucestershire, England

Coordinates: 51°42′50″N 1°58′35″W

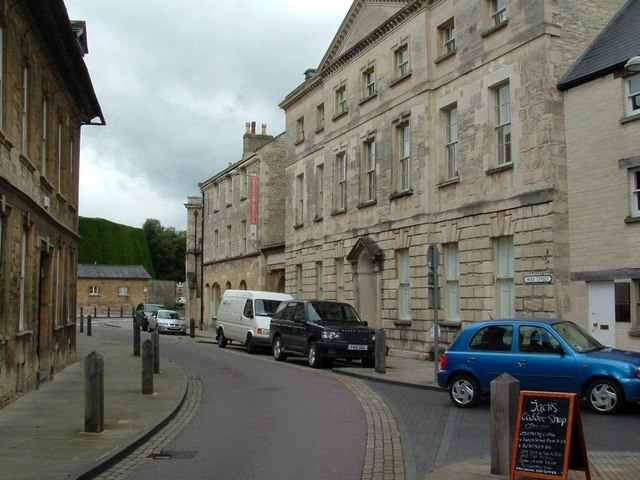
- Established: 1938
- Location: Cirencester
- Collection size: over 60,000 objects
- Director: Emma Stuart
- Website: http://www.coriniummuseum.org

The Corinium Museum, in the Cotswold town of Cirencester in England, has a large collection of objects found in and around the locality. The bulk of the exhibits are from the Roman town of Corinium Dobunnorum, but the museum includes material from across the Cotswold District as early as the Neolithic and all the way up to Victorian times.

Location of Corinium Museum, shown within the layout of walls and streets of Roman Corinium, over a modern map of Cirencester.

== Origins ==
Two private museums came into being from the mid-nineteenth century in Cirencester, and both were the result of the increasing quantity of Roman artifacts coming to light as the town developed. In 1856 the Bathurst family of Cirencester Park built a museum (still extant but no longer a museum) on Tetbury Road to house the two Roman Mosaics (Hunting Dogs and Spring Mosaics) that had recently been found under Dyer Street. Later Wilfred Cripps, a member of a prosperous Cotswold wool merchant family, with his wife Helena, began collecting some of the many Roman items that were being found, and in 1889 built an extension to their substantial home on Thomas Street to house them. The gradual expansion of housing to the south of the town centre, onto areas that had been undisturbed since Roman times, was one source of material. Alongside this, there were the works needed for the Railway, which arrived in 1841 and an on-going process of installing drainage, water supply, gaspipes and later electricity supplies, each of which required ditches which cut through the archaeological layers and brought more finds to light. Both museums had their adherants. The Cripps sent reports of new finds to Professor F Haverfield at Oxford, while the 5th Earl Bathurst became a member of the British Archaeological Association and served a term as president in 1868.

=== A Public Museum ===
The two collections were finally combined in 1938, the result of 80 years of collecting by the two families, in a newly built museum constructed in the grounds of Abberley House. As well as donating the contents of the two collections, the successor members of the Cripps and Bathurst families also donated the new site to Cirencester Urban District Council, who undertook to build the 100 feet (30 m) by 40 feet (12 m) building at a cost of nearly £4,000, with display cases paid for by a grant from the Carnegie Trust. The next big expansion was when it was gifted to Cotswold District Council and re-opened on 26 November 1974 by the Duke of Gloucester, Further refurbishments took place as part of the 'Corinium Project' in 2002-2004 following a successful Heritage Lottery grant and other funding. The early galleries were redeveloped as a capital project called 'Stone Age to Corinium' in 2018- 2020, following another successful National Lottery Heritage Fund grant with generous donations and other grant funding. The museum has a collection of 2nd- to 4th-century Roman mosaic floors and sculptural carvings, as well extensive displays of Roman objects, large and small.

Throughout the museum, there are displays covering prehistory across the Cotswolds, the Iron Age including objects from the Iron Age hillfort at Bagendon, an Anglo-Saxon gallery which largely profiles the rich objects unearthed at the Anglo-Saxon burial ground at Butler's Field in Lechlade. The medieval gallery explores the medieval Cirencester Abbey with the rise of the wool trade featuring prominently in later galleries.

Part of the current museum building, which was built in the mid-18th century, was previously a house called Abberley House. It is a Grade II listed building

== Gallery ==
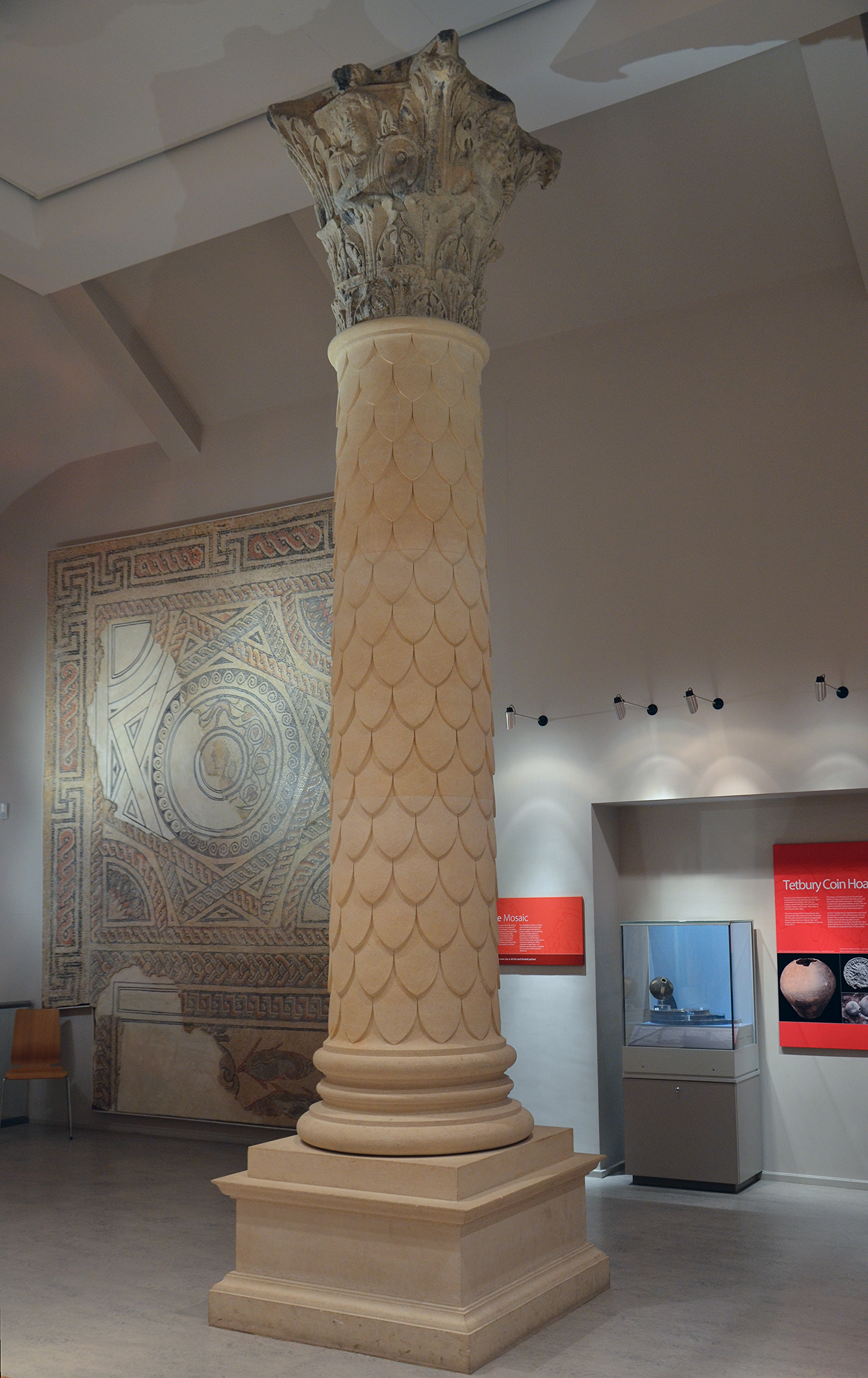
Reconstructed column known as the Jupiter Column. The Corinthian Capital stood on such a column in the Forum of the Roman town.

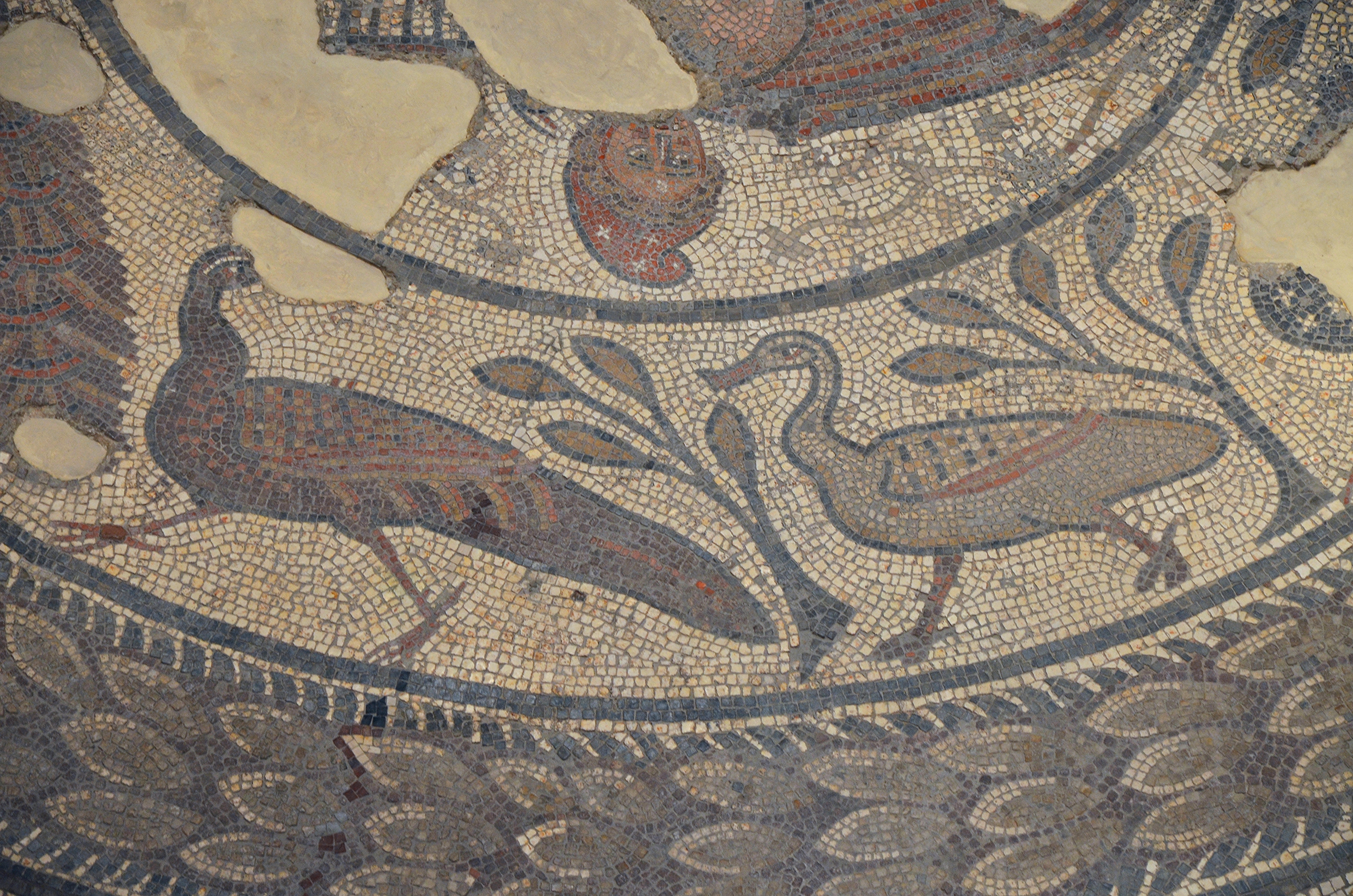
One of the many mosaics now housed in the museum. This from the 4th century is known as the 'Orpheus Mosaic', and was found at Barton Farm, just outside Cirencester, in 1824/25.

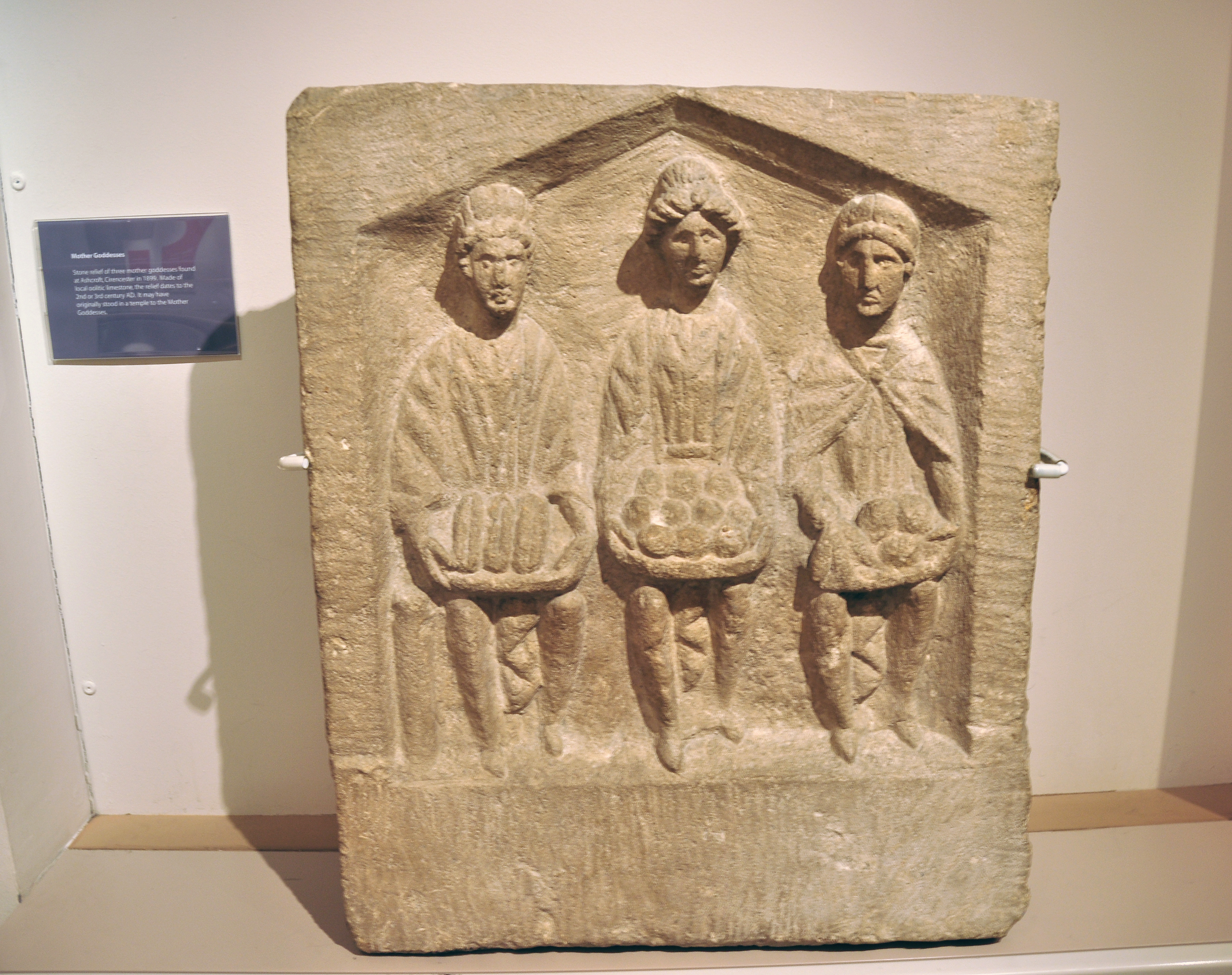
The relief sculpture of three seated women is from 2nd or 3rd Century Cirencestor, found in 1899 in Ashcroft, and would have been part of a shrine to the Matres (Mother Goddesses).

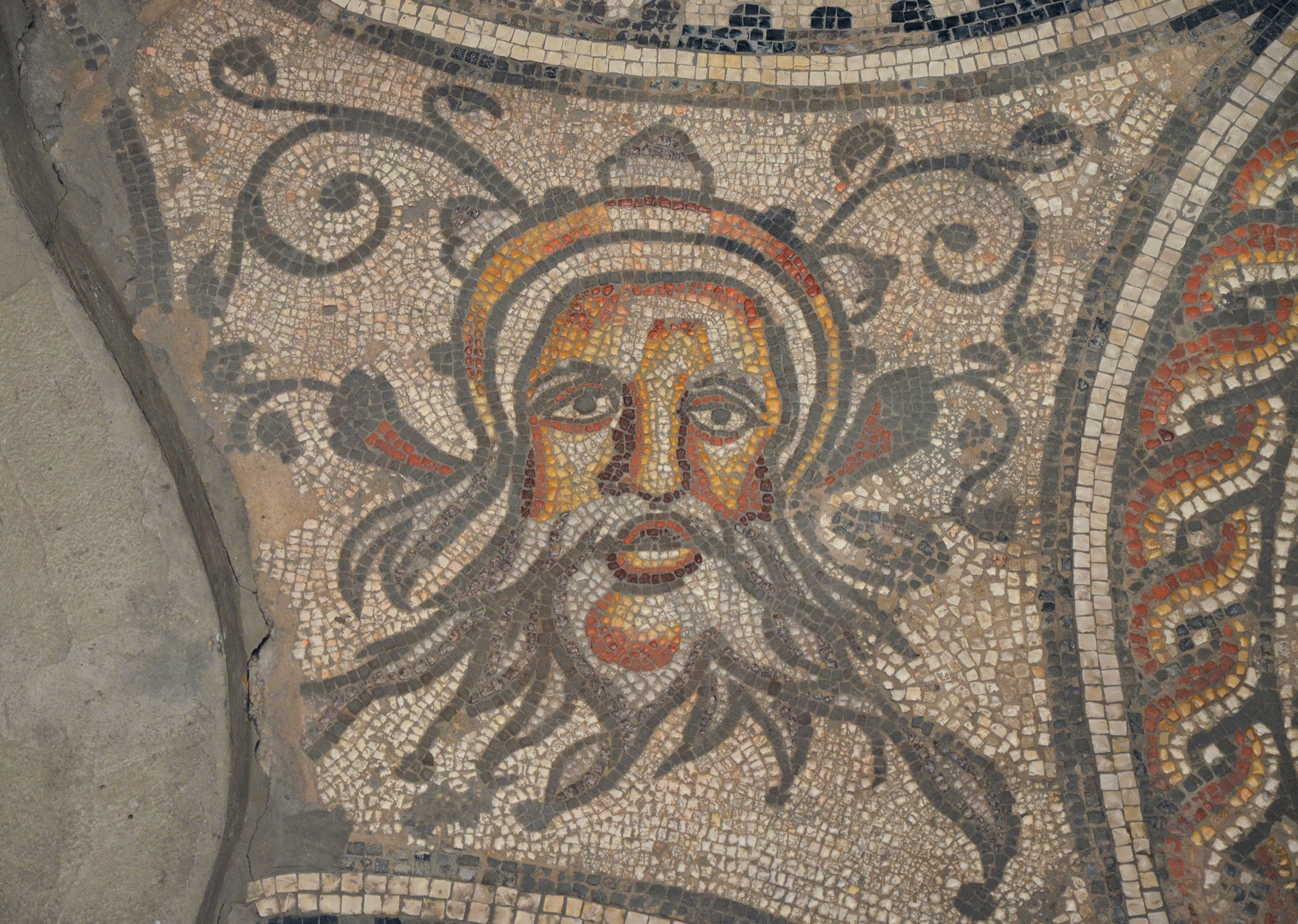
Detail from the 'Hunting Dogs Mosaic'. It was one of two mosaics found under Dyer Street, Cirencester in 1849, and was a driving force in the foundation of the first Corinium Museum. The image is of Oceanus, a sea god.
