= Querns area, Cirencester =

Coordinates: 51°42′40″N 1°58′10″W

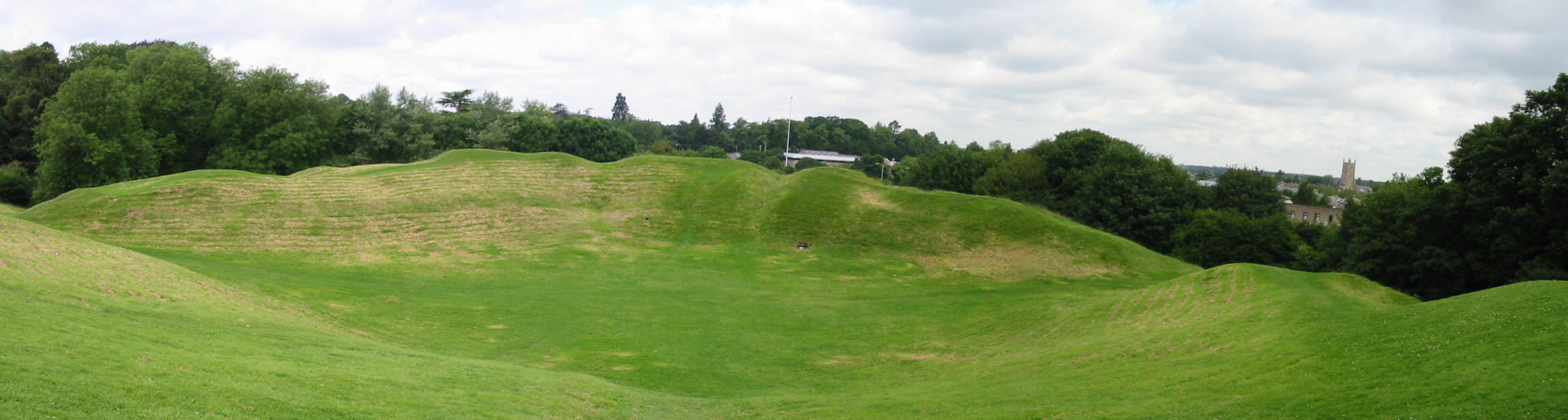
The remains of the Roman amphitheatre, in 2002

The Querns is an area of Cirencester, an ancient market town in the Cotswold hills of England.

Its principal feature is Cirencester Amphitheatre, an impressive ancient monument that is surrounded by many other archaeological features, most notably the extensive Roman quarries and a huge Roman cemetery, now largely buried beneath the Cirencester ring road.

== Etymology ==
A quern is a quarried stone use to grind course grain.

The name 'Querns' is a direct descendant of the Anglo-Saxon word crundles, meaning a quarry, albeit a very distorted version. The evolution of this name can be traced through various historical documents, evolving from Crundles, to Crondles, Cronnes, and Cornes, with the modern name 'Querns' emerging in the 17th century. Thus the linguistic memory of the one-time use of the area has been preserved over more than 1,500 years since quarrying last took place in the area.

The Roman quarries cover the side of what was once a shallow hill descending into town, and run for over half a mile, their extent still recognisable by steep, rugged ground and pleasant, wooded terrain that has been spared the modern development that has taken place in fields surrounding the Querns.

== See also ==
- Roman Britannia
