= Theophila Townsend =

Quaker writer and activist

Theophila Townsend (1656 – 1692) was a Quaker writer, preacher, and activist from Cirencester, Gloucestershire, England.

== Background ==
Townsend lived at a time of upheaval in Britain—which, during her lifetime or shortly before she was born, saw the English Civil War, Commonwealth of England, and Restoration—and persecution for the Quakers.

The Society of Friends was relatively new in the mid- to late 17th century; as an organised movement, it had emerged only in the early 1650s. A number of laws, including the Corporation Act 1661, the Act of Uniformity 1662, and the Conventicle Acts 1664 and 1670, limited freedom of religion for Nonconformist Protestants such as the Quakers.

Many Quaker women published in the mid-17th century, in no small part due to progressive beliefs among the Friends as to gender equality. They were frequently jailed, assaulted, and publicly humiliated for preaching and adhering to Quaker liturgical practices.

== Life and activism ==
Townsend was frequently jailed for preaching and speaking publicly on behalf of the Quakers. Near-contemporary chronicles document her imprisonment in 1678, for preaching (at trial, she reportedly asked the judge 'Whether it was a Crime to direct People to turn from Ungodliness'); sometime in 1681; and at Gloucester Castle, then the county gaol, as of 12 March 1682. In 1683, she was due to be released at a court of session but was swiftly recommitted when she refused to deliver the oath of allegiance. She was released from prison in April 1686 following a Declaration of Indulgence by James II.

Townsend's husband Richard, a bodice-maker, was also frequently arrested for offences that included participation in Quaker meetings.

Joseph Besse, in his catalogue of Quaker persecutions, described Townsend as 'a virtuous Woman, and of great Understanding'.

== Writing ==
Townsend's surviving writings are pamphlets or broadsides, often styled as testimonies memorialising the deeds of Quaker contemporaries including her 'dear friend' Joan Vokins, Jane Whitehead, and her neighbour Amariah Drewet.

In A Testimony Concerning the Life and Death of Jane Whitehead (1676), she uses prophetic language—which would likely have been subject to censorship under a system implemented within the Quaker movement, starting in the early 1670s. A 1717 chronicle by Willem Sewel recounts another episode of prophecy, in which 'by order of the justices Thomas Cutler and James George, she being seized in the street, said to the latter, "that the Lord would plead her cause, and that what measure he meted, should be measured to him again"'. According to this account, George's wife died shortly thereafter.

In An Epistle of Love (1680), she advises mothers to serve as strong religious role models for their children.

In her 1687 work A Word of Counsel, she adopts an antinomian view.

== Works ==
- Townsend, Theophila (1676). A Testimony Concerning the Life and Death of Jane Whitehead. London – via British Library.
- Townsend, Theophila (1680). An Epistle of Love to Friends in the Womens [sic] Meetings in London. London.
- Townsend, Theophila (1687). A Word of Counsel. London.
- Townsend, Theophila (1688). Some Testimonies of the Life, Death and Sufferings of Amariah Drewet. London: Andrew Sowle.
- Townsend, Theophila (1690). An Epistle of Tender Love to All Friends that Are Tender Hearted. London: Thomas Northcott.
- Townsend, Theophila (1871) [1691]. "A Testimony Concerning Joan Vokins". In Sansom, Oliver (ed.). God's Mighty Power Magnified: As Manifested and Revealed in His Faithful Handmaid Joan Vokins. Cockermouth: D. Fidler. pp. xi–xvi.

== Sources ==
- Besse, Joseph (1753). A Collection of the Sufferings of the People Called Quakers. Vol. 1. London: L. Hinde.
- Feroli, Teresa; Thickstun, Margaret Olofson, eds. (2018). Witness, Warning, and Prophecy: Quaker Women's Writing, 1655–1700. Toronto: Iter Press. ISBN 978-0-86698-584-0.
- Garman, Mary Van Vleck (1 September 2013). Quaker Women's Lives and Spiritualities. Oxford: Oxford University Press. doi:10.1093/oxfordhb/9780199608676.013.0155.
- Roberts, Daniel (1898) [1746]. Lawrence, Edmund T. (ed.). A Quaker of the Olden Time. London: Headley Brothers.
