= Henry Trinder =

English international rugby union player

- Born: Henry Richard Trinder; 14 April 1989 (age 37) Swindon, England
- Height: 1.84 m (6 ft 0 in)
- Weight: 93 kg (14 st 9 lb)
- School: Cirencester Kingshill School Hartpury College

Rugby union career
- Position: Outside centre
- Current team: Gloucester; Dallas Jackals
Senior career
Years	Team	Apps	(Points)
2007–2021	Gloucester	162	(225)
2007	→Moseley	13	(50)
2021	Vannes		
2021–	Ampthill		
2022	Dallas Jackals		
International career
Years	Team	Apps	(Points)
2008–2009	England U20s	8	(35)
2010–2011	England Saxons	3	(5)
2014	England		
- Correct as of 12 February 2022

Henry Richard Trinder (born 14 April 1989) is an English rugby union player for Ampthill in the RFU Championship. He also plays for the Dallas Jackals in Major League Rugby (MLR) in the United States. His regular position as at centre.

== Professional career ==
Trinder's first appearance for Gloucester was a brief substitute appearance at Edgeley Park when he came on for Leon Lloyd towards the end of the 2007–08 season. The following season he started four times, covering for Mike Tindall when he was with England or injured.

In 2017/18, Trinder was awarded try of the week in Week 6 for his try against Northampton Saints and again in Week 14 for his try against Leicester Tigers.

Trinder was called up to the England national side for the uncapped annual fixture against the Barbarians in May 2014.

On 12 April 2021, after 13 years playing at Kingsholm, it was confirmed that Trinder would leave Gloucester to sign for Vannes in the Pro D2 competition in France as a medical joker for the rest of the 2020–21 season.

In August 2021 it was announced that he had signed for RFU Championship side Ampthill as a player-coach.
