= Cirencester Kingshill School =

Location
- Kingshill Lane; Cirencester, Gloucestershire, GL7 1HS; England; 51.71689°N 1.94437°W

Information
- Type: Academy
- Motto: Shaping Greater Futures
- Established: 1976
- Department for Education URN: 137217 Tables
- Ofsted: Reports
- Head teacher: J. Lindley
- Staff: 100
- Age: 11 to 16
- Enrolment: 819
- Website: www.cirencesterkingshill.gloucs.sch.uk

Cirencester Kingshill School is an academy school located on the south east side of Cirencester, Gloucestershire, in England. Opened in 1976 by the Princess Royal, it is one of two secondary schools serving Cirencester and the surrounding area.

The school won the School Achievement Award for 2003.

The school received an Ofsted inspection in May 2013 and was graded as "Good" in all categories by the inspection team. It had been rated "Outstanding" in November 2007.

== Background ==
When opened, the school admitted 120 pupils each year. This was later raised to 135, and has increased since 1996 to 159 new admissions per year. The school in 2012 had an overall enrollment of 802 pupils.

The school has been a Foundation School since September 1999. In 2000, it was named as an Outstanding School in the HMCI annual report. It went on to become a Beacon School and was the first school in Gloucestershire to gain the Eco-Award.

In September 2002, the school received its first specialism, gaining Sports College status. This provided funding for a new sports hall, changing rooms and other sports facilities. In 2006, the school became a Science College and earned creditability in Raising Achievement Transforming Learning.

== Curriculum ==
Throughout Key Stage 3 (years 7 to 9), pupils are taught in mixed ability groups except for mathematics and modern languages. All pupils study English, mathematics, science, history, geography, design and technology, German or French, religious education, physical education, art, drama, music, information and communication technologies, personal, social and health education and information technology.

In their second year (year 8), pupils with high language skills can begin to study a second language (French, Spanish or German).

When students reach Key Stage 4 (years 10 to 11), they work towards their GCSEs. Pupils can choose up to three or four subjects to study, depending on their ability. They will study the core subjects, which are science, mathematics, English language and literature, PE, and Respect. The other three or four choices include art, design and technology, modern languages, drama, music, RE, history, geography, PE, childcare, music and computing. A BTEC diploma in sport course is also available.

== Notable former pupil ==
Henry Trinder, the Gloucester Rugby player
