= Cirencester Town Council =

Parish council in Gloucestershire, England

Type
- Type: Town council

Leadership
- Mayor: Cllr Andy Jopp
- Deputy Mayor: Cllr Steven Colledge
- Chief Executive: Andrew Tubb

Structure
- Seats: 16 Councillors
- Liberal Democrat: 10 / 16
- Green: 2 / 16
- Independent: 4 / 16

Elections
- Voting system: First past the post
- Last election: May 2023

Meeting place
- Bingham Gallery, Dyer Street, Cirencester

Website
- www.cirencester.gov.uk

Cirencester Town Council is a parish council in Gloucestershire formed in 1974, that serves an estimated 20,000 people. The town is divided into eight wards each electing two Councillors. The Councillors elect a Mayor each year who is also the chair of the council. The current mayor of Cirencester is Sarah Orr

== Responsibilities ==
Cirencester Town Council provide a variety of services and amenities for the town. These include management of CCTV, maintaining and improving parks, sport and recreation in the town, management of the historic charter and farmers markets, leading on community engagement and providing a youth service.

== Current composition ==
Cirencester Town Council is elected every four years. The Liberal Democrats won 14 of the 16 seats on Cirencester Town Council at the 2019 Local Elections. Rather than form a political group all councillors agreed to work apolitically. Many of the Town Councillors also serve on Cotswold District Council (8 out of 16) and two Councillors also serve on Gloucestershire County Council.

== Mayoral history ==
Years	Name	Party
2026–	Andy Jopp	Liberal Democrats
2024–2026	Sarah Orr	Liberal Democrats
2022-2024	Sabrina Dixon	Green
2021–2022	Claire Bloomer	Liberal Democrats
2019–2021	Patrick Coleman	Liberal Democrats
2017–2019	Nigel Robbins OBE	Liberal Democrats
2015–2017	Mark Harris	Liberal Democrats
2013–2015	Joe Harris	Liberal Democrats
2011–2013	Andrew Lichnowski	Liberal Democrats
2009–2011	Geoffrey Adams	Conservative
2007–2009	Shirley Alexander	Liberal Democrats
2005–2007	Norman Whereat	Independent
2003–2005	Deryck Nash	Liberal Democrats
2001–2003	Shirley Alexander	Liberal Democrats
1999–2001	Norman Whereat	Independent
1996–1999	Brenda Potter	Labour
1994–1996	Deryck Nash	Liberal Democrats
1992–1994	Aileen Calvert	Conservative
1990–1992	J.W Watson	Independent
1987–1990	Mavis Marshall	Independent
1986–1987	Michael Grace	Labour
1985–1986	G.E.J Bartlett	Liberal
1982–1985	R. Sharpes	Independent
1979–1982	W.J Waites	Independent
1976–1979	J.H Marshall	Independent
1975–1976	J.S Barker	Independent
1974–1975	Jack Pady J.P	Independent
1971–1974	Cyril W.H. Staite	Independent
