= Whortleberry =

Whortleberry may refer to the berries of several plants of genus Vaccinium:

- Vaccinium myrtillus, European bilberry or blue whortleberry
- Vaccinium vitis-idaea, lingonberry or red whortleberry
- Vaccinium uliginosum, bog whortleberry or bilberry
- Vaccinium scoparium, grouse whortleberry, grouseberry, little leaf huckleberry

== See also ==
- Bilberry
