= Newfoundland and Labrador Route 371 =

Highway in Newfoundland and Labrador, Canada

Route 371
- Millertown Junction Road

Route information
- Maintained by Newfoundland and Labrador Department of Transportation and Infrastructure
- Length: 19.9 km (12.4 mi)

Major junctions
- South end: Route 370 near Badger
- North end: Millertown Junction

Location
- Country: Canada
- Province: Newfoundland and Labrador

Highway system
- Highways in Newfoundland and Labrador
← Route 370	→ Route 380

Route 371, also known as Millertown Junction Road, is a 19.9-kilometre-long (12.4 mi) north–south highway in central Newfoundland in the Canadian province of Newfoundland and Labrador. It is an entirely unsigned, narrow, gravel road for its entire length, serving as the only access road to the community of Millertown Junction, connecting with Route 370 (Buchans Highway) at the other end. It is believed by some that this road has been abandoned, even though this is clearly not the case. There are no other major intersections or communities along the entire length of Route 371.

== Major intersections ==
Location	km	mi	Destinations	Notes
	0.0	0.0	Route 370 (Buchans Highway) to Route 1 (TCH) – Badger, Millertown, Buchans	Southern terminus
Millertown Junction	19.9	12.4	Dead End	Northern terminus
1.000 mi = 1.609 km; 1.000 km = 0.621 mi
