= Robert Roberts (cardiologist) =

Canadian cardiologist and geneticist

- Born: 9 July 1940 (age 85); Grole, Newfoundland
- Education: Memorial University of Newfoundland; Dalhousie University; University of Toronto
- Medical career
- Profession: physician, academic and medical researcher
- Field: cardiology; genetics
- Institutions: Washington University in St. Louis; Baylor College of Medicine; Dignity Health St. Joseph's Hospital and Medical Center; University of Arizona College of Medicine – Tucson; University of Ottawa Heart Institute
- Research: molecular cardiology
- Website: https://drrobertroberts.wordpress.com/

Robert Roberts (born 9 July 1940 in Grole, Newfoundland, Canada), is a cardiologist, geneticist, academic, and medical researcher.

== Education ==
Roberts completed his undergraduate at Memorial University of Newfoundland. He attended medical school at Dalhousie University and training in cardiology at University of Toronto in Canada. With a scholarship from the Canadian Heart Foundation he relocated to the U.S. to complete a research fellowship at the University of California-San Diego under the mentorship of Eugene Braunwald and Burton Sobel where he contributed to the clinical trial development of TPA, a first-line treatment for heart attacks. He then became Director of the Coronary Care Unit Barnes Hospital at Washington University in St. Louis (1972–1982) and was recruited by Michael DeBakey and Anthony Gotto to serve as Chief of Cardiology at Baylor College of Medicine in Houston, Texas (1982–2004), which he held for over two decades being one of the longest serving chiefs of cardiology in the US. In 2004, he returned to Canada to become C.E.O., President and Chief Scientific Officer of the University of Ottawa Heart Institute. (2004–2014).

== Career ==
Roberts is currently the chief executive officer of RDS Inc., executive director of the Heart and Vascular Institute and Director of Cardiovascular Genetics and Genomics at Dignity Health at St Joseph's Hospital & Medical Center, Chair of the International Society of Cardiovascular Translational Research at the University of Arizona College of Medicine, and a Professor of Medicine at the University of Arizona College of Medicine.

He served as co-editor of Hurst's The Heart for 25 years, which is the leading practitioner textbook for cardiologists while also being a member of numerous editorial boards for several journals including the current Editor-in-Chief of Current Opinion in Cardiology. For his research contributions, he has received many awards including the Distinguished Scientist of American College of Cardiology and election to the Academy of Scientists of the Royal Society of Canada. As of January 1, 2021, he has over 46,000 citations and a h-index of 105 on Google Scholar.

== Clinical practice ==
He was Director of the Coronary Care Unit at Barnes Hospital at Washington University in St. Louis from 1972 to 1982. He served as Chief of Cardiology at Baylor College of Medicine in Houston, Texas from 1982 to 2004, followed by President of the University of Ottawa Heart Institute, Ottawa, Canada, from 2004 to 2014.

== Research ==
Roberts conducted early research in the field of molecular cardiology on the genetic causes of heart disease.

His research is noted for developing the first quantitative assay for MBCK, which was the standard for diagnosing heart attacks in patients for more than three decades and continues to be used in many countries. Most of his research career was devoted to genetics and molecular biology of cardiovascular disorders which led him to several important discoveries, including the mapping of the first gene for atrial fibrillation (1997), the first gene for Wolff-Parkinson-White Syndrome (2001) and many others. His 1998 study on arrhythmogenic right ventricular dysplasia (ARVD) among the population of Grand Falls, Newfoundland and Labrador, Canada, led to the infamous Texas Vampires incident and resulted in a five-year suspension from clinical research by Baylor's Institutional Review Board.

His research is noted for developing the first quantitative assay for MBCK, which was the standard for diagnosing heart attacks in patients for more than three decades. Most of his research career was devoted to genetics and molecular biology of cardiovascular disorders which led him to several important discoveries, including the first gene for atrial fibrillation in 1997, the first gene for Wolff–Parkinson–White syndrome and many others. In 2007, he discovered the first gene for heart attacks (9p21) and since as part of an International Consortium has identified over 100 genetic factors that cause an elevated risk for heart disease in addition to the already commonly associated environmental factors such as cholesterol and smoking.

=== Texas Vampires Controversy ===
In 1998, Robert Roberts led a group of researchers from Baylor College of Medicine to conduct a study on arrhythmogenic right ventricular dysplasia (ARVD) among Grand Falls, Newfoundland and Labrador, Canada populations. The group arrived at Grand Falls to collect blood samples from community members to test for biomarkers indicating genetic predispositions of this condition. The study was extremely problematic due to procedures used by Roberts to procure the samples causing significant concerns about the informed consent process of the study. Evidence from an investigation initiated by Baylor's Institutional Review Board found that the consent process was largely skipped or done through medical intimidation by Roberts and his team. Participants also were not given results of the study despite many feeling that they might have died had they not taken part.

Following an internal investigation of this incident by Baylor's Institutional Review Board, Roberts was among three Baylor physicians suspended from clinical research for five years. The study also initiated a special subcommittee investigation of procedural and ethical aspects of the study led by Baylor's IRB and Ottawa Heart Institute which found protocol concerns "of a serious nature".

== Awards and honours ==
Roberts has authored over 900 publications in leading scientific journals and received several awards in recognition of his scientific contributions including the Distinguished Scientist Award from the American College of Cardiology (1998), McLaughlin Medal from the Royal Society of Canada (2008), Award of Meritorious Achievement from AHA (2001), Best of What's New by Popular Science (1994), and was elected to Fellow of the Academy of Science of the Royal Society of Canada (2013).
