= Newfoundland and Labrador Route 370 =

Highway in Newfoundland and Labrador, Canada

Route 370
- Buchans Highway

Route information
- Maintained by Newfoundland and Labrador Department of Transportation and Infrastructure
- Length: 73 km (45 mi)

Major junctions
- East end: Route 1 (TCH) at Badger
- Route 371 south of Millertown Junction
- West end: Buchans

Location
- Country: Canada
- Province: Newfoundland and Labrador

Highway system
- Highways in Newfoundland and Labrador
← Route 365	→ Route 371

Route 370, also known as the Buchans Highway, is a 73-kilometre-long (45 mi) east–west highway in the central portion of Newfoundland in the Canadian province of Newfoundland and Labrador. Its eastern terminus is the intersection at the Trans-Canada Highway (Route 1) in the Town of Badger, and the route ends at the Town of Buchans.

The intersection at the Trans-Canada Highway is very unusual in nature, with a median at the access, and motorists would face a stop signs at the Trans-Canada Highway intersection soon after a stop sign upon returning from their journey on Route 370.

== Route description ==
Route 370 begins at a Y-Intersection between Main Street and Lakeview Avenue in Buchans and heads east to leave the town, passing along the northern shores of Beothuk Lake for several kilometres, crossing the Buchans River and passing by Mary March Wilderness Park. It then passes through Buchans Junction, where it crosses the Mary March River and has an intersection with a local road leading to Millertown. The highway now winds its way through hilly rural terrain for several kilometres following the Exploits River, where it has an intersection with Route 371 (Millertown Junction Road), an unsigned gravel road. Route 370 enters Badger and crosses over a brook before passing through the town and ending at Route 1. As with most highways in Newfoundland and Labrador, Route 370 is entirely a two-lane highway.

== History ==
For a period of time late in the 20th century, Route 370 was expected to connect with Route 480, the Burgeo highway. The road was under construction by 1980; but unfortunately, for reasons beyond the Government of Newfoundland and Labrador's control, further construction was abandoned.

== Major intersections ==
Location	km	mi	Destinations	Notes
Buchans	0.0	0.0	Main Street / Lakeview Avenue	Western terminus
	25.4	15.8	Mary March Wilderness Park main entrance	Access road into park
Buchans Junction	30.6	19.0	Millertown Road (Route 370-11) - Millertown	
	57.3	35.6	Route 371 north (Millertown Junction Road) – Millertown Junction	Southern terminus of Route 371
Badger	73	45	Route 1 (TCH) – Deer Lake, Grand Falls-Windsor	Eastern terminus
1.000 mi = 1.609 km; 1.000 km = 0.621 mi
