= Buchans Junction =

Local Service District in Newfoundland and Labrador, Canada

Coordinates: 48.847°N 56.484°W

Location of Buchans Junction in Newfoundland and Labrador

Buchans Junction is a local service district and designated place in the Canadian province of Newfoundland and Labrador in the central part of the island of Newfoundland. It is on the banks of Mary March River near where the Mary March River flows into the northeast end of Beothuk Lake. The community is on a site first known as "Four Mile Siding" on the railway which was constructed in 1900 to connect the community of Millertown to the Newfoundland Railway at Millertown Junction. The site itself became a rail junction in 1927 when Asarco subsidiary, the Buchans Mining Company, completed a rail link from the newly formed mining town of Buchans. Ever since 1927, even after the Buchans Railway closed in 1977, the community has been known as "Buchans Junction".

The town is located approximately 42 kilometres southwest of the Trans-Canada Highway on Route 370. According to Statistics Canada, it had a population of 79 in 2011, with 45 private dwellings.

Clyde Wells, former Premier of Newfoundland, was born in Buchans Junction in 1937.

== Geography ==
Buchans Junction is in Newfoundland within Subdivision A of Division No. 6.

== Demographics ==
As a designated place in the 2016 Census of Population conducted by Statistics Canada, Buchans Junction recorded a population of 72 living in 38 of its 54 total private dwellings, a change of -8.9% from its 2011 population of 79. With a land area of 8.07 km^{2} (3.12 sq mi), it had a population density of 8.9/km^{2} (23.1/sq mi) in 2016.

== Government ==
Buchans Junction is a local service district (LSD) that is governed by a committee responsible for the provision of certain services to the community.

== See also ==
- List of communities in Newfoundland and Labrador
- List of designated places in Newfoundland and Labrador
- List of local service districts in Newfoundland and Labrador
