= Ruth McPherson =

Canadian lipidologist

Academic background
- Education: PhD, 1976, University of London; MD, University of Toronto
- Thesis: The effect of dietary fibre on plasma lipids (1976)

Academic work
- Institutions: University of Ottawa Heart Institute; University of Toronto; McGill University
- Main interests: cardiovascular genetics preventive cardiology

Ruth McPherson is a Canadian lipidologist and endocrinologist. She is the Merck Frosst Canada Chair in Atherosclerosis at the University of Ottawa Heart Institute. In 2007, McPherson led the discovery of the 9p21 genetic risk factor for cardiovascular disease.

== Early life and education ==
McPherson received her PhD from the University of London and her medical degree from the University of Toronto.

== Career ==
Following her subspecialty training, McPherson held academic positions at the University of Toronto and McGill University before joining the University of Ottawa Heart Institute (UOHI) in 1992. As the director of UOHI's Lipid Clinic and Lipid Research Laboratory in 2007, McPherson led the discovery of the 9p21 genetic risk factor for cardio-vascular disease. She later directed a collaborative study which identified 13 new genetic variants associated with coronary artery disease. McPherson was elected a Fellow of the Royal Society of Canada in 2014.

In 2019, McPherson received the Margolese National Heart Disorders Prize from the University of British Columbia for her "international impact on the genetic basis of coronary artery disease."
