= Texas Vampires =

1998 Canadian research ethics scandal

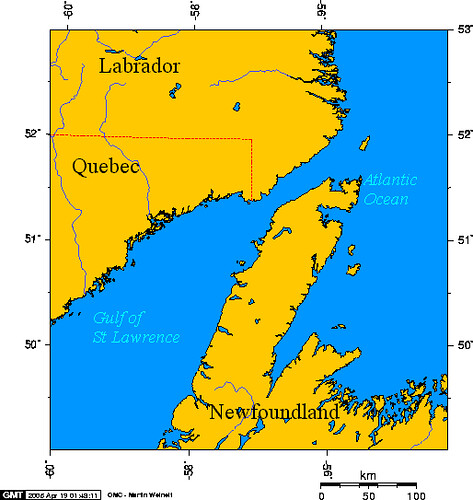
Map of Newfoundland and Labrador

The Texas Vampires were a name given to a group of researchers from Baylor College of Medicine who in 1998 conducted a study on arrhythmogenic right ventricular dysplasia (ARVD) among the population of Grand Falls-Windsor, Newfoundland and Labrador, Canada. The study team was led by Dr. Robert Roberts, who was president and CEO of the University of Ottawa Heart Institute from 2004 to 2014.

Because of the settlement pattern and isolation of the province's population, Newfoundland has clusters of certain genetic conditions, making it a focus of research in genetics. In 1998, one such cluster emerged in the community of Grand Falls-Windsor, where a number of people were found to have ARVD and some died of the condition. A group of researchers from the Baylor College of Medicine arrived in Newfoundland to study the community. The group collected blood samples, family histories and electrocardiographs (EKGs) from community members in order to test for a particular biomarker indicating a genetic predisposition to the condition.

== Ethical concerns ==
During the study, participants voiced concerns about the way it was conducted, suggesting that the informed consent process had been rushed or even skipped, or that potential participants had been made to feel they might die if they did not take part. They also objected to not being given the results of the study: "the Baylor Research team should know who is at risk of those people they tested, of having the condition and those who do not...That information has not been made available to the families". Moreover, the patient records acquired upon performing their tests with the help of local hospitals were never shared with the patients' respective healthcare providers; such abstention of relevant medical information further aggravated the situation by preventing patients from receiving accurate follow-up care. The retention of test results, such as echocardiograms and 12-lead electrocardiographs, not only resulted in the premature death or uncontrolled illness of some participants, but also opened the discussion on whether researchers should be compelled to report any results with medical relevance.

== Media coverage ==
Due to the ethical concerns and the speed at which the sampling took place – the team flew in, collected the blood samples, and then flew out again within days of arriving – the local people and the media began referring to the researchers as the Texas Vampires. The story became the topic of an extensive radio broadcast by the Canadian Broadcasting Corporation. A Baylor official responded that "There can also be different interpretations of what is being said both by the research team and other family members. In many cases the concerns arise due to communications falling short during the entire process." She added that although "current regulations do not demand the release of information...we are planning on providing all of the genetic information that we have". The team published an article in Circulation announcing the identification of a locus believed to be involved in ARVD. Members of the group later published another paper relating a different locus to the condition.

== Aftermath ==
The actions of the Texas Vampires and the public outcry regarding the incident led to the development of Newfoundland's Health Research Ethics Authority, a review board "to evaluate the ethics of all genetic studies proposed for the province". The board is the arbiter of which study groups are permitted to collect genetic materials from Newfoundlanders, among other considerations in medical ethics.
