= Steven A. Benner =

Former professor at Harvard University, ETH Zurich, and the University of Florida

Steven Albert Benner
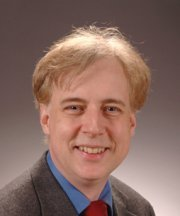
- Undated photo of Benner
- Born: October 23, 1954 (age 71)
- Education: Yale University (BS/MS); Harvard University (PhD)
- Known for: First synthesis of a gene that encoded a protein (an enzyme). In 1970, Har Gobind Khorana and his team at MIT were the first to chemically synthesize a gene from scratch.
- Scientific career
- Fields: Chemistry, synthetic biology
- Workplaces: Harvard University; ETH Zurich; University of Florida, Foundation for Applied Molecular Evolution, Westheimer Institute of Science and Technology
- Thesis: Absolute stereochemistry of acetoacetate decarboxylase, betaine-homocysteine transmethylase, and 3-hydroxybutyrate dehydrogenase.
- Doctoral advisor: Robert Burns Woodward, Frank Westheimer
- Website: www.ffame.org

Steven Albert Benner (born October 23, 1954) is an American chemist. He has been a professor at Harvard University, ETH Zurich, and most recently at the University of Florida, where he was the V.T. & Louise Jackson Distinguished Professor of Chemistry. In 2005, he founded The Westheimer Institute of Science and Technology (TWIST) and the Foundation For Applied Molecular Evolution. Benner has also founded the companies EraGen Biosciences and Firebird BioMolecular Sciences LLC.

Benner and his colleagues were the first to synthesize a gene that encoded a protein, beginning the field of synthetic biology. He was instrumental in establishing the field of paleogenetics. He is interested in the origin of life and the chemical conditions and processes needed to produce RNA. Benner has worked with NASA to develop detectors for alien genetic materials, using the definition of life developed by the NASA Exobiology Discipline Working Group in 1992, “a self-sustaining chemical system capable of Darwinian evolution”.

== Education ==
Benner attended Yale University, receiving his B.S./M.S. in molecular biophysics and biochemistry in 1976. He then went to Harvard University, receiving his Ph.D. in chemistry in 1979. He worked under the supervision of Robert Burns Woodward, completing his thesis work with Frank Westheimer after Woodward's death. His Ph.D. thesis was Absolute stereochemistry of acetoacetate decarboxylase, betaine-homocysteine transmethylase, and 3-hydroxybutyrate dehydrogenase.

== Career ==
After graduating from Harvard University, Benner became a fellow at Harvard, receiving the Dreyfus Award for Young Faculty in 1982. He was an assistant professor in the Department of Chemistry at Harvard University from 1982 to 1986.

In 1986, Benner moved to ETH Zurich, the Swiss Federal Institute of Technology in Zurich. He held the positions of associate professor of bio-organic chemistry from 1986 to 1993 and professor of bio-organic chemistry from 1993 to 1996.

By 1996 Benner joined the faculty at the University of Florida, as a professor in both chemistry and cell & molecular biology. He was appointed the V.T. & Louise Jackson Distinguished Professor of Chemistry at the University of Florida's Department of Chemistry in 2004.

Benner left University of Florida in late December 2005 to found The Westheimer Institute of Science and Technology (TWIST) in Honor of Frank Westheimer. It is part of the Foundation For Applied Molecular Evolution (FfAME) in Alachua, Florida, which Benner founded in 2001.

Benner founded EraGen Biosciences in 1999. The company was acquired by Luminex in 2011. He founded Firebird BioMolecular Sciences LLC in 2005.

== Research ==
Benner's research falls into four major areas:

1. expanding the genetic alphabet by synthesizing artificial structures
2. pre-biotic chemistry, the recreation of the chemical origin of life
3. paleogenetics, the study of ancient proteins from long-extinct species
4. detection of extraterrestrial life

The Benner laboratory is an originator of the field of "synthetic biology", which seeks to generate, by chemical synthesis, molecules that reproduce the complex behavior of living systems, including their genetics, inheritance, and evolution. Some high points of past work in chemical genetics are listed below.

=== Gene synthesis ===
In 1984, Benner's laboratory at Harvard was the first to report the chemical synthesis of a gene encoding an enzyme, following Khorana's synthesis of a shorter gene for tRNA in 1970. This was the first designed gene of any kind, a pioneering achievement that laid the groundwork for protein engineering. The design strategies introduced in this synthesis are now widely used to support protein engineering.

=== Artificial genetic systems ===
Efforts toward the goal of artificial genetic systems were first reported by Benner and coworkers in 1989, when they developed the first unnatural base pair. Benner and his colleagues have since developed a six-letter artificially expanded genetic information system called Artificially Expanded Genetic Information System (AEGIS) which includes two additional nonstandard nucleotides (Z and P) in addition to the four standard nucleotides (G, A, C, and T). AEGIS has its own supporting molecular biology. It enables the synthesis of proteins with more than the naturally-encoded 20 amino acids, and provides insight into how nucleic acids form duplex structures, how proteins interact with nucleic acids, and how alternative genetic systems might appear in non-terran life.

Benner is one of a number of researchers, including Eric T. Kool, Floyd E. Romesberg, Ichiro Hirao, Mitsuhiko Shionoya and Andrew Ellington, who have created an extended alphabet of synthetic bases that can be incorporated into DNA (as well as RNA) using Watson-Crick bonding (as well as non-Watson-Crick bonding). While most of these synthetic bases are derivatives of the A, C, G, T bases, some are different. While some are in Watson-Crick pairs (A/T, C/G), some are self complementing (X/X). Thus the genetic alphabet has been expanded.

The number of possible nucleotide triplets, or codons, available in protein synthesis depends on the number of nucleotides available. The standard alphabet (G, A, C, and T) yields 4^{3} = 64 possible codons, while an expanded DNA alphabet with 9 DNA bases would have 9^{3} = 729 possible codons, many of them synthetic codons. For these codons to be useful, Aminoacyl tRNA synthetase has been created such that tRNA can code for the possibly synthetic amino acid to be coupled with its corresponding synthetic anti-codon. Benner has described such a system which uses synthetic iso-C/iso-G DNA which uses the synthetic DNA codon [iso-C/A/G] which he calls the 65th codon. Synthetic mRNA with synthetic anti-codon [iso-G/U/C] with synthetic aminoacyl-tRNA synthetase results in an in vivo experiment that can code for a synthetic amino acid incorporated into synthetic polypeptides (synthetic proteomics).

=== A "second generation" model for nucleic acids ===
Benner has used synthetic organic chemistry and biophysics to create a "second generation" model for nucleic acid structure. The first generation model of DNA was proposed by James Watson and Francis Crick, based on crystallized X-ray structures being studied by Rosalind Franklin. According to the double-helix model, DNA is composed of two complementary strands of nucleotides coiled around each other. Benner's model emphasizes the role of the sugar and phosphate backbone in the genetic molecular recognition event. The poly-anionic backbone is important in creating the extended structure that helps DNA to replicate.

In 2004, Benner reported the first successful attempt to design an artificial DNA-like molecule capable of reproducing itself.

=== Genome sequencing and protein structure prediction ===
In the late 1980s, Benner recognized the potential for genome sequencing projects to generate millions of sequences and enable researchers to do extensive mapping of molecular structures in organic chemistry. In the early 1990s, Benner met Gaston Gonnet, beginning a collaboration that applied Gonnet's tools for text searching to the management of protein sequences. In 1990, in collaboration with Gaston Gonnet, the Benner laboratory introduced the DARWIN bioinformatics workbench. DARWIN (Data Analysis and Retrieval With Indexed Nucleic acid-peptide sequences) was a high-level programming environment for examining genomic sequences. It supported the matching of genomic sequences in databases, and generated information that showed how natural proteins could divergently evolve under functional constraints by accumulating mutations, insertions, and deletions. Building on Darwin, the Benner laboratory provided tools to predict the three dimensional structure of proteins from sequence data. Information about known protein structures was collected and marketed as a commercial database, the Master Catalog, by Benner's startup EraGen.

The use of multiple sequence information to predict secondary structure of proteins became popular as a result of the work of Benner and Gerloff. Predictions of protein secondary structure by Benner and colleagues achieved high accuracy. It became possible to model protein folds, detect distant homologs, enable structural genomics, and join protein sequence, structure, and function. Further, this work suggested limits to structure prediction by homology, defining what can and cannot be done with this strategy.

=== Practical genotyping tools ===
Benner's approach opened new perspectives on how nucleic acids work, as well as tools for diagnostics and nanotechnology. The FDA has approved products that use AEGIS DNA in human diagnostics. These monitor the loads of virus in patients infected with hepatitis B, hepatitis C and HIV. AEGIS has been the basis of the development of tools for multiplexed detection of genetic markers such as cancer cells and single nucleotide polymorphisms in patient samples. These tools will allow personalized medicine using "point-of-care" genetic analysis, as well as research tools that measure the level of individual mRNA molecules within single processes of single living neurons.

=== Interpretive proteomics ===
Interpreting genomic data and projecting back to a common genetic ancestor, "Luca", the Benner laboratory has introduced tools that analyze patterns of conservation and variation using structural biology, study variation in these patterns across different branches of an evolutionary tree, and correlate events in the genetic record with events in the history of the biosphere known from geology and fossils. From this have emerged examples showing how the roles of biomolecules in contemporary life can be understood through models of the historical past.

=== Experimental paleogenetics ===
Benner was an originator of the field of experimental paleogenetics, where genes and proteins from ancient organisms are resurrected using bioinformatics and recombinant DNA technology. Experimental work on ancient proteins has tested hypotheses about the evolution of complex biological functions, including the biochemistry of ruminant digestion, the thermophily of ancient bacteria, and the interaction between plants, fruits, and fungi at the time of the Cretaceous extinction. These develop our understanding of biological behavior that extends from the molecule to the cell to the organism, ecosystem, and planet, sometimes referred to as planetary biology.

=== Astrobiology ===
Benner is deeply interested in the origin of life, and the conditions necessary to support an RNA-world model in which self-replicating RNA is a precursor to life on Earth. He has identified calcium, borate, and molybdenum as important to the successful formation of carbohydrates and the stabilization of RNA. He suggested that the planet Mars may have had more desirable conditions than Earth for the initial production of RNA, but more recently agreed that models of early Earth showing dry land and intermittent water, developed by Stephen Mojzsis, present sufficient conditions for RNA development.

The Benner group has worked to identify molecular structures likely to be universal features of living systems regardless of their genesis, and not likely products of non-biological processes. These are "biosignatures", both for terrean-like life and for "weird" life forms.

One of these universal life identifiers was proposed in the Polyelectrolyte Theory of the Gene. This idea proposes that for a linear genetic biopolymer dissolved in water, such as DNA, to undergo Darwinian evolution anywhere in the universe, it must be a polyelectrolyte, a polymer containing repeating ionic charges. This concept was linked by Benner to the "aperiodic crystal" view of the gene as proposed by Erwin Schrödinger's book What Is Life? to make a robust universally generalizable view of genetic biomolecule. This idea has been suggested as a framework by which scientists may look for life on other solar bodies besides Earth.
