= Exploits Valley Salmon Festival =

Annual Canadian event

- Genre: Food festival
- Frequency: Annual
- Locations: Grand Falls-Windsor, Newfoundland and Labrador, Canada
- Years active: 1985 - 2016
- Website: http://www.evsalmonfestival.com/

The Exploits Valley Salmon Festival is an annual festival held in Grand Falls-Windsor of the Exploits Valley, Newfoundland and Labrador, Canada that dates back to 1985. Events that are part of the festival include a dance in a stadium and a dinner of salmon. There is also a concert, although the concert in 2007 was so poorly attended that the organizers lost $200,000 on it. The organizers continued to lose money on the festival in 2008, 2009, and 2010. Businessman Boyd Cohen was the patron of the 2009 festival. The main festival concert in 2010 featured Matthew Hornell and the Diamond Minds. There was also a gospel concert that was attended by hundreds of people. Kellie Loder, Starfield, and Reverend Roy Martin performed at this concert. In 2012, The Daily Telegraph named the festival one of the top ten attractions for British foodies vacationing in Canada. In 2011, The town signed a deal with concert promoters RFO. As a result, the festival experienced a resurgence attracting larger crowds, The shows were headlined by popular groups such as Kiss, Smash Mouth and Down with Webster in 2011, Aerosmith & Flo Rida in 2012, Eagles and The Tragically Hip in 2013, Maroon 5 in 2014 and John Fogerty, Tom Cochrane, America and The Fables (making their first public performance in 12 years) in 2015.

The 2013 concert headlined by Eagles was panned by critics for the poor planning. The temperature rose to approximately 30 degrees Celsius, and many concert goers complained in regards to lack of available water as patrons were not permitted to bring their own, and concession stands reportedly ran out of water twice. According to reports, more than 100 people were treated for dehydration. VIP ticket holders complained too many tickets were sold for the private section on the field, and made the concert unenjoyable. Such complainants had told media outlets they were considering a class action lawsuit, but it never materialized.

The 2014 concert achieved controversy during the planning stages. The town frequently delayed making an official announcement in regards to who would headline the show. Mayor Al Hawkins appeared on local radio commenting that the date would not be changed from a planned July 9 date. But despite this only a week later the concert was officially announced to take place on July 16 and would be headlined by Maroon 5. Many complained about the date change and were unimpressed with the lineup, expecting a more "legendary" act as in the past three years and cited a lack of variety of types of music. As a result attendance was only 8,500 (less than 1/3 of the previous year) and the town reported a near $500,000 loss. The town denied any belief the date change led to a low turnout instead blaming it on the media backlash from the previous year.

In 2015, The town opted to buy out of their contract with RFO in response to the previous year's disappointment. The Salmon Festival success was threatened however, when Mighty Quinton Promotions announced the date of the Confederation Hill Music concert headlined by Rod Stewart would take place in St John’s on the same date as the Salmon Festival concert. The town attempted to compete by announcing the Salmon Festival would be headlined by John Fogerty and would feature Tom Cochrane, America and The Fables. Moreover, organizers allowed patrons to leave the grounds and return later (via a bracelet system) until 7:00pm. Despite rave reviews, the concert was attended by only 5,500 people and a $667,000 loss. Later, reports revealed promoters had advised the town to cancel the concert beforehand due to early tickets sales being poor, however, the decision to go ahead was narrowly passed by town council. Reports also stated John Fogerty had been paid $655,000 to perform at the show, while Tom Cochrane and The Fables were paid $52,000 and $10,000, respectively.

The over $1 million in losses collectively over the previous 2 years lead to questions over the future of the yearly event. However, council announced the 2016 concert would go ahead but that it would be the end of the "mega concert". They would later announce a lineup consisting of headliner Trooper as well as The Stampeders and Newfoundland favorite Buddy Wasisname and the Other Fellers, with the rest of the lineup consisting of local bands.
