= CHEV =

CHEV may refer to:

- CHEV (AM), Toronto, Ontario, Canada
- CHEV-FM, Grand Falls-Windsor, Newfoundland and Labrador, Canada
- Charge-maintaining hybrid electric vehicle

== See also ==
- Chevrolet, or Chev, an American automobile marque
