= The Badger Drive =

The Badger Drive (Roud 4542) is a traditional Newfoundland folk song/ballad. The song is about a lumber drive near Badger, Newfoundland. As with many Newfoundland ballads, the lyrics are about places and events and sometimes actual individuals, this song having all of those qualities. It was composed in 1912 by John V. Devine of King's Cove, Bonavista Bay, NL. Local and family tradition hold that Devine composed it in a Grand Falls boarding house after having been fired from his job as scaler for the Anglo Newfoundland Development Company (A.N.D.). He sang the song at a St. Patrick's Day concert at which company officials were present and allegedly won his job back. Note: Reference 1 has erroneously transcribed the phrase "caulks on their boots" as "cocks in their boots". Additional history and photos related to the Badger Drive and other log drives near Grand Falls, NL are available online in The "Badger Drive" Examined, by Bryan Marsh.

== See also ==
- List of Newfoundland songs
