= CHEV-FM =

Community radio station in Newfoundland and Labrador, Canada

- Grand Falls-Windsor, Newfoundland and Labrador; Canada
- Broadcast area: Exploits Valley
- Frequency: 94.5 MHz
- Branding: Valley Radio

Programming
- Format: Community radio

Ownership
- Owner: Exploits Valley Community Radio Inc.

History
- Founded: 2017 (as an internet station)
- First air date: November 2020
- Call sign meaning: Exploits Valley

Technical information
- ERP: 35 watts
- HAAT: 73 metres

Links
- Website: valleygfw.ca

CHEV-FM is a community radio station that operates on 94.5 MHz in Grand Falls-Windsor, Newfoundland and Labrador, Canada. The station is branded as Valley Radio.

== History ==
The station originally began as an internet radio station in 2017 as a project to bring local voices back to the Grand Falls-Windsor area, after the CBC and VOCM closed the stations in the community.

On July 29, 2019, Exploits Valley Community Radio Inc. (EVCR) received approval from the Canadian Radio-television and Telecommunications Commission (CRTC) to operate a low-power, English-language community FM radio station at 94.5 MHz in Grand Falls-Windsor, Newfoundland and Labrador.

In November 2020, CHEV-FM signed on the air as Valley Radio.
