= Andrew D. Ellington =

American biochemist and synthetic biologist

- Born: 1959 (age 66–67); Missouri, U.S.
- Education: Michigan State University (B.S., 1981); Harvard University (Ph.D., 1988)
- Scientific career
- Fields: Biochemistry, Synthetic biology
- Workplaces: University of Texas at Austin; Indiana University Bloomington
- Doctoral advisor: Stephen C. Harrison

Andrew D. Ellington (born 1959) is an American biochemist and synthetic biologist who is a professor at the University of Texas at Austin. He holds the Wilson M. and Kathryn Fraser Professorship in Biochemistry at UT Austin and was selected as a Howard Hughes Medical Institute (HHMI) Professor in 2017. Ellington is best known for his work on in vitro selection techniques and is credited with coining the term "aptamer" to describe nucleic acid molecules that bind specific targets. His laboratory's research spans directed evolution, nucleic acid engineering, and synthetic biology, including the development of aptamers, ribozymes, and diagnostic biosensors.

== Early life and education ==
Ellington was born in 1959 in Missouri. He developed an early interest in science and went on to attend Michigan State University, where he earned a B.S. in biochemistry in 1981. He then pursued graduate studies at Harvard University, receiving his Ph.D. in biochemistry and molecular biology in 1988. During his Ph.D., he worked with chemist Steven A. Benner on theories of molecular evolution. Following graduate school, Ellington carried out postdoctoral research in Szostak's lab at Massachusetts General Hospital/Harvard Medical School, where he performed the experiments that led to the discovery of aptamers via in vitro selection techniques.

== Career ==
In 1992, Ellington began his independent academic career as a faculty member in the Department of Chemistry at Indiana University Bloomington, where he continued to develop methods for the selection of functional nucleic acids. He moved to the University of Texas at Austin in 1998 as an associate professor of chemistry and biochemistry. At UT Austin, he was later promoted to full professor and named the Fraser Professor of Biochemistry. He also became a founding member of the university's Center for Systems and Synthetic Biology. In 2017, Ellington was one of fourteen scientists nationwide selected by HHMI to receive an HHMI Professors award aimed at improving undergraduate science education.

Beyond his academic roles, Ellington has been active in translating his research into practice. He has co-founded biotechnology companies, including Archemix and B^{3} Biosciences, to commercialize aptamer technologies and other applications of synthetic biology. He has also collaborated with industry and defense agencies; for example, he worked with an Austin-based startup, Paratus Diagnostics, to develop portable diagnostic devices for detecting diseases from saliva or urine samples.

== Research and contributions ==
Ellington's research integrates directed evolution and synthetic biology to engineer functional biopolymers and organisms. Early in his career, working with Jack Szostak, he pioneered methods to evolve RNA molecules that bind specific ligands from random sequences. In a significant 1990 paper, Ellington and Szostak demonstrated the in vitro selection of RNA aptamers (a term they introduced) that could specifically bind to organic dyes.

Building on aptamer technology, Ellington's laboratory has also developed allosteric ribozymes (aptazymes) that act as molecular switches, offering potential applications in genetic circuitry and biosensing. His work has extended to evolving enzymes with enhanced stability and novel functions and engineering microorganisms with expanded genetic codes (e.g., "unColi"), paving the way for the production of proteins with novel properties.

An application of Ellington's research is in the development of point-of-care diagnostic devices. His lab has created low-cost, paper-based diagnostic tests for infectious diseases such as Ebola and multidrug-resistant tuberculosis, employing engineered nucleic acid circuits that generate a visible color change upon target detection.

Throughout his career, Ellington has published over 200 research articles and holds numerous patents related to aptamer selection methods, biosensors, and synthetic biology technologies.

== Awards and honors ==
- Office of Naval Research Young Investigator Award – Recognized early in his career for his contributions to nucleic acid biochemistry and synthetic biology.
- Pew Scholars Program in the Biomedical Sciences – Named a Pew Scholar in 1994, acknowledging his potential in biomedical research.
- Cottrell Scholar Award – Awarded for excellence in research and teaching in chemistry.
- American Foundation for AIDS Research Scholar Award – Recognized for contributions to HIV/AIDS-related research.
- National Security Science and Engineering Faculty Fellowship – Awarded in 2010 by the U.S. Department of Defense for innovative research in synthetic biology.
- Fellow of the American Association for the Advancement of Science (AAAS) – Elected in 2012 for his innovative contributions to aptamer and synthetic biology research.
- Fellow of the American Academy of Microbiology – Elected in 2014, in recognition of his excellence in microbiological sciences.
- Howard Hughes Medical Institute Professor – Selected as an HHMI Professor in 2017, in recognition of both his research achievements and his contributions to undergraduate science education.
