= Exploits Valley =

Valley in Newfoundland and Labrador, Canada

Coordinates: 48.938°N 55.875°W

The Exploits Valley is a valley in the province of Newfoundland and Labrador in the central part of the island of Newfoundland.

== Natural environment ==
Formed by glaciation, the Exploits River flows eastward through the valley, framed by low hills from the high plateau in the centre of the island. The lower part of the valley hosts a dense, primarily evergreen, forest and large mammals such as woodland caribou, moose and black bears, as well as habitat for smaller animals and birds.

== Human settlement ==
Human settlement came to the area several thousand years ago when the Beothuk Nation inhabited the region, living in fishing camps on the banks of the river during the summer and maintaining winter hunting camps at the upper end of the valley at Beothuk Lake. The river was used as a travel corridor as they spent summers fishing near the river's discharge point in the Bay of Exploits.

European settlement came first to coastal regions in the Bay of Exploits and Notre Dame Bay area, notably the fishing town of Twillingate, which is located on two neighbouring islands at the eastern edge of Notre Dame Bay. Its sheltered harbour and strategic position made it an important fishing haven for more than 200 years until the fishing of northern cod was banned in 1992. During the 18th century, it became known as the "Capital of the North" acting as the centre of trade for Labrador fisheries.

The Newfoundland Railway was constructed across the river at Bishop's Falls during the early 1890s, marking the beginning of industrial development in the valley.

The river was dammed for hydroelectric generation at historic waterfalls in Grand Falls and Bishop's Falls. This electricity powered local communities and a large pulp and paper mill in Grand Falls during the early 20th century.

The river becomes navigable below Bishop's Falls and the pulp and paper mill constructed a seaport on the lower reaches of the river at Botwood, which was connected to Grand Falls by an industrial railway.

An important ore deposit was discovered in the upper reaches of the Exploits Valley at the town of Buchans, resulting in sizable mines and another industrial railway line linking with the Newfoundland Railway west of Grand Falls.

During the mid-1960s the Trans-Canada Highway project constructed Route 1 through the lower part of the valley between Bishop's Falls and Badger.

A disastrous flood on the Exploits River in February 2003 caused by icejams forced the evacuation of the town of Badger.
