= Point-of-care genetic testing =

Point-of-care genetic testing identifies variations in the genetic sequence at the bedside – enabling clinicians to react and alter therapy based upon the results.

Traditional genetic testing involves the analysis of DNA in order to detect genotypes related to a heritable disease or phenotype of interest for clinical purposes. However, current testing methods require days to weeks before results are available limiting the clinical applicability of genetic testing in a number of circumstances.

Recently, the first point-of-care genetic test in medicine was demonstrated to be effective in identifying CYP2C19*2 carriers allowing tailoring of anti-platelet regimens to reduce high on treatment platelet reactivity. In the RAPID GENE study, Drs. Jason Roberts and Derek So from the University of Ottawa Heart Institute validated a pharmacogenomics approach in patients undergoing percutaneous coronary intervention for acute coronary syndrome or stable coronary artery disease. This study is the first in medicine to incorporate point-of-care testing with genetics into routine clinical care and decision making.
