= Badger, Newfoundland and Labrador =

Badger
- Town
- Location of Badger in Newfoundland
- Coordinates: 48°58′00″N 56°02′00″W
- Country: Canada
- Province: Newfoundland and Labrador
- Census division: 6
- Incorporated: 1963

Government
  - Mayor: Dennis Butt
  - MHA: Chris Tibbs (PC)
  - MP: Clifford Small (CPC)

Area
  - Land: 1.96 km^{2} (0.76 sq mi)

Population (2021)
  - Total: 682
- Time zone: UTC– 3:30 (Newfoundland Time)
  - Summer (DST): UTC– 2:30 (Newfoundland Daylight)
- Area code: 709
- Highways: Route 1 (TCH); Route 370

Badger is a town in north-central Newfoundland, Newfoundland and Labrador, Canada on the Exploits River. It supplied pulpwood (timber) for the mills in Grand Falls for many years and was famous for its large spring log drives. The town is located in the interior of the island, twenty miles west of Grand Falls in Division No. 6. Badger was incorporated as a Town on September 30, 1963.

== Demographics ==
In the 2021 Census of Population conducted by Statistics Canada, Badger had a population of 682 living in 313 of its 357 total private dwellings, a change of −3.1% from its 2016 population of 704. With a land area of 1.89 km^{2} (0.73 sq mi), it had a population density of 360.8/km^{2} (934.6/sq mi) in 2021.

== History ==
=== Early history ===
The name of the town was taken from Badger Brook, which flows through the town and is a tributary of the Exploits River. The Brook was initially thought to flow into Badger Bay, and was named Badger Bay Brook. It was later shortened to Badger Brook. (It does not flow into Badger Bay.)

The history of human settlement in what is now Badger can be traced back to the Beothuck, who are known to have lived where Badger Brook flows into the Exploits River. There are remains of Beothuck sites known in the area. A strategically important point with regards to transportation by water, the Mi'kmaq are also known to have used this area as a camp site when traveling to the Exploits River and on to Halls Bay.

=== Logging and lumbering ===
The Mi'kmaq family names most closely associated with Badger are Paul and Barrington, and it is a John Paul that is thought to be the first permanent resident of the town. John Paul and John Barrington are known to have trapped in current Badger area. John Barrington also served as a guide in the 1875 survey for the Newfoundland railway. The area was all wilderness until about 1894, when the Newfoundland Railway went through. Soon after, the first railway workers settled there. Around that same time, lumbering operations commenced and was initially a source of logs for the Exploit Lumber Company, who had a sawmill at Botwood and owned the timber limits. The same company established a mill at Badger sometime around the turn of the century. According to the Encyclopedia of Newfoundland and Labrador, there were two mills in the area in 1901. A company known as the Newfoundland Pinelands Company owned a mill at Badger in 1905. Pinelands was a Harvey and Company subsidiary. The lumbering operations in Badger were taken over in the period 1905–1909 by Harry Judson Crowe, who would later sell the timber limits to the A.E. Reed (Newfoundland) company as a source of wood for their Bishop's Falls pulp mill.

In 1911, the Reed company began a series of sales of timber rights with the Anglo-Newfoundland Development Company ("A.N.D.") which led to the latter's acquisition of most of the timber limits in the area. In 1910–1911 A.N.D. established Badger Woods Division to facilitate logging operations. From that point until 1965 the A.N.D. Co would be the most important force in the local economy. In 1911 AND Co built warehouses, repair shops, blacksmiths forges and a cable scow to facilitate the movement of men, horses and supplies across the Exploits River.

== Climate ==
Climate data for Badger, 1991–2020 normals, extremes 1956–present
Month	Jan	Feb	Mar	Apr	May	Jun	Jul	Aug	Sep	Oct	Nov	Dec	Year
Record high humidex	17.6	12.9	20.9	21.0	32.8	38.6	40.9	40.4	41.0	31.7	22.4	17.1	41.0
Record high °C (°F)	14.9 (58.8)	13.2 (55.8)	20.9 (69.6)	20.9 (69.6)	31.8 (89.2)	33.2 (91.8)	34.5 (94.1)	36.7 (98.1)	34.0 (93.2)	26.0 (78.8)	19.4 (66.9)	14.3 (57.7)	36.7 (98.1)
Mean daily maximum °C (°F)	−2.2 (28.0)	−2.0 (28.4)	1.2 (34.2)	6.7 (44.1)	13.1 (55.6)	18.8 (65.8)	24.1 (75.4)	23.1 (73.6)	18.2 (64.8)	11.6 (52.9)	5.6 (42.1)	0.7 (33.3)	9.9 (49.8)
Daily mean °C (°F)	−8.0 (17.6)	−8.5 (16.7)	−5.2 (22.6)	1.2 (34.2)	6.7 (44.1)	11.9 (53.4)	16.9 (62.4)	16.0 (60.8)	11.2 (52.2)	6.0 (42.8)	1.1 (34.0)	−3.6 (25.5)	3.8 (38.8)
Mean daily minimum °C (°F)	−13.9 (7.0)	−15.0 (5.0)	−11.6 (11.1)	−4.5 (23.9)	0.0 (32.0)	5.0 (41.0)	9.7 (49.5)	8.9 (48.0)	4.2 (39.6)	0.4 (32.7)	−3.4 (25.9)	−7.9 (17.8)	−2.3 (27.9)
Record low °C (°F)	−36.1 (−33.0)	−45.0 (−49.0)	−40.0 (−40.0)	−27.2 (−17.0)	−10.2 (13.6)	−6.2 (20.8)	−1.6 (29.1)	−1.9 (28.6)	−5.1 (22.8)	−10.4 (13.3)	−23.8 (−10.8)	−31.5 (−24.7)	−45.0 (−49.0)
Record low wind chill	−39.6	−46.1	−41.7	−31.4	−13.9	−6.9	−5.7	−3.2	−10.0	−14.9	−29.0	−37.8	−46.1
Source: Environment Canada

== The Anglo-Newfoundland Development Company and the "Badger Drive" ==
Perhaps Badger's most important role in logging was that it was from there that the "Badger Drive" was conducted. This log drive took place on the Exploits River between Badger and Grand Falls and was carried on between 1908–1991. It was famously described by John Valentine Devine in his song The Badger Drive. Most all of the pulpwood from Millertown and Badger divisions west of Badger had to pass through the area. To facilitate this, hundreds of men were employed keeping the logs flowing down the river.

During the 1920s, a tractor repair garage was also built by A.N.D. Co. in the town to repair its tractors. This garage later involved the Newfoundland Tractor and Equipment Company, who preferred to do all the maintenance for A.N.D. Co. With the building of the road to Halls Bay, Badger became a railhead for the communities in the Springdale and Green Bay areas.

For many years Badger, was essentially a company town, with most services provided by the Anglo-Newfoundland Development Company. Under this company, the town was the responsibility of a man by the name of Hugh Wilding Cole. Cole was an Englishman who came to work for A.N.D. Co in 1905. As superintendent of the Badger Division, Cole was known as the "Mayor of Badger."

As logging was the mainstay of the area, Badger received national attention during the 1959 Newfoundland International Woodworkers of America (IWA) Strike. The Strike culminated in March 1959 with a riot in the town in which one policeman was killed and dozens of loggers injured.

=== Recent history ===
When a bridge was built over the Exploits River at Grand Falls in the early 1960s, Badger's importance as the gateway into the lumber woods was greatly diminished. In 1965 it ceased to be a woods division. Despite this, logging remained important to the community for many years. Some people found employment in mining at the nearby Buchans and Gullbridge mines, though these would later close. The closure of these mines combined with the closure of the Newfoundland Railway in 1988 took much importance away from the town. Today many residents, as well as students, commute to Grand Falls-Windsor for work and school. As of late, important players in the town economy include several gas stations and restaurants, a heavy equipment training school and a metal fabrication establishment.

Long plagued by flooding, Badger was inundated by a catastrophic flood on Saturday, February 15, 2003 when the Exploits River, Red Indian River, and Badger River were backed up with ice jams, causing water levels to rise 2.5 meters overflowing their banks and flooding the town under several feet of water and ice. The town was forced to evacuate and many found lodging in nearby Grand Falls-Windsor.

In 2008, a novel by J. A. Ricketts, The Badger Riot, was written depicting the events of the IWA Strike in 1959. The book would become the bestselling book in Atlantic Canada for that year.

Portions of Badger were subjected to an evacuation order in late January, 2026 following potential flooding caused by increased water levels in the Exploits, Badger, and Red Indian rivers, which the town sits on. The evacuation orders were lifted on February 4th 2026 after water levels receded.

== Notable residents ==
- Kellie Loder, musician
- Chuck Lewis, musician
- Michelle Critch, World Karate Champion

== Sources ==
Joseph Smallwood ed. Cole, Hugh Henry Wilding'' The Encyclopedia of Newfoundland and Labrador (St. John's: Newfoundland Book Publishers, 1984),

Joseph Smallwood ed. Badger The Encyclopedia of Newfoundland and Labrador (St. John's: Newfoundland Book Publishers, 1984),

	North: Division No. 6, Subd. C
West: Division No. 6, Subd. C	Badger	East: Division No. 6, Subd. C
	South: Division No. 6, Subd. C

== See also ==
- List of cities and towns in Newfoundland and Labrador
