= Buchans =

- Town
- Location of Buchans in Newfoundland
- Coordinates: 48°49′30″N 56°51′30″W
- Country: Canada
- Province: Newfoundland and Labrador
- Census division: 6
- Incorporated: 1979

Government
  - Mayor: Brian Fowlow

Area
  - Land: 4.88 km^{2} (1.88 sq mi)

Population (2021)
  - Total: 590
  - Density: 131.5/km^{2} (341/sq mi)
- Time zone: UTC-3:30 (Newfoundland Time)
  - Summer (DST): UTC-2:30 (Newfoundland Daylight)
- Area code: 709
- Highways: Route 370

Buchans (/ˈbʌkənz/ BUK-ənz) is a town located in the central part of the island of Newfoundland in the province of Newfoundland and Labrador. It is situated on the northwest shore of Beothuk Lake on the Buchans River.

The town is located within the statistical unit of Census Division No. 6, approximately 72 kilometres southwest of the Trans-Canada Highway at the terminus of Route 370.

== Demographics ==
In the 2021 Census of Population conducted by Statistics Canada, Buchans had a population of 590 living in 304 of its 338 total private dwellings, a change of −8.1% from its 2016 population of 642. With a land area of 4.63 km^{2} (1.79 sq mi), it had a population density of 127.4/km^{2} (330.0/sq mi) in 2021.

== Discovery and mining history ==
In 1905, the Anglo-Newfoundland Development Company (AND) was granted mineral rights to 2,320 sq mi (6,000 km^{2}) of central Newfoundland for 99 years; any commercial mining would result in payment of a 5% royalty to the Dominion of Newfoundland.

Matty Mitchell, a prospector and guide of Mi'kmaq and Montagnais ancestry employed by AND, is credited with the original discovery of zinc-lead-copper ore on the banks of the Buchans River. Most accounts state that he made his discovery early in the summer of 1905. Unfortunately, no milling process at the time could adequately separate the complex mixture of copper, lead and zinc sulphides. AND Company did try to mine this site seasonally from 1906 until 1911.

In 1916, the American Smelting and Refining Company (Asarco) learned of the Buchans River ore deposit and obtained samples for metallurgical testing. It wasn't until 1925 that a suitable method for separating the various metals in Buchans ore was finally perfected by Asarco.

Asarco leased the mining rights to the Buchans River Mine; In return, the AND Company would receive 50 per cent of the profits from the mine's development. In the spring of 1926, Asarco began prospecting for additional orebodies on the lease land, led by Asarco engineer J.Ward Williams and Swedish Geophysicist Hans Lundberg. This prospecting led to the discoveries that would ensure a long and prosperous mining operation at Buchans and the construction of a permanent company town.

=== Buchans mines ===
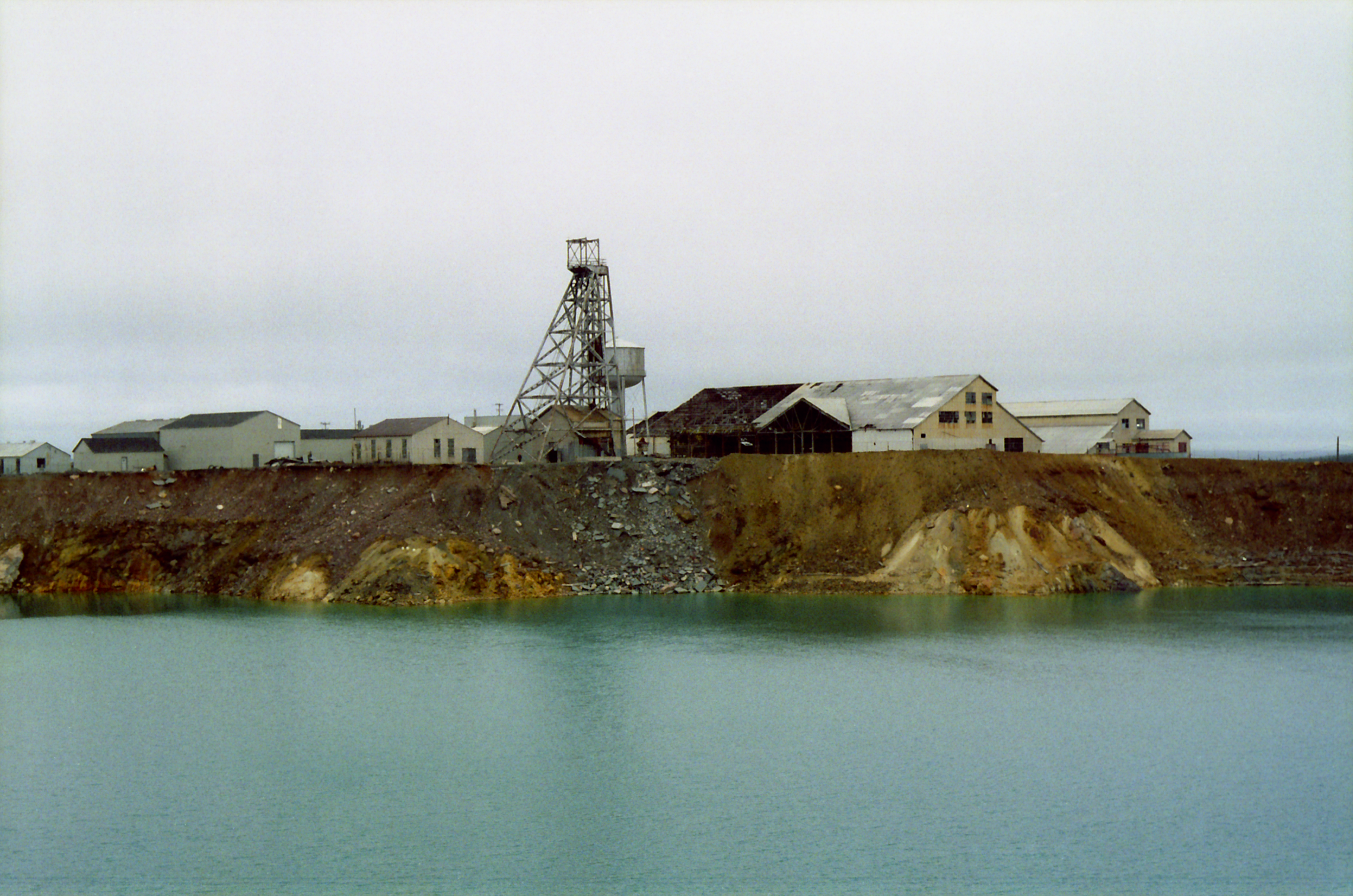
Buchans Mines

Old Buchans

The original 1905 Buchans discovery made by Matty Mitchell was only the first in a series of discoveries that would lead to 57 years of continuous mining later during the life of the town. "Old Buchans" as that mine was called, only produced a small percentage of the ore at Buchans - 217,135 tons. It was mined from 1943 to 1956 [Asarco accessed this orebody not through the original 1906-1911 shaft but connected to the mine primarily via 1 level in Oriental] and again in 1977 and 1978 [1977-78 - open pit/surface]. Besides Old Buchans, four major mines operated at different times between 1927 and 1984 - Lucky Strike Mine, Oriental, Rothermere, and MacLeans.

==== Lucky Strike ====
Lucky Strike orebody, named because it was discovered after a chance change of plans in exploration, was discovered on July 14, 1926. This mine, with its iconic 100 ft headframe overlooking the town; would produce ore from 1928 to 1958 and again from 1972 to 1979. In that time, 6,253,660 tons of ore were produced at Lucky Strike. As with all underground mines at Buchans, its nowmal underground "levels" were approximately 200 ft apart from one another and included elaborate workings for an office, explosives magazine, lunch room, and other functional areas. Lucky strike mine shaft extends 714 ft underground.

==== Oriental ====
Oriental orebody, named due to its location east of Buchans River, was discovered on August 7, 1926. It would go on to produce ore as an underground mine from 1935 to 1969 and again briefly from surface/pit sources from 1980 to 1981 and from 1983 to 1984. 3,372,224 Tons of ore were produced over the life of Oriental mine.

==== Rothermere ====
Rothermere was discovered near the end of 1947. It was named after Lord Rothermere, whose family founded the AND company. The Rothermere mine shaft was 2,505 feet (764 m) deep. The mine operated from 1950 to 1978. It produced a total of 3,508,226 tons of ore.

==== MacLean's ====
The deepest orebody mined at Buchans was MacLeans. It was named after Dr. Hugh J. MacLean, Asarco's chief geologist in Buchans from 1941 until his tragic death in a bush plane crash at South Pond in 1951. MacLeans was discovered in 1950. MacLeans mine shaft was completed at a depth of 3,526 feet below surface [though the mine is actually deeper than this due to the mining of MacLean's extension in 1983 and 1984 through a "winze" (diagonal decline) tunnel leading to "21 level."] The mine produced ore from 1959 to 1981 and from 1983 to 1984. MacLeans produced a total of 3,514,989 tons of ore.

==== Labour disputes ====
There were four official strikes in the history of Buchans mining operation. The first was in 1941 and lasted 15 days. The second, involving just miners, happened in 1955 and lasted 36 days. The third strike lasted from June 12 to November 12, 1971. The fourth, final and longest strike lasted from March 15 to October 2, 1973.

==== Mine fatalities ====
Between 1927 and 1984, the years of Asarco mining at Buchans, a total of twenty-three men lost their lives in accidents. The majority of these deaths occurred in the earlier years of the operations.

== Transportation links ==
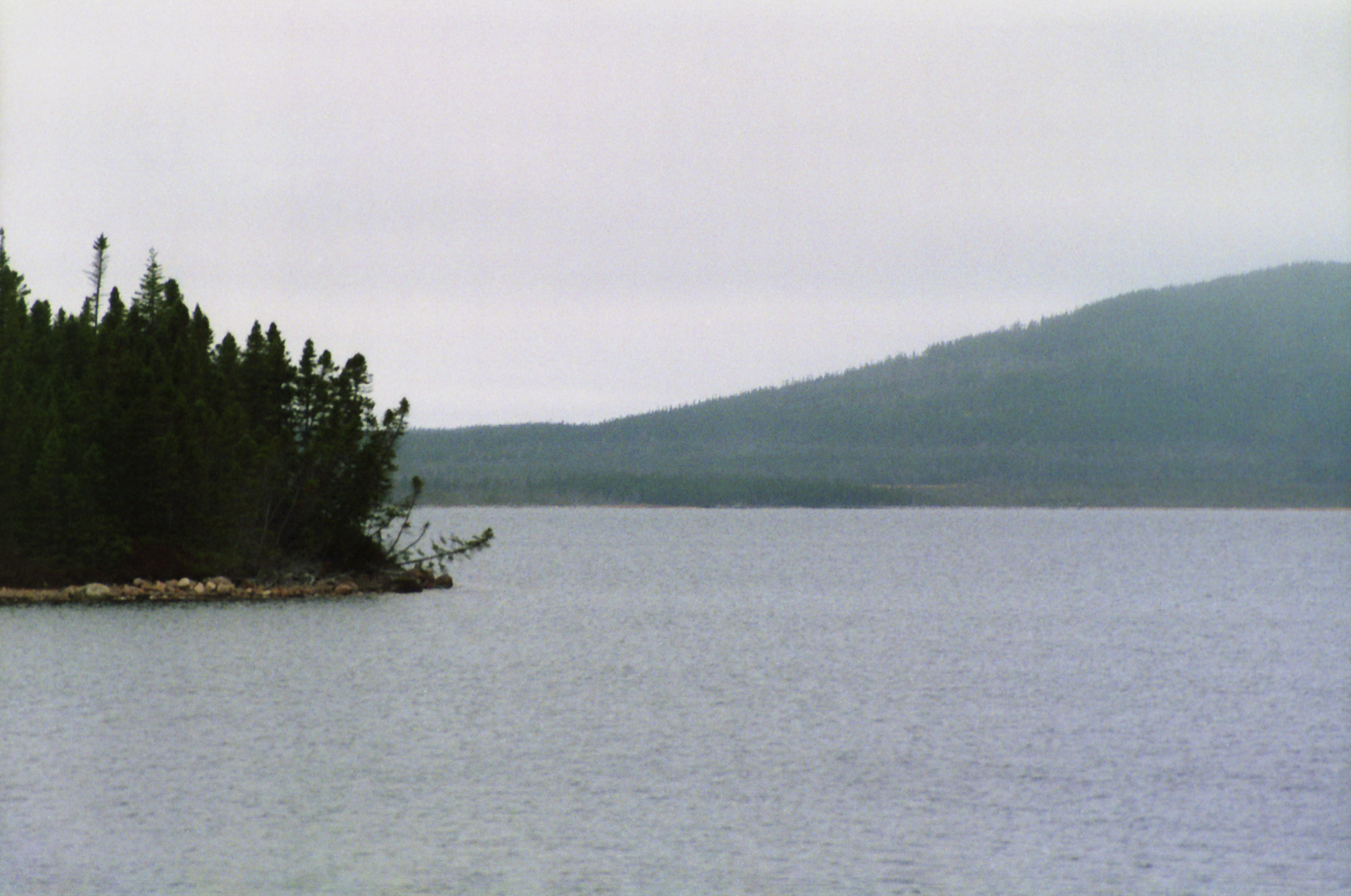
Buchans Lake

Initial years

AND co purchased the Millertown Railway in 1910, which had been constructed in 1900 and linked to the Newfoundland Railway at Millertown Junction. Almost all travel to the Buchans River site prior to the fall of 1927 was by rail to Millertown on the Millertown railway then by boat to Buchans Landing on the north shore of Red Indian Lake, then by foot or mechanized vehicle over a rough corduroy road to Buchans. Prospectors and other early visitors probably walked/portaged along Buchans River from its mouth.

=== Railway and highway ===
In the fall of 1927, the Buchans Railway connected the town to the outside world. This railway joined the Milltertown Railway at Four Mile Siding, near Mary March Brook, which would become the community of Buchans Junction. All concentrate was shipped by train to the port of Botwood until the railway closed in 1977. A route for a highway to Buchans was surveyed in 1948. The highway itself was completed and opened in 1956. In the final years of the Asarco operation (1977–1984), Buchans concentrate was trucked to Botwood by Cook's Transport Ltd. From the port of Botwood the ore would be sent to smelters all over the world. The Buchans railway bed remains a popular trail for ATVs and snowmobiles.

=== Air ===
An airstrip was constructed east of Buchans Lake in 1942. Buchans Airport was constructed initially by the Canadian Department of Transport with the permission of the government of the Dominion of Newfoundland for use by the Canadian Department of National Defence. Large bombers frequently used the airstrip during World War II. Its two gravel runways were maintained by a small resident staff until 1965. At that time, most of the buildings and equipment at the site were removed; the three houses for airstrip staff were relocated to Buchans. Eastern Provincial Airways also briefly included Buchans as a stop/destination on one of its routes—this occurred in the summer of 1956. While the northwest runway was rarely used even between 1942 and 1965 (drainage issues with the site), and fell into complete disrepair at the end of that period, the southwest–northeast runway has been repaired from time to time for use in more recent decades.

Asarco also made use of Buchans Lake as a base for various float-planes over the years. These planes were used for transportation and to supply mineral exploration camps in the region. In later years, road access and helicopters were preferred for such work. A hangar was constructed near the Buchans dam. Among the bush planes based there between the 1950s and 1970s were the de Havilland Otter and later the de Havilland Beaver. The hangar was demolished in the early 1990s.

=== Major secondary access roads ===
In the 1960s, a road was extended from the Buchans Highway (at a point near Buchans River) to provide access to resources located near the north shores of Red Indian Lake. Known locally as the "New Road", this road initially extended as far as Star River. Its extension, improvement and the addition of new bridges led to its connection to the Burgeo Highway (Route 480). Several studies have explored and recommended the upgrade of this route to have a provincial class highway connecting routes 480 and 370. These studies include reports of the Government of Newfoundland's Buchans Task Force in 1976 and the Buchans Action Committee in the early 1980s. The "New Road" as it stands has provided access for pulpwood cutting, tourism, fishing, hunting, aquaculture, silviculture, mineral exploration, as well as access to the Star Lake Hydroelectric Development. When passable, it still provides access for local residents and visitors to the Lloyd's Valley and Southwest Brook areas.

The construction of the Hinds Lake hydroelectric project in 1980 led to the extension of a gravel road north from the Buchans Airstrip to Hinds Dike at the southernmost end of Hinds Lake. Forest access roads extending from near the community of Howley are now only a few miles from this road. This general route has been considered for a possible upgrade to allow for a provincial class highway connection between routes 401 and 370. While the Buchans to Hinds Lake road is less passable, these access roads are used by hunters, outfitters, snowmobilers, ATV users and other outdoors enthusiasts.

== Early history ==
=== Company town ===
Most of the employees working on the development of the mine, construction of the town, and construction of the railway were housed in temporary camps. The first worker's home in Buchans was completed on March 13, 1927; twenty-six homes were completed by the end of that year. By the time of first concentrate production in September 1928, there were 56 housing units, an apartment house, a staff house, hospital, a town hall, and several bunkhouses in the town. Several businesses including a retail store, a laundromat and a barber shop had also been established. Both the company and the Roman Catholic Church opened schools in the town. In 1929, the company constructed tennis courts, a ski run, an athletic field, and, in winter months, converted one of its concentrate sheds into a skating rink. Buchans had running water, sewage, electricity, and other services in place by 1928. The town would grow in size and prosper throughout the next few decades. From 1927 until the late 1970s, most town services and infrastructure were administered directly by the company. Company support, subsidization and direction also continued during that time for most of the town's major recreational services.

=== Municipal history ===
After the Buchans highway was opened in 1956, several families who wished to own their own houses independent of the company-administered town settled on the banks of the Buchans River at the point where the highway crossed it, in a settlement known as "Pigeon Inlet." This settlement was named after the fictional community of "Pigeon Inlet" created by Newfoundland writer Ted Russell. In 1963 these houses were re-located to a subdivision on the southeast corner of town. The subdivision, which became known as "Townsite" became the Local Improvement District of Buchans. Residents of "Townsite" owned their own homes and managed municipal affairs independently of Asarco. On October 1, 1978, the company town became a separate local improvement district. The two municipal governments merged to form the first democratically elected municipal government for the entire town on June 18, 1979.

=== Hockey ===
Hockey, including school hockey and town and plant internal leagues had been a major recreational activity in Buchans going back to the 1930s. Games were played on nearby ponds, and eventually of the two large Asarco ore sheds on the north side of the town was converted each season into a skating/hockey rink.

Buchans was among the towns on the island to compete for the Herder Memorial Trophy, fielding senior teams from the 1930s through to 1969. The Buchans Miners senior hockey team won the Herder in 1950, 1951, 1952, 1954, and 1963. A Buchans team of one name or another also was runner-up for the trophy in 1937, 1940, 1948, 1953, 1955, 1956, 1964, 1968 and 1969. In addition to exceptional local talent, the Buchans Miners hockey dynasty attracted marquis "import" players from various parts of Newfoundland as well as from as far away as Kirkland Lake Ontario and parts of industrial Cape Breton, Nova Scotia.

Buchans Minor Hockey Association sported impressive local Pee-Wee and Bantam leagues. From the 1960s through the early 1980s, Buchans Atom, Pee-Wee, Bantam and Midget teams frequently won championships in NAHA's B divisions. There was also a brief resurgence of championship wins in E-H divisions for Pee-Wee, Bantam and Midget teams from Buchans in the 1990s.

== Final years of Asarco operation ==
On 17 March 1976 Asarco Incorporated, Buchans Unit and Price (Nfld.) Pulp and Paper Limited (Incorporated in 1962 replacing AND co - would later become Abitibi-Price then Abitibi-Bowater) signed a new contract whereby Price repossessed its original mineral exploration rights over the entire 1905 A.N.D. Co. concession area except for the mine site. The two companies agreed to continue sharing the profits from the existing mines and from any future mines developed on deposits discovered by ASARCO prior to March 1976.

In 1980/1981, Asarco also mined a 2,000+ ton bulk sample by way of an adit developed at the Tulks Hill Lead-Zinc orebody near the southwestern corner of Red Indian Lake. (This prospect, with between 600,000 and 800,000 tons of recoverable ore, as of August 2020, had not yet been mined).

In 1977 Asarco began to divest itself of company owned houses and community infrastructure. Asarco shut all mining operations at its Buchans Unit in 1982 with only 12 workers remaining on the property, down from 550 in 1978. Mining resumed briefly in 1983 and 1984 at the MacLean extension and at Oriental Mine where some ore was mined from two pits near Oriental Mine shaft. All mining production ceased in September 1984. 17.5 million tons were mined and processed over the 55-year history of mining at Buchans. ASARCO also closed its remaining barite recovery operation, which had operated seasonally in the early 1980s.

== Buchans since 1984 ==
In the years since the closure of the Asarco operation, the population of the town, which had fluctuated but remained between 2,500 and 3,000 throughout the most prosperous years of the mine, began to drop in the late 1970s as ore reserves dwindled, production declined and layoffs occurred. By 1985, the population had decreased to 1,500. The 2011 Canadian Census reported the population of Buchans to be 696. The 2016 census reported the population of Buchans to be 642.

Considerable environmental remediation work and study continued after Asarco's initial work on tailings revegetation in the mid-1970s. This work was also complemented with a multitude of studies, water and soil monitoring activities, and mine site decommissioning/demolition projects throughout the 1980s and 1990s. Few of the mine site(s)' structures remain. Most of those that do remain are now used by other enterprises in the area. While Asarco maintained a consultancy presence until the early 2000s, most of the responsibility for ongoing remediation and monitoring belonged to Abitibi-Price (later called Abitibi Consolidated and later still Abitibi Bowater). Companies including but not limited to Amec and Boojum have studied the area and aided in the remediation efforts. Most of Abitibi Bowater's assets in Newfoundland were expropriated by the government of Newfoundland and Labrador in December 2008 and Abitibi Bowater later filed for Creditor Protection in 2009. With expropriation, responsibility for the land and assets in the Red Indian Lake watershed area, including Buchans, mostly came to rest with the provincial government's crown corporation - Nalcor.

In recent months and years, in light of the financial difficulties of involved companies and some community interest, the provincial government has taken a renewed interest in one of the remaining stages of Buchans mine remediation - an older "tailings spill" area located to the southwest of the Town. Testing of one of the samples from this tailings area re-confirmed the (expected) presence of lead, one of the metals mined at Buchans. As a precautionary step, in 2009, provincial officials asked residents to be tested for lead levels in their blood. This testing yielded no results warranting further medical attention and no health risks were found. The 2010 Newfoundland and Labrador budget included $4 million to aid in the beautification, final cleanup and additional remediation of this site. This work was completed between 2010 and 2013.

There has been intermittent renewed private interest in the recycling of mine tailings to remove Barite for use in engineering services related to offshore drilling. A reorganized version of the Barite recycling operation first attempted by Asarco in the early 1980s, prepared and tested by another group in the late 1990s, did operate under Pennecon in 2009 and intermittently under another partnership in the 2010s. The tailings ponds near the Lucky Strike mine site contain millions of tons of material that is 30% barite.

In the years since the Asarco mine closure, many businesses continue to thrive in the town of Buchans. It remains a tourist destination - especially for people interested in fishing, hunting, hiking, other outdoor activities or learning about the town's rich mining heritage.

Many Buchans expatriates return often and maintain a strong connection with their hometown. In 1986, the Town of Buchans held the first "Come Home Year" festival to encourage former residents to return and celebrate the town's rich history and heritage. Come Home Year festivals have more recently been held every five years, in the summers of 1997, 2002, 2007, 2012, and 2017. The 2022 Come Home Year event marked 95 years since the founding of the town of Buchans. A shorter festival, known as the "Lucky Strike Festival" has been held annually in July during the years between Come Home Year festivals. Fundraising efforts at these events, as well as others such as the annual "Save Our Plant" (SOP) curling bonspiel help ensure that the residents of Buchans are able to continue to maintain and enjoy many of the exceptional recreational facilities and amenities established during the Asarco mining era.

== Climate ==
As typical of Newfoundland, Buchans has a humid continental climate with maritime influences. It has significant seasonal lag, which renders September to be only slightly cooler than June in spite of much less daylight. Over the course of the year temperatures are relatively cold for being a humid continental climate, but the extended summer season above 10 °C (50 °F) in mean temperatures keeps it above the subarctic threshold. Buchans receives relatively high precipitation year-round, causing plenty of snowfall in winter.

Climate data for Buchans
Month	Jan	Feb	Mar	Apr	May	Jun	Jul	Aug	Sep	Oct	Nov	Dec	Year
Record high °C (°F)	13.5 (56.3)	10 (50)	17 (63)	20.6 (69.1)	27.5 (81.5)	32 (90)	33 (91)	32 (90)	30 (86)	22.5 (72.5)	15.6 (60.1)	12.8 (55.0)	33 (91)
Mean daily maximum °C (°F)	−4.6 (23.7)	−4.4 (24.1)	−0.9 (30.4)	4.6 (40.3)	11.5 (52.7)	17 (63)	21.1 (70.0)	20.9 (69.6)	15.8 (60.4)	9.1 (48.4)	3.1 (37.6)	−1.5 (29.3)	7.6 (45.7)
Daily mean °C (°F)	−8.2 (17.2)	−8.4 (16.9)	−4.8 (23.4)	1 (34)	7 (45)	12.1 (53.8)	16.3 (61.3)	16.2 (61.2)	11.9 (53.4)	6 (43)	0.5 (32.9)	−4.5 (23.9)	3.8 (38.8)
Mean daily minimum °C (°F)	−11.8 (10.8)	−12.3 (9.9)	−8.7 (16.3)	−2.5 (27.5)	2.5 (36.5)	7.1 (44.8)	11.4 (52.5)	11.6 (52.9)	7.9 (46.2)	2.8 (37.0)	−2.1 (28.2)	−7.5 (18.5)	−0.1 (31.8)
Record low °C (°F)	−30 (−22)	−33.5 (−28.3)	−30.5 (−22.9)	−22.5 (−8.5)	−10 (14)	−3.3 (26.1)	1 (34)	1.1 (34.0)	−2.2 (28.0)	−8.3 (17.1)	−19 (−2)	−26 (−15)	−33.5 (−28.3)
Average precipitation mm (inches)	122 (4.8)	98.1 (3.86)	95 (3.7)	85.7 (3.37)	86.6 (3.41)	87.8 (3.46)	95.3 (3.75)	123 (4.8)	110.4 (4.35)	97.5 (3.84)	111.8 (4.40)	123.1 (4.85)	1,236.2 (48.67)
Average snowfall cm (inches)	88.3 (34.8)	72.5 (28.5)	55.5 (21.9)	26.2 (10.3)	4.4 (1.7)	0.1 (0.0)	0.0 (0.0)	0.0 (0.0)	0.1 (0.0)	5.0 (2.0)	30.4 (12.0)	76.9 (30.3)	359.3 (141.5)
Average precipitation days	14	11.1	11.4	11.3	12.6	12	12.4	12.2	13.6	14.4	13.4	14.7	153.1

== See also ==
- List of cities and towns in Newfoundland and Labrador
