= Grand Falls-Windsor =

Town in Newfoundland and Labrador, Canada

- Town
- Town of Grand Falls-Windsor
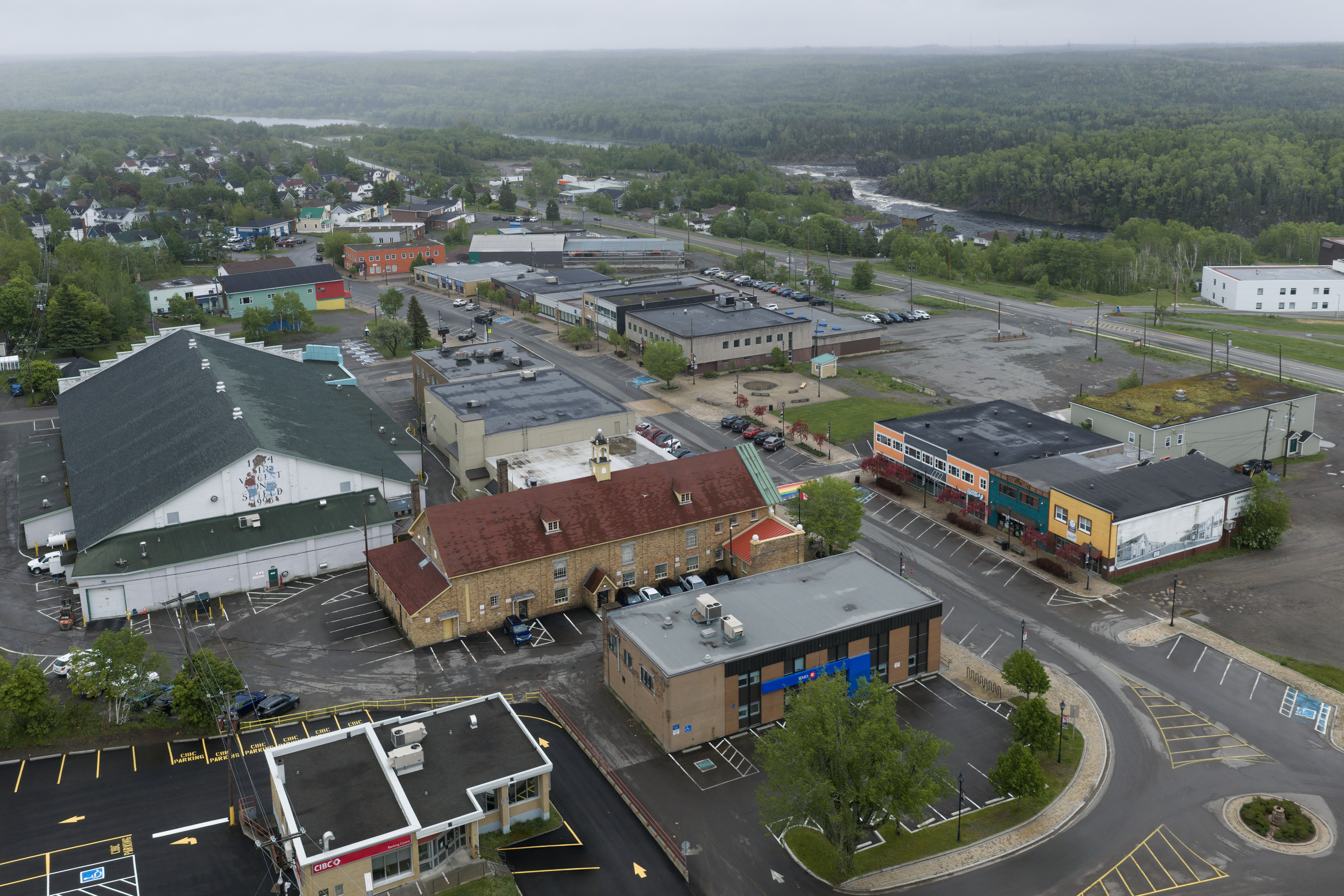
- Downtown (2026)

- Seal
- Motto(s): "E Silva Surrexi" (Latin) "'I arose out of the forest"
- Location of Grand Falls-Windsor in Newfoundland
- Coordinates: 48°56′13″N 55°38′42″W
- Country: Canada
- Province: Newfoundland and Labrador
- Census division: Division No. 6
- Incorporated: January 1, 1991

Government
  - Mayor: Mike Browne (since 2025)
  - MHA: Chris Tibbs (PC); Pleaman Forsey (PC)
  - MP: Clifford Small (CPC)

Area
  - Land: 54.67 km^{2} (21.11 sq mi)
- Elevation: 48 m (157 ft)

Population (2021)
  - Total: 13,853
  - Density: 259.2/km^{2} (671/sq mi)
- Time zone: UTC−03:30 (Newfoundland Standard Time Zone)
  - Summer (DST): UTC−02:30 (Newfoundland Daylight)
- Canadian Postal code: A2A, A2B
- Area code: 709
- Highways: Route 1 (TCH)
- Website: Town of Grand Falls-Windsor

Grand Falls-Windsor is a town located in the central region of the island of Newfoundland in the province of Newfoundland and Labrador, Canada, with a population of 13,853 at the 2021 census. The town is the largest in the central region, the sixth largest in the province, and is home to the annual Exploits Valley Salmon Festival. Grand Falls-Windsor was incorporated in 1991, when the two former towns of Grand Falls and Windsor amalgamated.

Grand Falls-Windsor is one of two major population centres in Central Newfoundland.

== History ==
In 1768, Lieutenant John Cartwright, while following the Exploits River through the Exploits Valley, named the waterfall he found "Grand Falls". The land remained undeveloped until 1905, except for the Newfoundland Railway, which ran about 4 miles (6.4 km) north of Grand Falls. The railway offered development potential.

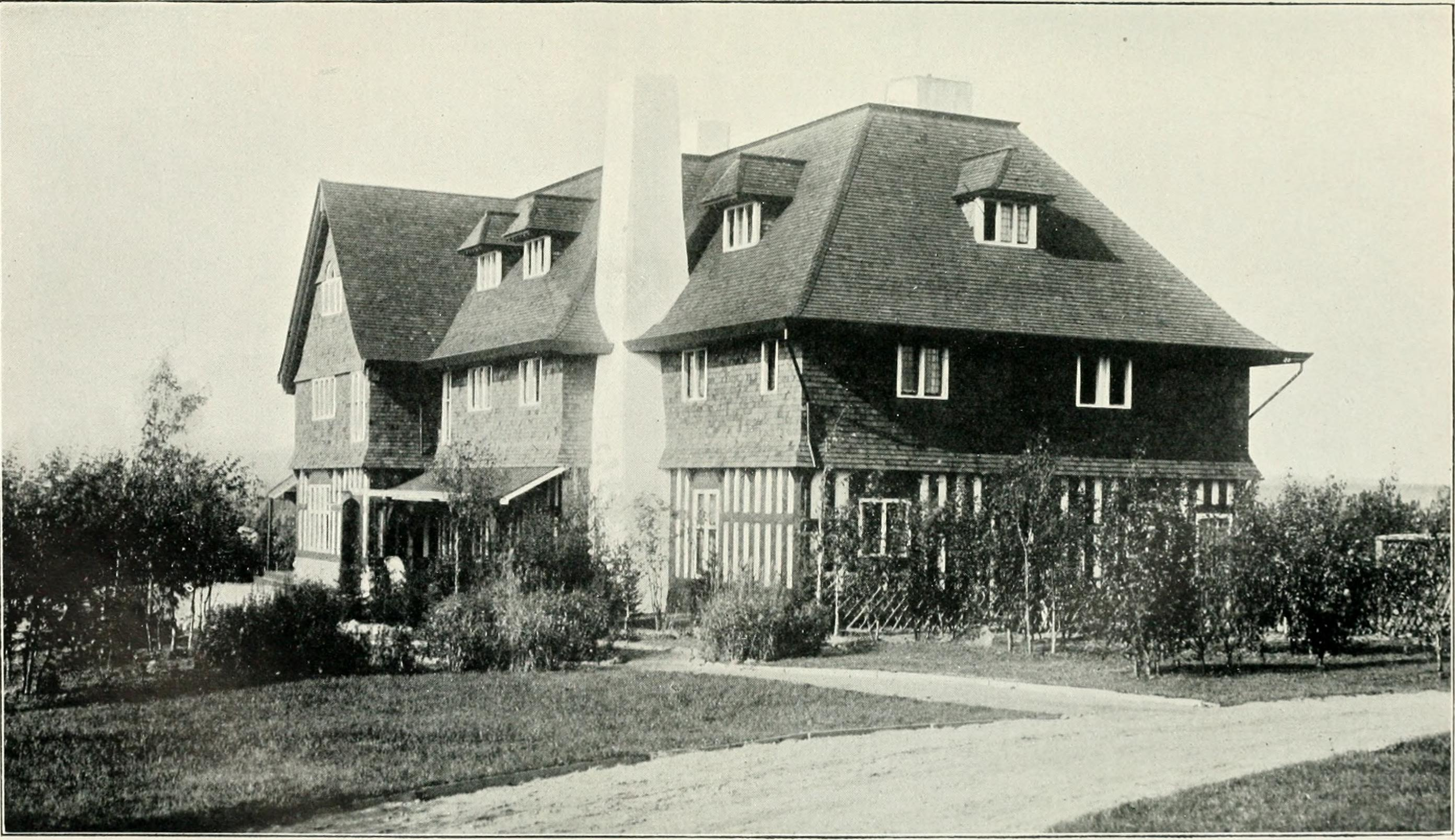
Harmsworth House, Grand Falls (bef. 1911)

In 1905, the town of Grand Falls was established as a company town using Garden City principles expounded by Ebenezer Howard. Worried about the impending war in Europe, Alfred Harmsworth (Baron Northcliffe) began looking for an alternative source of newsprint for his family's newspaper and publishing business. During their search for a suitable location to build and operate a pulp and paper mill, Harold Harmsworth and Mayson Beeton, son of Isabella Beeton, the author of Mrs Beeton's Book of Household Management, discovered Grand Falls. The site had great potential due to access to lumber, the possibility of hydroelectricity and a deep-water port available in nearby Botwood. On January 7, 1905, the Harmsworths and Robert Gillespie Reid, owner of the Newfoundland Railway, formed the Anglo-Newfoundland Development Company, and the mill was constructed and opened on October 9, 1909. The first roll of salable newsprint was produced on December 22, 1909. Workers came from throughout the colony and the world to help develop the new area. At that time, only employees of the mill and workers from private businesses were permitted to live in Grand Falls. Other people settled north of the railway in a shack town known as Grand Falls Station, which became Windsor, named for the Canadian Royal Family.

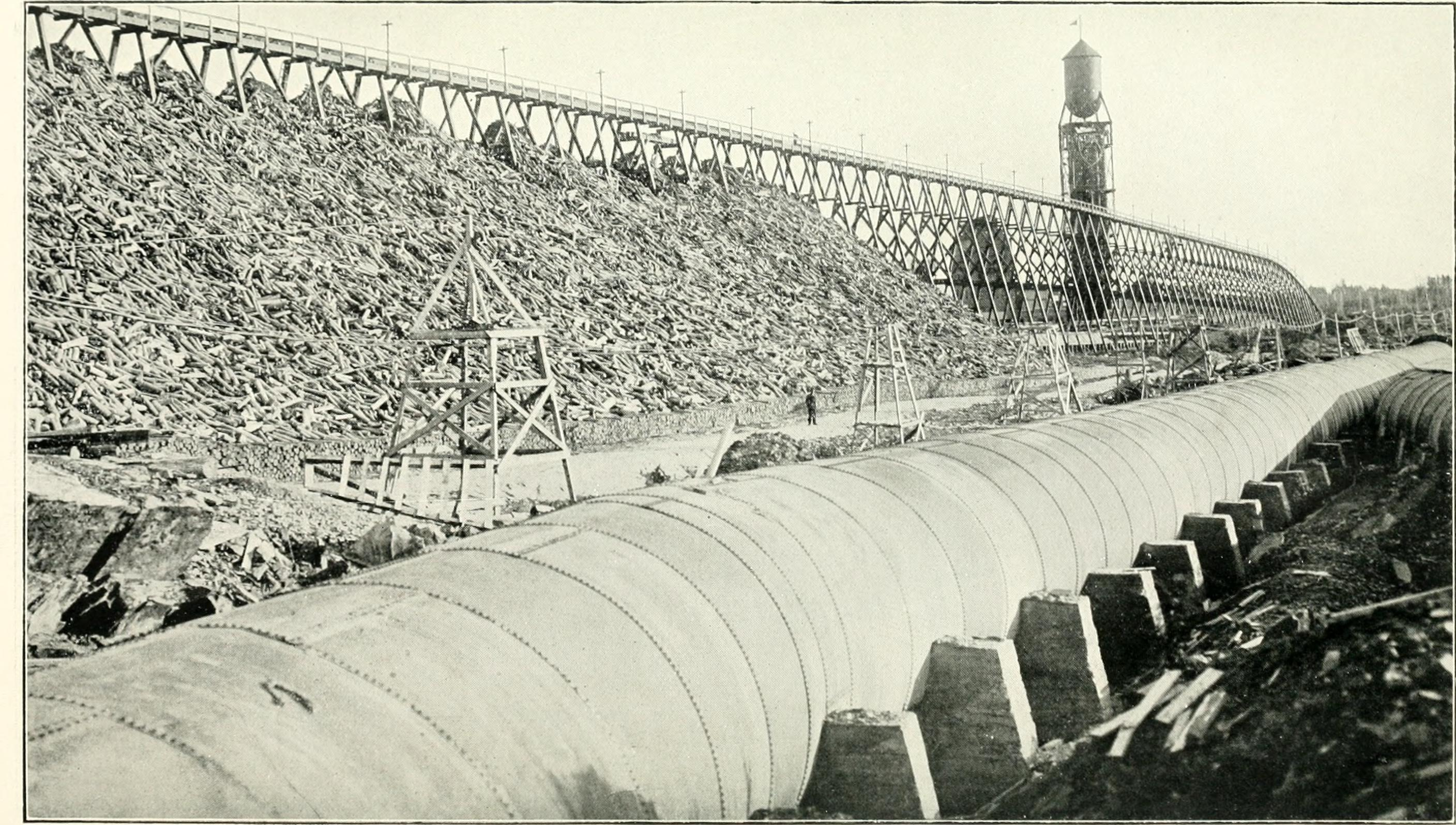
Penstock and log carriers (bef. 1911)

The Anglo Newfoundland Development Company, owners of the town, catered to the social and athletic needs of the people living there. The Grand Falls Athletic Club was formed in 1907. Sports such as hockey, boxing, golf, soccer and baseball were played in the area. Increasing interest in music and the arts reflected in the creation of several clubs, including The Andophians, The Exploits Amateur Theatre Company, the Northcliffe Drama Club (1951) and Another Newfoundland Drama Company Inc. (A.N.D. Company Inc.) (1998). Several musical groups were formed. From 1905 to 1906, the religious needs of the residents were filled by visiting clergy. However, because of the increasing population of Grand Falls, several churches were built.

Due to its continued growth, Grand Falls Station became a vibrant town. Main Street, in what is now the former town of Windsor, featured lines of small business that catered to the needs of the residents and the town was officially incorporated on November 1, 1938. During the incorporation, Grand Falls Station changed its name to Windsor in honour of the British royal family, the House of Windsor.

In 1961, Price Brothers and Company Limited acquired a large amount of Anglo Newfoundland Development Company stock. An election for the first municipal government was soon held, which eventually led to the incorporation of the town of Grand Falls. In 1988, the town took the title of the World Forestry Capital briefly. Finally, in 1991, the towns of Grand Falls and Windsor voted to amalgamate, becoming the current town of Grand Falls-Windsor. The Abitibi Bowater pulp and paper mill closed in 2009.

In 1998, the Texas Vampires scandal occurred in the town, leading to the inception of the Newfoundland Health Research Ethics Authority.

Today, the 2nd Battalion of the Royal Newfoundland Regiment, part of the 5th Canadian Division, is stationed in the town.

== Geography ==
The town is located centrally on the island of Newfoundland. It is approximately an hour west of Gander, two and a half hours west of Clarenville and about four hours west of St. John's. On the other hand, the town is slightly over two hours east of Deer Lake, two hours and forty-five minutes east of Corner Brook and close to five hours east of Port Aux Basques, when traveling on the Newfoundland and Labrador Route 1, part of the Trans-Canada Highway.

The town itself consists of the former towns of Grand Falls and Windsor. The Newfoundland and Labrador Route 1 runs through the middle of town, with exits for Main Street, Station Road, Cromer Avenue, Union Street, Grenfell Heights and New Bay Road. Main thoroughfares in the town include Lincoln Road, Cromer Avenue, Main Street, High Street, and Scott Avenue, though this list is not exhaustive.

=== Climate ===
Grand Falls-Windsor has a humid continental climate (Koppen: Dfb), its classification being similar to the remainder of Newfoundland. Due to its farther inland position than most localities the influence of the Atlantic Ocean and its moderation is less prevalent, rendering its summers the warmest on the island. Winter lows are also more extreme than in St. John's and Corner Brook, although swings are very moderate when compared to areas on similar latitudes in continental Canada.

Climate data for Grand Falls-Windsor
Month	Jan	Feb	Mar	Apr	May	Jun	Jul	Aug	Sep	Oct	Nov	Dec	Year
Record high °C (°F)	12.5 (54.5)	13 (55)	20 (68)	23 (73)	29.4 (84.9)	33.5 (92.3)	34.4 (93.9)	33.9 (93.0)	30.5 (86.9)	27.2 (81.0)	20.6 (69.1)	16.7 (62.1)	34.4 (93.9)
Mean daily maximum °C (°F)	−2.6 (27.3)	−2.6 (27.3)	1.2 (34.2)	6.8 (44.2)	13.5 (56.3)	18.6 (65.5)	22.7 (72.9)	22.3 (72.1)	17.4 (63.3)	10.7 (51.3)	4.9 (40.8)	0.0 (32.0)	9.4 (48.9)
Daily mean °C (°F)	−7.7 (18.1)	−8.0 (17.6)	−3.8 (25.2)	2.3 (36.1)	8.1 (46.6)	12.7 (54.9)	17.1 (62.8)	16.8 (62.2)	12.2 (54.0)	6.4 (43.5)	1.4 (34.5)	−4.1 (24.6)	4.5 (40.1)
Mean daily minimum °C (°F)	−12.8 (9.0)	−13.3 (8.1)	−8.7 (16.3)	−2.3 (27.9)	2.7 (36.9)	6.8 (44.2)	11.3 (52.3)	11.2 (52.2)	6.9 (44.4)	2.0 (35.6)	−2.2 (28.0)	−8 (18)	−0.5 (31.1)
Record low °C (°F)	−35.6 (−32.1)	−34.4 (−29.9)	−30.6 (−23.1)	−20.6 (−5.1)	−8.3 (17.1)	−2.2 (28.0)	0.5 (32.9)	0 (32)	−6.7 (19.9)	−8.3 (17.1)	−17.8 (0.0)	−29.4 (−20.9)	−35.6 (−32.1)
Average precipitation mm (inches)	93.6 (3.69)	93.7 (3.69)	90.8 (3.57)	84.0 (3.31)	78.5 (3.09)	89.4 (3.52)	88.5 (3.48)	107.3 (4.22)	95.6 (3.76)	94.2 (3.71)	93.6 (3.69)	89.8 (3.54)	1,098.9 (43.26)
Average rainfall mm (inches)	31.8 (1.25)	30.3 (1.19)	36.8 (1.45)	53.1 (2.09)	74.1 (2.92)	88.7 (3.49)	88.5 (3.48)	107.3 (4.22)	95.6 (3.76)	90.4 (3.56)	72.5 (2.85)	36.8 (1.45)	806.1 (31.74)
Average snowfall cm (inches)	59.8 (23.5)	59.0 (23.2)	49.7 (19.6)	27.4 (10.8)	4.2 (1.7)	0.6 (0.2)	0.0 (0.0)	0.0 (0.0)	0.0 (0.0)	3.5 (1.4)	21.6 (8.5)	49.2 (19.4)	275.0 (108.3)
Source: Environment Canada

== Economy ==
On December 4, 2008, Abitibi Bowater released a statement concerning imminent closure of the pulp and paper mill in Grand Falls-Windsor, representing a cutback of 205 000 tons of paper. The mill produced its last roll of newsprint on February 12, 2009. The closure was effected due to exchange rate volatility, energy, and fiber pricing, as well as structural challenges in the North American newsprint industry. At the time of closure, the paper mill was the second largest employer of the town. From 2016 to 2017, the mill was demolished.

Like most other communities in Newfoundland and Labrador, Grand Falls-Windsor has suffered from out-migration. However, the town endures as the service centre for all of Central Newfoundland. Despite the mill closure, businesses continue to grow in the community. Central Health is the largest employer in the town. The town's heritage centre now stands where the mill training centre once did.

== Services ==
=== Education ===
The town is part of the Newfoundland and Labrador English School District and is served by Woodland Primary (kindergarten to grade 3), Sprucewood Academy (Grade 4 to Grade 6), Forest Park Primary (kindergarten to Grade 3), Exploits Valley Intermediate (Grade 7 to Grade 9) and Exploits Valley High (Grade 10 to Grade 12).

Post-secondary training is available at the College of the North Atlantic, a community college formed in 1977.

Private colleges include Keyin College and Corona College.

=== Health ===
Healthcare services in the town are administered by Newfoundland and Labrador Health Services.

=== Transportation ===
The nearest airport is the Exploits Valley (Botwood) Airport located north of Bishop's Falls which is used for hospital medical airlift transports and some private small aircraft. The nearest international airport is Gander International Airport, approximately 100 km (62 mi) east of Grand Falls-Windsor. There is a public heliport on Scott Avenue, Grand Falls-Windsor Heliport operated by the town.

=== Media and communications ===
Communication services are provided by AT&T Canada, Primus Canada and Aliant, formerly NewTel Communications. The companies provide mobile phones, high speed Internet and digital television, including CJON-TV (NTV), the only privately owned television station in Newfoundland and Labrador, and other services.

The local newspaper, the Advertiser, was published twice weekly from 1936 until 2017, and has been replaced by The Central Voice. It had a readership of more than 10,000 per edition and had won numerous awards, both regionally and nationally. The paper was first published by brothers Mike and Walter Blackmore, with Mike's wife, the former Laura Cantwell, serving as the first editor.

Private radio stations in the town include CHEV-FM (94.5), CKXG-FM (102.3), CKCM (620), a VOCM affiliate, both owned by Stingray Radio and CKMY-FM (95.9) owned by Geoff Stirling. The other private radio station is VOAR-8-FM (98.3), which is part of the Seventh-day Adventist Church. The Canadian Broadcasting Corporation has CBT-FM (93.3), CBC Radio One and CBN-FM-1 (90.7), CBC Music.

CBNAT was the call sign for the local CBC rebroadcaster of CBNT from St. John's. Rogers TV which provides a community channel that includes a local talk show focused on community events called Exploits Central.

== Sports ==
The town has two hockey teams, the senior team, Grand Falls-Windsor Cataracts and the Grand Falls-Windsor Blades. The Cataracts won the 2017 Allan Cup, symbolic of Senior Hockey supremacy in Canada.

== Demographics ==
Historical population
Year	Pop.	±%
1935	5,691	—
1951	7,601	+33.6%
1966	14,143	+86.1%
1971	14,321	+1.3%
1981	14,512	+1.3%
1991	14,693	+1.2%
2001	13,340	−9.2%
2006	13,558	+1.6%
2011	13,725	+1.2%
2016	14,171	+3.2%
2021	13,853	−2.2%

In the 2021 Census of Population conducted by Statistics Canada, Grand Falls-Windsor had a population of 13,853 living in 6,122 of its 6,628 total private dwellings, a change of −2.2% from its 2016 population of 14,171. With a land area of 54.84 km^{2} (21.17 sq mi), it had a population density of 252.6/km^{2} (654.3/sq mi) in 2021.

As of 2006, there are 6,420 (47.35%) male residents and 7,140 (52.66%) female residents with the median age of male residents at 42.4 and the median age of female residents at 42.8. The median age of the town's population is getting older, from 36.2 at the 1996 census to 40.2 in the 2001 census and to 42.6 in 2006, compared to the province as a whole at 41.7.

Of the population in 2006, 790 (5.83%) people were in a common-law relationship, 3,160 (23.31%) were single, 650 (4.79%) divorced, 830 (6.12%) were widowed, 315 (2.32%) separated and the rest, 6,455 (47.54) were married. Visible minority groups in the town are Aboriginal people (225 or 1.66%) followed by Chinese Canadians (70 or 0.52%), Arab Canadians (35 or 0.26%), Indo-Canadians (South Asian Canadian) (30 or 0.22%) and Filipino Canadians (15 or 0.11%).

In 2001, the majority of residents – 8,405 (63.01%) of them – were Protestant, 4,420 (33.13%) were Catholic, 10 (0.07%) were Christian Orthodox, 35 (0.26%) were Christian, 10 (0.07%) were Hindu and 285 (2.14%) residents had no religious affiliation.

The 2006 unemployment rate in the town was 17.0% slightly down from 17.7% in 2001 and below the provincial average of 18.6%. In 2000, the average annual earnings of part-time working residents was $26,671, compared to the provincial average of $24,165. The average earnings of full-time workers was $38,665, again slightly above the provincial average of $37,910.

== Sights ==
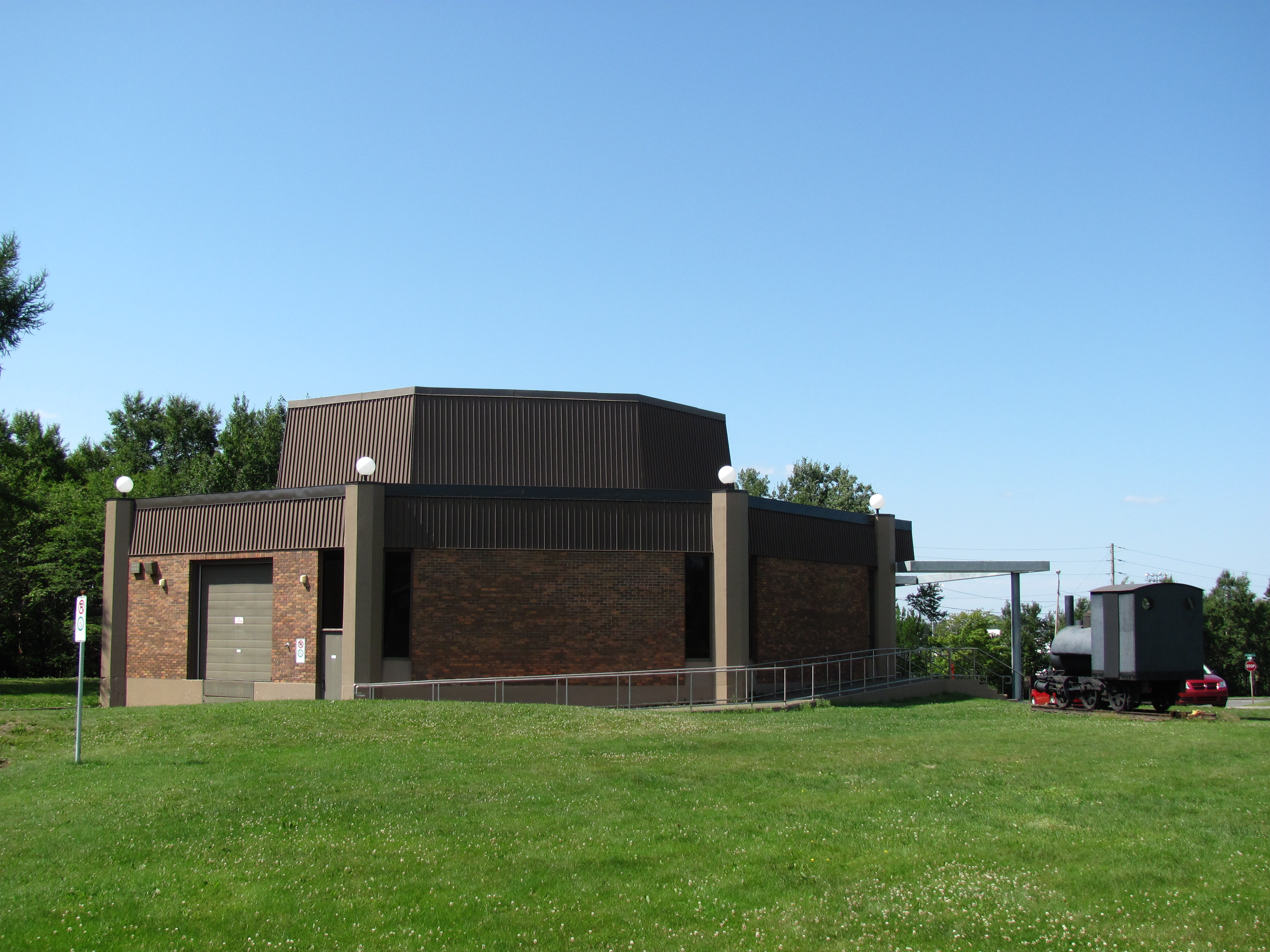
Demasduit Regional Museum

Demasduit Regional Museum in Grand Falls, 24 Catherine St., shows exhibits about the Beothuk people, geology, regional industry and natural history. It was previously referred to as Mary March Provincial Museum, after Demasduit's anglicized name, and was changed out of respect in 2021. A locomotive of the Newfoundland Railway which was closed down in 1988 can be seen in front of the museum. The Salmonid Interpretation Centre at the Grand Falls is noteworthy as well Also every year in summer the Salmon Festival is held; it has had performances by Aerosmith, Kiss, and The Eagles.

=== Harmsworth Hall ===
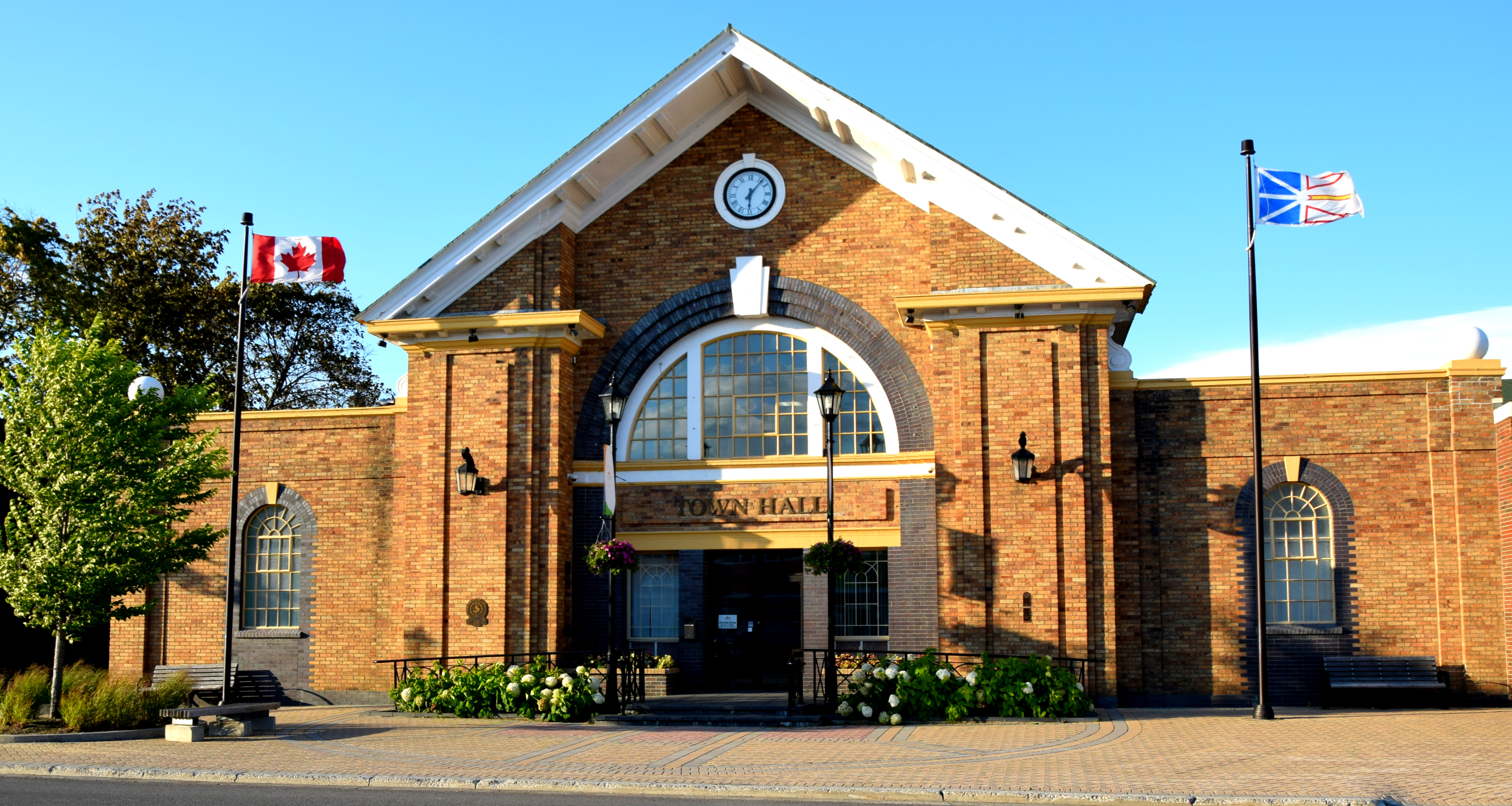
Town Hall

Harmsworth Hall was constructed by the Anglo-Newfoundland Development Company in 1929. This was one of the most important companies in Newfoundland in the early part of the 20th century. It was largely responsible for the development of Grand Falls as a town with the creation of a pulp-and-paper mill. The company named the hall after one of the original owners of the mill, and for decades it served the community as a theatre, playhouse and meeting hall.

The Town of Grand Falls was incorporated in 1963, and the company gave the building to the new municipality as a town hall. Since then, the city council has renovated the interior to include offices and council chambers. The hall still operates as the offices for the Town of Grand Falls-Windsor.

The hall has a wood frame with a brick exterior and stands two storeys tall. It has roof trim moulding, copper flashing and large arched windows that overlook High Street, the main street in Grand Falls. It has concrete lintels over the doors and windows, and the centre portion of the hall features a peaked roof.

Harmsworth Hall became a Registered Heritage Structure in 1998. It is one of very few heritage structures in central Newfoundland.

== Notable people ==
- Don Howse, National Hockey League player
- George Ivany, President of the University of Saskatchewan from 1989 to 1999
- Gordon Pinsent, television, theatre and film actor
- Dave Pichette, retired professional National Hockey League hockey defenseman who played with the Quebec Nordiques, St. Louis Blues, New Jersey Devils, and New York Rangers
- Terry Ryan, ice hockey centre
- Jagmeet Singh, former leader of the federal New Democratic Party (spent part of his childhood in Grand Falls-Windsor)
- Tony White, retired professional National Hockey League hockey player who played with the Washington Capitals, and Minnesota North Stars

== See also ==
- Gander–Grand Falls
- Grand Falls-Windsor Cataracts
- Demasduit
- Labrador (electoral district) (formerly known as Grand Falls–White Bay–Labrador and Grand Falls–White Bay)
- Terra Nova Tel
- Texas Vampires
