= Millertown Junction =

Canadian settlement

Coordinates: 49.010°N 56.332°W

Location of Millertown Junction in Newfoundland and Labrador

Millertown Junction is a settlement on the island of Newfoundland in the Canadian Province of Newfoundland and Labrador. It is located at the northeast end of the small lake called Joe Glodes Pond, about where the original railway settlement was though summer cabins have spread in recent years down the eastern fringe of the lake, and a short distance to the west. Millertown Junction was last officially reported in the census in 1981 when it returned a population of 23, the latest in a series of dramatic falls connected with the closing of the railway. Recent years have seen an increase in population, however.

== History ==
Millertown Junction was the place where the Buchans railway connected with the Newfoundland railway mainline and the connecting point for passengers to Millertown and Buchans. From 1928 to 1968 when the Buchans Mine was still in operation, there was a steady stream of passengers back and forth between the two railways, making Millertown Junction one of the busiest stations along the main line. The Newfoundland Railway agent and the Buchans Railway agent worked in their separate station buildings a hundred yards apart on the station platform, but they were in frequent contact with each other. Accommodation had to be provided for the passengers and the staff house provided it. Meeting the Express was always an exciting event for the local population. This was also a point where trains often were backed up when the tracks across the Gaff Topsails were blocked.

== See also ==
- Millertown Railway
- Newfoundland Railway
