= University of Ottawa Heart Institute =

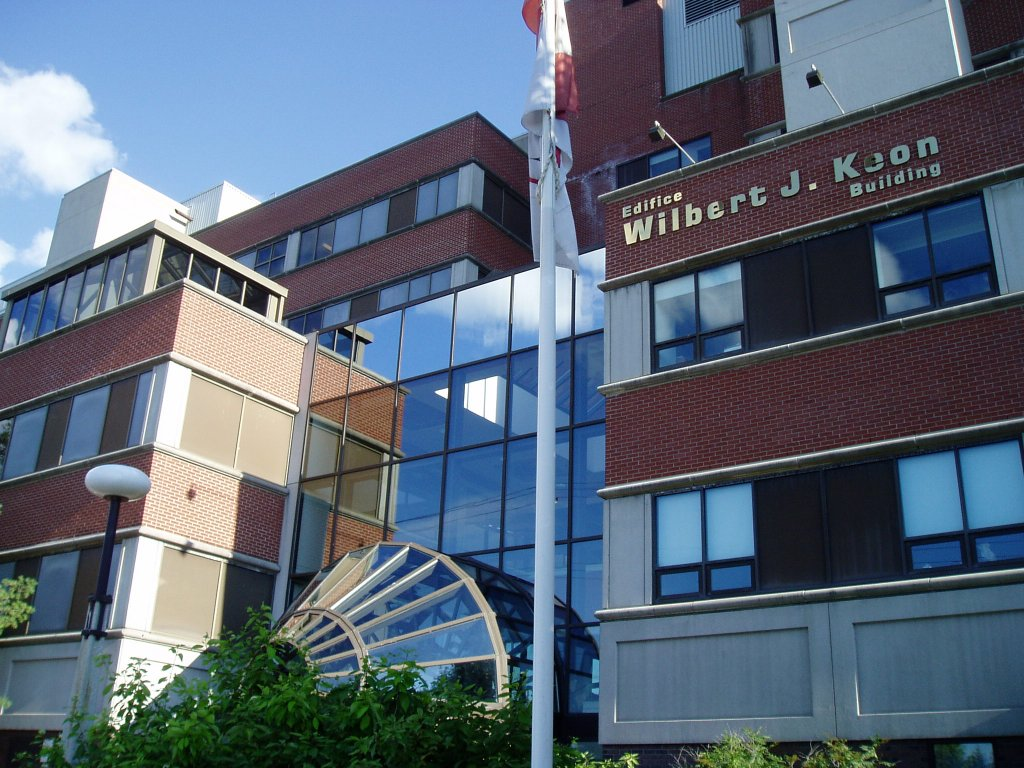

Geography
- Location: 40 Ruskin Street; Ottawa, Ontario; K1Y 4W7
- Coordinates: 45.393811°N 75.722044°W

Organisation
- Care system: Medicare
- Type: Specialist
- Affiliated university: University of Ottawa & The Ottawa Hospital

Services
- Emergency department: No; Accident and Emergency at The Ottawa Hospital; Ottawa Civic Hospital; Ottawa General Hospital
- Speciality: Cardiology

History
- Founded: 1976

Links
- Website: www.ottawaheart.ca

The University of Ottawa Heart Institute (UOHI) (French: Institut de cardiologie de l'Université d'Ottawa (ICUO)) is Canada's largest cardiovascular health centre. It is highly regarded, along with Toronto General Hospital, as the foremost cardiac hospital in Canada. It is located in Ottawa, Ontario, Canada. It began as a department in The Ottawa Hospital, and since has evolved into a complete cardiac centre, encompassing prevention, diagnosis, treatment, rehabilitation, research, and education.

UOHI cares for more than 60,000 cardiac patients each year, and patient satisfaction is among the highest in Ontario, averaging 87 percent. The Heart Institute is affiliated with the Ottawa Hospital and the University of Ottawa, specifically the Faculty of Medicine.

The institute also provides training to more than 100 physicians annually and runs an extensive cardiovascular research program, with 65 research faculty and research funding of approximately $65 million a year.

== History ==
UOHI was founded in 1976 by Dr. Wilbert Keon, with financial support from the Ontario Ministry of Education. Keon worked with numerous partners, including all of the hospitals in the region, the University of Ottawa, and the Ottawa Hospital Regional District Planning council, to ensure the vision of a world-renowned institute would unfold as planned. The first phase of the Heart Institute—the Cardiac Unit, as it was then known—officially opened on May 11, 1976.

UOHI is the sole, independent provider of specialized cardiovascular care for 14 hospitals within the Ottawa region, home to over 1 million people (9 percent of the population of Ontario), and serves more than 40 referral hospitals throughout the province.

In 2004, UOHI recruited Dr. Robert Roberts from Baylor College of Medicine to serve as President and Chief Executive Officer. Roberts, an internationally recognized investigator in the field of molecular genetics, was brought in to place a greater emphasis on research within the institute. Shortly afterwards, UOHI established the Ruddy Canadian Cardiovascular Genetics Centre, the first such centre in Canada and one of only a handful worldwide dedicated to cardiovascular genetics.

In April 2014, former Heart Institute Chief of Cardiac Surgery Dr. Thierry Mesana took over as the third President and CEO of UOHI.

In April 2024, former Heart Institute Deputy Director General Dr. Rob Beanlands became the fourth President and CEO of UOHI.

The institute has been responsible for numerous ‘firsts’, including:

- First use of point of care genetic testing in clinical medicine as part of the RAPID GENE study.
- Ontario's first angioplasty
- The first use in Canada, and 11th in the world, of the Jarvik 7 artificial heart as a bridge to transplant
- A heart transplant on the youngest recipient in Canada (an 11-day-old infant)
- Canada's first cardiac positron emission tomography (PET) centre
- Discovery of a genetic mutation that causes one of the most common forms of heart disease—atrial fibrillation
- Identification of the first single-nucleotide polymorphism that increases susceptibility to heart disease regardless of other established risk factors
- A one-of-a-kind Canadian home tele-health monitoring program that cuts hospital readmission by 54 percent for heart failure patients
- A first multi-faceted Women's Heart Health Centre that will focus its programs on prevention and management services for women at risk of and diagnosed with cardiovascular disease.

== Clinical specialties ==
UOHI maintains a clinical staff of over 700, including physicians, nurses, technicians, and other health professionals. In addition to standard care, approximately 100 clinical trials are underway at the institute at any time.

=== Cardiac anesthesiology ===
More than 1,900 open-heart procedures at UOHI each year require anesthesia, including coronary artery bypass, valve replacement, heart transplant, pulmonary thromboendarterectomy, mechanical circulatory assist devices and others. Clinical anesthesia is also provided for a growing number and variety of pacemaker and implantable cardioverter-defibrillator, percutaneous aortic valve, and arrhythmia procedures.

=== Cardiac imaging ===
UOHI is a national centre for cardiac imaging. The institute employs all standard imaging modalities and evaluates experimental techniques and applications. UOHI also has the rare capability to develop and produce novel, short-lived nuclear tracers on site. The on-site cyclotron lets the institute produce many of its own medical isotopes, particularly for PET imaging. UOHI’s Nuclear Cardiology Program is the largest such clinical program in Canada.

=== Cardiac surgery ===
UOHI's cardiac surgeons perform more than 1,900 open-heart procedures annually, and the institute is known for its reconstructive heart-valve surgery program. Dr. Pierre Voisine is the Chief of Cardiac Surgery. It has among the lowest mortality rates and largest patient volumes in North America, especially for high-risk patients. Surgical specialties include:

- Heart valve repair
- Percutaneous aortic valve replacement
- Multi-vessel small thoracotomy
- Heart transplantation
- Mechanical assist devices
- Thoracoscopic surgical ablation
- Pulmonary thromboendarterectomy

The Heart Institute is the provincial centre for pulmonary thromboendarterectomy.

=== Cardiac Prevention and Rehabilitation ===
The Cardiac Prevention and Rehabilitation program focuses its efforts in five areas: cardiac rehabilitation, prevention and wellness (for patient and public education), the Champlain Cardiovascular Disease Prevention Network, the Ottawa Model for Smoking Cessation (implemented in more than 200 medical institutions across Canada), and behavioral and risk modification research.

=== Cardiology ===
Approximately 60,000 patients a year visit UOHI’s cardiology clinics for testing and treatment of heart disorders. The Cardiology program operates a number of specialized clinics that address various conditions and risk factors for heart disease.

The institute's cardiologists conduct more than 12,000 non-surgical interventions annually.

The ST-Elevation Myocardial Infarction (STEMI) Protocol, developed at UOHI, specifies that paramedic in Ottawa identify patients with a STEMI heart attack and transport them directly to the Institute. The program has cut mortality rates from heart attack in Ottawa by half.

=== Clinical services ===
UOHI’s division of nursing manages or supports programs and units within the Heart Institute, including the cardiac catheterization and electrophysiology labs, the cardiac operating rooms, the cardiac surgery intensive care unit and the intensive cardiac care unit.

UOHI offers specialized cardiac nursing training and education in a number of areas, such as critical care, provincial programs in cardiac CT, cardiac PET, artificial hearts, and pulmonary thromboendarterectomy.

== Research ==
Since 2004, a concerted effort to grow research funding at UOHI has resulted in a 300 percent increase in total grant awards. The Institute has more than 65 research faculty and 130 research staff members whose work encompasses all aspects of cardiovascular medicine. Research programs include:

- Atherosclerosis, Genetics & Cell Biology
- Biomaterials and Regeneration
- Biomedical Engineering
- Cardiac Anesthesiology
- Cardiac Imaging
- Cardiac Prevention & Rehabilitation Research
- Cardiac Surgery Research
- Cardiology Research
- Cardiovascular Devices
- Cardiovascular Endocrinology
- Cardiovascular Genetics
- Cardiovascular Research Methods Centre
- Clinical Services Research
- Clinical Trials
- Hypertension

=== Major findings ===
Heart Institute investigators:

- Identified the strongest genetic risk factor for coronary artery disease and heart attack to date (the 9p21 gene)—the first major risk factor discovered since cholesterol
- Discovered the genetic basis for atrial fibrillation, the most common form of cardiac arrhythmia, affecting 250,000 Canadians
- Conducted the most comprehensive assessment of high blood pressure in Canada in 15 years
- Developed a model smoking cessation program that is in use in more than 200 hospitals across Canada and is being adopted internationally
- Unlocked the mechanism controlling a gene that regulates weight loss
- Developed a novel biomaterial that grows new blood vessels
- Developed Canada's first cardiac autopsy guidelines now in use in Ontario
- Developed an integrated regional protocol that cuts heart attack deaths by half

== Education and training ==
UOHI trains physicians, nurses, technologists, technicians, and other health professionals, as well as graduate students and post-doctoral students in the life and biomedical sciences. The Heart Institute also provides continuing education and best practice training for health care professionals and institutions, and develops patient education tools and programs to facilitate and support self-management of cardiovascular risk factors.

The institute is certified by the Royal College of Physicians and Surgeons of Canada for residency and fellowship training in cardiac surgery, cardiology, and cardiac anesthesiology.

== See also ==
- Toronto General Hospital
