= Newfoundland and Labrador Route 341 =

Highway in Newfoundland and Labrador, Canada

Route 341

Route information
- Maintained by Newfoundland and Labrador Department of Transportation and Infrastructure
- Length: 26.7 km (16.6 mi)

Major junctions
- East end: Route 340 in Lewisporte
- Route 342 in Lewisporte
- West end: Laurenceton

Location
- Country: Canada
- Province: Newfoundland and Labrador

Highway system
- Highways in Newfoundland and Labrador
← Route 340	→ Route 342

Route 341 in Newfoundland and Labrador leads from Lewisporte to Laurenceton on the island of Newfoundland. The highway is relatively short and there are not many communities along the way. The road is notoriously hilly and has many turns, ending in a large dip into Laurenceton. The highway is the only route for residents of Laurenceton to travel to Lewisporte for work.

== Route description ==
Route 341 begins in Lewisporte an intersection with Route 340 (Road to the Isles). It heads north along the banks of Burnt Bay as Main Street to pass through a business district and some neighbourhoods before entering downtown, where Route 341 makes a sharp left at an intersection Route 342. The highway now travels northwest through inland neighbourhoods as Premier Drive before leaving town and becoming Laurenceton Road. Route 341 passes through Stanhope before heading westward through rural wooded areas along the coastline of the Bay of Exploits for several kilometres. The highway then winds its way through Brown's Arm, where it meets a local road leading to Porterville, before passing through more rural areas to enter Laurenceton, where it has an intersection with a local road leading to neighbouring Burnt Arm. Provincial maintenance ends at the western edge of Laurenceton, with the road continuing short and gravel to Sandy Point.

== Major intersections ==
Location	km	mi	Destinations	Notes
Lewisporte	0.0	0.0	Route 340 (Road to the Isles) to Route 1 (TCH) – Summerford, Twillingate	Eastern terminus; provides access to Fogo Island and Change Islands ferries via Routes 331 and 335
Lewisporte	2.9	1.8	Route 342 north (Main Street) – Embree, Little Burnt Bay	Southern terminus of Route 342
Brown's Arm	13.7	8.5	Main Street (Route 341-12) - Porterville	
Laurenceton	24.7	15.3	Burnt Arm Road - Burnt Arm	
Laurenceton	26.7	16.6	End of Provincial maintenance	Western terminus; road continues west as Sandy Point Road
1.000 mi = 1.609 km; 1.000 km = 0.621 mi

== See also ==
- List of Newfoundland and Labrador highways
