= House of Assembly Channel (Newfoundland) =

Cable television channel in Newfoundland and Labrador

The House of Assembly Channel is a cable television channel broadcast throughout much of Newfoundland and Labrador, exclusively on cable. The channel first signed on the air on November 17, 2001.

== Programming ==
The House of Assembly Channel broadcasts daily legislative proceedings from Newfoundland and Labrador whenever the House is sitting, as well as Saturday night Memorial University of Newfoundland Sea-Hawks men's and women's basketball home games, and any special programming produced by Memorial University of Newfoundland or Rogers TV and EastLink Television.

== First broadcast ==
Because the fall sitting of the House of Assembly did not take place until November 19, the first program to be broadcast was on November 17 when the Memorial University Sea-Hawks basketball teams played their first home game of the season against the Dalhousie Tigers.

== Regional carriage ==
The following is a list of communities in Newfoundland and Labrador that receive the House of Assembly Channel on Rogers Cable:

- Botwood: 9
- Burnt Islands: 27
- Carmanville: 25
- Corner Brook: 62
- Deer Lake: 12
- Gander: 60
- Grand Falls-Windsor: 60
- Isle aux Morts: 26
- Musgrave Harbour: 25
- New-Wes-Valley: 26
- Pasadena: 62
- Port aux Basques: 21
- Rose Blanche: 26
- St. John's: 61
- Witless Bay: 24

The following is a list of communities in Newfoundland and Labrador that receive the House of Assembly Channel on EastLink:

- Adam's Cove: 14
- Admirals Beach: 26
- Aguathuna: 4
- Anchor Point: 33
- Appleton: 16
- Aquaforte: 35
- Argentia: 37
- Arnold's Cove: 36
- Aspen Cove: 26
- Avondale: 14
- Bacon Cove: 14
- Badger: 33
- Baie Verte: 37
- Baine Harbour: 30
- Bareneed: 14
- Barr'd Island: 37
- Bauline: 30
- Bay d'Espoir: 35
- Bay de Verde: 14
- Bay l'Argent: 39
- Bay Roberts: 77
- Hampden/Bayside: 31
- Baytona: 27
- Bayview: 45
- The Beaches: 31
- Beachside: 27
- Bear Cove: 33
- Beau Bois: 14
- Belleoram: 28
- Bellevue: 28
- Benoit's Cove: 37
- Birchy Bay: 28
- Brigus: 14
- Calvert: 35
- Cape Broyle: 30
- Cape Ray: 26
- Clarenville: 53
- Codroy: 28
- Conception Harbour: 14
- Flat Bay: 27
- Grand Bank: 37
- Goose Bay: 21
- Harbour Grace: 61
- Hant's Harbour: 14
- Harbour Breton: 36
- New Chelsea: 14
- New Melbourne: 14
- Brownsdale: 14
- Sibley's Cove: 14
- Lead Cove: 14
- Harbour Main: 14
- Holyrood: 14
- Jeffrey's: 33
- Lewisporte: 45
- Lower Island Cove: 14
- Mainland: 28
- Marches Point: 34
- Margaree: 28
- Marystown: 14
- Placentia: 37
- Riverhead: 27
- Springdale: 45
- St. Anthony: 38
- St. David's: 26
- St. George's: 36
- Stephenville: 4
- Twillingate: 45

In Labrador City and Wabush, the Community Recreation Rebroadcasting Service carries the House of Assembly Channel on channel 18.
