= Newfoundland and Labrador Route 342 =

Highway in Newfoundland and Labrador, Canada

Route 342

Route information
- Maintained by Newfoundland and Labrador Department of Transportation and Infrastructure
- Length: 16.7 km (10.4 mi)

Major junctions
- South end: Route 341 in Lewisporte
- North end: Little Burnt Bay

Location
- Country: Canada
- Province: Newfoundland and Labrador

Highway system
- Highways in Newfoundland and Labrador
← Route 341	→ Route 343

Route 342 in Newfoundland and Labrador leads from Route 341 in Lewisporte to Embree and then to Little Burnt Bay, all on the island of Newfoundland. The highway also acts as the main road in all three towns and links them together.

== Route description ==
Route 342 begins as Main Street in downtown Lewisporte at an intersection with Route 341 (Main Street/Premier Drive). The highway passes by Lewisporte's Marina as it heads north along the banks of Burnt Bay through neighbourhoods before leaving Lewisporte and passing through rural areas for several kilometres. Route 342 now passes through Embree as it begins following the Bay of Exploits. The highway continues north to enter Little Burnt Bay, where Route 342 comes to a dead after passing by that town's harbour.

== Major intersections ==
Location	km	mi	Destinations	Notes
Lewisporte	0.0	0.0	Route 341 (Main Street/Premier Drive) to Route 340 – Laurenceton, Twillingate	Southern terminus; provides access to Route 1 (TCH) via Route 340
Embree	10.0	6.2	Route 342 passes through Embree	
Little Burnt Bay	16.7	10.4	Dead End	Northern terminus
1.000 mi = 1.609 km; 1.000 km = 0.621 mi

== See also ==
- List of Newfoundland and Labrador highways
