= Lewisporte-Twillingate =

Provincial electoral district in Newfoundland and Labrador, Canada

Newfoundland and Labrador electoral district

Provincial electoral district
- Legislature: Newfoundland and Labrador House of Assembly
MHA
Mark Butt
Progressive Conservative
- District created: 2015
- First contested: 2015
- Last contested: 2025

Demographics
- Population (2011): 13,501
- Electors (2015): 10,366
- Area (km²): 1,725
- Census division: Division No. 8
- Census subdivision(s): Baytona, Birchy Bay, Campbellton, Comfort Cove-Newstead, Cottlesville, Crow Head, Embree, Lewisporte, Little Burnt Bay, Summerford, Twillingate

Lewisporte-Twillingate is a provincial electoral district in Newfoundland and Labrador, Canada, which is represented by one member in the Newfoundland and Labrador House of Assembly. It was contested for the first time in the 2015 provincial election.

The district was created following the 2015 redistribution and the elimination of the district of The Isles of Notre Dame and Lewisporte. The town of Lewisporte is the largest population centre in the district.

== Members of the House of Assembly ==
The district has elected the following members of the House of Assembly:

Assembly	Years	Member	Party
48th	2015–2019	Derek Bennett	Liberal
49th	2019–2021	Derek Bennett	Liberal
50th	2021–2025	Derek Bennett	Liberal
51st	2025–present	Mark Butt	Progressive Conservative

== Election results ==
Graph of election results (minor parties that never got 2% of the vote or did not run consistently are omitted) View source data.

2025 Newfoundland and Labrador general election
Party	Candidate	Votes	%	±%
Progressive Conservative	Mark Butt	2,570	49.30	+11.74
Liberal	Derek Bennett	2,552	48.95	-13.48
New Democratic	Steven Kent	76	1.46	
Independent	Stacy Coish	15	0.29	
Total valid votes		5,213		
Total rejected ballots				
Turnout				
Eligible voters				
Progressive Conservative gain from Liberal		Swing		+12.61

2021 Newfoundland and Labrador general election
Party	Candidate	Votes	%	±%
Liberal	Derek Bennett	2,593	62.44	+8.44
Progressive Conservative	Rhonda Lee Simms	1,560	37.56	-8.44
Total valid votes		4,153	99.50	
Total rejected ballots		21	0.50	
Turnout		4,174	41.06	
Eligible voters		10,166		
Liberal hold		Swing		+8.44
Source(s) "Officially Nominated Candidates General Election 2021" (PDF). Elections Newfoundland and Labrador. "NL Election 2021 (Unofficial Results)".

2019 Newfoundland and Labrador general election
Party	Candidate	Votes	%	±%
Liberal	Derek Bennett	3,190	54.0	
Progressive Conservative	Krista Freake	2,717	46.0	
Total valid votes				
Total rejected ballots				
Turnout				
Eligible voters				

2015 Newfoundland and Labrador general election
Party	Candidate	Votes	%	±%
Liberal	Derek Bennett	3,254	53.88	–
Progressive Conservative	Derrick Dalley	2,686	44.48	–
New Democratic	Hillary Bushell	99	1.64	–
Total valid votes		6,039	99.74	–
Total rejected ballots		16	0.26	–
Turnout		6,055	58.41	–
Eligible voters		10,366		
Liberal notional gain from Progressive Conservative		Swing		–
Source: Elections Newfoundland and Labrador

== See also ==
- List of Newfoundland and Labrador provincial electoral districts
- Canadian provincial electoral districts
