= Bear Cove =

Bear Cove may refer to:

- Bear Cove, Newfoundland and Labrador (disambiguation)
- Bear Cove, Nova Scotia (disambiguation)
