= Purcell's Harbour =

- Local service district / designated place
- Location of Purcell's Harbour Purcell's Harbour (Canada)
- Coordinates: 49°36′51.88″N 54°42′16.16″W
- Country: Canada
- Province: Newfoundland and Labrador
- Time zone: UTC−03:30 (NST)
  - Summer (DST): UTC−02:30 (NDT)
- Area code: 709

Purcell's Harbour is a local service district and designated place in the Canadian province of Newfoundland and Labrador. It is on the southern Twillingate island, about 4 km (2.5 mi) outside the town of Twillingate, near the community of Little Harbour.

== History ==
Purcell's Harbour was considered to be settled in the late 18th century, but no separate census was kept for individual communities within the area of Twillingate. The first time it was recorded separately was in 1911 when it had a population of 77.

== Geography ==
Purcell's Harbour is in Newfoundland within Subdivision I of Division No. 8. The community has a small natural harbour which opens up into Main Tickle, which separates Twillingate Island from New World Island.

== Demographics ==
As a designated place in the 2016 Census of Population conducted by Statistics Canada, Purcell's Harbour recorded a population of 59 living in 28 of its 33 total private dwellings, a change of 20.4% from its 2011 population of 49. With a land area of 1.43 km^{2} (0.55 sq mi), it had a population density of 41.3/km^{2} (106.9/sq mi) in 2016.

== Government ==
Purcell's Harbour is a local service district (LSD) that is governed by a committee responsible for the provision of certain services to the community. The chair of the LSD committee is Leo Anstey.

== See also ==
- Back Harbour
- Bayview, Newfoundland and Labrador
- Crow Head
- Durrell, Newfoundland and Labrador
- List of communities in Newfoundland and Labrador
- List of designated places in Newfoundland and Labrador
- List of local service districts in Newfoundland and Labrador
