= Canadian order of precedence =

Relative preeminence of officials for ceremonial purposes

The Canadian order of precedence is a ceremonial hierarchy of important positions within the governing institutions of Canada. It has no legal standing, but is used to dictate protocol.

The Department of Canadian Heritage issues the Table of Precedence for Canada. The Department of National Defence reproduces this Table, with the additional note that members of the royal family (other than the monarch) take precedence after the governor general.

The provinces and territories of Canada also have their own orders of precedence for events of a provincial or territorial nature. They serve the same purpose and are structured similarly, but place an emphasis on provincial or territorial offices.

All units of the Canadian Armed Forces also have an order of precedence that determines seniority; it often decides such matters as which unit forms up to the right (senior side) of other units on a ceremonial parade, or the order in which marches or calls are played at a mess dinner.

== List ==
1. Monarch of Canada—King Charles III (Note: While not formally listed in the official order of precedence, a footnote to the official list states that the sovereign should be accorded precedence immediately before the governor general.)
2. Governor General of Canada—Louise Arbour
3. Prime Minister of Canada—Mark Carney
4. Chief Justice of Canada—Richard Wagner
5. Former Governors General of Canada in order of their departure from office:
  1. Ed Schreyer (1979–1984)
  2. Adrienne Clarkson (1999–2005)
  3. Michaëlle Jean (2005–2010)
  4. David Johnston (2010–2017)
  5. Julie Payette (2017–2021)
  6. Mary Simon (2021-2026)
6. Widows of Governors General of Canada (as former viceregal consort of Canada):
  1. Diana Fowler LeBlanc, widow of Roméo LeBlanc
7. Former Prime Ministers of Canada in order of their first assumption of office:
  1. Joe Clark (1979–1980)
  2. Kim Campbell (1993)
  3. Jean Chrétien (1993–2003)
  4. Paul Martin (2003–2006)
  5. Stephen Harper (2006–2015)
  6. Justin Trudeau (2015–2025)
8. Former Chief Justices of Canada, in order of their appointment
  1. Beverly McLachlin (2000–2017)
9. Speaker of the Senate of Canada—Raymonde Gagné
10. Speaker of the House of Commons of Canada—Francis Scarpaleggia
11. Representatives to Canada of foreign governments
  1. Ambassadors and High Commissioners, in order of the presentation of their credentials
  2. Ministers Plenipotentiary
  3. Chargés d'affaires.
12. Members of the Canadian Ministry
  1. Members of the Cabinet:
    The Table of Precedence for Canada prescribes that order of precedence within this group be determined in order of appointment to the King's Privy Council for Canada with ties broken by order of election to the House or appointment to the Senate. However, the current Canadian Ministry opted to use an alternative order that is determined by the Prime Minister.
  2. Ministers of State
    In order of appointment to the King's Privy Council for Canada with ties broken by order of election to the House or appointment to the Senate.
13. Leader of His Majesty's Loyal Opposition—Pierre Poilievre
14. Lieutenant Governors of the provinces, in the order their province joined Confederation and by population at joining to break ties
  1. Lieutenant Governor of Ontario—Edith Dumont
  2. Lieutenant Governor of Quebec—Manon Jeannotte
  3. Lieutenant Governor of Nova Scotia—Mike Savage
  4. Lieutenant Governor of New Brunswick—Louise Imbeault
  5. Lieutenant Governor of Manitoba—Anita Neville
  6. Lieutenant Governor of British Columbia—Wendy Lisogar-Cocchia
  7. Lieutenant Governor of Prince Edward Island—Wassim Salamoun
  8. Lieutenant Governor of Saskatchewan—Bernadette McIntyre
  9. Lieutenant Governor of Alberta—Salma Lakhani
  10. Lieutenant Governor of Newfoundland and Labrador—Joan Marie Aylward
15. All other Members of the King's Privy Council for Canada in order with the date of their appointment to the Privy Council, but with precedence given to those who bear the title "Right Honourable" in accordance with the date of receiving the honorary title.
  1. List of current members of the King's Privy Council for Canada
16. Premiers of the provinces, in the order their province joined confederation and by population at joining to break ties
  1. Premier of Ontario—Doug Ford
  2. Premier of Quebec—Paul St-Pierre Plamondon
  3. Premier of Nova Scotia—Tim Houston
  4. Premier of New Brunswick—Susan Holt
  5. Premier of Manitoba—Wab Kinew
  6. Premier of British Columbia—David Eby
  7. Premier of Prince Edward Island—Bloyce Thompson
  8. Premier of Saskatchewan—Scott Moe
  9. Premier of Alberta—Danielle Smith
  10. Premier of Newfoundland and Labrador—John Hogan
17. Commissioners of the Territories
  1. Commissioner of the Northwest Territories—Gerald W. Kisoun
  2. Commissioner of Yukon—Adeline Webber
  3. Commissioner of Nunavut—Eva Aariak
18. Premiers of the Territories
  1. Premier of the Northwest Territories—R. J. Simpson
  2. Premier of Yukon—Currie Dixon
  3. Premier of Nunavut—P.J. Akeeagok
19. Religious leaders, equally, by seniority
  Limited to "senior Canadian representatives of faith communities having a significant presence in a relevant jurisdiction".
20. Puisne Judges of the Supreme Court
21. Superior court justices
  1. Chief Justice of the Federal Court of Appeal
  2. Chief Justice of the Federal Court
  3. Associate Chief Justice of the Federal Court
  4. Chief Justice of the Tax Court of Canada
  5. Associate Chief Justice of the Tax Court of Canada
  6. Chief Justices of the highest court of each province and territory in order of date of appointment as chief justice
    - Chief Justice of Ontario—Michael Tulloch
    - Chief Justice of Quebec—Manon Savard
    - Chief Justice of Nova Scotia
    - Chief Justice of New Brunswick—Marc Richard
    - Chief Justice of Manitoba—Marianne Rivoalen
    - Chief Justice of British Columbia and Yukon—Robert J. Bauman
    - Chief Justice of Prince Edward Island
    - Chief Justice of Saskatchewan—Robert W Leurer
    - Chief Justice of Alberta, the Northwest Territories, and Nunavut
    - Chief Justice of Newfoundland and Labrador—Deborah Fry
  7. Associate Chief Justices of the highest court of each province and territory in order of date of appointment as associate chief justice
    - Associate Chief Justice of Ontario
    - Associate Chief Justice of Quebec
    - Associate Chief Justice of Nova Scotia
    - Associate Chief Justice of New Brunswick
    - Associate Chief Justice of Manitoba
    - Associate Chief Justice of British Columbia and Yukon
    - Associate Chief Justice of Prince Edward Island
    - Associate Chief Justice of Saskatchewan
    - Associate Chief Justice of Alberta, the Northwest Territories, and Nunavut
    - Associate Chief Justice of Newfoundland and Labrador
  8. Chief Justices of other superior courts in order of appointment as chief justice
    - Chief Justice of the Ontario Superior Court of Justice
    - Chief Justice of the Superior Court of Quebec
    - Chief Justice of the Supreme Court of Nova Scotia
    - Chief Justice of the Court of King's Bench of New Brunswick
    - Chief Justice of the Court of King's Bench of Manitoba
    - Chief Justice of the Supreme Court of British Columbia
    - Chief Justice of the Trial Division, Supreme Court of Prince Edward Island
    - Chief Justice of the Court of King's Bench for Saskatchewan
    - Chief Justice of the Court of King's Bench of Alberta
    - Chief Justice of the Supreme Court of Newfoundland and Labrador
    - Chief Justice of the Supreme Court of the Northwest Territories
    - Chief Justice of the Supreme Court of Yukon
    - Chief Justice of the Nunavut Court of Justice
  9. Associate Chief Justices of other superior courts in order of appointment as associate chief justice
    - Associate Chief Justice of the Ontario Superior Court of Justice
    - Senior Family Judge of the Ontario Superior Court of Justice
    - Senior Associate Chief Justice of the Superior Court of Quebec
    - Associate Chief Justice of the Superior Court of Quebec
    - Associate Chief Justice of the Supreme Court of Nova Scotia
    - Associate Chief Justice of the Supreme Court of Nova Scotia (Family Division)
    - Associate Chief Justice of the Court of King's Bench of New Brunswick
    - Associate Chief Justice of the Court of King's Bench (General Division) of Manitoba
    - Associate Chief Justice of the Court of King's Bench (Family Division) of Manitoba
    - Associate Chief Justice of the Supreme Court of British Columbia
    - Associate Chief Justice of the Court of King's Bench for Saskatchewan
    - Associate Chief Justice of the Court of King's Bench of Alberta (Edmonton)
    - Associate Chief Justice of the Court of King's Bench of Alberta (Calgary)
    - Associate Chief Justice of the Supreme Court of Newfoundland and Labrador
  10. Federal and provincial superior court puisne justices
22. Senators
  See List of current Canadian senators
23. Members of the House of Commons
  See List of House members of the 45th Parliament of Canada
24. Consuls General of Countries Without Diplomatic Representation
25. Clerk of the Privy Council and Secretary to Cabinet—Michael Sabia
26. Chief of the Defence Staff—Jennie Carignan
27. Commissioner of the Royal Canadian Mounted Police—Michael Duheme
28. Speakers of the Legislative Assemblies of the Provinces and Territories
  1. Speaker of the Legislative Assembly of Ontario—Donna Skelly
  2. President of the National Assembly of Quebec—Nathalie Roy
  3. Speaker of the Nova Scotia House of Assembly—Karla MacFarlane
  4. Speaker of the Legislative Assembly of New Brunswick—Bill Oliver
  5. Speaker of the Legislative Assembly of Manitoba—Myrna Driedger
  6. Speaker of the Legislative Assembly of British Columbia—Raj Chouhan
  7. Speaker of the Legislative Assembly of Prince Edward Island—Colin LaVie
  8. Speaker of the Legislative Assembly of Saskatchewan—Randy Weekes
  9. Speaker of the Legislative Assembly of Alberta—Ric McIver
  10. Speaker of the Newfoundland and Labrador House of Assembly—Derek Bennett
  11. Speaker of the Legislative Assembly of the Northwest Territories—Shane Thompson
  12. Speaker of the Yukon Legislative Assembly—Jeremy Harper
  13. Speaker of the Legislative Assembly of Nunavut—Tony Akoak
29. Members of the Executive Councils of the Provinces and Territories
  - Members of the Executive Council of Ontario
  - Members of the Executive Council of Quebec
  - Members of the Executive Council of Nova Scotia
  - Members of the Executive Council of New Brunswick
  - Members of the Executive Council of Manitoba
  - Members of the Executive Council of British Columbia
  - Members of the Executive Council of Prince Edward Island
  - Members of the Executive Council of Saskatchewan
  - Members of the Executive Council of Alberta
  - Members of the Executive Council of Newfoundland and Labrador
  - Members of the Executive Council of the Northwest Territories
  - Members of the Executive Council of Yukon
  - Members of the Executive Council of Nunavut
30. Judges of Provincial and Territorial Courts
31. Members of the Legislative Assemblies of the Provinces and Territories
32. Chairperson of the Canadian Association of Former Parliamentarians

== See also ==
- Canadian order of precedence (decorations and medals)
- Canadian Forces order of precedence
- Politics of Canada
- Removal from the Order of Canada
