= Long Point Lighthouse =

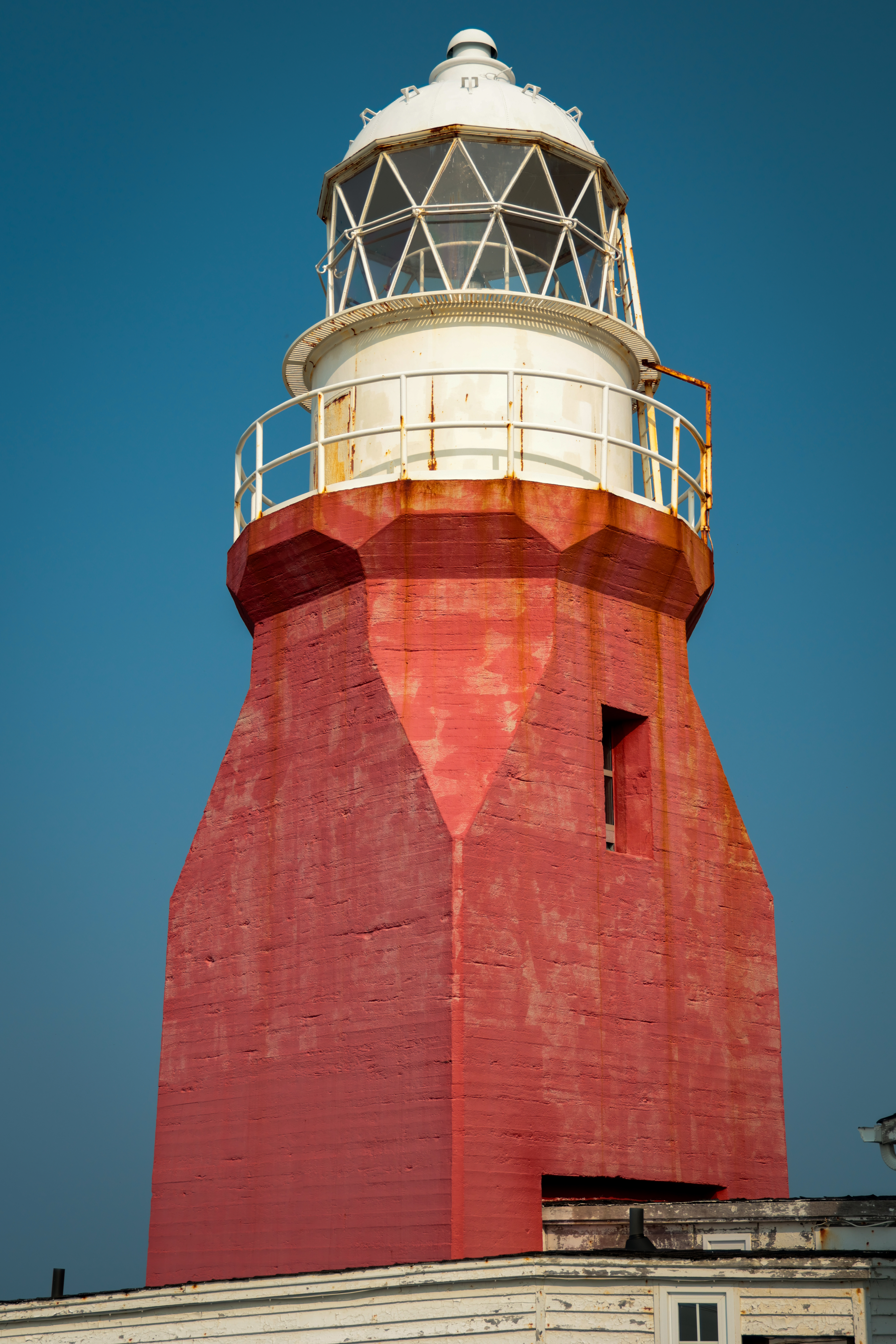
- Long Point Lighthouse
- Location: Crow Head; Twillingate Islands; Newfoundland and Labrador; Canada
- Coordinates: 49°41′16″N 54°48′00″W

Tower
- Constructed: 1876
- Construction: concrete-encased brick tower
- Height: 15 metres (49 ft)
- Shape: square base with octagonal upper tower
- Markings: red tower, white balcony and lantern
- Operator: Canadian Coast Guard
- Heritage: recognized federal heritage building of Canada, heritage lighthouse, municipal heritage site, registered heritage structure

Light
- Focal height: 101 metres (331 ft)
- Range: 16 nautical miles (30 km; 18 mi)
- Characteristic: Fl W 5s.

Long Point Lighthouse is an active Canadian lighthouse located outside Crow Head on North Twillingate Island off the northeast coast of Newfoundland. The lighthouse, completed in 1876, attracts thousands of tourists each year and is historic to the town of Twillingate.

== Keepers ==
- Samuel Roberts 1875–1893
- R.E. Roberts 1893–1896
- R.S. Roberts 1897–1912
- William Freeman 1913-1932?
- John and George Roberts 1932
- Edgar Sharpe 1952–1980
- Allan Roberts 1969–1984
- Barry Porter 1984-1988 and 2003
- Jack May 1988 – 2004

== See also ==
- List of lighthouses in Newfoundland and Labrador
- List of lighthouses in Canada
