= Six String Nation =

Acoustic guitar assembled from representative pieces of Canadian history and society

Six String Nation Guitar - Voyageur

Six String Nation Guitar - Voyageur

Six String Nation is a public art and history project conceived by Jowi Taylor and centred around a steel-string acoustic guitar built from a variety of artifacts collected by Taylor representing diverse cultures, communities, characters and events from every province and territory of Canada. The building of the guitar was commissioned from Nova Scotia luthier George Rizsanyi.

== History ==
The idea to build the guitar was conceived by Taylor in the months preceding the 1995 Quebec referendum on sovereignty after a chance encounter with Rizsanyi, who was then attempting to build guitars using wood from local sources rather than more conventional exotic woods. While the impending referendum focussed on the political relationship between the province of Quebec as a francophone minority and the Canadian federal government representing an anglophone majority, Taylor sought to represent additional stakeholders within the national debate including multicultural and indigenous communities as well as francophones living outside of Quebec. Over a period of eleven years, Taylor researched and gathered contributed materials for the guitar from every province and territory in Canada. A few materials were contributed directly by individuals to Rizsanyi. It was built by Rizsanyi in his workshop near Pinehurst, Nova Scotia, with assistance from Michael McConnell and fretboard inlay work by Sara Nasr. Work on the guitar was completed on June 15, 2006, and tested by musicians Dave MacIsaac of Cape Breton, Nova Scotia and Roger Howse of Newfoundland. Additional elements of metal, leather and fabric have subsequently been added to the case and strap.

The Six String Nation guitar made its debut on Canada Day 2006 on Parliament Hill in Ottawa at the invitation of the National Capital Commission. Following its official introduction, it was played by Stephen Fearing and subsequently during the show by Kyle Riabko, Michel Pagliaro, Colin James, Jean-Francois Breau and Amy Millan. Earlier in the day, it had been played on ancillary stages by Colin Linden, Tom Wilson, Popo Murigande, Joel Fafard and members of La Volée d'Castors. In subsequent years at the Canada Day main stage on Parliament Hill, the guitar was played by J. Knutson (2007), Ron Hynes (2008), Shane Yellowbird (2009), Wayne Lavallee (2010) and the guitarist accompanying Kardinal Offishall (2016). Over the years it has been played by hundreds of musicians - including Feist, Bruce Cockburn, Stompin' Tom Connors, Gordon Lightfoot, Rob Baker, Catherine MacLellan, the African Guitar Summit, K'naan and many others - at public and private events across Canada. The instrumental "Voyageur" by Don Ross from his "Upright and Locked Position" album (2012), was written for and composed on the Six String Nation guitar. In 2013 Jim Henman, a cofounder of Canada's April Wine, was asked to perform a few of his tunes on the Voyageur at his Toronto show and in 2019, an Ontario singer-songwriter composed and recorded an EP of 6 songs drawn from the stories embedded in the guitar, entitled "The Songs of Voyageur". Taylor and the Six String Nation guitar have appeared at festivals, schools, community, conference and corporate events in every province and territory of Canada.

The guitar officially received the nickname Voyageur - as suggested by Lt. Col. Susan Beharriell - at a ceremony launching the 2008 Festival du Voyageur in Winnipeg-St. Boniface.

In 2009, the guitar was part of the Un Paese a Sei Corde international guitar festival in Orta San Giulio, Italy, where it was played by Pino Forastiere and Davide Sgorlon.

In honour of the guitar, a fifty-cent coin was created by the Royal Canadian Mint in 2009. It is in the triangular shape of a guitar pick and features a hologram of the Six String Nation logo on the reverse set into a depiction of Voyageur's sound hole and rosette.

On December 11, 2015, Taylor was awarded the Meritorious Service Medal (Civilian Division) for his work on the project by Governor General David Johnston in a ceremony at Rideau Hall.

== Books ==
The origins and process of the project as well as the encounters with people across Canada were chronicled in a book by Taylor in 2009, "Six String Nation: 64 Pieces. 6 Strings. 1 Canada. 1 Guitar." (Douglas & Mcintyre publishers) accompanied by photos by Doug Nicholson and Sandor Fizli, including photos of the materials and construction process mostly by Fizli and a selection from among the tens of thousands of portraits of people holding Voyageur taken at events in all provinces and territories of Canada by Nicholson - an ongoing project.

Additionally, the project has been featured in a number of other published texts and workbooks including the grade 9 core French textbook "Tu Parles!" from R.K. Publishing and "Mathematics 10" for western Canada from McGraw-Hill Ryerson.

== Media ==
A proposed television special and series about the building of the guitar and its subsequent travels was aborted by CBC Television Arts and Entertainment part way through the development process just months before construction on the guitar began on April 30, 2006. At that point, CBC Newsworld producer Deborah Smith stepped in to propose a more modest project called "A Canadian Guitar", which played several times on the now defunct network.

Accompanying Jowi and the Six String Nation team on the journey to Haida Gwaii in February 2006 to obtain the wood from the Golden Spruce was Geoff Siskind, acting in the dual capacity of videographer and audio recordist, the latter for a documentary by renowned CBC radio documentarist Steve Wadhams. Wadhams' experimental audio documentary based on these and other recordings, along with interviews with Jowi and music commissioned from Don Ross, aired in 2007.

An interview on Shaw TV Vancouver's "Urban Rush" show on September 29, 2009 included performances by Barney Bentall.

The project was spoofed on the December 4, 2014 episode (#300193905) of CBC Radio's This Is That in a segment about the creation of a Canadian "unity shovel".

Taylor has appeared in dozens of local and national radio and television interviews about the project, most notably in two full length interviews on TVOntario's The Agenda with Steve Paikin on January 2, 2013 and November 8, 2016.

He was the guest on episode 70 of the Trailer Park Boys podcast, published on SwearNet.com on December 2, 2016. During the episode, Mike Smith, as the character "Bubbles", played the song "Liquor and Whores" on Voyageur.

== Materials ==
The guitar is made from 64 pieces of wood, bone, metal, stone and horn, representing a variety of cultures, communities, characters and events from every province and territory of Canada.

The guitar case was custom made for Six String Nation by Al Williams of Calton Cases Canada in Calgary, Alberta. The strap was made by Levy's Leathers of Winnipeg Manitoba. Additional pieces of significant material adorn both the case and the strap.

Voyageur Components
Province	Community	Description	Location(s) in Guitar Construction
Alberta	Brooks, Dinosaur Provincial Park	Wood from interior of John Ware's cabin.	Pick guard. Upper element of leaf motif.
Alberta	Edmonton	Top of hockey stick from Wayne Gretzky.	Pick guard. Stem. 4 of 4, L-R. Bridge pin (1 of original 6).
Alberta	Hand Hills Lake	Community Dance Hall floor board from Hand Hills Lake Stampede.	Top. Interior. Bridge plate.
Alberta	Kainah First Nation, Standoff	Ammolite carved in the shape of Blood Tribe Buffalo Skull symbol.	Back. Interior. Ornament.
British Columbia	near Dease Lake	Nephrite Jade from Jade West.	Headstock. Inlay.
British Columbia	near Port Clements, Haida Gwaii	Part of only material extracted from Kiidk'yaas, "The Golden Spruce".	Top.
British Columbia	Richmond	Red Cedar from Jack Uppal's Goldwood timber mill.	Back Int. solid lining on either side of end block.
British Columbia	Rossland	Competition ski from Olympic medalist Nancy Greene-Raine.	Back. Interior. Reinforcing strip #2 from top.
British Columbia	Sidney	Moulding from original era DeHavilland DHC-2 Beaver	Rosette. Elements #3 and #11, clockwise.
British Columbia	Victoria	Wood from original gateway to Canada's first Chinatown, Fan Tan Alley.	Top. Int. solid lining, left shoulder.
Manitoba	Gardenton	Wood from St. Michael's Orthodox Ukrainian Church.	Neck laminate. Rosette element #8, clockwise.
Manitoba	Gimli	Icelandic "Lucky Stone", Lake Winnipeg.	Fretboard inlay Fret #7.
Manitoba	St. Boniface	Beam from St. Boniface Museum, once schoolhouse to Louis Riel.	Back. Sides. Binding. Rosette, elements #5/13
New Brunswick	Atholville	Salvage from the Seven Years' War French Frigate, Machault.	Top. Bridge.
New Brunswick	Hartland	Wood from world's longest covered bridge.	Back Int. Reinforcing strip #4.
Newfoundland & Labrador	Cape Race	Wood from Cape Race Lighthouse motor cabinet.	Back Int. Heel brace.
Newfoundland & Labrador	Conception Bay	Red Ochre in tribute to Beothuk people.	Pick guard stain on side leaf element.
Newfoundland & Labrador	Nain	Labradorite feldspar.	Fretboard inlay on frets #3 and #9
Newfoundland & Labrador	Twillingate	Wood from Christmas Seal floating clinic.	Back Int. solid lining at L and R waist.
Nova Scotia	Halifax	Rafter from Pier 21 historic site.	Top. Interior. X brace.
Nova Scotia	Lunenburg	Decking from Bluenose II.	Neck laminate. Rosette. Interior top block and end block.
Nova Scotia	Lunenburg	Salvaged pew from St. John's Anglican Church.	Back Int. Back brace #4, reinforcing strip #5. Top int. lower bout solid lining.
Nova Scotia	Sydney, Cape Breton	Rail sample from Sydney Steel.	Fretboard inlay on fret #17.
Nova Scotia	Westphal	Wood from the Nova Scotia Home for Colored Children African Canadian Orphanage.	Top Int. fingerboard brace. Back int reinforcing strip #3.
Nunavut	Cambridge Bay (Iqaluktuuttiaq)	Muskox horn.	Rosette. Elements #4/12, clockwise.
Nunavut	Iqaluit	Whale baleen.	Rosette. Elements #2/10, clockwise.
Nunavut	Rankin Inlet (Kangiqliniq)	Walrus tusk.	Bridge pins (4 of original 6).
North West Territories	Fort Smith	Mammoth ivory from Dene carver Sonny MacDonald.	Headstock inlay - White element of 6SN logo execution, nut.
North West Territories	Great Bear Lake	Acasta Gneiss, world's oldest rock.	Fretboard inlay on fret #1, rightmost element.
North West Territories	Yellowknife	Wall piece from The Wildcat Cafe.	Pickguard. Stem. 2 of 4, L-R.
Ontario	Almonte	Kitchen rafter from James Naismith house.	Pick guard. Side leaf element surround.
Ontario	Cobalt	Silver from Beaver Mine.	Fretboard inlay on fret #1. Centre element.
Ontario	Niagara Falls	Wooden nickel made from Maid of the Mist II salvage.	Pick guard. Side leaf element inset.
Ontario	Ottawa	Copper from the roof of the Library of Parliament.	Fretboard inlay on fret #3. Rosette, double ring.
Ontario	Ottawa	Oak door frame from Parliament Centre Block.	Back. Spine laminate elements #1/5
Ontario	Ottawa	Wood from sideboard of Prime Minister Sir John A. Macdonald, Parliament Hill.	Top Int. Finger braces #1/2/3/4
Ontario	Pic River First Nation	Moose antler.	Fretboard inlay frame around Labradorite on 9th fret.
Ontario	Pic River First Nation	Pipe stone.	Headstock inlay Red element of 6SN logo execution.
Ontario	Sudbury	Nickel ingots from Inco.	Fretboard inlay on frets #12 and #15.
Ontario	Thunder Bay	Soup paddle from Finnish cooperative restaurant, The Hoito.	Side Int. Struts below waist, L/R.
Ontario	Toronto	Window frame from Lawren Harris' Group of Seven "Studio Building".	Top Int. solid lining on R shoulder. Back int. Back brace #1
Ontario	Toronto	Paul Henderson's hockey stick from Game 8, 1972 Summit Series.	Pick guard. Stem. 1 of 4, L-R. Bridge pin (1 of original 6)
Ontario	Toronto	Seat 69, Gallery section, Massey Hall.	Headstock + Rosette, elements #1/9, clockwise.
Prince Edward Island	Cavendish	Wood from the property where "Green Gables" author Lucy Maud Montgomery was raised by her grandparents.	Back. Interior. Reinforcing strip #1 from top.
Prince Edward Island	Charlottetown	Wood from office of J.R.'s Bar music venue founder Johnnie Reid.	Fretboard.
Prince Edward Island	Lennox Island First Nation	Handle of Mi'kmaq oyster shucking champion Joe Labobe's prized shucking knife.	Side. Seat for bottom strap post.
Prince Edward Island	Pinette	Wood from mallet belonging to "Canada Tree" sculptor Tyler Aspin.	Rosette. Elements #6/14, clockwise.
Prince Edward Island	Rustico	Wood from interior of Doucet House, PEI's oldest family dwelling, Acadian origin.	Back Int. Back brace #2. Top Int. solid lining at waist.
Quebec	Kuujjuaq, Nunavik	Caribou antler ulu carved by Charlene Watt.	Fretboard inlay on fret #5
Quebec	Montebello	Baseboard moulding from Manoir Papineau.	Neck laminate, centre strip.
Quebec	Montreal	Fairmount Bagel bakery shibba.	Back. Spine laminate elements #2/4
Quebec	Montreal	Gold from Maurice "Rocket" Richard's 1955-56 Stanley Cup ring.	Fretboard inlay on fret #9
Quebec	Montreal	Wood from Seat 10 Row G Section 321 of the old Montreal Forum.	Pick guard. Stem. 3 of 4, L-R.
Quebec	Montreal	Canoe paddle belonging to 15th and 17th Prime Minister, Pierre Elliot Trudeau.	Top Int. transverse brace. Truss rod access.
Quebec	Quebec City	Drapery pin from Walter S. Painter designed Theatre Capitole.	Side Int. Struts between upper bouts and waist, L/R.
Quebec	St. Armand	Slate from purported chapel roof built by slaves owned by American Philip Luke.	Bridge Pins Slate ground into powder colour for pin detail.
Saskatchewan	One Arrow First Nation, Duck Lake	Stone from monument to Almighty Voice aka. "Kisse-Manitou-Wayo" / "Shu-Kwe-weetam"	Fretboard inlay on fret #1, leftmost element.
Saskatchewan	Patuanak	Moose shin contributed by Don Freed and participants in his community music program.	Fretboard inlay on fret #3, frame.
Saskatchewan	Veregin	Wood from grain elevator built by Doukhobor exiles from Russia led by Peter Verigin.	Back. Spine. Centre strip. Rosette element #8.
Yukon	Dawson City	Flooring from cabin of author Jack London.	Back Int. solid lining at lower bout L/R.
Yukon	Dawson City/Pelly Crossing	Marten hide stretcher used by trapper/photo- documentarist J.J. Van Bibber.	Top Int. Tone bars #1/2. solid lining at lower bout L
Yukon	Dawson City, various	Wood from Yukon Rose river boat.	Back Int. solid lining on shoulders L/R
Yukon	Placer Gold Claim	Mastodon ivory.	Saddle.
Yukon	Qikiqtaruk (Herschel Island)	Wood from whaling station community house, the oldest wood-frame building in the Yukon.	Back Int. Back brace #3 Top Int. solid lining at bottom R.

Case Adornments
Province	Community	Description	Location(s) in Guitar Case
Alberta	Kainah First Nation	Sweetgrass braid gifted by Ramona Bighead, principal at Tatsikiisaapo'p Middle School.	Bed, top, under headstock pillow.
Manitoba/Ontario	Brochet/Toronto	Design by textile artist Holly Boileau made using "Rez Sisters" T-shirt fragment belonging to indigenous dancer René Highway, contributed by Highway's surviving partner, Micah Barnes.	Lid, main body below Cherry waistband
New Brunswick	St. Andrew's By-the-Sea	Chair Upholstery, Algonquin Resort, Walter S. Painter Wing, ca. 1910	Bed, sewn onto sidewall at bottom end.
North West Territories	Yellowknife	Eagle feather gifted by Gwich'in elder, musician and broadcaster, William Greenland.	Bed, affixed to bottom at right waist.
Ontario	Kingston	Engineers "Iron Ring"	Bed, compartment cover pull tab.
Ontario	Kirkland Lake	Skating costume and sport jacket worn by prolific painter and figure skating pioneer, World Champion and Olympic Medalist, Toller Cranston.	Lid, main body
Ontario	Kleinberg	Bow tie belonging to author, historian and broadcaster Pierre Berton.	Lid, neck.
Ontario	Orillia	Doily from Stephen Leacock House Museum at Brewery Bay.	Bed, main body.
Ontario	Sarnia	International Space Station Expedition 34/35 Mission Patch contributed by astronaut and ISS Commander Chris Hadfield.	Bed, main body.
Ontario	Stratford	Material from the original tent of the Stratford Theatre Festival ca. 1953	Bed, compartment cover.
Ontario	Toronto	"Sleeping Beauty" Bluebird costume of National Ballet of Canada prima ballerina Karen Kain ca. 1972	Lid, head. Bed, waist.
Ontario	Toronto	Collage of materials from Regent Park neighbourhood schools designed by students from Nelson Mandela Park Public School with designer Kessa Laxton.	Bed, headstock pillow.
Ontario	Toronto	Material from backdrop of Stuart McLean's Vinyl Cafe touring show.	Bed, main body, under Leacock doily.
Ontario	Windsor / Ohsweken	Leather webbing from 1971 to 1974 Windsor Warlocks lacrosse stick made by Six Nations stick maker Ennis Williams.	Bed, top, under headstock pillow.
Ontario	Wolf Island	Trousers donated by former coach and hockey broadcasting icon Don Cherry.	Lid, main body.
Prince Edward Island	Tyne Valley	Sweetgrass braid gifted by the Labobe family and friends in the oyster shucking community.	Bed, top, under headstock pillow.
Quebec	Quebec City	Carpet from the mosque at the CCIQ, site of the shooting on January 29, 2017, in which six people died and 19 were injured.	Lid, main body

Strap Adornments
Province	Community	Description	Location(s) in Guitar Construction
Alberta	Edmonton	Shoulder tile and cap badge donated by the Princess Patricia's Canadian Light Infantry - a regiment founded in 1914 on a grant from Andrew Gault.	Affixed at anterior shoulder level, top elements.
British Columbia	Vancouver	Material taken from a jersey (ca. late 1930s) of the Vancouver Asahi, a Japanese-Canadian baseball team also founded in 1914 and lasting until the 1941 internment.	Affixed on anterior near strap-lock device.
Newfoundland	St. John's	Shoulder tile and cap badge donated by the Royal Newfoundland Regiment, founded in 1795 and awarded the Royal designation in December 1949.	Affixed at anterior shoulder level, middle and lower elements.
Nova Scotia	Dartmouth	Materials gifted from the wardrobes of each of the main three characters of the Trailer Park Boys and woven together using the unique Atlantic rug hooking technique of the Grenfell Missions by artist Holly Boileau.	Affixed on anterior closest to strap-lock.
Ontario	Chatham	Wool from a cap belonging to Myles Neuts, a student who died in February 1998, six days after an attack by bullies at his school.	Affixed at posterior, mid-way.
Ontario	Toronto	Cowboy boot of singer-songwriter Taylor Mitchell, who died as the result of a coyote attack at Cape Breton Highlands National Park on October 27, 2009, at the age of 19.	Affixed at posterior over adjustment ribs.
Ontario	Toronto	Materials from Gord Downie's farewell "Man Machine Poem" tour wardrobe, consisting of small lamé swatches from each of seven suits designed by Izzy Camilleri, feather and felt from milliner Karyn Ruiz and heel and sole shoe leather by cobbler Jeff Churchill.	Feather, felt and lamé on anterior above Asahi jersey. Shoe leathers on posterior above Taylor Mitchell boot.

== Guitar Diagrams ==
Maps of the Six String Nation Guitar
The components of the guitar's fretboard

The components of the guitar's neck

The components of the front of the guitar

The components of the inside of the guitar's top side

The components of the back of the guitar

The components of the inside of the guitar's back side

The components of the inside joining edges of the guitar's top side

The components of the inside joining edges of the guitar's back side

The components of the bottom of the guitar
