= Peter Troake =

Canadian mariner (1908–1997)

Peter Troake, CM (June 16, 1908 – December 10, 1997) was a mariner, born in Durrell, Twillingate, Dominion of Newfoundland. He was captain of the MV Christmas Seal and recipient of the Order of Canada for his work in the improvement of welfare in Newfoundland through his service to the province of Newfoundland.

Troake served with the Newfoundland Forestry Unit in Scotland until 1942. He commanded many sealing vessels in the Newfoundland and Labrador sealing fishery amongst which is the SS Kyle. From 1950 to 1970 he commanded the MV Christmas Seal as it went from community to community with its mobile X-ray unit to test the population for tuberculosis. From 1971 to 1979 he commanded the Grenfell Association's Strathcona and was the first president of the Canadian Rescue Auxiliary, Newfoundland division. In 1992 he received an honorary doctorate from Memorial University of Newfoundland.

He married Hilda Bessie (Primmer) Troake (October 1, 1913 - February 26, 2001) and together they raised three children.

== See also ==
- List of people of Newfoundland and Labrador
