= Machault =

Machault or de Machault may refer to:

== Communes of France ==
- Machault, Ardennes, Ardennes département
- Machault, Seine-et-Marne, Seine-et-Marne département

== People ==
- Charles-François de Machault de Belmont (1640–1709), French naval officer and governor general of the French Antilles
- Guillaume de Machaut (or de Machault) (c. 1300–1377), French poet and composer
- Jean-Baptiste de Machault d'Arnouville (1701–1794), French statesman

== Other uses ==
- Fort Machault, a fort built by the French in 1754 in northwest Pennsylvania
- French frigate Machault (1757), a French frigate
- 14403 de Machault, an asteroid named after the poet
