= Walter Elliot =

Walter Elliot or Elliott may refer to:

- Walter Elliot (naturalist) (1803–1887), Scottish Indian civil servant and naturalist
- Walter Elliot (Scottish politician) (1888–1958), British MP
- Walter Elliot (English politician) (1910–1988), British MP
- Walter Elliott (sound editor) (1903–1984), American sound editor
- Walter Elliott (priest) (1842–1928), American Roman Catholic priest
- Walter John Elliot (1914–1979), Canadian Surgeon General
- Walt Elliot (1933–2020), Ontario politician

== Characters ==
- Baronet Walter Elliot, a fictional character from the 1817 Jane Austen novel Persuasion

== See also ==
- Walter B. Elliott causeway, in Newfoundland, Canada
