= CIFX-FM =

Former radio station in Lewisporte, Newfoundland, Canada

Defunct
- Lewisporte, Newfoundland; Canada
- Frequency: 93.7 MHz
- Branding: 93.7 Mix FM

Programming
- Format: Hot adult contemporary

Ownership
- Owner: Mix FM Inc.

History
- First air date: 2002
- Last air date: 2016

Technical information
- ERP: 50 watts

CIFX-FM was a Canadian radio station broadcasting on 93.7 FM in Lewisporte, Newfoundland. The station used to broadcast an adult contemporary/hot adult contemporary format branded as 93.7 Mix FM.

Approved by the CRTC in 2001, the station was launched in 2002 by local broadcaster Mix FM Inc.

As of 2016, CIFX went off the air.
