= Brown's Arm =

Human settlement in Newfoundland and Labrador, Canada

Coordinates: 49.254°N 55.170°W

Location of Brown's Arm in Newfoundland and Labrador

Brown's Arm is a local service district and designated place in the Canadian province of Newfoundland and Labrador

Brown's Arm (Community) is located in Newfoundland and Labrador (NL) in Canada. The satellite coordinates of Brown's Arm are: latitude 49°15'0"N and longitude 55°10'0"W

It is 11 km from Lewisporte

== Geography ==
Brown's Arm is in Newfoundland within Subdivision F of Division No. 8.

== Demographics ==
As a designated place in the 2016 Census of Population conducted by Statistics Canada, Brown's Arm recorded a population of 395 living in 148 of its 174 total private dwellings, a change of 29.9% from its 2011 population of 304. With a land area of 18.12 km^{2} (7.00 sq mi), it had a population density of 21.8/km^{2} (56.5/sq mi) in 2016.

== Government ==
Brown's Arm is a local service district (LSD) that is governed by a committee responsible for the provision of certain services to the community.

== See also ==
- List of communities in Newfoundland and Labrador
- List of designated places in Newfoundland and Labrador
- List of local service districts in Newfoundland and Labrador
