= New Chelsea-New Melbourne-Brownsdale-Sibley's Cove-Lead Cove =

New Chelsea-New Melbourne-Brownsdale- Sibley's Cove-Lead Cove
- Local service district / designated place
- Location in Newfoundland
- Coordinates: 48°02′00″N 53°10′00″W
- Country: Canada
- Province: Newfoundland and Labrador
- Census division: Division 1
- Census subdivisions: Subdivision F

Area
  - Total: 14.60 km^{2} (5.64 sq mi)

Population (2016)
  - Total: 494
  - Density: 34.5/km^{2} (89/sq mi)
- Time zone: UTC-3:30 (Newfoundland Time)
  - Summer (DST): UTC-2:30 (Newfoundland Daylight)
- Area code: 709

New Chelsea-New Melbourne-Brownsdale-Sibley's Cove-Lead Cove is a local service district and designated place in the Canadian province of Newfoundland and Labrador.

== Geography ==
New Chelsea-New Melbourne-Brownsdale-Sibley's Cove-Lead Cove is in Newfoundland within Subdivision F of Division No. 1. It consists of five unincorporated communities on the Trinity Bay side of the northern tip of the Bay de Verde Peninsula.

=== Communities ===
New Chelsea

New Melbourne

This small village was originally called Russells Cove, and circa 1864 housed some 16 families.

Brownsdale

Tradition has it that John Brown, who had migrated from Old Perlican around 1820, was the first settler in Brownsdale. He had established a sawmill there and was Brownsdale's first merchant. The original name of Brownsdale, Trinity Bay was Lance Cove South; the name was changed around 1910 to provide distinction from the other two Lance Coves on the island.

Brownsdale's first school was built in 1856 to accommodate twenty pupils. The village's first church was Wesleyan, constructed in 1870; the current church, the United Church of Brownsdale, was built in 1892. In 1958 a new high school was built and named for Newfoundland poet E. J. Pratt.

Sibley's Cove

Sibley's Cove is usually considered to include Torquay (pronounced tarquay), a cluster of houses on the East End of the cove. It is believed that the cove was probably named after a migrating fisherman.

- 1874 – Sibley’s Cove (combined with Lead Cove) first appears on the Census with a population of 61.
- 1884 – The population is listed as 93.
- 1891 – One vessel leaves Sibley’s Cove for the Labrador Fishery.
- 1895 – The first school is built and kept by Isaac March of Brownsdale.
- 1899 – A Methodist Chapel is built.
- 1942 – An Orange Hall is constructed.
- 1957 – A government wharf is constructed for the inshore fishermen.

Prior to 1871, the community had been renamed New Melbourne.

Lead Cove

Lead Cove may take its name from the lead-grey rock that surrounds the shallow cove. Tradition also tells that Lead Cove may have received its name from one of its earliest settler, Abraham Button, who felt that he had been "led" to this site from Old Perlican in his search for a place to settle.

- 1870 – First house is built by Abraham Button.
- 1874 – Census records eight families in Lead Cove and nearby Sibleys Cove.
- 1901 – The strong Methodist community of Lead Cove has 57 residents.
- 1916 – Cod liver oil factory, established by William Button, is the first commercial activity in Lead Cove.

=== Climate ===
Climate data for New Chelsea-New Melbourne-Brownsdale-Sibley's Cove-Lead Cove
Month	Jan	Feb	Mar	Apr	May	Jun	Jul	Aug	Sep	Oct	Nov	Dec	Year
Record high °C (°F)	15 (59)	14 (57)	17.2 (63.0)	21 (70)	26 (79)	28.9 (84.0)	30.6 (87.1)	29 (84)	26.1 (79.0)	22.8 (73.0)	21.1 (70.0)	15.6 (60.1)	30.6 (87.1)
Mean daily maximum °C (°F)	−0.2 (31.6)	−0.6 (30.9)	1.9 (35.4)	5.3 (41.5)	10.2 (50.4)	15.6 (60.1)	20.4 (68.7)	19.6 (67.3)	16 (61)	10.9 (51.6)	6.9 (44.4)	2.2 (36.0)	9 (48)
Daily mean °C (°F)	−3.4 (25.9)	−3.9 (25.0)	−1.3 (29.7)	2.2 (36.0)	6.3 (43.3)	11.1 (52.0)	15.8 (60.4)	15.8 (60.4)	12.5 (54.5)	7.8 (46.0)	4.1 (39.4)	−0.7 (30.7)	5.5 (41.9)
Mean daily minimum °C (°F)	−6.7 (19.9)	−7.3 (18.9)	−4.5 (23.9)	−1.1 (30.0)	2.4 (36.3)	6.6 (43.9)	11.1 (52.0)	11.9 (53.4)	8.9 (48.0)	4.8 (40.6)	1.3 (34.3)	−3.7 (25.3)	2 (36)
Record low °C (°F)	−20 (−4)	−25 (−13)	−23 (−9)	−10.6 (12.9)	−6.7 (19.9)	−4 (25)	0.6 (33.1)	0.6 (33.1)	−1.1 (30.0)	−3 (27)	−9.5 (14.9)	−19.4 (−2.9)	−25 (−13)
Average precipitation mm (inches)	118.9 (4.68)	106.6 (4.20)	97.7 (3.85)	81.4 (3.20)	82.9 (3.26)	87.1 (3.43)	63.5 (2.50)	103.9 (4.09)	97.8 (3.85)	121.2 (4.77)	113.5 (4.47)	107 (4.2)	1,181.5 (46.52)
Source: 1961-1990 Environment Canada

=== Geology ===
All of these communities are underlain by Precambrian bedrock of the Big Head Formation, chiefly gray to green arkose and siltstone. Soils are stony loam podzols and are mapped as Turk's Cove series except at Lead Cove which lies on the less well drained Old Perlican series.

== Demographics ==
As a designated place in the 2016 Census of Population conducted by Statistics Canada, New Chelsea-New Melbourne-Brownsdale-Sibley's Cove-Lead Cove recorded a population of 494 living in 221 of its 326 total private dwellings, a change of −1.8% from its 2011 population of 503. With a land area of 14.6 km^{2} (5.6 sq mi), it had a population density of 33.8/km^{2} (87.6/sq mi) in 2016.

== Government ==
New Chelsea-New Melbourne-Brownsdale-Sibley's Cove-Lead Cove is a local service district (LSD) that is governed by a committee responsible for the provision of certain services to the community. The chair of the LSD committee is Terry Button.

== See also ==
- List of communities in Newfoundland and Labrador
- List of designated places in Newfoundland and Labrador
- List of local service districts in Newfoundland and Labrador
