= Wild Cove =

Human settlement on the north island of Twillingate, Newfoundland and Labrador, Canada

- Local service district
- Interactive map of Wild Cove
- Coordinates: 49°40′07″N 54°47′00″W
- Country: Canada
- Province: Newfoundland and Labrador
- Region: Notre Dame Bay
- Time zone: UTC−3:30 (Newfoundland Time Zone)
  - Summer (DST): UTC−2:30 (Newfoundland Daylight Time)
- Area code: 709
- Highways: 340

Wild Cove is a small community on the north island of Twillingate, Newfoundland and Labrador. South of Wild Cove is Twillingate and north is Crow Head and the famous Long Point Lighthouse. Wild Cove is part of the Town of Twillingate.
