= MV Christmas Seal =

Canadian medical ship

History

United States
- Name: USCB Shearwater
- Namesake: Shearwater
- Builder: Casey Boat Building Company Inc., Fairhaven, Massachusetts
- Completed: March/April 1943
- Commissioned: 1943
- Decommissioned: 1947
- Identification: Hull number: P-102
- Fate: Sold, 10 September 1947

Canada
- Name: Christmas Seal
- Owner: Newfoundland Tuberculosis Association
- Acquired: 10 September 1947
- Nickname(s): The Ship of Health
- Fate: Sold, 1970; Caught fire and sank, 1976

General characteristics (as built)
- Class & type: Design 235 crash rescue boat
- Length: 104 ft (32 m)
- Propulsion: 3 × 625 hp (466 kW) Kermath V12 engines, 3 screws
- Speed: 18 knots (33 km/h; 21 mph)
- Complement: 12

MV Christmas Seal was a Canadian medical ship operating in Newfoundland from 1947 until 1970. Formerly a United States air-sea rescue vessel during World War II, she later served as an oceanographic research platform before sinking in 1976.

== Ship history ==
The vessel was built by the Casey Boat Building Company Inc., of Fairhaven, Massachusetts, in early 1943, as a 104-foot (32 m) Design 235 U.S. Army Air Forces crash rescue boat, and designated P-102. As the largest of the crash boats the Design 235 class were equipped with emergency medical facilities which could accommodate up to 23 people, which the crew of 12 were all cross-trained to operate. Under the name USCB Shearwater, the United States crash boat operated from the Naval Air Station Argentia until 10 September 1947, when she was purchased by the Newfoundland Tuberculosis Association for US$5,000 and converted into a floating clinic.

Since the purchase of the boat was funded by the sale of Christmas Seals, she was renamed MV Christmas Seal. From 1947 the vessel sailed to isolated outports on the coast of Newfoundland, screening residents for tuberculosis (TB), which was a leading cause of death on the island.

Under the command of Captain Peter Troake from 1950, the ship was fitted to provide chest X-rays, and also carried out vaccinations for TB and polio, and tested for diabetes. Doctors, nurses, technicians, and health educators staffed the vessel in addition to the operating crew The ship also provided general health education in the form of leaflets, talks and film shows, as well as providing emergency medical evacuations. A measure of the success of Christmas Seal can be seen in mortality rates; in 1947 there were 500 deaths from TB in the province, in 1958 it was 64. By 1970, the decline in rates of infection, and the improvements in road access on the island, meant that the services of Christmas Seal were no longer required. She was sold to a Lewisporte man who later chartered her to the Bedford Institute of Oceanography.

On the morning of 13 May 1976 Christmas Seal sailed from Halifax, Nova Scotia, but after three hours suffered an explosion in her engine room. The Canadian Coast Guard and several nearby ships responded to their mayday signal, and the crew of eight were rescued, with only one man slightly injured. The ship burned and eventually sank.

In 2006 wood salvaged from Christmas Seal was contributed to the construction of the Six String Nation project. Part of that material now serves as kerfing on the interior of Voyageur, the guitar at the heart of the project.

== See also ==
- List of World War II vessel types of the United States § Rescue Boats
- Crash boats of World War II
