= Little Harbour, Newfoundland and Labrador =

Coordinates: 49°37′40″N 54°42′40″W

Little Harbour is a drive-through community of 13 families on South Twillingate Island, off the north shore of the Canadian island of Newfoundland. It is located approximately 3 km south of Twillingate on Route 340. Little Harbour is known for a scenic atmosphere and authentic small-town feel.

Little Harbour has several wharfs, which were used by fishermen years ago, as well as a historic church that is no longer regularly used and a trail that leads to Lower Little Harbour, which can be walked, biked or drove on using a 4x4 vehicle. One of the main attractions in Lower Little Harbour is the Natural Arch. Icebergs attract tourists to the Little Harbour and Twillingate area each year.

== Church ==
The church's opening service took place on May 10, 1885 and was performed by Rev. H. Hatcher from Moreton's Harbour. The first baptism was on August 30, 1885 for Lilly Stuckless and Lilly Granville. Its first organ was installed in 1914, while the first bell was installed 10 years later in 1924. The church has a large rosette window on the rear facade.

== Wharf ==
The stage/wharf of Little Harbour is known as "Pardy's Stage", more formerly known as "William Pardy Stage". It is the oldest building in the community of Little Harbour. It was built in the late 1830s by William Pardy (1802-1872), a native of Leamington, England. He moved there in 1835, and married a native of Twillingate, Eleanor Young (1805-1881).

== See also ==
- Twillingate, Newfoundland and Labrador
- Purcell's Harbour, Newfoundland and Labrador
- Durrell, Newfoundland and Labrador
- Crow Head, Newfoundland and Labrador
- Bayview, Newfoundland and Labrador
- Back Harbour, Newfoundland and Labrador
