= Mark Butt =

Canadian politician

Mark Butt MHA
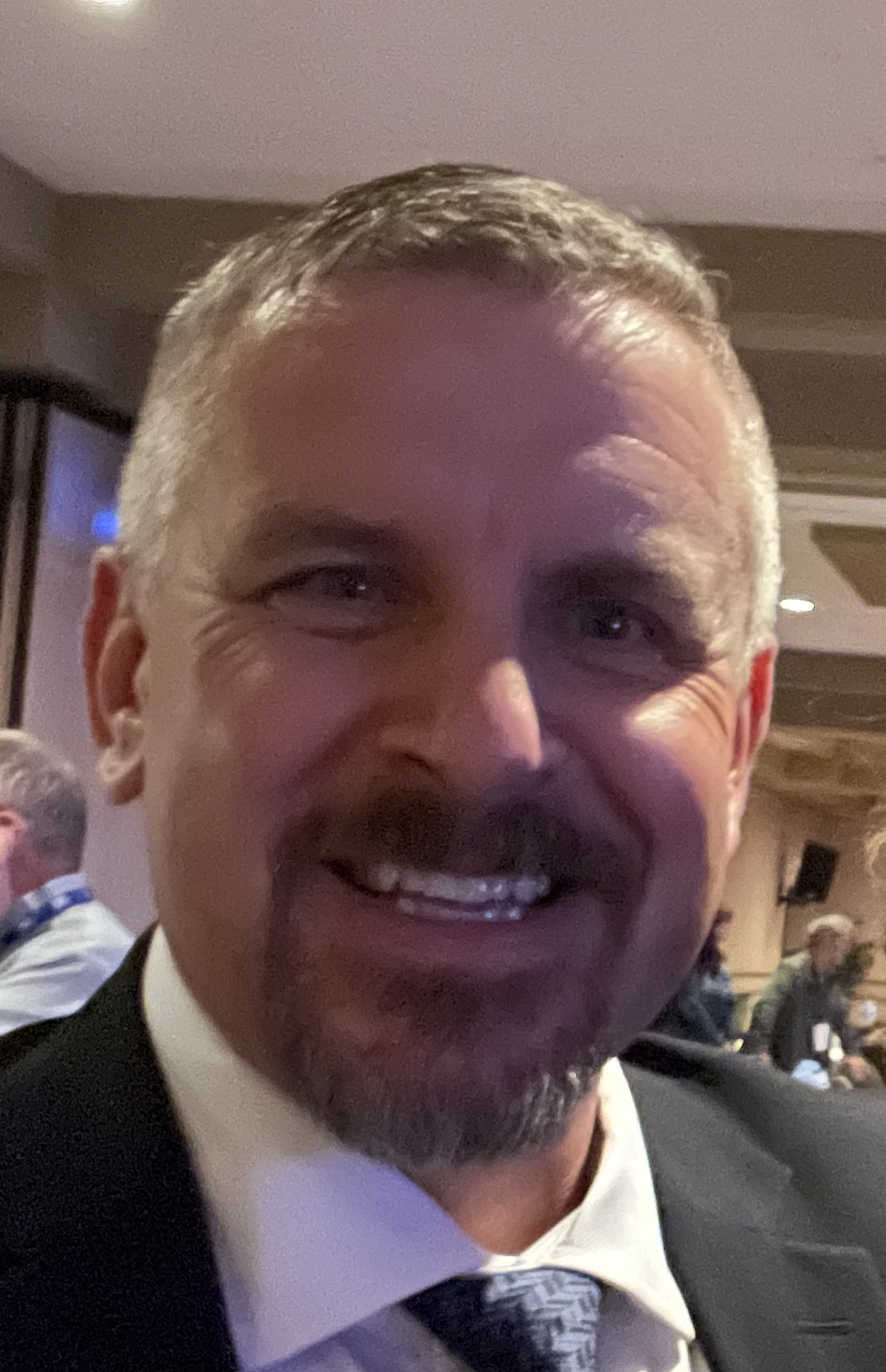
- Butt in 2026

Member of the Newfoundland and Labrador House of Assembly for Lewisporte-Twillingate
- Incumbent
- Assumed office October 14, 2025
- Preceded by: Derek Bennett

Personal details
- Born: Twillingate. Newfoundland, Canada
- Party: Progressive Conservative
- Spouse: Susan Butt (m. 2003)
- Children: 2
- Education: College of the North Atlantic

Mark Butt is a Canadian politician from Newfoundland and Labrador. He was elected to the Newfoundland and Labrador House of Assembly as the member for Lewisporte-Twillingate in the 2025 general election.

On September 17, 2026, Butt voted to approve the Churchill Falls Definitive Cooperation and Implementation Agreement (DCIA) in the House of Assembly along with the PC caucus.

== Background ==
Butt was born in Twillingate. Before entering politics, he served in the Canadian Armed Forces and completed a three year program at the College of the North Atlantic with a certificate in automotive technology.

== Election results ==
2025 Newfoundland and Labrador general election: Lewisporte-Twillingate
Party	Candidate	Votes	%	±%
Progressive Conservative	Mark Butt	2,570	49.30	+11.74
Liberal	Derek Bennett	2,552	48.95	-13.48
New Democratic	Steven Kent	76	1.46	
Independent	Stacy Coish	15	0.29	
Total valid votes		5,213		
Total rejected ballots				
Turnout				
Eligible voters				
Progressive Conservative gain from Liberal		Swing		+12.61
