= Twillingate =

Twillingate Toulinquet
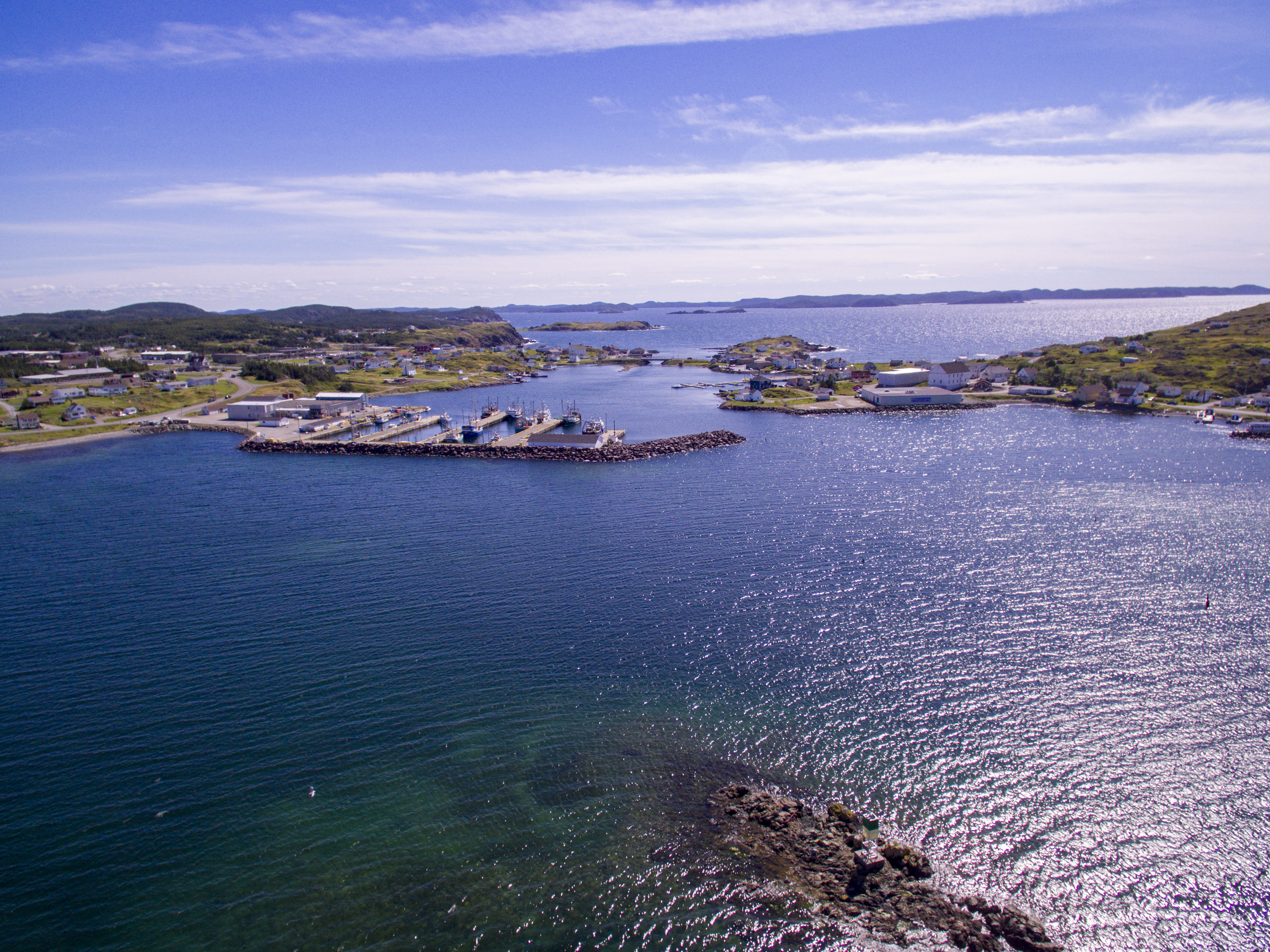
- A view of Twillingate
- Nickname: Iceberg Capital of the World
- Location of Twillingate in Newfoundland
- Coordinates: 49°38′40″N 54°44′37″W
- Country: Canada
- Province: Newfoundland and Labrador
- Census division: Division No. 8
- Incorporated: July 4th, 1965

Government
  - Mayor: Deborah Bourden
  - MHA: Mark Butt (Lewisporte-Twillingate)
  - MP: Clifford Small (Coast of Bays—Central—Notre Dame)

Area
  - Land: 25.74 km^{2} (9.94 sq mi)

Population (2021)
  - Total: 2,121
  - Density: 85.3/km^{2} (221/sq mi)
- Time zone: UTC-3:30 (Newfoundland Standard Time Zone)
  - Summer (DST): UTC-2:30 (Newfoundland Daylight Time)
- Postal Code: A0G 4M0
- Area code: 709
- Highways: Route 340
- Website: http://www.townoftwillingate.ca

Twillingate is a town of 2,121 people located on the Twillingate Islands ("Toulinquet") in Notre Dame Bay, off the north eastern shore of the island of Newfoundland in the province of Newfoundland and Labrador, Canada. The town is about 100 kilometres (62 mi) north of Lewisporte and Gander.

Incorporated on September 30, 1965, the town of Twillingate also incorporates smaller former localities such as Back Harbour, Bayview, Durrell, Gillard's Cove, Jenkins Cove, Manuel's Cove, and Wild Cove. The Twillingate Islands provide an excellent sheltered harbour and easy access to the rich fishing grounds nearby. Twillingate Island is connected to mainland Newfoundland via the Walter B. Elliott causeway as part of Route 340. The town is also one of the oldest ports on the island. It was a historic fishing community, but due to the collapse of the cod fishing industry, its economy now relies more on tourism.

== History ==
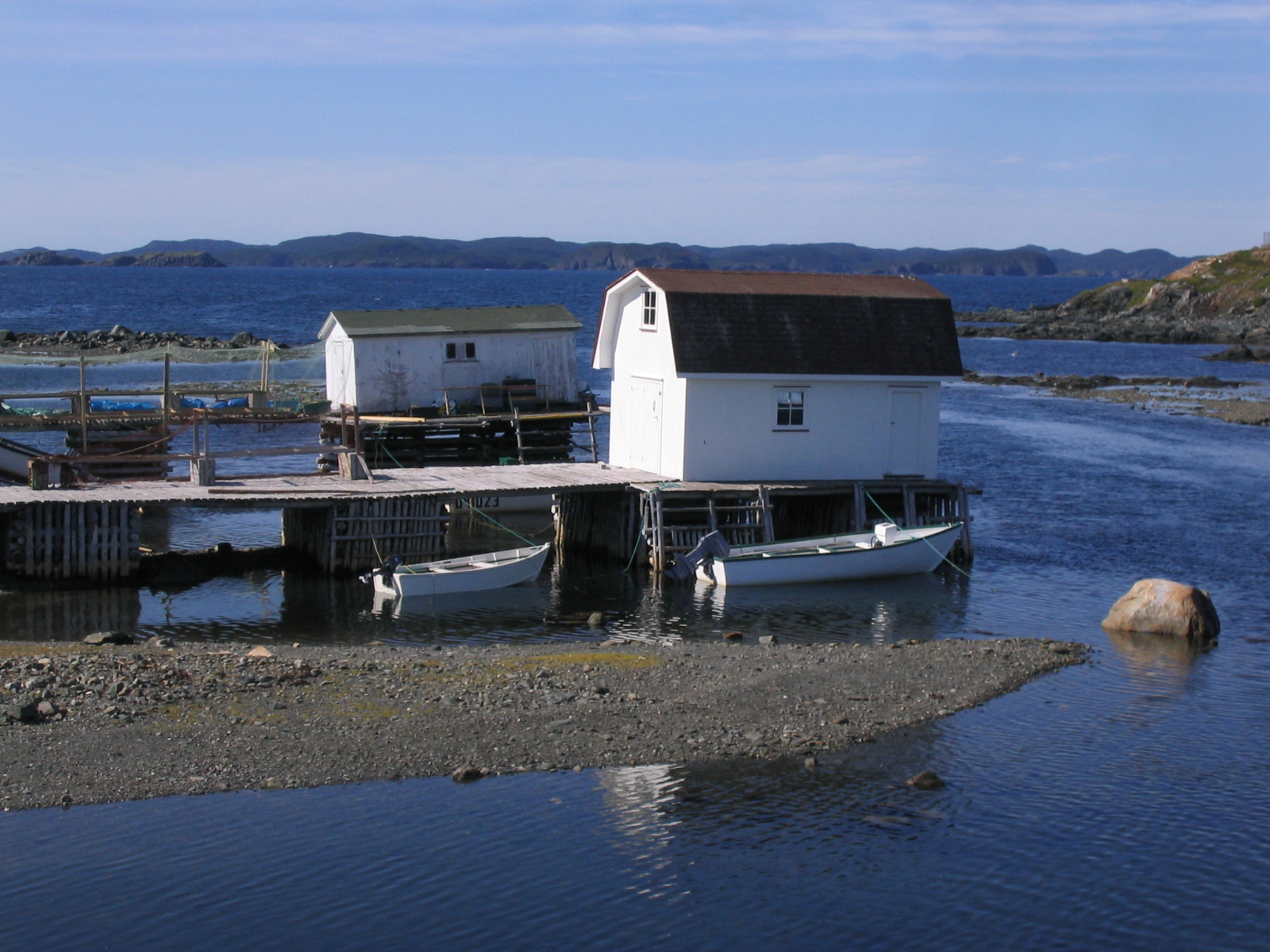
A newer looking wharf in the area

The earliest known people to inhabit the area were the Maritime Archaic, who occupied the area 3,500 years ago in roughly 1500 BC. The Maritime Archaic people were later supplanted by the Beothuk, and possibly the Dorset Inuit, who occupied the area until the arrival of European settlers.

The French had been fishing in the area possibly as early as 1500, but the first European settlers did not arrive until the 17th century. The settlers were mostly made up of fishermen and their families from the West Country in England. The native Beothuk managed to survive until the early 19th century in small numbers near Twillingate and the mouth of the Exploits River.

As the population grew, Twillingate became an important fishing community. It was a busy trade and service centre for Labrador and the northern shore fisheries for more than two centuries. One of the more prominent historical events that occurred in the history of Twillingate was the arrival of a local newspaper – the Twillingate Sun. The Sun served Twillingate and its local area from the 1880s until the 1950s. The Sun was a robust and professional newspaper that not only covered local and provincial news, but also international news as well. Lewisporte based newspaper the Pilot then served the area until going defunct in 2018. Since the Fisheries and Oceans Canada moratorium on fishing northern cod (see Endangered Species Controversies in Canada and Europe) was announced on July 2, 1992, followed shortly after by the collapse of the fishing industry, Twillingate has been forced to look to the tourist industry for income and has become a popular spot for visitors in the summer.

== Geography ==
Twillingate is easily accessed by Route 340 from Lewisporte if approaching from western Newfoundland or by Route 330 from Gander if approaching from eastern Newfoundland. The town of Twillingate is approximately 1.5 hours from Gander and about an hour from Lewisporte.

There are several very small fishing communities that can be found on Twillingate Island before reaching the main town, such as Black Duck Cove, Purcell's Harbour, and Little Harbour. The western portion of the island, a series of communities now amalgamated into Bayview is accessible via Bayview Street. The town of Twillingate is about 5 km (3.1 mi) from the Twillingate-New World Island causeway. When in the town, access to the northern island is provided by "Tickle Bridge" and the communities on the southern island can be accessed via the town's main road.

Route 340 runs through Twillingate as Toulinguet Street and Main Street. After turning left at the town's main intersection (Toulinguet and Main), Route 340 runs through northern portion of the town and continues through the surrounding communities on the northern island, Back Harbour, Paradise and Wild Cove, then after a 0.5 km stretch enters the town of Crow Head and continues to the Long Point Lighthouse.

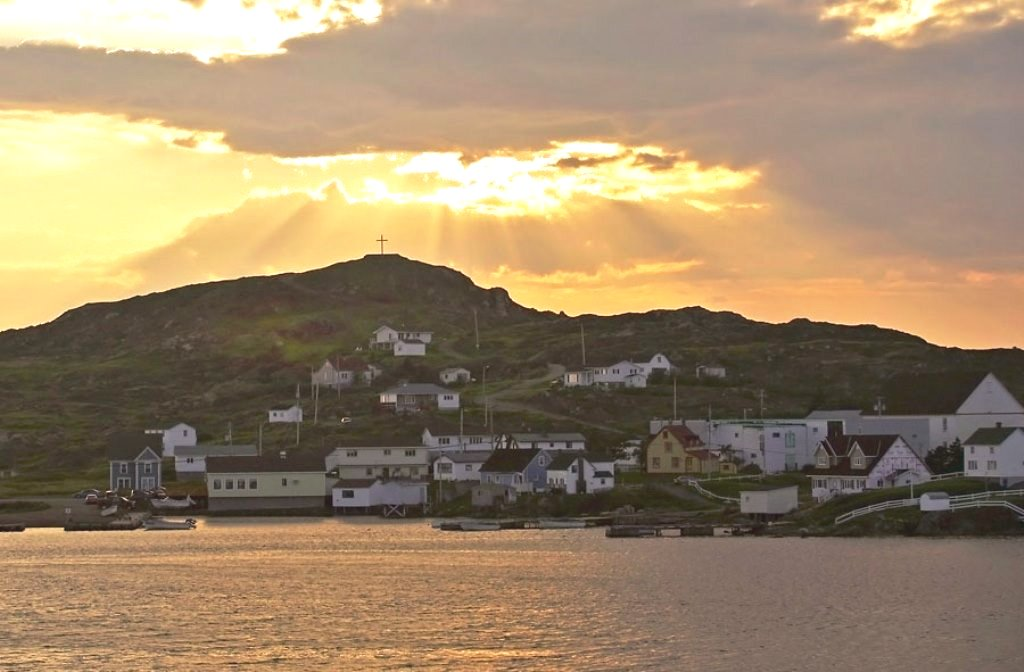
Twillingate harbour. 1997

The highest point in Twillingate can be reached via the "Top of Twillingate Walking Trail", which is located off Bayview Street. Elevation varies significantly throughout the town. The main southern and northern sides of the town in addition to the neighbourhoods of Wild Cove, Back Harbour, Hart's Cove, and portions of Bayview and Durrell are near sea level. Other parts of Durrell, Bayview and the central area of the town are situated on more elevated land.

The region is known for its scenic, rugged coastline and its quiet and friendly atmosphere. Icebergs can be seen around the coastline in the summer months. Twillingate is part of Iceberg Alley which stretches from the coast of Labrador to the southeast coast of the island of Newfoundland. Icebergs can be found most commonly in late May and early June.

=== Climate ===
Twillingate has a cool to cold, wet and very snowy humid continental climate with vast seasonal differences.

Climate data for Twillingate
Month	Jan	Feb	Mar	Apr	May	Jun	Jul	Aug	Sep	Oct	Nov	Dec	Year
Mean daily maximum °C (°F)	−2 (28)	−2 (28)	0 (32)	5 (41)	11 (52)	17 (63)	22 (72)	20 (68)	16 (61)	10 (50)	5 (41)	0 (32)	9 (48)
Mean daily minimum °C (°F)	−11 (12)	−11 (12)	−7 (19)	−2 (28)	2 (36)	6 (43)	11 (52)	11 (52)	6 (43)	2 (36)	−1 (30)	−7 (19)	0 (32)
Average precipitation mm (inches)	100 (3.9)	92 (3.6)	100 (3.9)	88 (3.5)	87 (3.4)	82 (3.2)	82 (3.2)	105 (4.1)	95 (3.7)	109 (4.3)	104 (4.1)	102 (4.0)	1,146 (45.1)
Source: The Weather Network

== Demographics ==
In the 2021 Census of Population conducted by Statistics Canada, Twillingate had a population of 2,121 living in 1,007 of its 1,302 total private dwellings, a change of −3.4% from its 2016 population of 2,196. With a land area of 25.6 km^{2} (9.9 sq mi), it had a population density of 82.9/km^{2} (214.6/sq mi) in 2021.

Data from the Statistics Canada 2006 census show that there were 2,448 residents living in Twillingate in 2006; a change of -6.2% from 2,611 in 2001. There were a total of 1,161 private dwellings. The town's land area is 25.74 square kilometres (9.94 sq mi) and has a population density of 95.1 inhabitants per square kilometre (246/sq mi).

As of the year 2006, there are 1,190 male residents and 1,255 female residents in Twillingate, with the median age of male residents at 46.6 and the median age of female residents at 48.8. The median age of the town's population is increasing, from 38.9 at the 1996 census to 43.8 in the 2001 census and to 48.0 in 2006, compared to the province as a whole at 41.7. This aging trend can be seen across age levels with those under 55 dropping from 2,175 people in 1996 to 1,785 in 2001 and 1,520 in 2006. At the same time those 65 and older increased from 780 people in 1996 to 825 in 2001 and 920 in 2006.

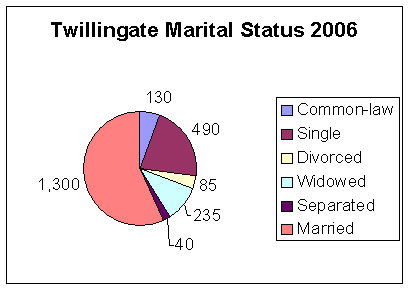
Marital status of Twillingate residents

Of the people living in Twillingate in 2006, 130 people were in a common-law relationship, 490 were single, 85 divorced, 235 were widowed, 40 separated and the majority, 1,300, were married.

In 2001, the majority of Twillingate residents - 2,405 of them - were Protestant, 60 were Catholic, 55 were Christian (unspecified) and 50 residents had no religious affiliation.

== Economy ==
Today, Twillingate's economy revolves primarily around careers in construction, logging and the tertiary sector, which involves providing services to the community. Because of the cod moratorium in 1992, fishing is not practised as much in the area, though some fishermen still catch crab, lobster and other aquatic species. The seal hunt is practised in Twillingate.

Tourism throughout the summer months is also a big part of the economy in the Twillingate area. The town is known as the "Iceberg Capital of the World" because of the scenery and icebergs that are seen in the spring months. The Fish, Fun and Folk Festival draws many tourists from across the world to the town each year and showcases local talent while economically helping the town and its people. The Long Point Lighthouse, found near Crow Head, is a popular tourist attraction, as are the humpback whales that can be seen in the Atlantic Ocean.

== Culture ==
Twillingate Museum
- Location: Twillingate, Newfoundland and Labrador, Canada
- Coordinates: 49.65554°N 54.776839°W
- Type: town museum
- Website: tmacs.ca/wp/

Twillingate residents value the area's culture and traditions. Historically, Twillingate was a prominent fishing community. However, due to the decline of the fishery industry, many residents had to find employment in other industries. The area is known for its rich culture.

Festivities and folk music are a big part of Twillingate culture. The Fish, Fun and Folk Festival is held annually at the end of July. The festival features local talent, dances, and entertainment from Newfoundland on Thursday and Friday nights. A parade, performances from the Split Peas, and a fireworks display are held towards the end of the festival. The festival draws in many tourists from around North America and around the world and exposes them to the culture of Twillingate. Songs like "I's the B'y", with the chorus "Fogo, Twillingate, Moreton's Harbour, all around the circle", and "Lukey's Boat", are traditional Newfoundland songs of the region that are still sung today at cultural events.

In the past, mummering was done in Twillingate around Christmas; however, today, it is not practised by as many people. A screech-in is performed annually at the Fish, Fun and Folk Festival; it is also done privately elsewhere. Tourists from outside Newfoundland and Labrador are classified "Honorary Newfoundlanders" after completing a ritual that involves kissing a fish, drinking a shot of Screech and repeating lines said by the host.

There are two museums in the area; the Twillingate Museum and the Durrell Museum located in nearby Durrell. The Twillingate Museum has a collection of Maritime Archaic artifacts that were collected from Back Harbour in 1967. The museum is affiliated with: CMA, CHIN, and Virtual Museum of Canada.

The town has a minor hockey team, called the Twillingate/New World Island Combines. It is part of Hockey Newfoundland and Labrador.

In 1990, the "Twillingate Fishery" was featured on season 26 of Land and Sea, a documentary series produced by the Canadian Broadcasting Corporation (CBNT) of St. John's. The community was also the setting for Anne Troake's 2005 documentary on her family's long involvement with the seal hunt, My Ancestors Were Rogues and Murderers.

On August 15, 2020, NHL Commissioner, Gary Bettman, announced Twillingate as the Kraft Hockeyville Canada Champion. As the winner, the George Hawkins Arena received a quarter of a million dollars in upgrades.

== Government and politics ==
The town hall for Twillingate is located on 25 Toulinquet Street. The current mayor of Twillingate is Deborah Bourden. Twillingate has historically been Liberal. The only exception to this was in 1982, when the Progressive Conservative Party won the majority of votes in the district. In 1996, Liberal Gerry Reid won the election in the Twillingate-Fogo district by 2,196 votes and in 1999, he won by 1,877 votes. In 2003, he defeated Progressive Conservative candidate Derrick Dalley, who was born in Twillingate, by 607 votes.

In 2007, the district voted Conservative for the second time in the history of Twillingate and Derrick Dalley became the MHA for The Isles of Notre Dame electoral district. Previous members of the House of Assembly for the district include William G. Adams. In 2015, the district went Liberal following redistricting. The current member of Parliament for the Coast of Bays—Central—Notre Dame riding is Clifford Small.

== Services ==
The town has two schools; Twillingate Island Elementary for kindergarten to Grade 6 and J.M. Olds Collegiate for Grade 7 to Grade 12. Both of the schools fall under the Newfoundland and Labrador English School District.

Medical services are provided by the small Notre Dame Bay Memorial Health Care Centre. Originally opened in 1924, it was later expanded. After its expansion, it was partially destroyed by fire. In 1976, the original 49-bed hospital was torn down and replaced by a 69-bed facility. Afterwards, due to budget measures, it was reduced to 46 beds.

Policing of the New World Island and Twillingate areas is provided by the Royal Canadian Mounted Police, Division B.

Twillingate has its own Fire Department, made possible by volunteers. The fire department is located in the Town Hall building, at the corner of Main Street and Blandford's Lane on the south side.

Telephone services were first supplied by Twillingate Telephone and Electric. It was later purchased, in 1951, by Canadian National Telecommunications. This company later formed Terra Nova Tel. In 1988, Terra Noval Tel was purchased by NewTel Communications, which was a holding company of NewTel Enterprises. In 1999, NewTel Enterprises merged with other companies. Today, telephone service is provided by Aliant. Aliant also provides DSL internet service to the community.

Eastlink, formerly operating as Persona Communications, provides both high speed internet and cable television to the community, as well as the cable-only House of Assembly Channel. The town receives CJON-TV, known as "NTV". NTV is rebroadcast as CJCN-TV from Norris Arm, as well as CBNT (CBC), which is rebroadcast as CBNAT from Grand Falls-Windsor.

== Notable people ==
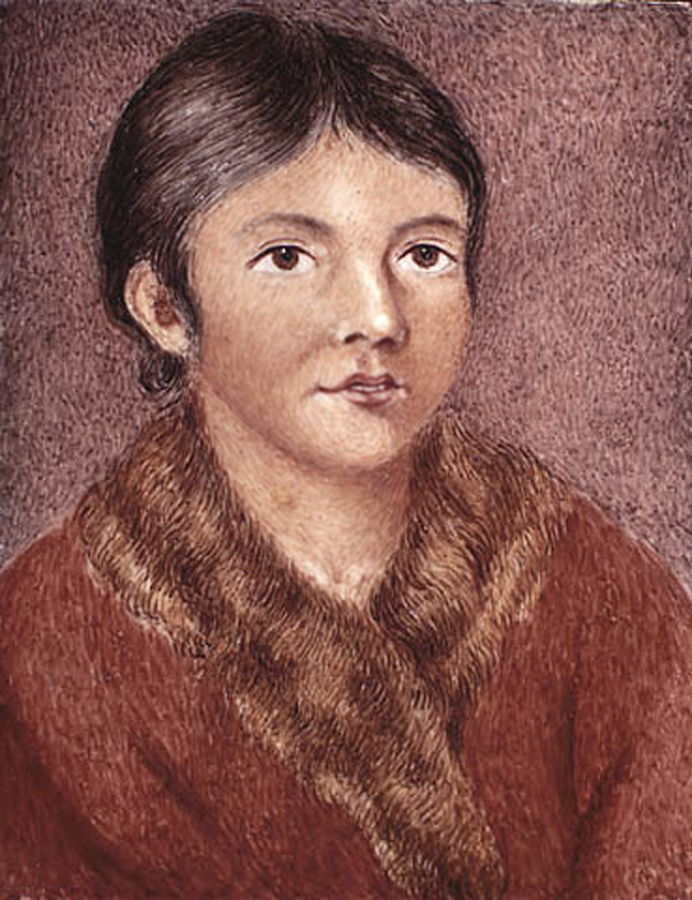
Portrait of Demasduwit (Mary March), by Lady Henrietta Hamilton, 1819, (Library and Archives Canada)

Notable people with connections to Twillingate include:

- William Epps Cormack (1796–1868), who set up the Beothuck Institution (now the Beothuk Institute) while in the town in 1827.
- John Day, a local policeman who, in 1825, was the first non-native settler at what is now Carmanville.
- Demasduit (c.1796–1820), one of the last known Beothuks on the island of Newfoundland was held captive at Twillingate and lived with the priest of the Church of England, Reverend John Leigh. She was also called Shendoreth and Waunathoake, but he renamed her Mary March, after the Blessed Virgin Mary and for the month in which she was kidnapped.
- Georgina Ann Stirling (1866/67–1935), was an opera singer who was born in Twillingate. She went by the stage name of Marie Toulinquet and became a world-renowned Prima donna soprano that played in opera houses throughout Europe and the United States. She was Newfoundland's first opera singer and later became known as the Nightingale of the North.
- Peter Troake (1908–1997), captain of the MV Christmas Seal and recipient of the Order of Canada, was born in Durrell, Twillingate.

== See also ==
- Bonavista—Twillingate
- Gander—Twillingate
- Lewisporte-Twillingate
- List of cities and towns in Newfoundland and Labrador
- List of communities in Newfoundland and Labrador
