= Back Harbour =

Community in Newfoundland and Labrador, Canada

Coordinates: 49°39′31″N 54°47′08″W

Back Harbour is a Canadian community located on the northern island of Twillingate in the province of Newfoundland and Labrador. It is part of the Town of Twillingate.

It was a farming and fishing village that had two stores and two schoolhouses in 1911. It had a population of 137 in 1956.

Back Harbour is located on the Northern Twillingate Island, near other towns including Wild Cove, Crow Head and Twillingate. The town basically consists of two main streets, along with some side streets. The town is completely residential, except for a trailer park and a cottage.

In 1967 a major archeological find was made in Back Harbour. Multiple items that had been used by the Maritime Archaic people were found at dwellings and burial sites. Among the items were stone tools and grindstones, as well as artifacts showing evidence of burnt offerings.

== See also ==
- Little Harbour, Newfoundland and Labrador
- Durrell, Newfoundland and Labrador
- Bayview, Newfoundland and Labrador
- List of communities in Newfoundland and Labrador
