= Susan Beharriell =

Canadian veteran and former intelligence officer

Lieutenant-Colonel Susan Beharriell (1954 – 1 December 2022) was a retired Canadian Air Force Intelligence officer. She was a pioneer within the Canadian Forces, facing and challenging discrimination against women.

Beharriell enlisted in the Canadian Armed Forces in 1973 at age 19, becoming part of the first group of women to undergo the same officer training regime as men. She was the first woman accepted to train as an Intelligence officer; she was first interviewed to determine whether she was "a bra-burning women's libber", and was told that if she failed no woman would ever again be allowed. She completed training while attending Queen's University in Ontario. Upon graduation in 1977 she was commissioned as a watch officer at the National Defence Intelligence Centre. She faced continued discrimination during training and postings. One instructor threatened to resign to protest having a woman student, but later apologised when she was confirmed, by his own audit of the results, as the top candidate. In 1982 she became the Base Intelligence officer at Cold Lake, Alberta, where she was told by male officers that she could not fly in those jets because her "female parts would be damaged". Nevertheless she recorded 80 hours as a passenger in fighter jets during her time training CF-18 pilots. She was transferred to Air Command Headquarters in Winnipeg in 1986, and underwent the Canadian Forces Command and Staff Course.

During the First Gulf War she was stationed in Germany at the Allied Air Force Central Europe, conducting intelligence analysis. She was seconded to the Privy Council Office from 1992 to 1994, after which she became the Command Intelligence officer for the Canadian Air Force. At the time of the September 11 attacks in 2001, she was the Deputy Commander of the Combined Intelligence Centre for NORAD/US Space Command Headquarters. She retired in 2008 from the Canadian Forces College at the rank of Lieutenant-Colonel.

Beharriell received the US Meritorious Service Medal, the Special Service Medal for service to NATO, the Canadian Decoration with 2 bars, and the Queen's Diamond Jubilee Medal, and was an Officer of the Order of Military Merit. She was a member of The Memory Project Speakers' Bureau.

Beharriell is also credited as the person who suggested the name Voyageur for the Six String Nation's guitar, a Canadian arts project created by Jowi Taylor.

Beharriell died on 1 December 2022 at the Sunnybrook Veterans Centre in Toronto, Ontario, Canada.
