= Bayview, Newfoundland and Labrador =

Group of fishing communities in Newfoundland and Labrador, Canada

Bayview
- Neighbourhood
- Interactive map of Bayview
- Coordinates: 49°36′50″N 54°44′37″W
- Country: Canada
- Province: Newfoundland and Labrador
- Town: Twillingate

Government
  - Type: Municipal government
  - Body: Twillingate Town Council
- Time zone: UTC−3:30 (Newfoundland Standard Time)
  - Summer (DST): UTC−2:30 (Newfoundland Daylight Time)
- Area code: 709

Bayview is an area in the town of Twillingate, Newfoundland and Labrador. It consists of three small fishing communities along the shore of South Twillingate Island. The communities within Bayview are called Bluff Head Cove, Gillard's Cove and Manuel's Cove. Mainly older residents of the community still refer to these places separately but street signs only read Bayview and Ragged Point.

Basically Bayview consists of one main road, formerly named Rink Road and recently changed to Bayview Street, along with many side streets such as Point Road, Gillard's Lane and Greenham's Point. There is one Salvation Army church in the community and a closed grocery store.

Bayview was an independent town but amalgamated with Twillingate in the 1990s.

== See also ==
- Little Harbour, Newfoundland and Labrador
- Purcell's Harbour, Newfoundland and Labrador
- Crow Head, Newfoundland and Labrador
- Back Harbour, Newfoundland and Labrador
- Durrell, Newfoundland and Labrador
