= Crow Head =

- Town
- Location of Crow Head Crow Head (Canada)
- Coordinates: 49°40′47″N 54°48′00″W
- Country: Canada
- Province: Newfoundland and Labrador
- Census division: 8

Government
  - Mayor: John Hamlyn
  - MHA: Derek Bennett (Lewisporte-Twillingate)
  - MP: Clifford Small (Coast of Bays—Central—Notre Dame)

Area
  - Land: 2.98 km^{2} (1.15 sq mi)

Population (2021)
  - Total: 156
  - Density: 59.4/km^{2} (154/sq mi)
- Time zone: UTC−03:30 (NST)
  - Summer (DST): UTC−02:30 (NDT)
- Postal Code: A0G 4M0
- Area code: 709
- Highways: Route 340

Crow Head is a small town located on the north island of Twillingate in Newfoundland and Labrador, Canada. It is home to the Long Point Lighthouse. Its only land border is with the Town of Twillingate, to the southeast.

As of 2021, there were 156 residents; this is down from its 2011 population of 203.

Its mayor, John Hamlyn, has been serving since 1963 and is the longest-serving mayor in Canada.

== Demographics ==
In the 2021 Census of Population conducted by Statistics Canada, Crow Head had a population of 156 living in 70 of its 106 total private dwellings, a change of −11.9% from its 2016 population of 177. With a land area of 3.03 km^{2} (1.17 sq mi), it had a population density of 51.5/km^{2} (133.3/sq mi) in 2021.

== See also ==
- Little Harbour, Newfoundland and Labrador
- Purcell's Harbour
- Durrell, Newfoundland and Labrador
- Back Harbour
