= Bear Cove, Nova Scotia =

Bear Cove, Nova Scotia may be the following communities in Nova Scotia:

- Bear Cove, Digby, Nova Scotia
- Bear Cove, Halifax, Nova Scotia
