= Durrell, Newfoundland and Labrador =

Community in Newfoundland and Labrador, Canada

Coordinates: 49°39′35″N 54°44′04″W

Durrell is a community on the southern island of Twillingate, Newfoundland and Labrador, Canada. The village is located off Route 340, named Durrell Street. It is a part of the Town of Twillingate.

A popular tourist destination in Durrell is the Durrell Museum, located on Museum Street. It features many different historical exhibits including a polar bear that once set foot on Twillingate island.

Durrell has one department store, which has groceries and hardware. Other stores are found in the nearby main town of Twillingate. There are no educational institutions in the village either, instead residents travel to Twillingate for elementary, middle and high school.

Durrell is split into many different "divisions", which aren't marked today but still are known by past and current residents of the area including Upper Jenkins Cove (mainly Upper Jenkins Cove Road; Gillesport Road area), Lower Jenkins Cove (Durrell Street) and Gillesport (Farmers Arm Road - Howlett's Road). There are many other side streets around the village.

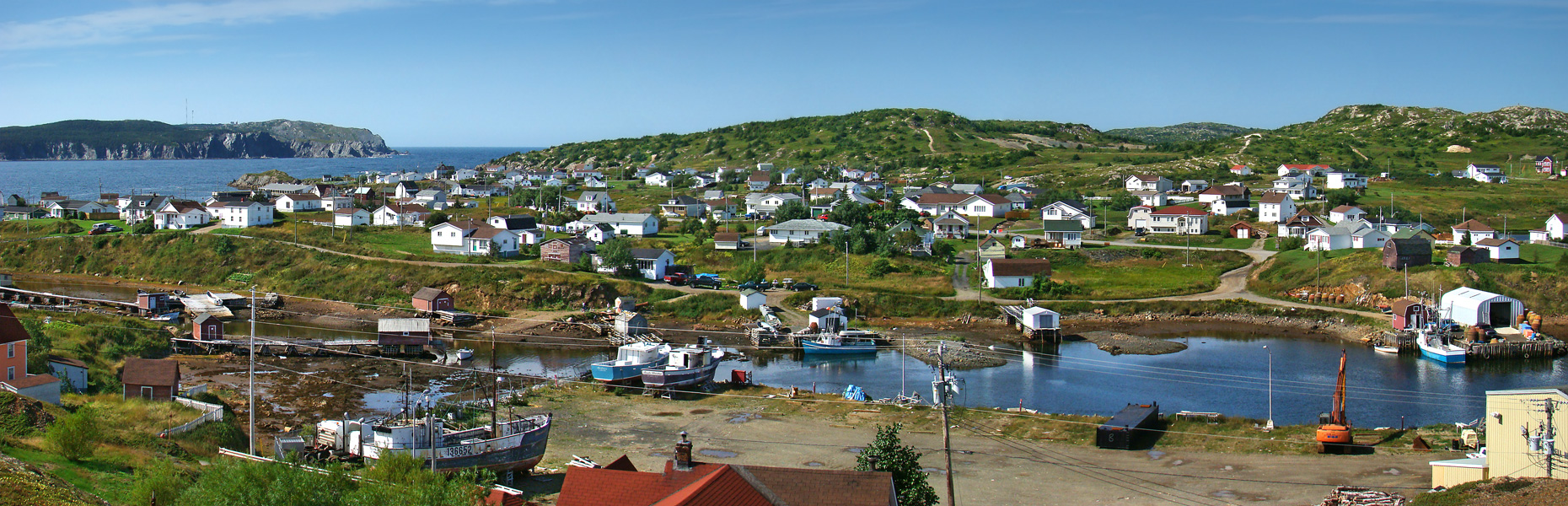
Panorama from the hill of the Durrell Museum

== See also ==
- Twillingate
- Crow Head
- Little Harbour
- Purcell's Harbour
- Bayview
- Back Harbour
