= Derek Bennett =

Derek Bennett may refer to:

- Derek Bennett (politician), Canadian politician
- Derek Bennett (director) (1930–2005), British television producer and director
- Derek Bennett (engineer) (1933–1978), British automobile engineer

== See also ==
- Derek Curtis-Bennett (1904–1956), British barrister
