= Laurenceton =

Human settlement in Canada

Coordinates: 49°12′N 55°17′W

Laurenceton is a local service district and designated place in the Canadian province of Newfoundland and Labrador. It is southwest of Lewisporte.

== Geography ==
Laurenceton is in Newfoundland within Subdivision F of Division No. 8.

== Demographics ==
As a designated place in the 2016 Census of Population conducted by Statistics Canada, Laurenceton recorded a population of 183 living in 79 of its 138 total private dwellings, a change of 2.8% from its 2011 population of 178. With a land area of 11.64 km^{2} (4.49 sq mi), it had a population density of 15.7/km^{2} (40.7/sq mi) in 2016.

== Government ==
Laurenceton is a local service district (LSD) that is governed by a committee responsible for the provision of certain services to the community. The chair of the LSD committee is Wayne Tetford.

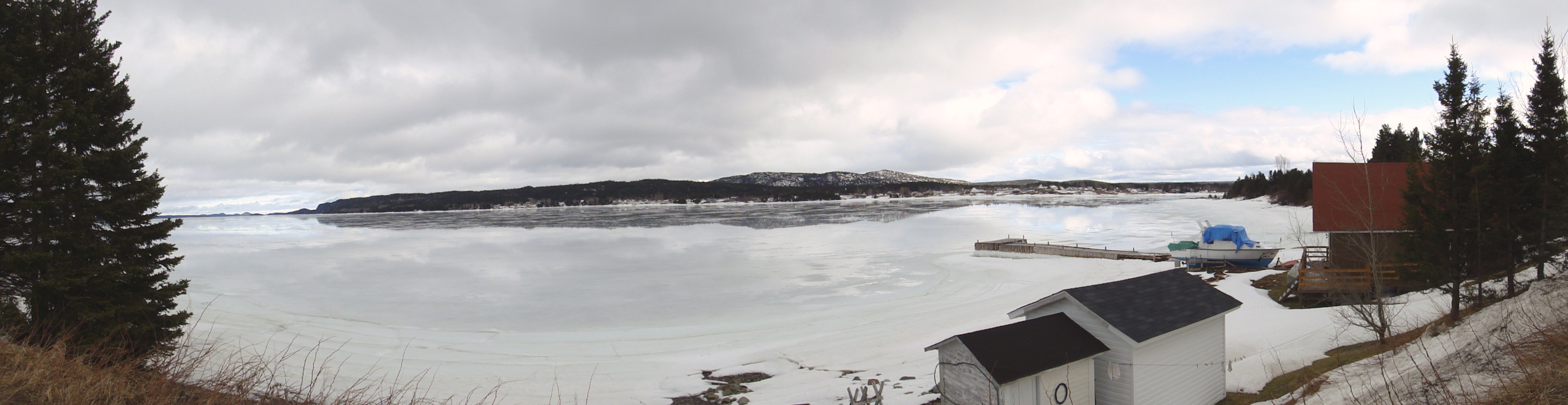
Laurenceton

== See also ==
- List of communities in Newfoundland and Labrador
- List of designated places in Newfoundland and Labrador
- List of local service districts in Newfoundland and Labrador
