= Division No. 1, Subdivision F, Newfoundland and Labrador =

Subdivision 1F
- Unorganized territory
- Division No. 1, Subdivision F
- Location within Newfoundland
- Country: Canada
- Province: Newfoundland and Labrador
- Census division: Division 1

Government
  - MHA: Riley Balsom (PC, Carbonear-Trinity-Bay de Verde)
  - MP: Jonathan Rowe (CON, Terra Nova-The Peninsulas)

Area
  - Land: 174.29 km^{2} (67.29 sq mi)

Population (2016)
  - Total: 548
  - Density: 3.1/km^{2} (8.0/sq mi)
- Time zone: UTC-3:30 (Newfoundland Time)
  - Summer (DST): UTC-2:30 (Newfoundland Daylight)

Division No. 1, Subdivision F is an unorganized subdivision on the Avalon Peninsula in Newfoundland and Labrador, Canada. It is in Division 1 and contains the unincorporated communities of New Chelsea-New Melbourne-Brownsdale-Sibley's Cove-Lead Cove and Turks Cove.

== Turks Cove ==
47°56′03.84″N 53°20′38.86″W Turks Cove was a settlement in Trinity District. The first postmistress was Bridget Moore. Other postmistresses include Anastasia Antle, and Alice Ryan, who was postmaster for 30 years up until 1972

Families in the cove include Coates, Antles, Ryans, Conways, Moores, Kellys and Samms. The community has never had more than 60 people, and dropped to 30 with job opportunities in Alberta.

The cove is semi-circular, with attractive scenery. Trees close to the ocean are small, but a kilometre or so inland there is enough for firewood and for house- and boat-building.

A few fishermen remained in the 1960s, but their methods could not keep up with the higher technology and larger vessels used by others. Fishing even up to 1972 was carried out with 16th-century methods because the poverty of the local people could not allow expansion and purchase of little more than cod traps.

The harbour is open and vulnerable to winds from the North West, the severest winds; stages, wharves and boats disappear after hurricanes or even squalls. Arctic ice invades each spring. Even after a disastrous Newfoundland Light and Power "Live Better Electrically" campaign, people continued to heat with wood. Electricity was eventually adopted; most houses have electric heat backing up wood.

There was a one-room Catholic school until 1964; it closed, and pupils were then bussed to the nearby town of Winterton.
