= French frigate Machault (1757) =

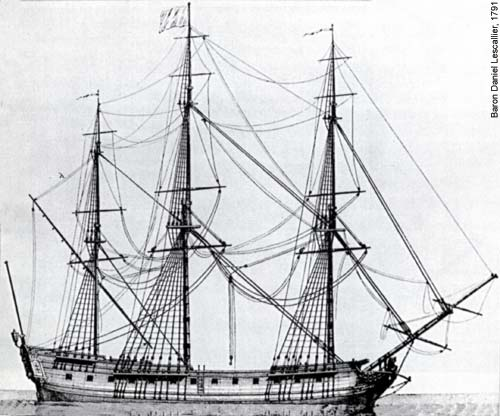
- Drawing of an 18th Century French Frigate

History

France
- Name: Machault
- Laid down: 1756
- Launched: 1757
- Fate: Sunk on 8 July 1760

General characteristics
- Class & type: 32-gun frigate
- Tons burthen: 500 port tonneaux
- Length: 123 ft 3 in (37.57 m) (gundeck)
- Beam: 33 ft 3 in (10.13 m)
- Depth of hold: 16 ft 5 in (5.00 m)
- Propulsion: Sails
- Sail plan: Full-rigged ship
- Armament: 32 guns of various weights of shot

Machault was a 32-gun ship of the French Navy, launched in 1757 at Bayonne, France.

She was built as a privateer and owned by Joseph Cadet, a general merchant and arms supplier in New France, and associate of the Intendant, Francois Bigot. She was hired by the French Navy in March 1759. Governor Vaudreuil had asked the French King to send supplies and re-enforcements. The French merchants acquiesced to this demand by sending five merchant ships to New France in 1760, escorted by Machault.

Her captain was François Chenard de la Giraudais. Machault took part in the Battle of Restigouche on 8 July 1760. She had 250–337 persons on board, of which 150 were sailors. She was sunk in the action, with her wreck later being explored and a number of artefacts salvaged.

In 2006, Atholville resident and historian Allan Muzzerall contributed small pieces of wood salvaged from the ship in the 1970s during excavation for a local mill to the Six String Nation project. This material now forms the bridge of Voyageur, the guitar at the heart of the project.

== See also ==
- Military of New France
