= Little Burnt Bay =

Coordinates: 49.333°N 55.083°W

- Town
- Interactive map of Little Burnt Bay
- Country: Canada
- Province: Newfoundland and Labrador

Population (2021)
  - Total: 238
- Time zone: UTC-3:30 (Newfoundland Time)
  - Summer (DST): UTC-2:30 (Newfoundland Daylight)
- Area code: 709
- Highways: Route 342

Little Burnt Bay is a small coastal community outside Embree and Lewisporte. In 2021, the population was 238, down 15.3 percent from 2016.

== Demographics ==
In the 2021 Census of Population conducted by Statistics Canada, Little Burnt Bay had a population of 238 living in 107 of its 138 total private dwellings, a change of −15.3% from its 2016 population of 281. With a land area of 8.46 km^{2} (3.27 sq mi), it had a population density of 28.1/km^{2} (72.9/sq mi) in 2021.

== See also ==
- List of communities in Newfoundland and Labrador
