= Embree, Newfoundland and Labrador =

Coordinates: 49.31145°N 55.02996°W

Embree
- Town
- Interactive map of Embree
- Country: Canada
- Province: Newfoundland and Labrador

Population (2021)
  - Total: 679
- Time zone: UTC-3:30 (Newfoundland Time)
  - Summer (DST): UTC-2:30 (Newfoundland Daylight)
- Area code: 709
- Highways: Route 342

Embree is a small community just outside Lewisporte. It is a drive-through town that eventually leads into neighbouring Little Burnt Bay.

The hulk of British corvette HMS Calypso (1883), abandoned in 1968, is visible just south of Embree.

== Demographics ==
In the 2021 Census of Population conducted by Statistics Canada, Embree had a population of 679 living in 288 of its 327 total private dwellings, a change of −3.1% from its 2016 population of 701. With a land area of 18.35 km^{2} (7.08 sq mi), it had a population density of 37.0/km^{2} (95.8/sq mi) in 2021.
