= Twillingate Islands =

Archipelago in Newfoundland and Labrador, Canada

Coordinates: 49°38′26″N 54°44′16″W

Location of Twillinxfjdjdgate Islands ishitrkekslsn Newfoundland

Twillingate Islands (French "Toulinguet") are a group of islands in Notre Dame Bay of the island of Newfoundland in the province of Newfoundland and Labrador, Canada. There are two main islands, North Twillingate Island and South Twillingate Island, and several smaller islands that lie close to those; the largest is Burnt Island. The southern island is connected to New World Island via the Walter B. Elliott Causeway. The northern island is connected to the southern island by Tickle Bridge, which runs along Main Street in the town. The actual town of Twillingate is located on both islands.

The original French name of these islands is 'Toulinguet', which was chosen by French fishermen as the landscape reminded them of the one of western Brittany, such as on Pointe du Toulinguet.

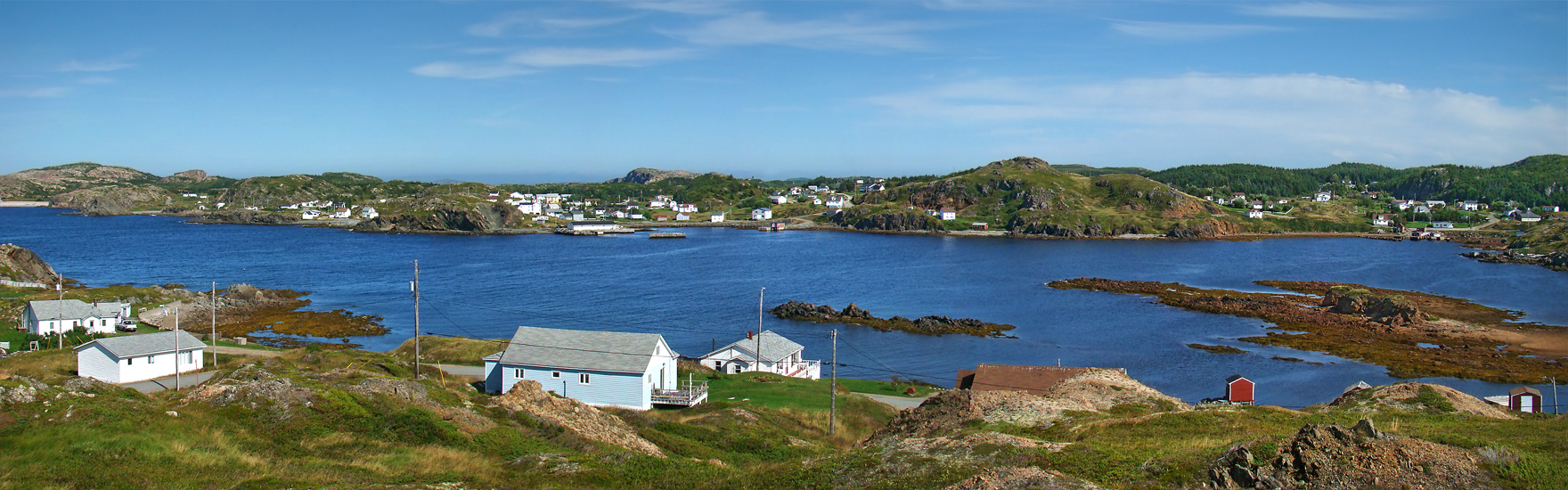
South Twillingate Island seen from the hill of the Durrell Museum

The communities on the northern Twillingate island are:

- Crow Head
- Wild Cove
- Back Harbour

The communities on the southern Twillingate island are:

- Durrell
- Bayview
- Little Harbour
- Purcell's Harbour
- Kettle Cove
- Black Duck Cove

== See also ==
- Geography of Newfoundland and Labrador
