= Walter B. Elliott Causeway =

Coordinates: 49.599°N 54.695°W

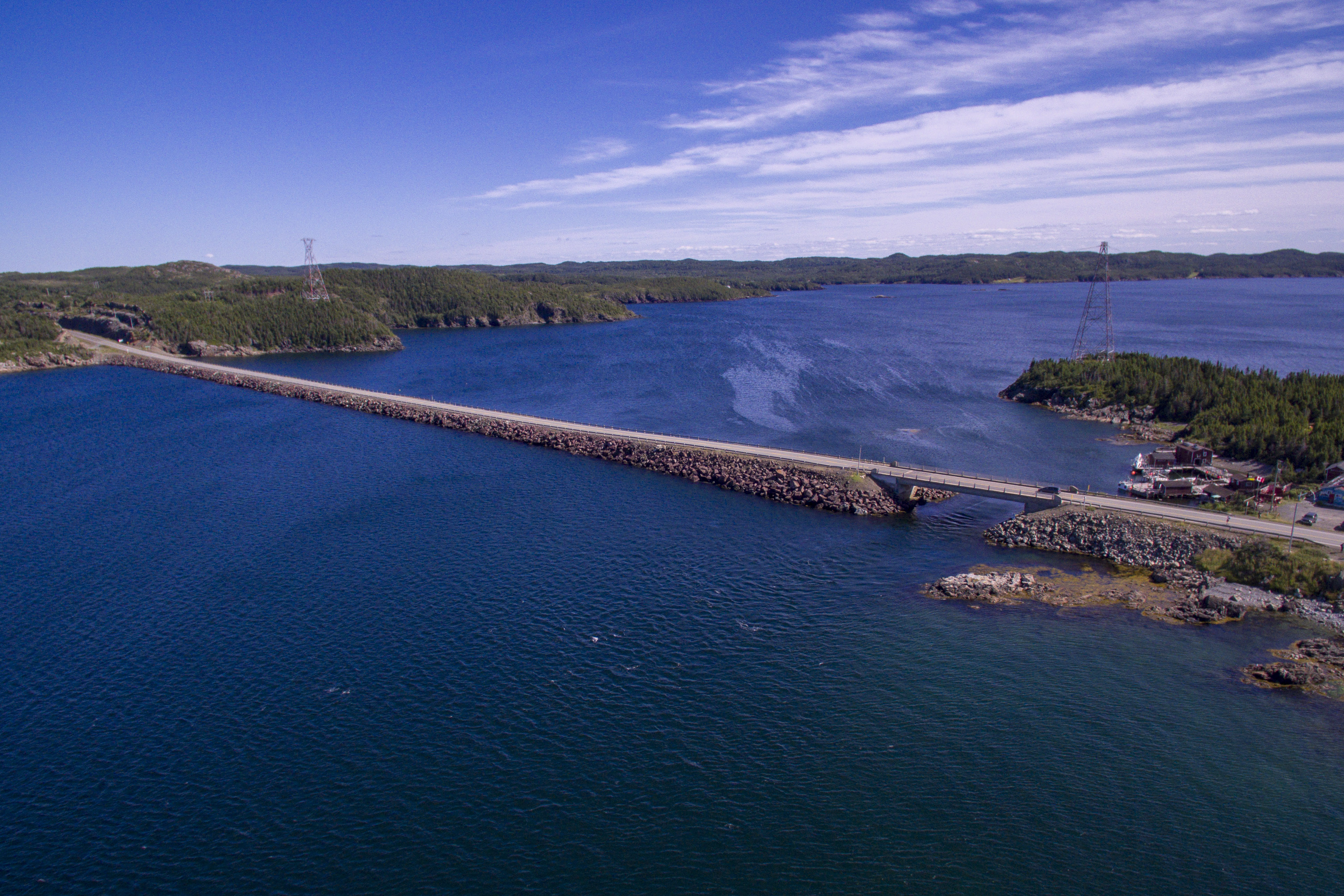
The Walter B. Elliott Causeway, connecting Twillingate Island with the Newfoundland Highway system.

The Walter B. Elliott Causeway is a causeway built in 1973 that connects South Twillingate Island with the rest of Newfoundland. It is part of Route 340 (Road to the Isles). Prior to the causeway, residents used a ferry service to travel between the Twillingate Islands and mainland Newfoundland.
