= Bear Cove, Newfoundland and Labrador =

Bear Cove can mean a number of places (outports) in Newfoundland and Labrador:

- Bear Cove (1), Newfoundland and Labrador is a cove and neighbourhood of Rocky Harbour
- Bear Cove (2), Newfoundland and Labrador is a village in on Baie Verte Peninsula
- Bear Cove (3), Newfoundland and Labrador is a village near Anchor Point on the Strait of Belle Isle.
- Bear Cove (4), Newfoundland and Labrador was a hamlet near Twillingate in 1911.
- Bear Cove (5), Newfoundland and Labrador was a hamlet near Twillingate in 1911.
- Bear Cove (6), Newfoundland and Labrador was a small fishing settlement in the St. George area in 1911. It had a population of 18 in 1911.
- Bear Cove (7), Newfoundland and Labrador was a small fishing settlement in the Ferryland area in 1911. It had a population of 12 in 1911.
- Bear Cove (8), Newfoundland and Labrador was in St. John's west.
- Bear Cove (9), Newfoundland and Labrador was a small place near LaPoile in 1864.

== See also ==
- List of communities in Newfoundland and Labrador
