= Derek Bennett (politician) =

Canadian politician

The Honourable Derek Bennett
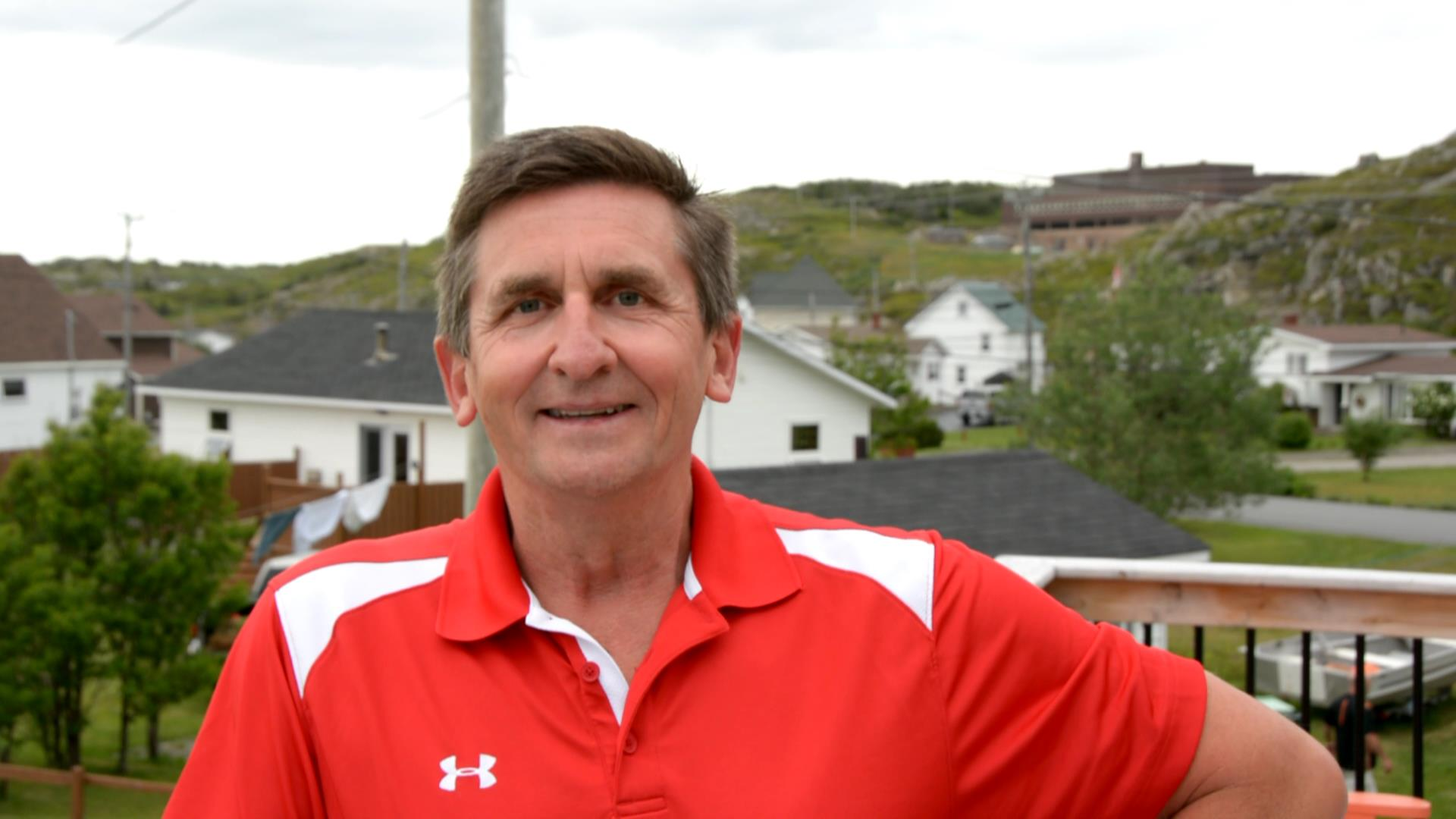

44th Speaker of the Newfoundland and Labrador House of Assembly
- In office April 12, 2021 – October 14, 2025
- Preceded by: Scott Reid
- Succeeded by: Paul Lane

Minister of Environment, Climate Change, and Municipalities
- In office August 19, 2020 – April 8, 2021
- Premier: Andrew Furey
- Preceded by: Derrick Bragg
- Succeeded by: position abolished

Member of the Newfoundland and Labrador House of Assembly for Lewisporte-Twillingate
- In office November 30, 2015 – October 14, 2025
- Preceded by: Riding Established
- Succeeded by: Mark Butt

Personal details
- Party: Liberal

Derek John Bennett is a Canadian politician, who served in the Newfoundland and Labrador House of Assembly from 2015 to 2025. Bennett was first elected in the 2015 provincial election. He represented the electoral district of Lewisporte-Twillingate as a member of the Liberal Party.

He was re-elected in the 2019 provincial election.

Bennett was promoted to cabinet on August 19, 2020 as provincial Minister of Environment, Climate Change, and Municipalities.

He was re-elected in the 2021 provincial election. He was dropped from Cabinet in April 2021. Bennett was elected Speaker of the Newfoundland and Labrador House of Assembly on April 12, 2021, defeating 4 other candidates.

Bennett narrowly lost his seat in the 2025 provincial election. On October 24, Bennett filed for a recount with the Supreme Court of Newfoundland and Labrador. On November 14, Supreme Court Justice Alphonsus Faour denied the recount.

== Electoral record ==
2025 Newfoundland and Labrador general election: Lewisporte-Twillingate
Party	Candidate	Votes	%	±%
Progressive Conservative	Mark Butt	2,570	49.30	+11.74
Liberal	Derek Bennett	2,552	48.95	-13.48
New Democratic	Steven Kent	76	1.46	
Independent	Stacy Coish	15	0.29	
Total valid votes		5,213		
Total rejected ballots				
Turnout				
Eligible voters				
Progressive Conservative gain from Liberal		Swing		+12.61

2021 Newfoundland and Labrador general election: Lewisporte-Twillingate
Party	Candidate	Votes	%	±%
Liberal	Derek Bennett	2,593	62.44	+8.44
Progressive Conservative	Rhonda Lee Simms	1,560	37.56	-8.44
Total valid votes		4,153	99.50	
Total rejected ballots		21	0.50	
Turnout		4,174	41.06	
Eligible voters		10,166		
Liberal hold		Swing		+8.44
Source(s) "Officially Nominated Candidates General Election 2021" (PDF). Elections Newfoundland and Labrador. "NL Election 2021 (Unofficial Results)".

2019 Newfoundland and Labrador general election
Party	Candidate	Votes	%	±%
Liberal	Derek Bennett	3,190	54.0	
Progressive Conservative	Krista Freake	2,717	46.0	
Total valid votes				
Total rejected ballots				
Turnout				
Eligible voters				

2015 Newfoundland and Labrador general election
Party	Candidate	Votes	%	±%
Liberal	Derek Bennett	3,254	53.88	–
Progressive Conservative	Derrick Dalley	2,686	44.48	–
New Democratic	Hillary Bushell	99	1.64	–
Total valid votes		6,039	99.74	–
Total rejected ballots		16	0.26	–
Turnout		6,055	58.41	–
Eligible voters		10,366		
Liberal notional gain from Progressive Conservative		Swing		–
Source: Elections Newfoundland and Labrador
