= Burnt Bay =

Coordinates: 49°22′07″N 55°09′00″W

Location of Burnt Bay in Newfoundland

Burnt Bay is a small bay in the northeast of Newfoundland. It opens on to the Bay of Exploits and Notre Dame Bay to the north.
