= Lewisporte =

- Town
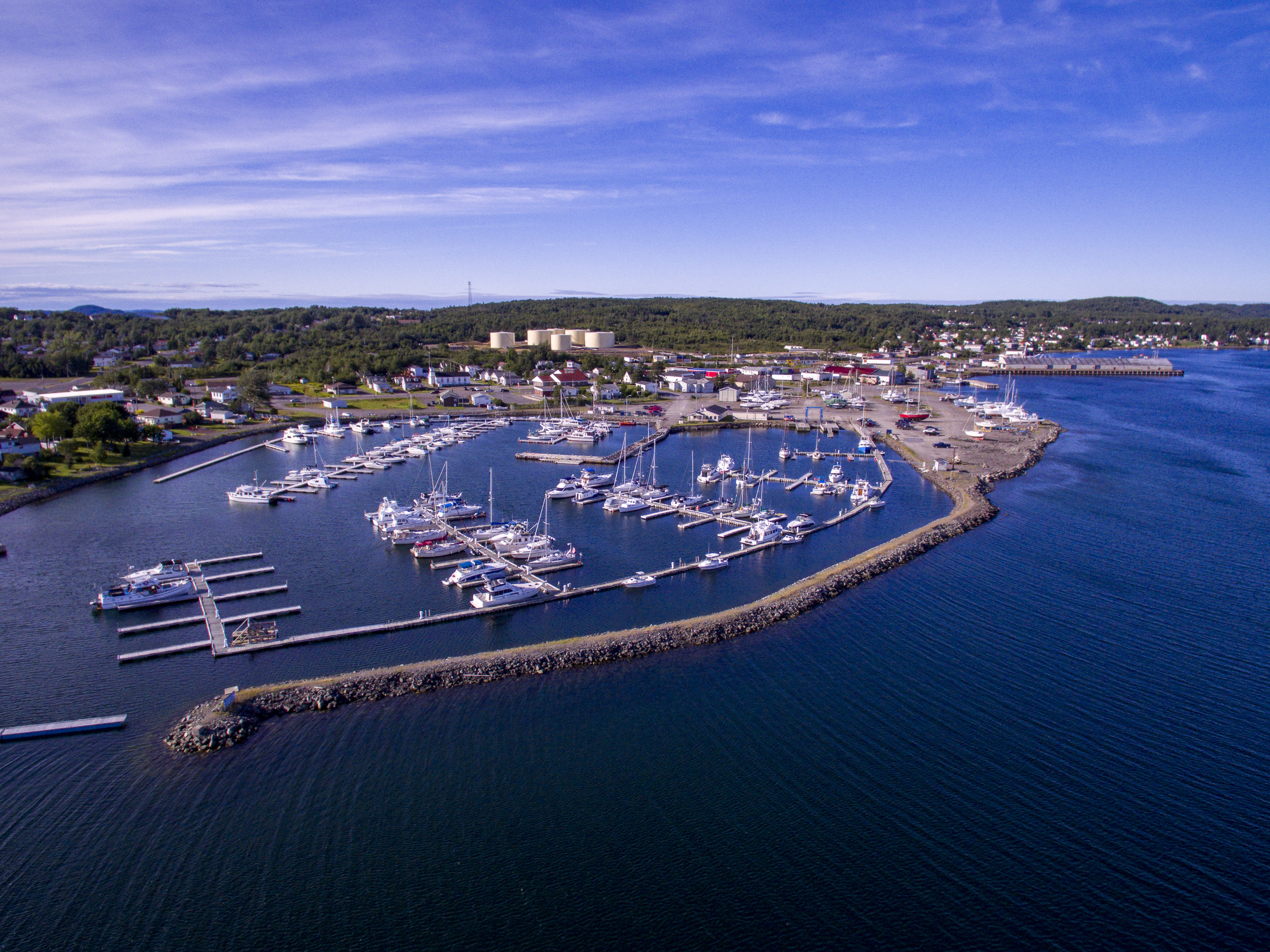

- Location of Lewisporte in Newfoundland
- Coordinates: 49°14′N 55°04′W
- Country: Canada
- Province: Newfoundland and Labrador
- Settled: 1876
- Incorporated: 1946

Government
  - MHA: Derek Bennett (LIB)

Area
  - Total: 36.9 km^{2} (14.2 sq mi)

Population (2021)
  - Total: 3,288
  - Density: 92.4/km^{2} (239/sq mi)
- Time zone: UTC-3:30 (Newfoundland Time)
  - Summer (DST): UTC-2:30 (Newfoundland Daylight)
- Postal Code: A0G 3A0
- Area code: 709
- Highways: Route 340; Route 341; Route 342
- Website: www.lewisportecanada.com

Lewisporte is a town in central Newfoundland, Canada, with a population of 3,288. It is situated in Burnt Bay which opens on to the Bay of Exploits. Lewisporte has a deep water port and related facilities that serve many communities in the region.

== History ==
Settlers first arrived in Lewisporte, previously named Burnt Bay, and then Marshallville (after the Wesleyan Methodist Missionary William T Marshall who died in 1846), in 1887 and engaged in the prosperous fishing, logging, and ship building industries. Lewisporte is named for Lewis Miller, an enterprising Scotsman who operated a logging company in central Newfoundland. Millertown, another community in this region is also named for him. The first European settlers were attracted to the area by the huge stands of birch, spruce and pine.

During the Second World War, Lewisporte was an important base of operations for the Canadian Forces. Gander's strategic location as a ‘jumping off’ point for flights going to Europe brought a larger population to Lewisporte. Three army sites were constructed in Lewisporte to protect the oil supply lines to Gander. By the end of the war there were 150 families and a population of 821. Rapid commercial and residential growth after the war has absorbed nearly all evidence of military presence.

Lewisporte's population and size have increased as the town's goods distribution function has become more important. In 1947, Lewisporte Wholesalers began operations, then in 1949 Steers Limited began their wholesale business in the community. Both the companies acted as suppliers for the entire province. Following these major companies came others who eyed the community as a distribution centre. The town was incorporated in 1946 and by 1976 the population had increased from 821 to 3780.

After the September 11, 2001 terror attacks, numerous transatlantic flights were diverted to Gander International Airport when U.S. airspace was closed. Lewisporte participated in Operation Yellow Ribbon, and sheltered and fed hundreds of stranded airline passengers for several days. In subsequent press reports, the passengers praised the citizens of Lewisporte for their concern and hospitality.

Lewisporte served as the base for a freight service to coastal Labrador, causing the town to gain its moniker of “Gateway to the North”. In September 2018, the Woodward Group and its subsidiary Labrador Marine Inc. unveiled their plans for a new roll-on, roll-off ferry service from Happy Valley-Goose Bay. This service, which began in March 2019, replaced the freight shipping to the northern coasts of Labrador formerly done out of Lewisporte.

== Demographics ==
In the 2021 Census of Population conducted by Statistics Canada, Lewisporte had a population of 3,288 living in 1,431 of its 1,632 total private dwellings, a change of −3.5% from its 2016 population of 3,409. With a land area of 36.02 km^{2} (13.91 sq mi), it had a population density of 91.3/km^{2} (236.4/sq mi) in 2021.

== See also ==
- List of cities and towns in Newfoundland and Labrador
- Lewisporte-Twillingate
