= Botwood =

- Town
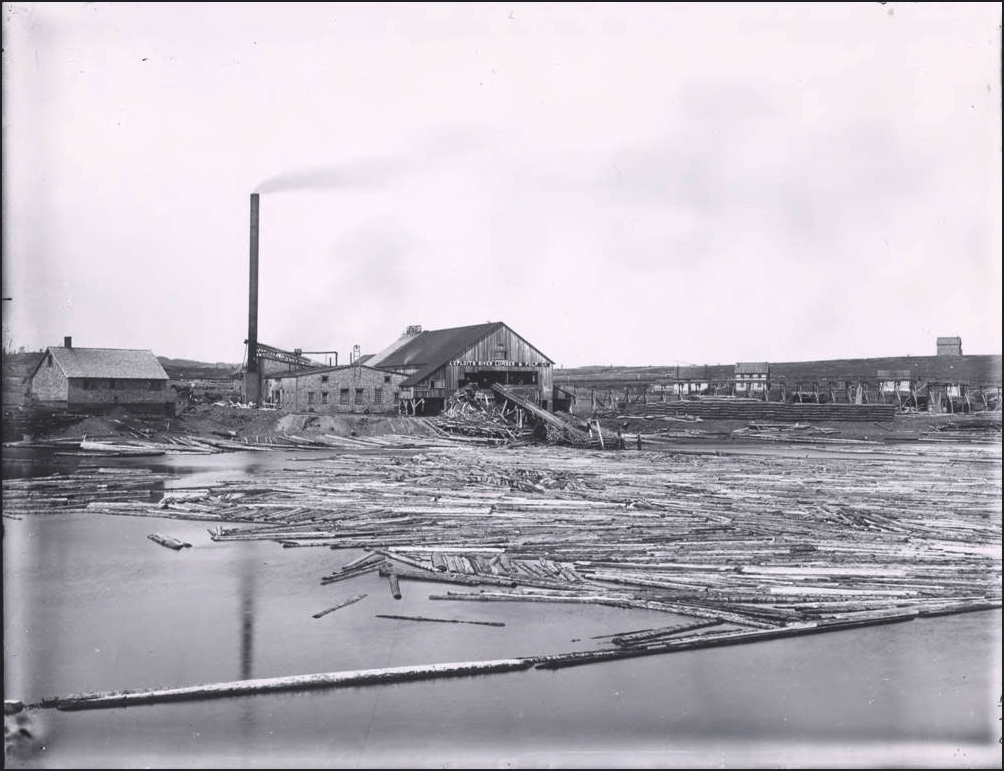
- Exploits River Lumber and Pulp Company

- Seal
- Motto: En Avant (French for "Onward")
- Location of Botwood in Newfoundland
- Coordinates: 49°09′00″N 55°22′00″W
- Country: Canada
- Province: Newfoundland and Labrador
- Census division: 6

Government
  - Mayor: Myra Budgell
  - MHA: Pleaman Forsey (PC)
  - MP: Clifford Small (CPC)

Area
  - Total: 15.05 km^{2} (5.81 sq mi)
- Elevation: 41 m (135 ft)

Population (2021)
  - Total: 2,778
  - Density: 184.6/km^{2} (478.1/sq mi)
- Time zone: UTC-3:30 (Newfoundland Time)
  - Summer (DST): UTC-2:30 (Newfoundland Daylight)
- Postal code span: A0H
- Area code: 709
- Highways: Route 350
- Website: botwoodnl.ca

Botwood is a town in north-central Newfoundland, Newfoundland and Labrador, Canada in Census Division 6. It is positioned on the west shore of the Bay of Exploits on a natural deep-water harbour. Historically, this harbour has been a significant hub for cargo ships and seaplanes. Botwood served as the North American endpoint for the first transatlantic commercial flights.

== History ==
=== Early history ===
The region now known as Botwood was part of the territory of the Beothuk people. Botwood holds a significant place in Beothuk history due to Demasduit, also known as Mary March. She was one of the last known Beothuk, captured near Beothuk Lake in 1819. Despite efforts to reunite Demasduit with her people, she contracted tuberculosis and died in Botwood Harbour in January 1820.

Permanent European settlement in Botwood began in the mid-to-late 19th century, following earlier European settlement at the mouth of the nearby Exploits River. By the end of the 19th century, the town's economy was heavily reliant on the lumber industry. This is supported by the 1891 census, which, when combining the totals from the three areas now constituting Botwood (Botwoodville, Killick Island, and Peter's Arm), recorded a total population of 173, with 38 residents working as loggers. The growth of the lumber industry in Botwood can be largely attributed to Rev. Edward Botwood. His initiative in securing timber rights across the Exploits River Valley attracted the Gooday Company to set up a significant sawmill operation in Ship Cove, later renamed Botwoodville in his honor. This mill produced approximately 45,000 board feet of lumber daily, primarily for export to England.

In 1908, construction began on the Botwood Railway; the railway ran between Bishop's Falls and Botwood. It was a joint effort between the A.N.D. Company and the A. E. Reed Company of Bishop's Falls. It was to be the transportation link for the export of pulp and paper from the newly built mill at Grand Falls. The railway became operational by the fall of 1909, and the first shipment of paper from the new mill was sent in February 1910. The A.N.D. Company took control of the railway operation in 1910, just a year after the line was completed.

The first aircraft facility in Botwood was established by Captain Sydney Bennett, who was born in Newfoundland (1897–1945), and Major Sidney Cotton from Australia (1894–1969). From 1937 to 1945, both Pan Am and the British Overseas Airways Corporation used Botwood as a terminal for their Atlantic crossings. On June 27, 1939 the Yankee Clipper left Botwood for the first Trans-Atlantic passenger flight to Foynes, Ireland, its counterpart terminal for the shortest route to Europe.

=== World War II Period ===
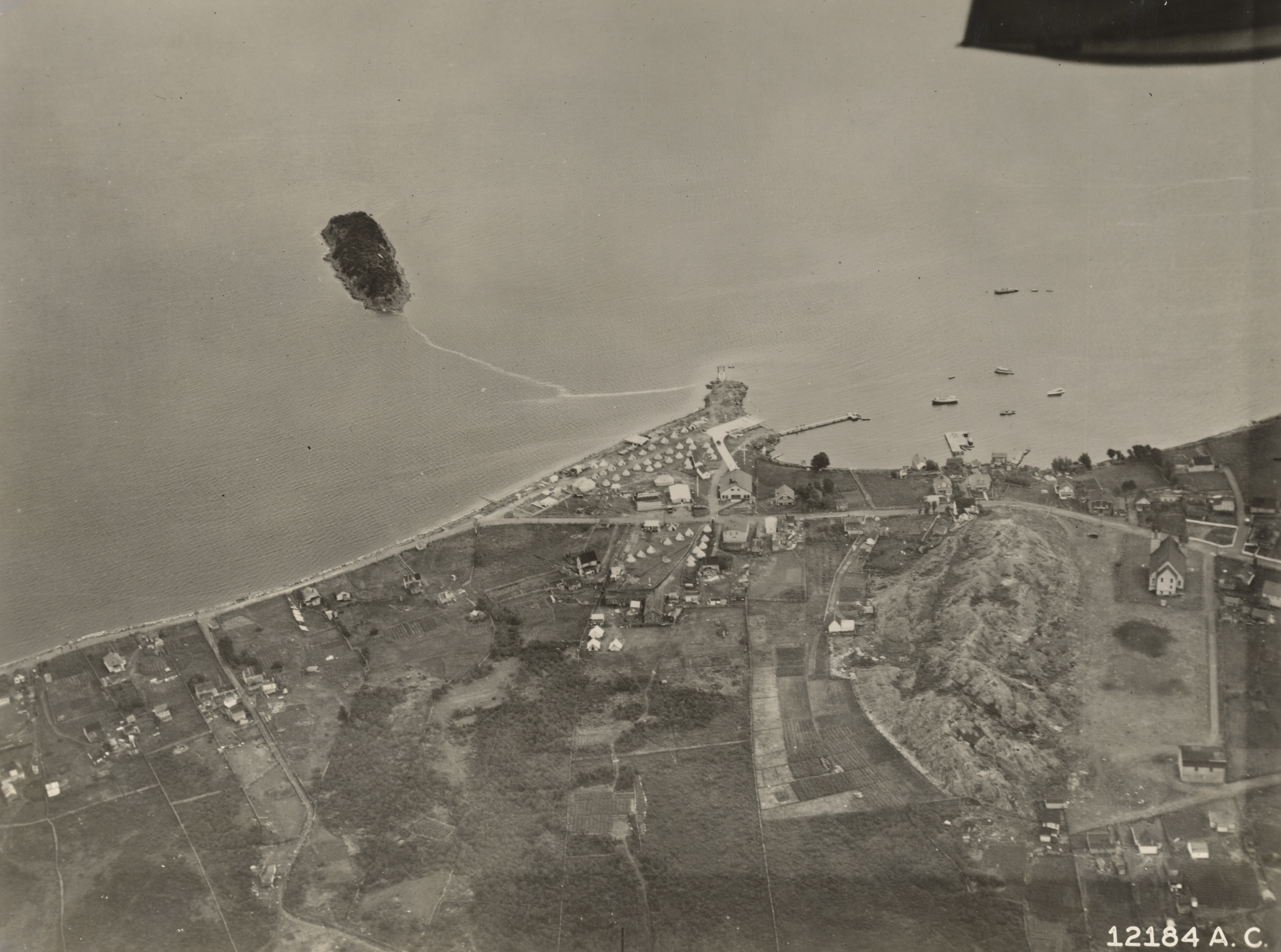
Botwood in 1940

Botwood became host to many dignitaries and celebrities, some as part of official delegations and others who were stalled there waiting out inclement flying weather. In 1943 Bob Hope and his troupe were stormbound in Botwood and performed for the RCAF Coastal Command. Franklin Delano Roosevelt, Winston Churchill and Charles Lindbergh are among some of the other well-known figures that have stayed in the town.

During World War II (1940–1945), the Royal Canadian Air Force changed Botwood into a patrolling and bombing seaplane base. It was home to two squadrons of PBY Canso flying boats equipped with torpedoes and depth charges. A large concrete slipway, two hangars, a tarmac and four bunkers were constructed.

The Canadian Army was garrisoned in the town, and built barracks, a water system, and a full-scale military hospital. The army was responsible for the manning of gun batteries at Philip's Head and Wiseman's Cove that protected the entrance to Botwood Harbour with 10" guns, as well as numerous anti-aircraft batteries throughout the community. During the war Botwood was home to approximately 10,000 Canadian and British personnel, and became Canada's most important overseas base (Newfoundland and Labrador would not join Canada until 1949).

In October 1942, the Excalibur, an American Export Airlines Sikorsky VS-44 flying boat, crashed and sank into the Bay of Exploits shortly after taking off. 11 military personnel died; 26 survived. In November 1943 a Canso flying boat crashed killing 7 personnel, while 5 survived.

=== Post-war Period ===
Military personnel left Botwood at the end of World War II. Military buildings were sold, demolished or relocated. The rise of land-based aircraft brought an end to commercial seaplane services in 1945. Despite these changes, Botwood continued to play an important role in the region's economy, notably in shipping paper from the Grand Falls-Windsor mill until its closure in 2009, and ore from Buchans until the mine ceased operations in 1984.

In November 1958, a tragic confrontation unfolded at the Harbourview Cafe in Botwood. Responding to a missing person case, RCMP Constable Terry Hoey was fatally wounded by gunfire through a closed door during a standoff with Jim Ling, the cafe owner, and his son Ken. Amid attempts to resolve the situation, the cafe was engulfed in flames, leading to the deaths of Jim and Ken Ling alongside Constable Hoey, who was the first Mountie to die in the line of duty in the province.

In 1961, a fire erupted at the A.N.D. Paper shed on Water Street, believed to have started from an engine malfunction aboard the M.V. Artensis, docked at Botwood Harbour. The fire quickly spread from the ship's aft to the wharf, consuming the town's newly acquired fire truck in the process. The fierce heat from the wharf set the A.N.D. Paper sheds ablaze, leading to their collapse. Additionally, the homes of the Nichols and Boone families were destroyed by flying sparks and embers. The fire claimed the lives of three engineers aboard the Artensis.

The Canadian TV series Still Standing profiled Botwood in an episode that aired on December 1, 2020.

== Demographics ==
In the 2021 Census of Population conducted by Statistics Canada, Botwood had a population of 2,778 living in 1,251 of its 1,389 total private dwellings, a change of −3.4% from its 2016 population of 2,875. With a land area of 14.56 km^{2} (5.62 sq mi), it had a population density of 190.8/km^{2} (494.2/sq mi) in 2021.

Canada census – Botwood community profile

	2021	2016	2011
Population	2,778 (-3.4% from 2016)	2,875 (-4.4% from 2011)	3,008 (-1.4% from 2006)
Land area	14.56 km^{2} (5.62 sq mi)	15.05 km^{2} (5.81 sq mi)	15.05 km^{2} (5.81 sq mi)
Population density	190.8/km^{2} (494/sq mi)	191.1/km^{2} (495/sq mi)	199.9/km^{2} (518/sq mi)
Median age	56.4 (M: 55.6, F: 56.8)	51.8 (M: 51.2, F: 52.5)	50.5 (M: 49.8, F: 51.3)
Private dwellings	1,389 (total) 1,251 (occupied)	1,302 (total)	1,326 (total)
Median household income	$54,800	$47,680	$NA

References: 2021 2016 2011

== Tourism ==
In 2010, a mural to celebrate the Botwood Cottage Hospital was commissioned by the Botwood Mural Arts Society. It was entitled Pulse of the Community and was painted by Manitoban artist Charlie Johnston. It is located on the previous site of the Botwood Cottage Hospital, now the site of a grocery store. This was the beginning of an ongoing project by the society to commission murals throughout the town to celebrate its unique history and increase tourism.

A number of other murals have been completed around the town. As of October 2019 there are thirteen murals. The murals include the following:

- Twilight of Airmail, The Pulse of the Community, Come Home and Remodulating Nous / Making Waves by Charlie Johnston
- Sceviour's Sawmill by local artist, Caroline Noseworthy-Dawe
- The Water Nipper by Newfoundland artist Lloyd Pretty
- Botwood WWII History 1939–45, Salute to Our Veterans, The Two R's and Clash of Culturesby Craig Goudie
- The Path We've Built by Fernanda Gonzalez Latrecchiana
- Honouring Our Fallen, Supporting Our Future by Ciaran Gallagher
- Answering the Call by Marat Danilyan

== Climate ==
Climate data for Botwood
Month	Jan	Feb	Mar	Apr	May	Jun	Jul	Aug	Sep	Oct	Nov	Dec	Year
Record high °C (°F)	13 (55)	13 (55)	15.5 (59.9)	24 (75)	28 (82)	33 (91)	35 (95)	36.7 (98.1)	29.4 (84.9)	26.1 (79.0)	20 (68)	13.9 (57.0)	36.7 (98.1)
Mean daily maximum °C (°F)	−2.9 (26.8)	−3.4 (25.9)	0.9 (33.6)	6.2 (43.2)	12.4 (54.3)	17.9 (64.2)	22.5 (72.5)	21.7 (71.1)	16.7 (62.1)	10.5 (50.9)	4.9 (40.8)	−0.4 (31.3)	8.9 (48.0)
Mean daily minimum °C (°F)	−12.4 (9.7)	−12.9 (8.8)	−8.1 (17.4)	−2 (28)	2.5 (36.5)	6.9 (44.4)	11.4 (52.5)	11.2 (52.2)	7.3 (45.1)	2.6 (36.7)	−1.9 (28.6)	−8.2 (17.2)	−0.3 (31.5)
Record low °C (°F)	−30 (−22)	−36.7 (−34.1)	−30 (−22)	−19 (−2)	−6.7 (19.9)	−2.8 (27.0)	0 (32)	−1.1 (30.0)	−4.4 (24.1)	−8 (18)	−16 (3)	−28.9 (−20.0)	−36.7 (−34.1)
Average precipitation mm (inches)	83.8 (3.30)	74.8 (2.94)	74.1 (2.92)	64 (2.5)	73.2 (2.88)	88 (3.5)	76.8 (3.02)	96.8 (3.81)	91.9 (3.62)	106.1 (4.18)	78.6 (3.09)	78.4 (3.09)	986.4 (38.83)
Source: Environment Canada

== See also ==
- List of cities and towns in Newfoundland and Labrador
