= James Patrick Howley =

Newfoundland naturalist and geologist (1847–1918)

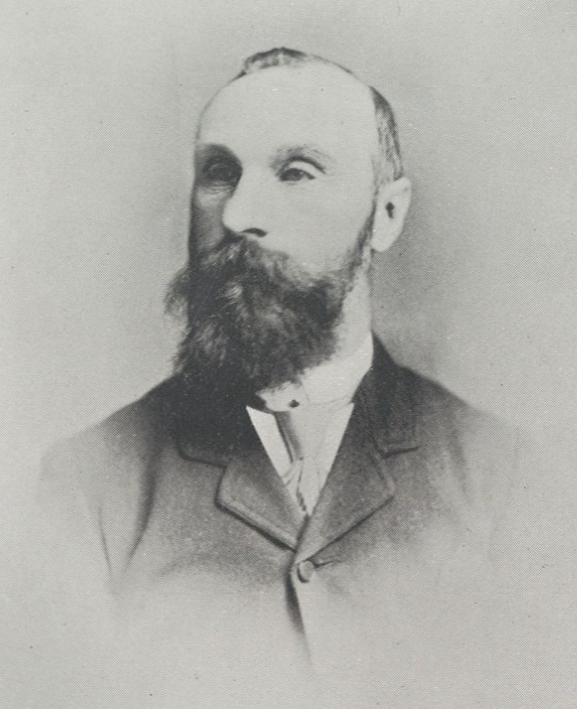
- Howley in 1894
- Born: July 7, 1847; St. John's, Newfoundland Colony
- Died: January 1, 1918 (aged 70); St. John's, Newfoundland
- Education: Saint Bonaventure's College
- Notable work: The Beothucks or Red Indians (1915)
- Spouse: Elizabeth Anne Firth
- Children: 6, including William
- Relatives: Michael Francis Howley (brother)

James Patrick Howley (July 7, 1847 – January 1, 1918) was a Newfoundland naturalist and geologist. He was one of the first people of European descent to visit the interior of the island of Newfoundland at the Bay du Nord River system. Howley is best known for his book The Beothucks or Red Indians (1915), which documents the extinct Beothuk people.

== Biography ==
Howley was born on the Mount Cashel property on Torbay Road, St. John's, Newfoundland as the son of Richard Howley and Eliza (née Burke). He was educated at Saint Bonaventure's College in St. John's.

For a time he worked in the office of the colonial secretary, but his fame came when he participated in the geographical and topographical survey of the colony of Newfoundland. In the course of his surveying, he met John Peyton Jr., who had captured the Beothuk woman Demasduit alongside his father John Peyton Sr. and his servants. Peyton Jr. related to Howley many stories of the Beothuk, which started a life long fascination with Newfoundland's lost indigenous people. Howley began collecting artifacts, oral history and documents which related to the Beothuk. His collection culminated in the publication of The Beothucks or Red Indians, which was published by Cambridge University Press in 1915. The book remains an important source on the Beothuk.

Howley was also a founding director of the Newfoundland Museum.

== Legacy ==
Howley's son William would go on to serve in the Newfoundland House of Assembly and the Newfoundland Commission of Government.

In May 2009, William J. Kirwin and Patrick O'Flaherty published an edited version of Howley's Reminiscences of Forty-two Years of Exploration in and about Newfoundland. In 2016, he was named a National Historic Person.

== See also ==
- Beothuk language
