= Henrietta Hamilton =

English painter

Henrietta Martha, Lady Hamilton
- Born: 1780; Stanmore, United Kingdom
- Died: 1857 (aged 76–77); London, United Kingdom
- Known for: Painting
- Spouse: Charles Hamilton

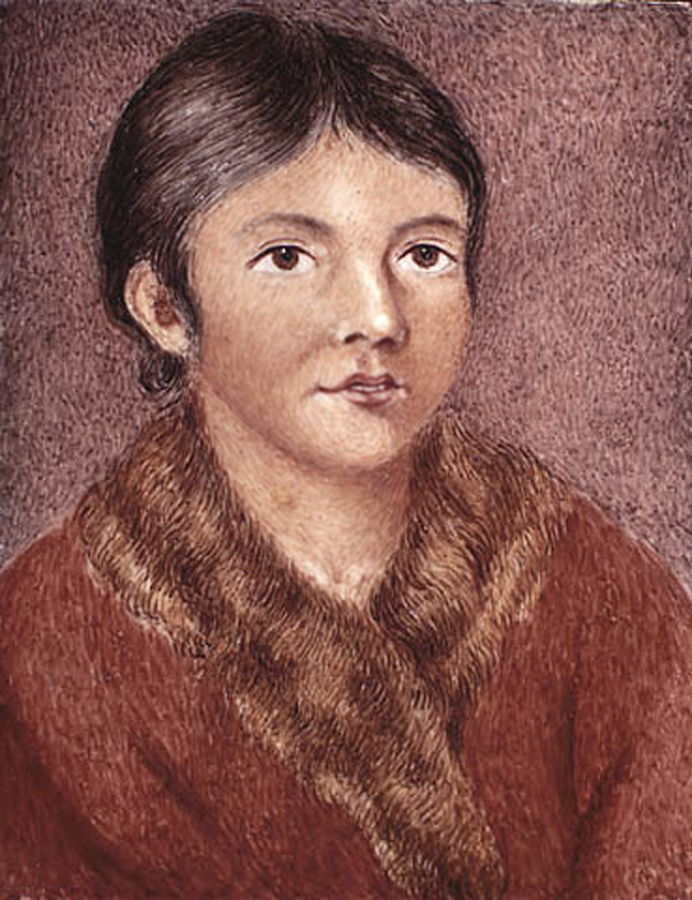
Demasduit (Mary March), 1819 Library and Archives Canada

Henrietta Martha, Lady Hamilton (1780–1857) was born in Stanmore, Middlesex, England, and was the wife of Sir Charles Hamilton, Governor of Newfoundland. She is best known for her miniature portrait entitled Mary March. The painting is a watercolour on ivory of a Beothuk Indigenous woman Demasduit, and is considered by many to be the only representation of a Beothuk taken from life. It was painted in 1819 at St. John's where she lived with her husband during his term as governor from 1818 to 1824.

In the fall of 1818, a small group of Beothuks had taken a boat and some fishing equipment at the mouth of the Exploits River. Lady Hamilton's husband, Governor Hamilton, had authorized an attempt to recover the stolen property. On March 1, 1819, John Peyton Jr. and eight armed men went up the Exploits River to Red Indian Lake in search of the Beothuks and their equipment. A dozen Beothuk fled the campsite, Demasduit among them. Bogged down in the snow, she exposed her breasts, as she was a nursing mother, and begged for mercy. Demasduit was captured; Nonosabasut, her husband and the leader of the group, was killed while attempting to prevent her capture. Her infant son died a few days after she was taken. Demasduit was called Mary March because she was captured on a bitter March day. Peyton and his men were absolved of the murder of her husband by a grand jury in St. John's. The painting resides in the Portrait Gallery of Canada in Ottawa.

Lady Hamilton painted mostly in watercolors. Her other well-known work is "Woodlands Cottage".

Hamilton and her husband returned to England after his posting. She was widowed in 1849 and died in London in 1857.
