= HMS Adonis =

1806 Adonis-class schooner

History

United Kingdom
- Name: HMS Adonis
- Ordered: 2 April 1804
- Builder: Bermuda
- Launched: 1806
- Commissioned: October 1806
- Fate: Sold 1816

United Kingdom
- Name: Adonis
- Owner: 1823:J. Reed; 1835:Blythe & Son
- Acquired: 1814 by purchase
- Fate: Wrecked June 1835

General characteristics
- Class & type: Adonis-class
- Tons burthen: 11075/94, or 139 (bm)
- Length: 68 ft 2 in (20.8 m) (gundeck); 50 ft 4 5/8 in (15.4 m) (keel)
- Beam: 20 ft 4 in (6.2 m)
- Depth of hold: 10 ft 3 in (3.1 m)
- Sail plan: Schooner
- Complement: 35
- Armament: 8 × 18-pounder carronades + 2 × 6-pounder bow chasers

HMS Adonis was the name vessel of her class of schooners of the Royal Navy during the Napoleonic War. She was built at Bermuda using Bermudan cedar and completed in 1806. She had a relatively uneventful career, primarily on the Newfoundland station, before the Admiralty sold her in 1814. She then became the mercantile Adonis and sailed to Africa and the Indian Ocean until she was wrecked in June 1835 on the Maldive Islands.

== Career ==
Adonis was commissioned in March 1806 under the command of Lieutenant John Manton. In 1807 Adonis was commissioned at Newfoundland under the command of Sub-Lieutenant J. White. Between 30 November 1807 and 30 January 1808 she was at Portsmouth undergoing conversion to a schooner.

Her only capture occurred while she was in port at Portsmouth. In November 1807 Lieutenant John M'Killop was in command.

Earlier, on 26 October 1807 Tsar Alexander I of Russia declared war on Great Britain. The official news did not arrive in the United Kingdom until 2 December, at which time the British declared an embargo on all Russian vessels in British ports. Adonis was one of some 70 vessels that shared in the seizure of the 44-gun Russian frigate Speshnoy, then in Portsmouth harbour. (Note: An able seaman's share of the prize money was 14s 7½d.) The British seized the Russian storeship Wilhelmina at the same time.

M'Killop's replacement in March 1808 was Lieutenant William Gibbons. He sailed her for Newfoundland on 16 June and again in April 1809.

In 1810 Lieutenant David Buchan became captain of Adonis. In autumn 1810 he conducted an expedition to the River of Exploits. From there he and his men marched inland for 130 miles to establish contact with the dwindling native Beothuk population, one of the indigenous peoples of the Americas in the region. Unfortunately, the expedition resulted in the death and decapitation of two marines at their hands.

In 1813 Adonis and the frigate Rosamond escorted the Newfoundland fishing fleet back to Great Britain. The voyage was stormy and the vessels separated near the English Channel. Adonis regained the convoy but as they approached the Isles of Scilly they encountered a French fleet. Adonis was too small meaningfully to defend the convoy and only escaped by jettisoning all her guns.

Disposal: Adonis was placed in Ordinary at Portsmouth in 1814. (Buchan transferred to Pike on 26 March 1814.) In September 1814 the Admiralty put Adonis up for sale at Portsmouth. She sold there for £400 on 1 September 1814.

== Mercantile career ==
Adonis first appeared on Lloyd's Register in 1821 with J. Carfa, master, J. Reed, owner, and trade London–Africa. Her burthen was substantially greater than it had been when she was sold, raising the possibility that she had been lengthened between the time of her purchase and her appearance in Lloyd's Register. The entry does carry the notation L.O.& C for live oak and cedar, which would be consistent with extensive refurbishment.

The following data is from Lloyd's Register

Year	Master	Owner	Trade
1825	E. Bunnell	J. Reed	London
1830	W. Major; Bridge	J. Reed	London–Cape Coast Castle
1835	Hawks	Blyth & Son.	London–Mauritius

== Fate ==
On 29 June 1835 Adonis, Hawks, master, was sailing from Mauritius to China when she wrecked on a reef near the Maldives and her crew abandoned her. The specie she was carrying and her crew were saved. Lieutenant J.A. Young and Mr. W. Christopher, both of the Indian Navy, were in residence at Malé. When they heard that an English vessel had wrecked, Mr. Christopher set out in a local boat on 7 July. He returned to Malé on 29 July with the rescued men.

The Government of India thanked the Sultan of the Maldives for the "humane and liberal conduct" that he and his subjects extended to the crews of Adonis and Vicissitude, which was wrecked in 1836. The Sultan accepted some presents as marks of friendship, but declined any payment, though the Government made a liberal offer.
