= John Peyton (fisherman) =

English fisher and trapper in Newfoundland

John Peyton Sr. (1749–1829) was an English-born fisherman and trapper in the Colony of Newfoundland.

== History ==
He was born in Christchurch, Dorset and came to Newfoundland in 1770. He lived in Fogo, where he was employed in cod fishing, until around 1775. He later spent his summers at Exploits and then his winters at Lower Sandy Point on the Bay of Exploits. He fished for salmon and was involved in the fur trade; he also owned his own schooner. In 1788, Peyton married Ann Galton. His wife and children remained at Dorset in England until 1812. Both his wife and daughter died that year and Peyton subsequently brought his son John to Newfoundland to join him as a partner in business. In 1819, he took part in an expedition led by his son John Peyton Jr., which ended with the capture of a Beothuk woman named Demasduit and the killing of her husband Nonosabasut, who was attempting to negotiate her release. The last known living Beothuk, Shawnadithit, spent five years as a servant in the Peyton household. Peyton Jr. was tried for the killing of Nonosabasut and was found not guilty by the jury, with the judge concluding that "... (there was) no malice on the part of Peyton's party to get possession of any of (the Indians) by such violence as would occasion bloodshed."

Peyton Sr. was accused of violence against the Beothuks in retaliation for the theft of supplies from his fishing stations. In a significant incident in the winter of 1781, led two other men in an expedition up the Exploits River, to recover fishing gear and other material believed taken by the Beothuk. According to Peyton Sr. after three days, they came upon a Beothuk encampment (of likely 30 to 50 people); he and his men fired on the Beothuk, killing some and wounding others, with the exact number of victims unknown. There was at least one uninjured survivor, and Peyton Sr. is recorded as having beaten an injured Beothuk to death with an animal trap. The surviving Beothuk who were able fled, and Peyton and his men collected what furs, skins and gear they could carry and left. Though those Peyton Sr. told about the encounter believed he did not tell them the full details of what occurred. John Bland, the magistrate at Bonavista, recommended that he be expelled from the Bay of Exploits.

Peyton died in the Bay of Exploits in 1829.

== Family ==
His grandson, Thomas Peyton, later served in the Newfoundland assembly.
