= Nonosabasut =

Beothuk tribal chief

Nonosabasut (died March 1819) was a leader of the Beothuk people. He was the head of a family and partner of Demasduit, and was born on the island of Newfoundland.

== Biography ==
Nonosabasut was one of a group of Beothuk who was encountered by David Buchan on January 24, 1811 at Beothuk Lake. Buchan had left two marines at the native camp while he, Nonosabasut and three other Beothuk went to retrieve a cache of presents Buchan had left behind. Fearing the worst, Nonosabasut became suspicious of being captured; he and the two Beothuks fled. While back at the camp they had convinced the rest of the group that the intentions of Buchan and his marines were hostile. The two marines were beheaded and the camp was then dispersed.

In March 1819, John Peyton Jr. led another expedition authorized by Governor Charles Hamilton to recover stolen property. Apparently, some items had been stolen by the Beothuk from nearby fishing stations in the Bay of Exploits. The fate of the last remaining Beothuk was very much a concern at that time, and the expedition was also requested to establish friendly relations with them. On March 5, Peyton's party surprised a small group of Beothuk at Beothuk Lake who attempted to escape. Peyton captured Demasduit, the wife of Nonosabasut. Nonosabasut approached the party of armed men, holding the tip of a pine branch, a symbol of peace, and through words and gestures asked Peyton to release Demasduit. A scuffle broke out when Peyton refused to release her, and Nonosabasut was shot and killed.

Later, a grand jury in St. John's, absolved Peyton and his men of Nonosabasut's murder. The judge concluded that "... (there was) no malice on the part of Peyton's party to get possession of any of (the Indians) by such violence as would occasion bloodshed."

Nonosabasut's body was placed in a sepulchre; his infant son (and eventually Demasduit herself) were also placed in his sepulchre.

== Legacy ==
In 1828, the sepulchre was found by William Cormack, who at that time removed skulls and also some of the goods from the grave. Among the items taken by Cormack was Nonosabasut's skull, which was sent to the Royal Museum, Edinburgh, Scotland.

In 2020, the remains of Demasduit and Nonosabasut were repatriated from Scotland after years of advocacy. Chief Mi'sel Joe of the Miawpukek First Nation in Conne River first began the push for repatriation in 2015, and he was joined by other Indigenous leaders. Premier of Newfoundland and Labrador Dwight Ball and Heritage Minister Mélanie Joly made formal requests to National Museums Scotland in 2016, with Ball crediting Chief Mi'sel Joe specifically for beginning the process by bringing the issue to public attention. Their remains had been in Scotland for 191 years when they were returned to Newfoundland and were stored at The Rooms, a provincial museum and archive in St. John's. This return was praised and recognized by Canadian politicians including Premier of Newfoundland and Labrador Dwight Ball and Minister of Canadian Heritage Steven Guilbeault, as well as by leaders from the Miawpukek First Nation, Innu Nation, Nunatsiavut, NunatuKavut, and Qalipu First Nation. In 2022, CBC News reported that the government of Newfoundland and Labrador was planning a new cultural centre at Beothuk Lake to serve as a final resting place for the remains.

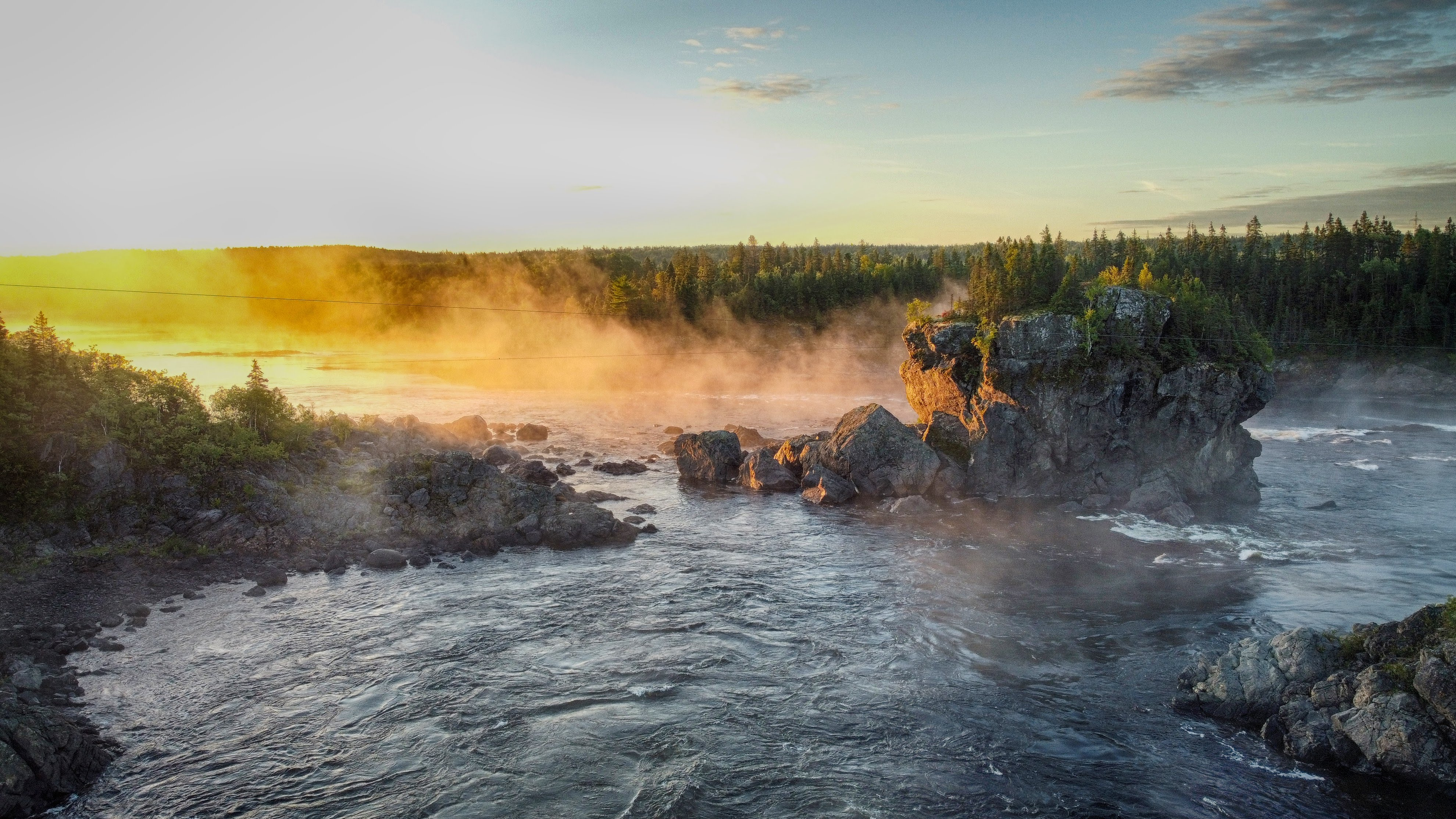
Nonosabasut rock, in the Exploits river.

In 2017, Nonosabasut Rock was officially named after the Beothuk chief, lobbied for by retired teacher Anne Warr from Grand Falls-Windsor and her students. Nonosabasut Rock is located in the Exploits River in central Newfoundland, and the left side of the rock is said to resemble the chief's face, with the inspiration for naming it after him being described by the Woodland Primary grade two students back in 2006 as desiring to "recognize the heroic deed of [Demasduit's] husband." The town of Grand Falls-Windsor donated a plaque for Nonosabasut Rock, which features a photo of the rock and a poem "written by Woodland Primary teacher Cheryl Burt, which tells the history of the Beothuk and the chief." Warr's former students from Woodland Primary, as adults, contributed to the campaign to recognize Nonosabasut and the Beothuk. Prior to the official designation in 2017, the grade two class had contacted the town council of Grand Falls-Windsor about the name, saying that "We wrote to our town council and they gave us permission to name the rock, Nonosabusut [sic] Rock" in a letter to CBC. The class wrote the letter in a nomination of Nonosabasut Rock for a competition CBC held in 2007 determining the Seven Wonders of Canada, and the online poll for Nonosabasut Rock received 8,563 votes.

== Genetic testing ==
In 2007, examination of short mtDNA sequences was conducted on material from the teeth of Nonosabasut and his wife Demasduit. The results assigned them broadly to Haplogroup C (mtDNA) and Haplogroup X (mtDNA), respectively. These haplogroups are common in Indigenous peoples of the Northeast, including the current Mi'kmaq people of Newfoundland. Oral tradition of the Mi'kmaq on the island states that they had cordial relations with the Beothuk in the Pre-Contact period, and the record documents shared ancestry with European settlers, from 1607 onward. In 2017, complete mtDNA genome sequences were obtained from Nonosabasut and Demasduit, which occur in X2a1b and C1c sub-haplogroups, respectively. Identical or near-identical mitogenomes sequences appear in modern persons of indigenous descent.

== See also ==
- List of people of Newfoundland and Labrador
