= Demasduit =

Beothuk woman

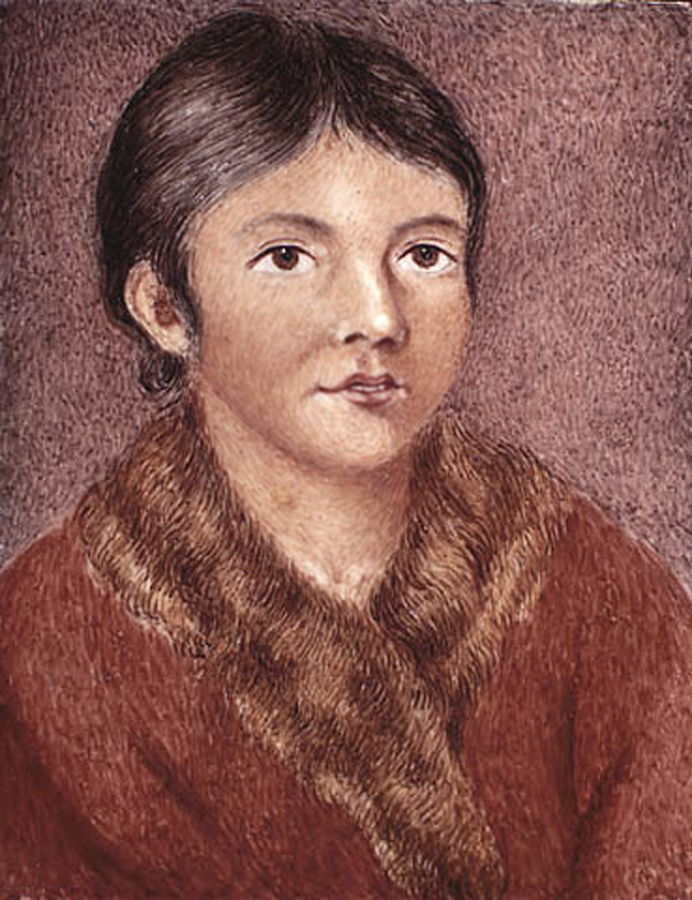
Watercolour on ivory miniature Portrait of Demasduit (Mary March), by Henrietta Hamilton, 1819 (Library and Archives Canada)

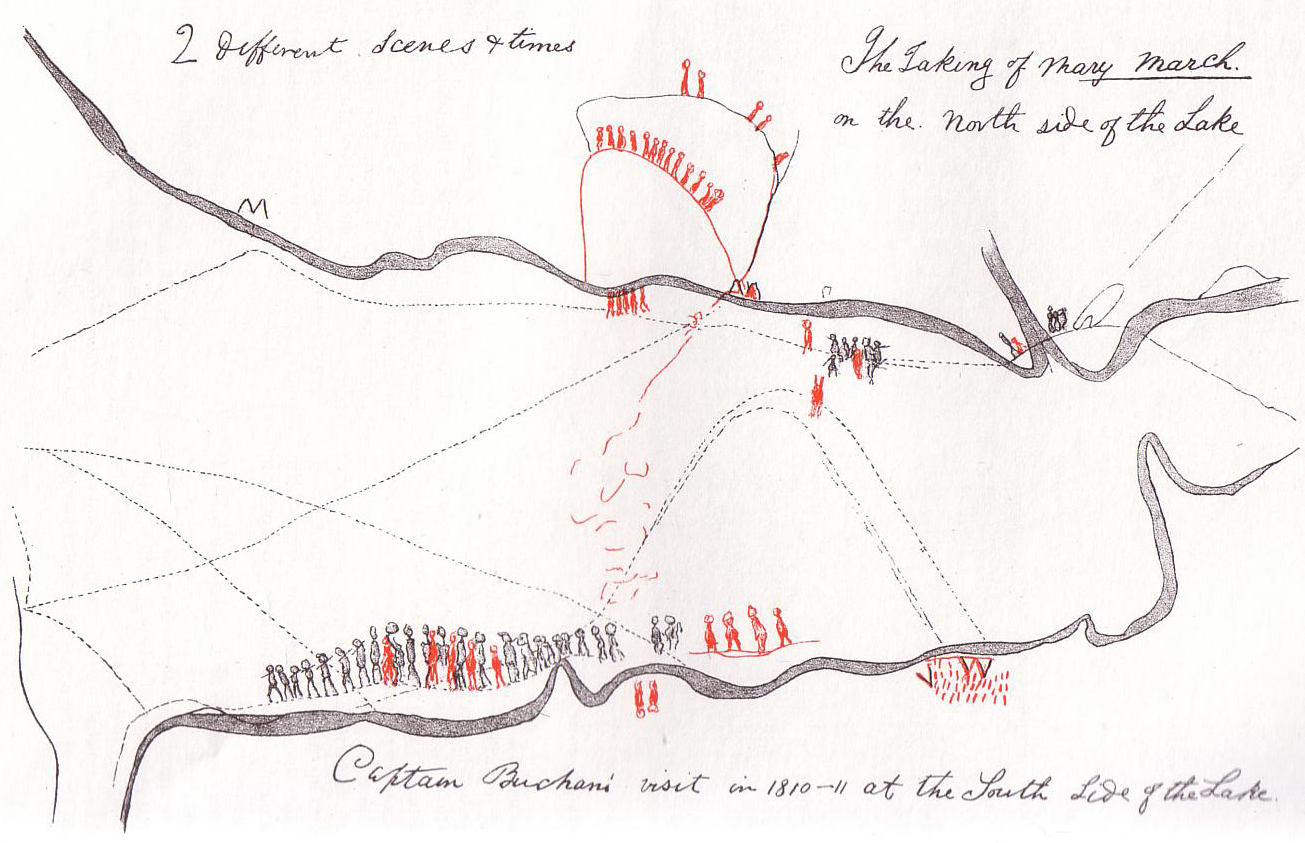
The taking of Demasduit, drawn by her niece Shanawdithit

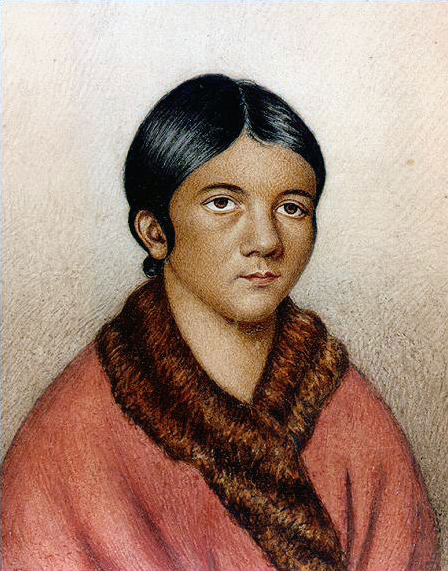
This miniature portrait called A female Red Indian of Newfoundland and dated 1841 by some sources may have been painted by naturalist Philip Henry Gosse and is most likely a later copy of Portrait of Demasduit by Hamilton (above)

Demasduit (c. 1796 – January 8, 1820) was a Beothuk woman, one of the last of her people on Newfoundland.

== Biography ==
Demasduit was born around 1796, near the end of the 18th century. It was once believed that the Beothuk population had been decimated by conflict with European settlers. However, the most reliable research today suggests instead that the Beothuk population was very small, between 500 and 1,000 people at the time of European contact, and when European settlers arrived permanently, the Beothuk were cut off from their traditional coastal hunting grounds. Furthermore, there was no one to promote peaceful relations between the Beothuk and the settlers. As Newfoundland's population was small, a missionary effort could not be supported, and the European governments were mainly interested in marine resources, so no agents were appointed to liaise with the native population. Further contributing to the Beothuk's demise was the arrival of European diseases in North America.

In the fall of 1818, a small group of Beothuks had captured a boat and some fishing equipment near the mouth of the Exploits River. The governor of the colony, Sir Charles Hamilton, authorized an attempt to recover the stolen property. On March 1, 1819, John Peyton Jr. and eight armed men went up the Exploits River to Beothuk Lake in search of the Beothuks and their equipment. A dozen Beothuk fled the campsite, Demasduit among them. Bogged down in the snow, she exposed her breasts, a nursing mother, begging for mercy. Nonosabasut, her husband and the leader of the group, was killed while attempting to negotiate for Demasduit’s release. Her infant son died two days after she was taken.

Peyton and his men were absolved of the murder of Nonosabasut by a grand jury in St. John's, the judge concluding that "[there was] no malice on the part of Peyton's party to get possession of any of [the Indians] by such violence as would occasion bloodshed".

Demasduit was taken to Twillingate and for a time lived with the Anglican priest there, Rev. John Leigh. He learned that she was also called Shendoreth and Waunathoake, but he renamed her Mary March, after the Virgin Mary and the month in which she was kidnapped. Demasduit was brought to St. John's and spent much of the spring of 1819 in St. John's, brought there by Leigh and John Peyton Jr. While there, Lady Hamilton painted her portrait.

During the summer of 1819, a number of attempts were made to return her to her people, without success. Captain David Buchan was to go overland to Beothuk Lake with Demasduit in November, the people of St. John's and Notre Dame Bay having raised the money to return the Beothuk to her home. However, she was taken ill and died of tuberculosis at Ship Cove (now Botwood) aboard Buchan's vessel Grasshopper, on 8 January 1820. Her body was left in a coffin on the lakeshore, where it was found by members of her tribe and returned to her village in February. Demasduit's body was initially placed in a burial hut beside her husband and child, before her remains and her husband's were later removed by William Cormack and brought to Scotland, where eventually their remains were held in the National Museum of Scotland.

There were only thirty-one of the Beothuk remaining at that time.

== Legacy ==
In 2007, the Government of Canada recognized Demasduit as a Person of National Historic Significance.

In 2020, the remains of Demasduit and her husband Nonosabasut were repatriated from Scotland after years of advocacy. Chief Mi'sel Joe of the Miawpukek First Nation in Conne River first began the push for repatriation in 2015, and he was joined by other Indigenous leaders. Premier of Newfoundland and Labrador Dwight Ball and Heritage Minister Mélanie Joly made formal requests to National Museums Scotland in 2016, with Ball crediting Chief Mi'sel Joe specifically for beginning the process by bringing the issue to public attention. Their remains had been in Scotland for 191 years when they were returned to Newfoundland and were stored at The Rooms, a provincial museum and archive in St. John's. This return was praised and recognized by Canadian politicians including Premier Ball and Minister of Canadian Heritage Steven Guilbeault, as well as by leaders from the Miawpukek First Nation, Innu Nation, Nunatsiavut, NunatuKavut, and Qalipu First Nation. In 2022, CBC News reported that the government of Newfoundland and Labrador was planning a new cultural centre at Beothuk Lake to serve as a final resting place for the remains.

Demasduit's niece, a young woman named Shanawdithit (1801–1829), was the last known Beothuk.

The song "Demasduit Dream", recorded by Newfoundland band Great Big Sea, is named after Demasduit and alludes to her life and capture.

The Demasduit Regional Museum, formerly known as the Mary March Provincial Museum, in the town of Grand Falls-Windsor, Newfoundland and Labrador, is named after her. The museum's exhibits "look at the history of the Beothuk, early European settlers, and the stories of a thriving, vibrant Mi’kmaq population in this area." In May 2006, a group of local grade 2 students, led by student Conor O'Driscoll, helped collect more than 500 signatures on a petition to rename the museum to Demasduit's original identity, rather than the name she was given after her capture. The director of The Rooms, which owns and operates in the museum, announced in December 2021, that they would rename it using Demasduit's original name rather than Mary March. They considered multiple options for renaming the museum, including the Demasduit Regional Interpretation Centre, before deciding on the new name of Demasduit Regional Museum.

In November 2022, the governments of Canada and Newfoundland and Labrador announced plans for a commemoration project recognizing 200 years since the death of Demasduit. The project was delayed due to the COVID-19 pandemic. The plans include a bronze statue of Demasduit, Nonosabasut, and their child, as well as a surrounding healing garden, to be located in Botwood. Funding from this project was contributed by the federal and provincial governments through the Department of Canadian Heritage, as well as additional funding from the Town of Botwood, Miawpukek First Nation, Botwood Heritage Society, Botwood Mural Arts Society and the United Church of Canada.

== Genetic testing ==
In 2007, DNA testing was conducted on material from the teeth of Demasduit and her husband Nonosabasut. The results assigned them to Haplogroup X (mtDNA) and Haplogroup C (mtDNA), respectively, which are also found in current Mi'kmaq populations in Newfoundland.

== See also ==
- List of people of Newfoundland and Labrador
- Shanawdithit and Demasduit were the last members of the Beothuk people of Newfoundland and Labrador
- Ishi, the last known member of the Yahi people of California
- Squanto, the last member of the Patuxet people of Massachusetts
- The Man of the Hole, last member of an uncontacted people of Brazil
- Juana Maria, the last known member of the Nicoleño tribe
