= William Cormack =

Scottish-Newfoundlander explorer

- Born: 5 May 1796; St. John's, Newfoundland Colony
- Died: 30 April 1868 (aged 71); New Westminster, British Columbia

William Epps Cormack (5 May 1796 – 30 April 1868) was a Scottish explorer, philanthropist, agriculturalist and author, born St. John's, Newfoundland. Cormack was the first person of European descent to journey across the interior of the island. His account of his travels was first published in Britain in 1824. Interested in studying and trying to preserve Native culture, he founded the Beothuk Institution in 1827.

== Early life and education ==
The son of a well-to-do Scottish family, Cormack was born in Newfoundland. He traveled to Scotland to study at the University of Glasgow and the University of Edinburgh, which were centres of the Enlightenment teaching and scholars. In 1818 he left the country to lead a group of Scottish emigrants to Prince Edward Island, where they settled on the Hunter River near Charlottetown.

== Career ==
In 1822, he returned to his native Newfoundland to carry on some family business and property interests. Cormack decided to undertake a venture never before attempted by a European, to explore the interior of Newfoundland. His other goal was to make contact with the Beothuk and to establish friendly relationship with the few surviving native people.

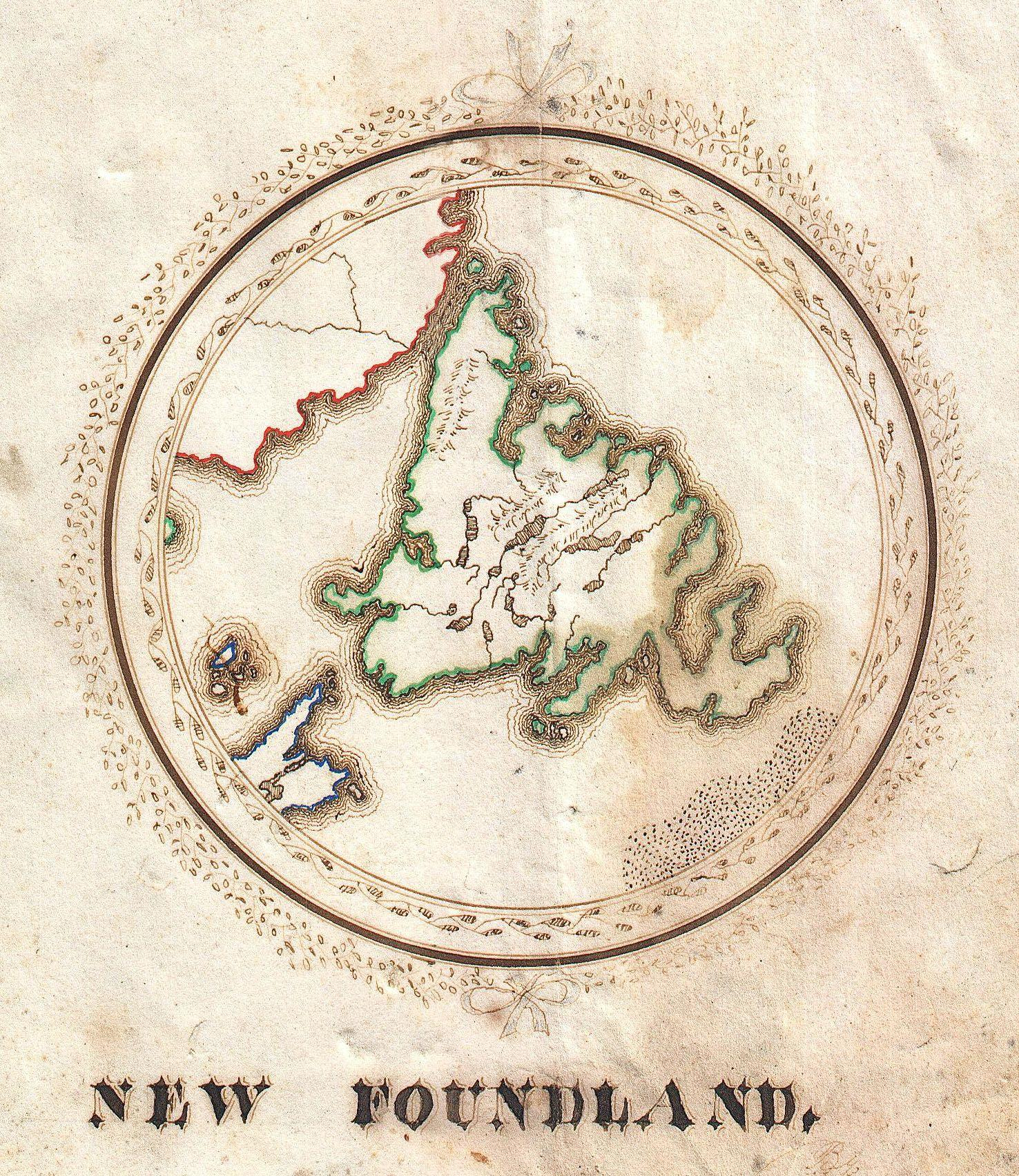
Anonymous 1810 map of the Island of Newfoundland. Though it had not been traversed, significant features of its interior, such as major lakes, were known.

On 5 September 1822, Cormack's expedition departed from Smith Sound, Trinity Bay, along with his only companion Joseph Sylvester, a young Mi'kmaq hunter from Miawpukek, Bay d'Espoir. By early October, they had reached the centre of the island and came across a hilly ridge, which Cormack named after his Edinburgh teacher (Robert Jameson) as Jameson's Mountains (now Jamieson Hills). They arrived in St. George's Bay on 4 November of the same year but had not encountered any Beothuk.

Cormack continued on to Little Bay and Fortune. He departed for Dartmouth, England, arriving there on 10 February 1823. From his exploration, Cormack prepared an account of his travels, which was first published in England in 1824. Other versions of his travels were published in 1828 and 1856. He describes the interior with an accuracy no subsequent traveller has matched; his Narrative is the undisputed classic of Newfoundland travel. His botanical observations were the most important since those of Sir Joseph Banks in 1766. His account of the mineralogy and geology of the interior were important for the exploration by Joseph Beete Jukes in 1840. Again, his work contributed to the decision by William Edmond Logan to extend his 1864 geological survey to Newfoundland . It was led by Alexander Murray and James Patrick Howley.

On 22 July 1823, Cormack wrote Lord Bathurst, the British colonial secretary, enclosing a sketch of the interior of the island and a short account of the route followed. He highlighted the plight of the Beothuk and expressed his intention to pursue further inquiries into their condition, as well as to study further the natural resources of the colony.

After returning to Newfoundland, Cormack organized a center devoted to the Beothuk, and began to solicit community support to rescue the remnants of their people from extinction. He founded the Boeothick Institution (now the Beothuk Institute) on 2 October 1827 at Twillingate. His intention was to open communication with the Red Indians of Newfoundland, to promote their civilisation according to British standards, and to learn about their history. Many prominent citizens subscribed to his expedition.

Cormack departed with three native guides, a Canadian Abenaki, a Labrador Montagnais and a young Mi'kmaq, to explore the area around the Exploits River and Red Indian Lake, but found it deserted. As a last resort, the Boeothick Institution sent a native search party to the region of Notre Dame Bay and White Bay, but they encountered no Beothuk. The people were feared to be on the verge of extinction. Although Cormack found many artifacts and other evidence of Beothuk culture, his attempt to locate and save the people from extinction proved unsuccessful.

In the winter of 1828 he learned of Shanawdithit, a young Beothuk woman who was living with settlers in St. John's after having been rescued from starvation. In the winter 1828–1829, Cormack brought her to his centre so he could learn from her. He drew funds from his institute to pay for her support. She drew ten drawings for him of the island, as well as of dwellings, tools and culture of the Beothuk. She taught him some of her vocabulary as she recounted Beothuk history and myths. Already suffering from tuberculosis, she died in the spring of 1829.

In January 1829, after Cormack's business ventures failed, he left Newfoundland. Apart from occasional visits to Britain, and another brief visit to Newfoundland in 1862, Cormack spent his later years in British Columbia on the Pacific Coast. He died, unmarried, at New Westminster, British Columbia.

== Legacy and honors ==
- A monument marks the spot of the beginning of the expedition at Milton in Smith Sound, Trinity Bay.
- A granite cairn was erected in Newfoundland where Cormack and Sylvester crossed what is now the Bay d'Espoir Highway on their way across the vast island.
- Cormack, an inland agricultural community on the banks of the Humber River, established in 1947, was named for him.
- Cormack Street in St. John's is named after him.

== Partial bibliography ==
- Jones, Robert, and W. E. Cormack. The Art of Skating Practically Explained. London: Baily Brothers, 1800.
- Cormack, W. E. Account of a Journey Across the Island of Newfoundland. Edinburgh: Printed for A. Constable, 1824.
- Cormack, W. E. Report of Mr. W.E. Cormack's Journey in Search of the Red Indians in Newfoundland/ Read Before the Bœothick Institution of St. John's, Newfoundland. S.l: s.n, 1828. ISBN 0-665-61101-3
- Cormack, W. E. Narrative of a Journey Across the Island of Newfoundland. St. John's, Nfld.?: s.n.], 1856. ISBN 0-665-22559-8
- Cormack, W. E. Geological Map of N.F. Land Gisbornes. 1800s.
- Howley, James Patrick, and W. E. Cormack. The Beothucks, or Red Indians, The Aboriginal Inhabitants of Newfoundland, Cambridge: University Press, 1915.
