= Vicissitude (1830 ship) =

History

United Kingdom
- Name: Vicissitude
- Owner: 13 March 1830: James Laing & William Anderson, South Shields; 12 June 1830: Rupert Brown, Stepney; registered at London
- Builder: James Laing, South Shields
- Launched: 19 March 1830
- Fate: Wrecked 10 May 1836

General characteristics
- Tons burthen: 24268/94, or 243 (bm)
- Length: 89 ft 9 in (27.4 m)
- Beam: 25 ft 1 in (7.6 m)
- Sail plan: Snow or brig

Vicissitude was launched at Shields in 1830. She traded across the Atlantic but then was wrecked in 1836 in the Maldive Islands.

== Career ==
Vicissitude entered Lloyd's Register in 1830 with C. Brown, master and owner, and trade London–Quebec. In 1832 her trade became London–Porto Bello. Lloyd's Register for 1835 showed her master changing to Snell and her trade to London–Mauritius.

== Loss ==
Vicissitude, Snell, master was wrecked 10 May 1836 at ihavandhippolhu-fulu 6.952°N 72.927°E (Haa Alif Atoll) in the Maldive Islands. She was on a voyage from Mauritius to Calcutta, India. Her crew and cargo were saved.

Lloyd's Register for 1836 has the annotation "LOST" by her name.

The Government of India thanked the Sultan of the Maldives for the "humane and liberal conduct" that he and his subjects extended to the crews of Adonis, which was wrecked in 1835, and Vicissitude. The Sultan accepted some presents as marks of friendship, but declined any payment, though the Government made a liberal offer.
