= David Buchan =

Scottish naval officer (c.1780–1838)

Captain David Buchan
- Born: c. 1780; Scotland
- Died: December 1838; Upton Castle at sea
- Military career
- Allegiance: United Kingdom
- Branch: Royal Navy
- Commands: HMS Adonis; HMS Dorothea; HMS Grasshopper
- Other work: High Sheriff of Newfoundland (1825–1835)

David Buchan (c. 1780 – after 8 December 1838) was a Scottish naval officer and Arctic explorer.

== Family ==
In 1802 or 1803, he married Maria Adye. They had at least three children.

== Exploration ==
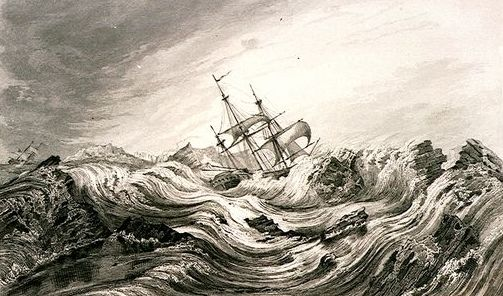
HMS Dorothea shown in The Expedition Driven into the Ice, 30 July 1818 by Frederick William Beechey

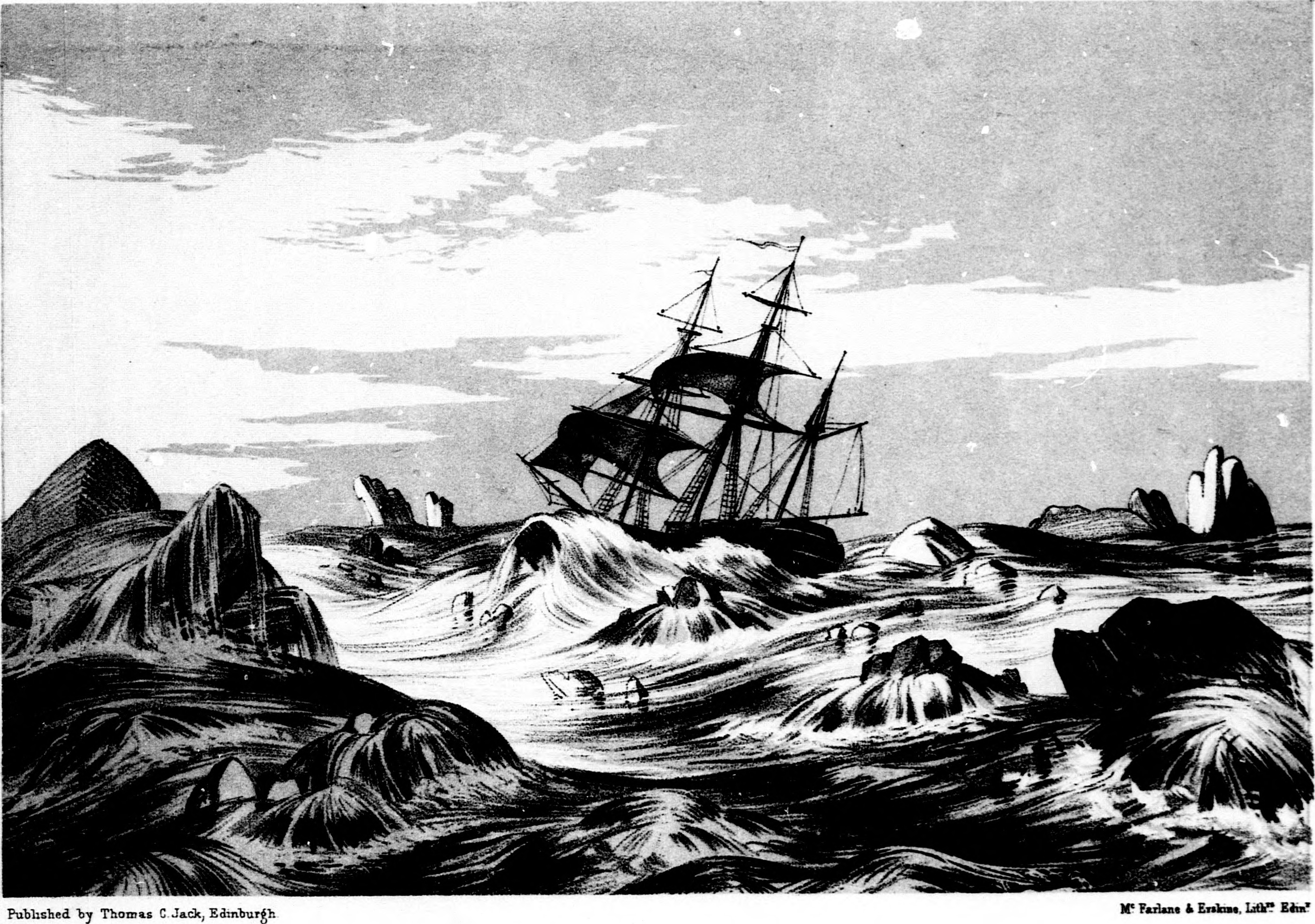
HMS Trent in dangerous waters, 7 June 1818, in Arctic expeditions from British and foreign shores by D. Murray Smith

In 1806, Buchan was appointed as a lieutenant in the Royal Navy, and from about 1808 to 1817 he operated in and around Newfoundland. In 1810 he was captain of HMS Adonis. In autumn 1810 he conducted an expedition to the River of Exploits. From there he and his men marched inland for 130 miles to establish contact with the dwindling native Beothuk population, one of the Indigenous peoples of the Americas in the region. The expedition resulted in the death and decapitation of two marines at their hands.

In 1813, Adonis and the frigate Rosamond escorted the Newfoundland fishing fleet back to Britain. The voyage was stormy and the vessels separated near the English Channel. Adonis regained the convoy but as they approached the Scilly Islands they encountered a French fleet. Adonis was too small meaningfully to defend the convoy and in fact only escaped by jettisoning all her guns.

The 1818 Spitzbergen expedition was nearly the first the many Arctic expeditions that followed the Napoleonic Wars. It set out at the same time as that of John Ross into Baffin Bay. Both were prompted by the interest of John Barrow in Arctic exploration and the fact that in 1817 whalers reported that the normal ice between Greenland and Spitzbergen had disappeared.

The ships were HMS Dorothea (Captain Buchan, first lieutenant Arthur Fleming Morrell, astronomer George Fisher) and HM brig Trent under John Franklin who was later famous for his disappearance in the Arctic. They left London on 4 April 1818 and reached Spitzbergen in June. They found that the ice had returned to normal. They entered Magdalena Bay on the west coast where they were frozen in for a few weeks. Escaping the bay they worked their way north through leads in the ice, often dragging the ships with ropes. By early July they were about 30 miles into the ice and could go no further. They were a little north of 80°, about the same latitude as northernmost Spitzbergen. No European had sailed this far north except William Scoresby. It took only nine days to return to open water, but almost immediately they were hit by a storm which threatened to drive them onto the ice. The storm died down but Dorothea was too damaged to continue in the Arctic. Franklin wanted to continue with Trent but Buchan overruled him. They reached home on 30 September.

Buchan returned to Newfoundland in 1819. Although he intended to return the Beothuk woman Demasduit to her people, she died of tuberculosis before he was able to make any additional contact with the Beothuk. Buchan later ordered additional efforts to return Demasduit's niece, Beothuk woman Shanawdithit, to her family but she refused to go with any European expedition. As far as she knew, all her people had died.

== Later work ==
David Buchan was promoted to captain in the Royal Navy on 12 June 1823, but was removed from the active list the same year. He was appointed High Sheriff of Newfoundland from 1825 to 1835.

== Death ==
In December 1838, he was declared lost at sea with the East Indiaman Upton Castle en route from Calcutta to England.

Civic offices
Preceded by	High Sheriff of Newfoundland; 1825–1835	Succeeded by
