= Victoria River (Newfoundland and Labrador) =

Physical characteristics
- Mouth: Beothuk Lake
  - coordinates: 48.743056°N 56.678889°W
- Length: 137 km (85 mi)

The Victoria River is a tributary of the Exploits River in western Newfoundland, Canada.

The Victoria River flows eastward from the Long Range Mountains into Beothuk Lake, which discharges into the Exploits River. It is 137 km in length.

Mouth of the Victoria River

== See also ==
- List of rivers of Newfoundland and Labrador
- Royal eponyms in Canada
