= George Fisher (scientist) =

The Reverend George Fisher FRS FRAS (31 July 1794 – 14 March 1873) was a British Arctic scientist.

== Early life ==
He was born in Sunbury, Middlesex, England, the son of surveyor James Fisher and his wife Henrietta. In 1808 he became a clerk in the Westminster Fire Insurance Company, at the age of 14. In 1817 he entered St Catharine's College, Cambridge.

== Arctic astronomy ==
In 1818 Fisher was appointed as one of the astronomers for David Buchan's Arctic expedition. His ship, HMS Dorothea, was charged to sail northwards across the pole to the Bering Strait in the belief that the polar ice had retreated. The Dorothea and consort Trent reached their rendezvous at northwest Spitsbergen and set sail northwards on 7 June 1818. They were soon trapped and drifting helplessly in the polar ice and, after freeing themselves, returned home on 30 August. That was the last time Royal Navy vessels attempted to sail across the polar sea. Fisher's scientific data was well received and presented before the Royal Society.

== Greenwich ==
Around 1834 Fisher married Elizabeth Alicia Woosnam; they had two daughters and a son. That year he also accepted the headmastership of the Royal Hospital School at Greenwich where he monitored the construction of an observatory for the next 13 years. He retired in 1863 and died in Rugby, Warwickshire, in 1873.
