= Bay of Exploits =

Coordinates: 49°22′07″N 55°09′00″W

Location of Bay of Exploits in Newfoundland

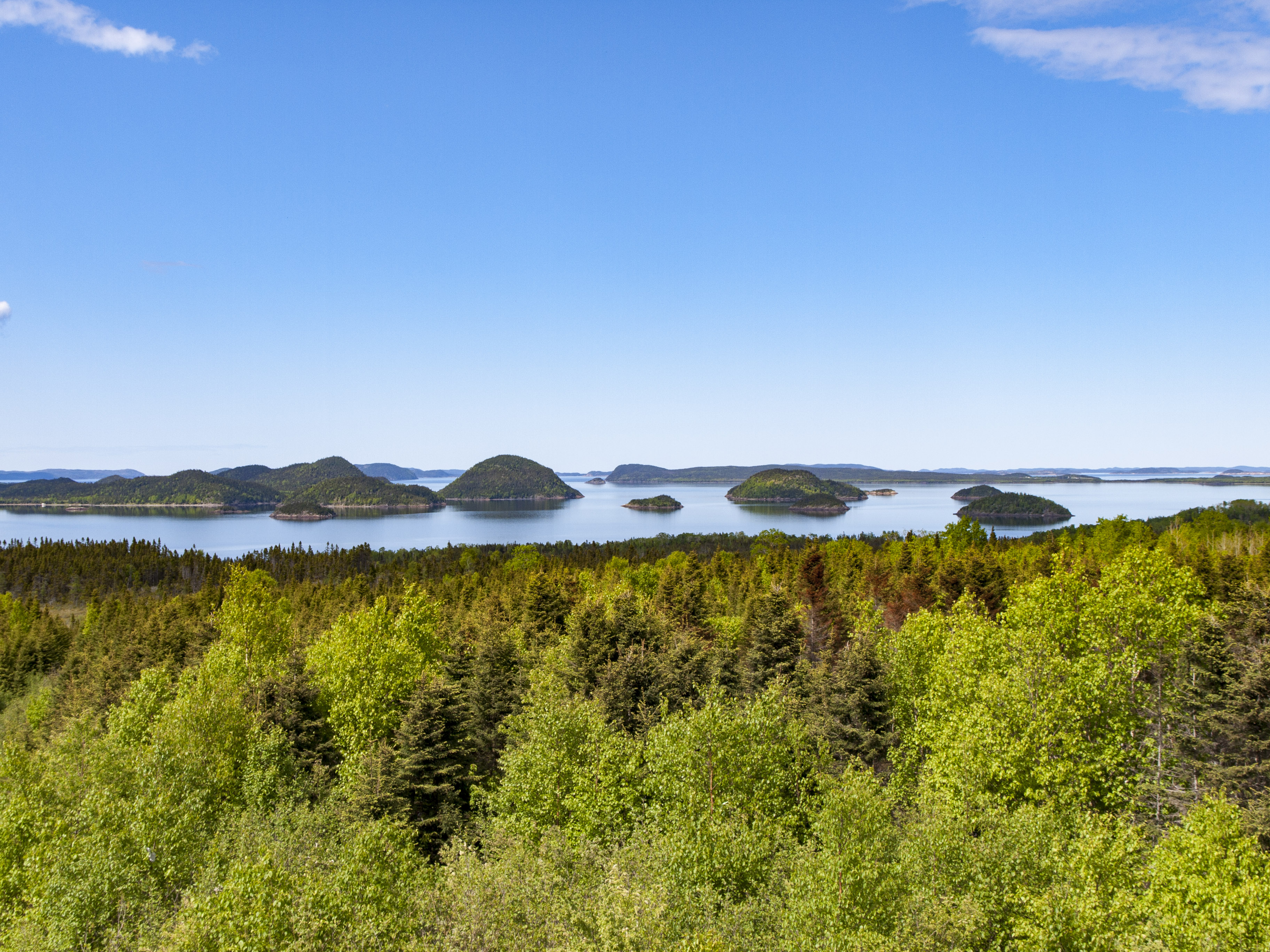
View of the Islands in the Bay of Exploits, Newfoundland.

The Bay of Exploits is a large bay in the northeast of Newfoundland. It extends from the mouth of the Exploits River and opens on to Notre Dame Bay to the north. It is approximately 1,000 square kilometers (386 sq. miles) in size and contains over 30 islands of which New World Island is the largest.

== Description ==
The bay probably got its name from early successful encounters with the Beothuk Indians. The main towns are Lewisporte, Twillingate (on the Twillingate Islands in the bay) and Botwood. Salmon fishing and the fur trade were the main early industries.

== The last of the Beothuk ==
The shores of the Bay of Exploits, the Exploits River and Beothuk Lake at its head, were among the last known haunts of the Beothuk people who generally are thought to have become extinct with the death of Shanawdithit in June 1829, though oral histories contend that a few may have survived for a while longer.
