= Sydney Bennett =

English cricketer

Personal information
- Full name: Sydney John Bennett
- Born: 7 February 1905; Hackleton, Northamptonshire, England
- Died: 15 August 1969 (aged 64); Margate, Kent, England
- Batting: Right-handed
- Bowling: Right-arm slow

Domestic team information
- Years: Team
- 1933–1934: Northamptonshire

Career statistics
Competition	First-class
Matches	3
Runs scored	37
Batting average	7.40
100s/50s	–/–
Top score	19*
Balls bowled	186
Wickets	2
Bowling average	53.50
5 wickets in innings	–
10 wickets in match	–
Best bowling	1/40
Catches/stumpings	–/–
- Source: Cricinfo, 18 November 2011

Sydney John Bennett (7 February 1905 – 15 August 1969) was an English cricketer. Bennett was a right-handed batsman who bowled right-arm slow. He was born at Hackleton, Northamptonshire.

Bennett made three first-class appearances for Northamptonshire, two in the 1933 County Championship against Nottinghamshire and Derbyshire, and one in the 1934 County Championship against Leicestershire. In his three first-class matches, he scored 37 runs at an average of 7.40, with a high score of 19 not out. With the ball he took 2 wickets at a bowling average of 53.50, with best figures of 1/40.

He died at Margate, Kent on 15 August 1969.
