= Beothuk Lake =

Lake in Newfoundland, Canada

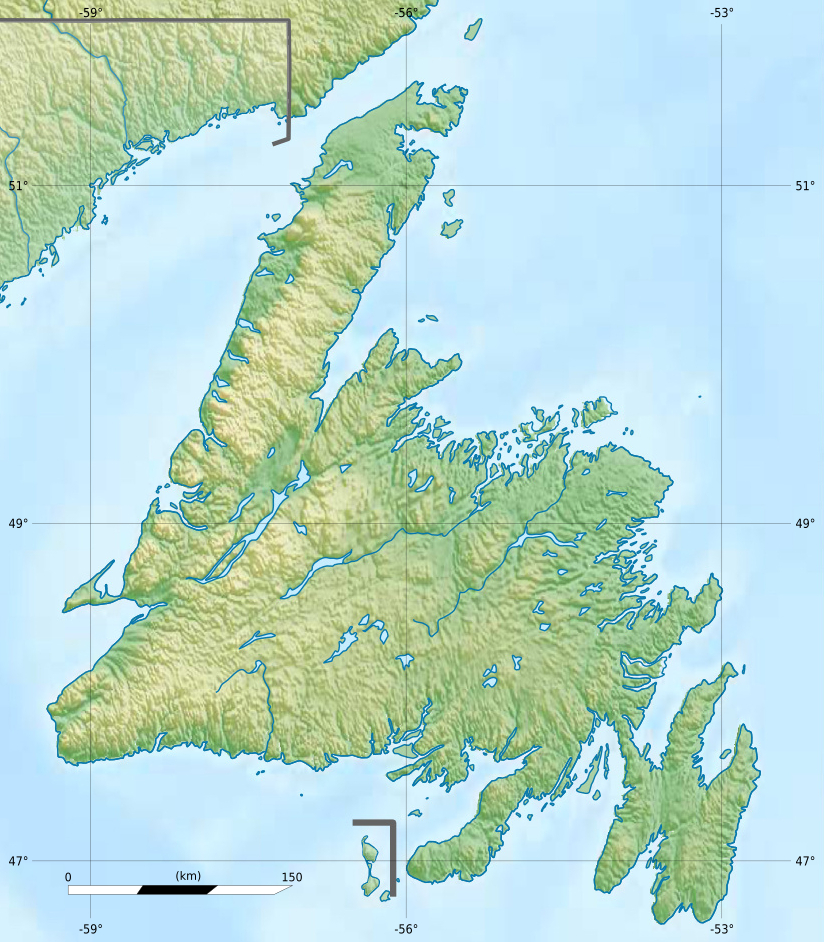
- Location within Newfoundland
- Location: Newfoundland, Canada
- Coordinates: 48°44′21″N 56°50′47″W
- Primary outflows: Exploits River
- Basin countries: Canada

Beothuk Lake, formerly Red Indian Lake, is located in the interior of central Newfoundland in the province of Newfoundland and Labrador, Canada. The lake drains into the Exploits River which flows through the interior of Newfoundland and exits into the Atlantic Ocean through the Bay of Exploits. Lloyds River, the Victoria River and Star River feed into the lake.

== History ==
The Beothuk inhabited several campsites on the shore of the lake. An expedition into the interior by John Cartwright and brother George Cartwright in search of the Beothuk found only abandoned campsites. At the time of their discovery of the lake they named it Lieutenant's Lake.

In January 1811, an expedition led by David Buchan travelled up the Exploits River in an attempt to establish friendly relations with the Beothuk; Buchan found them, but the encounter went badly and resulted in the deaths of two marines. John Peyton Jr. led another expedition to the lake in 1819 which also ended in tragedy; the expedition resulted in the death of the Beothuk headman Nonosabasut and the capture of Demasduit.

Cartwright's earlier expedition was the first in a series of efforts by officials throughout the late 1700s and early 1800s to establish friendly contact with the Beothuk people. During this period, out of respect for the Beothuk, the lake was renamed Red Indian Lake from the term "Red Indians" which European settlers used for the Beothuk; this term arose from the Beothuk practice of applying red ochre dye to their bodies and possessions.

=== Renaming ===
On April 21, 2021, provincial Indigenous Affairs Minister Lisa Dempster tabled a motion in the House of Assembly and announced that the Government of Newfoundland and Labrador would change the name of the Lake to "Wantaqo'ti Qospem", which means "peaceful lake" in the Mi'kmaq language.

Freedom of Information requests made by the Canadian Press later revealed that the Deputy Minister of Indigenous Affairs wrote to the Miawpukek first nation (located on the south coast of Newfoundland) on April 15 seeking a new name for Red Indian Lake and that in less than a week Chief Mi'sel Joe of Miawpukek First Nation had made the suggestion that was included in the motion. The same request revealed that when writing to Miawukek First Nation, the Deputy Minister stated that Premier Andrew Furey "would like to get moving on this ASAP."

However, following petitions, protest and more than 170 pages of emails expressing objections and concern over a lack of consultation, particularly with residents of local communities in the vicinity of the lake (including members of the Qalipu first nation), the provincial government announced it was pausing the renaming plans and would be opening a consultation process on the name. Concerns were also raised about whether a Mi'kmaq name would be appropriate for a lake in traditional Beothuk territory. Arguments against any change to the lake's name included reference to Canada's geographical naming protocols, which prioritize the views of those people who live closest to the geographical feature to be renamed. Objectors also cited indigenous language guides that allow for historical and legacy names, terms and references. No report on the results of the provincial government consultation was ever published or shared publicly.

In October 2021, the Newfoundland and Labrador House of Assembly introduced legislation to officially rename the lake as "Beothuk Lake". The legislation was passed on November 4, 2021.

== Economy and resources ==
The interior of Newfoundland became accessible on the completion of the Newfoundland Railway, and the forest surrounding the lake attracted attention. The lake was surveyed in 1899 by Alex McCombie and by 1901 Lewis Miller had set up a logging operation on the shore near the site of Demasduit's capture. A railway branch line to the town of Millertown was constructed, and in 1905 the Anglo-Newfoundland Development (AND) Company acquired a 99-year lease on timber and mineral rights for the land surrounding the lake.

Prospector, Guide and Trapper Matty Mitchell is credited with discovering a large high grade base metal deposit on the banks of the Buchans River on the north side of the lake. He was working for the AND Company at the time. ANDco mined bulk samples seasonally at the site from 1906 to 1911. Metallurgical methods would have to improve in order to be able to mine and process the deposit. Improved processes were discovered in 1925. Further exploration in 1926 led to more discoveries and a partnership between the mineral rights holding ANDco and the American Smelting and Refining Company (Asarco). Mining operations commenced in 1927 as did the construction of the town of Buchans.

== Reservoir ==
The Exploits River was dammed in the early 1900s, initially in support of the Millertown logging operation. In 1909, a pulp and paper mill was constructed at Grand Falls, further downstream on the Exploits River. A new larger dam was constructed at the outflow of the lake, creating a vast storage reservoir for a hydroelectric generating plant at the mill in Grand Falls. Exploits dam was enhanced or reconstructed multiple times in the period from 1912 to 1926.
