= Shanawdithit =

Last known Beothuk woman (c. 1801 – 1829)

- Born: Shanawdithit ca. 1801; Newfoundland
- Died: June 6, 1829 (aged 27–28); St. John's, Newfoundland
- Cause of death: Tuberculosis
- Other names: Shawnadithit, Shawnawdithit, Nancy April
- Known for: last Beothuk

Shanawdithit (ca. 1801 – June 6, 1829), also noted as Shawnadithit, Shawnawdithit, Nancy April and Nancy Shanawdithit, was the last known living member of the Beothuk people, who inhabited Newfoundland, Canada. Remembered for her contributions to the historical understanding of Beothuk culture, including drawings depicting interactions with European settlers, Shanawdithit died of tuberculosis in St. John's, Newfoundland on June 6, 1829.

== Early life with the Beothuk ==
Shanawdithit was born near a large lake on the island of Newfoundland in about 1801. At the time the Beothuk population was dwindling, their traditional way of life becoming increasingly unsustainable in the face of encroachment from both European colonial settlements and other Indigenous peoples, as well as infectious diseases from Europe such as smallpox against which they had little or no immunity. The Beothuks were also slowly being cut off from the sea, one of their food sources.

During this period, most Indigenous nations in the Americas tolerated some level of contact with European settlers. The resulting trade generally afforded them the opportunity to maintain at least a minimal standard of living. In contrast, Beothuks had long avoided this sort of interaction with outsiders. Trappers and furriers regarded the Beothuks as thieves and would sometimes attack them. As a child, Shanawdithit was shot by a white trapper while washing venison in a river. She suffered from the injury for some time, but recovered.

In 1819, Shanawdithit's aunt Demasduit was captured by a party of settlers led by John Peyton Jr. and the few remaining Beothuks fled. In the spring of 1823, Shanawdithit's father died after falling through ice. Most of her extended family had already died from a combination of starvation, illness, exposure and attacks from European settlers. In April 1823, Shanawdithit, along with her mother, Doodebewshet, and her sister, whose Beothuk name is unknown, encountered trappers while searching for food in the Badger Bay area. William Cull and the three women were taken to St. John's, where Shanawdithit's mother and sister died of tuberculosis.

== Later life in the Newfoundland Colony ==
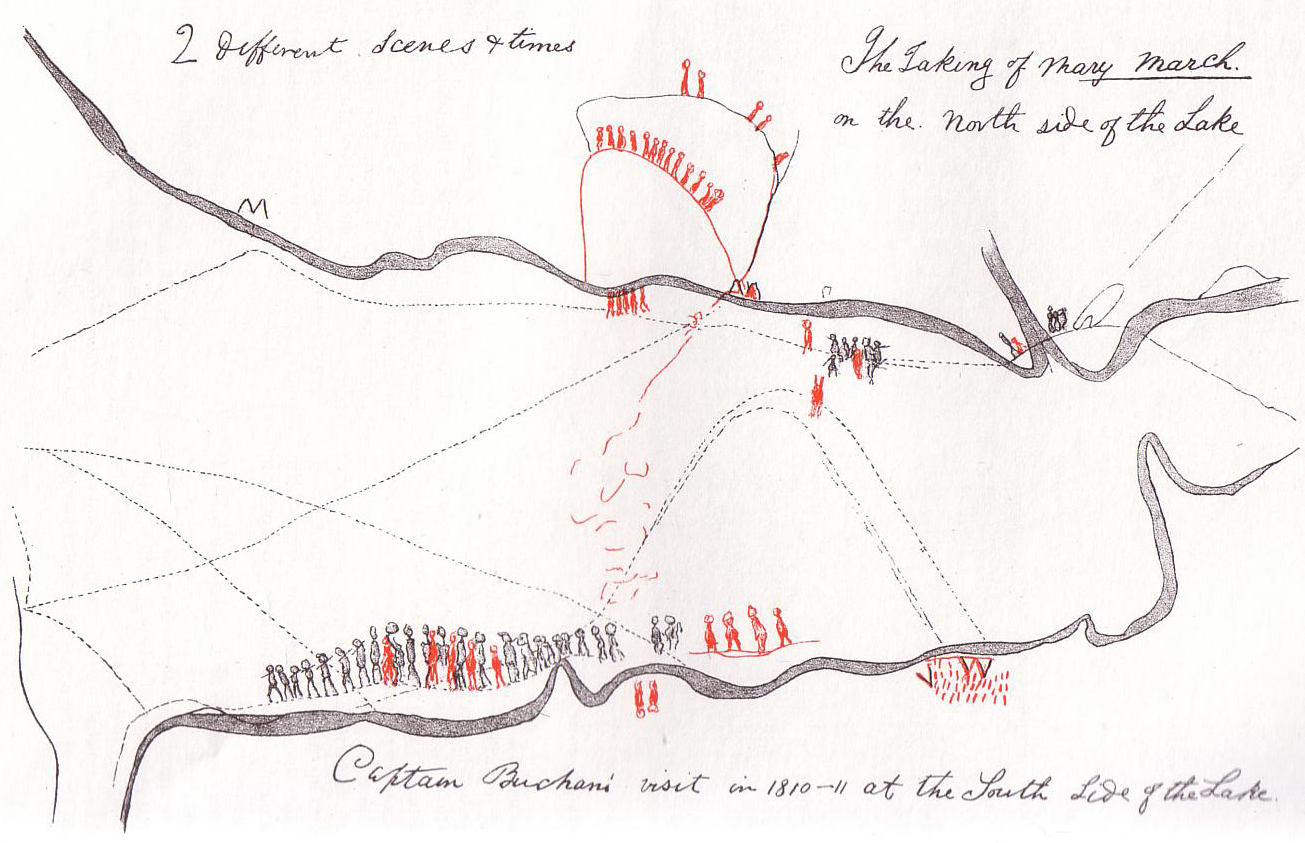
Shanawdithit's drawing of the taking of Demasduit featuring annotations by Cormack

The settlers in the Newfoundland Colony renamed Shanawdithit "Nancy April" after the month in which she was captured, taking her to Exploits Island where she worked as a servant in the Peyton household and learned some English. The colonial government hoped she would become a bridge to her people, but she refused to leave with any expedition, saying the Beothuks would kill anyone who had been with the Europeans, as a kind of religious sacrifice and redemption for those who had been killed.

In September 1828, Shanawdithit was relocated to St. John's to live in the household of William Eppes Cormack, the founder of the Beothuk Institution. A Scottish emigrant, Newfoundland entrepreneur and philanthropist, he recorded much of what Shanawdithit told him about her people and added notes to her drawings. Shanawdithit stayed in Cormack's care until early 1829 when he left Newfoundland. Cormack returned to Great Britain where he stayed for some time in Liverpool with John McGregor, a Scotsman whom he had known in Canada, sharing many of his materials on the Beothuks.

Following Cormack's departure, Shanawdithit was cared for by the attorney general, James Simms. She spent the last nine months of her life at his home, having been in frail health for a number of years. William Carson tended her, but in 1829, Shanawdithit died in a St. John's hospital after her long fight with tuberculosis. In addition to an obituary announcement in a local St. John's newspaper on June 12, 1829, the death of Shanawdithit was reported in the London Times on September 14, 1829. The announcement noted that Shanawdithit "exhibited extraordinary strong natural talents" and identified the Beothuk as "an anomaly in the history of man" for not establishing or maintaining relationships with European settlers or other Indigenous peoples.

== After her death ==
After Shanawdithit's death Carson performed a postmortem and noted peculiarities with the parietal bone of her skull, eventually sending her skull to the Royal College of Physicians in London for study. Shanawdithit's remains were buried in the graveyard of St. Mary the Virgin Church on the south side of St. John's. In 1938, the Royal College of Physicians gave her skull to the Royal College of Surgeons. It was lost in the German Blitz bombing of London in World War II.

Meanwhile, in 1903, the church graveyard had been lost to railway construction. The church was torn down in 1963. A monument on the site reads: "This monument marks the site of the Parish Church of St. Mary the Virgin during the period 1859–1963. Fishermen and sailors from many ports found a spiritual haven within its hallowed walls. Near this spot is the burying place of Nancy Shanawdithit, very probably the last of the Beothuks, who died on June 6, 1829".

== Legacy ==
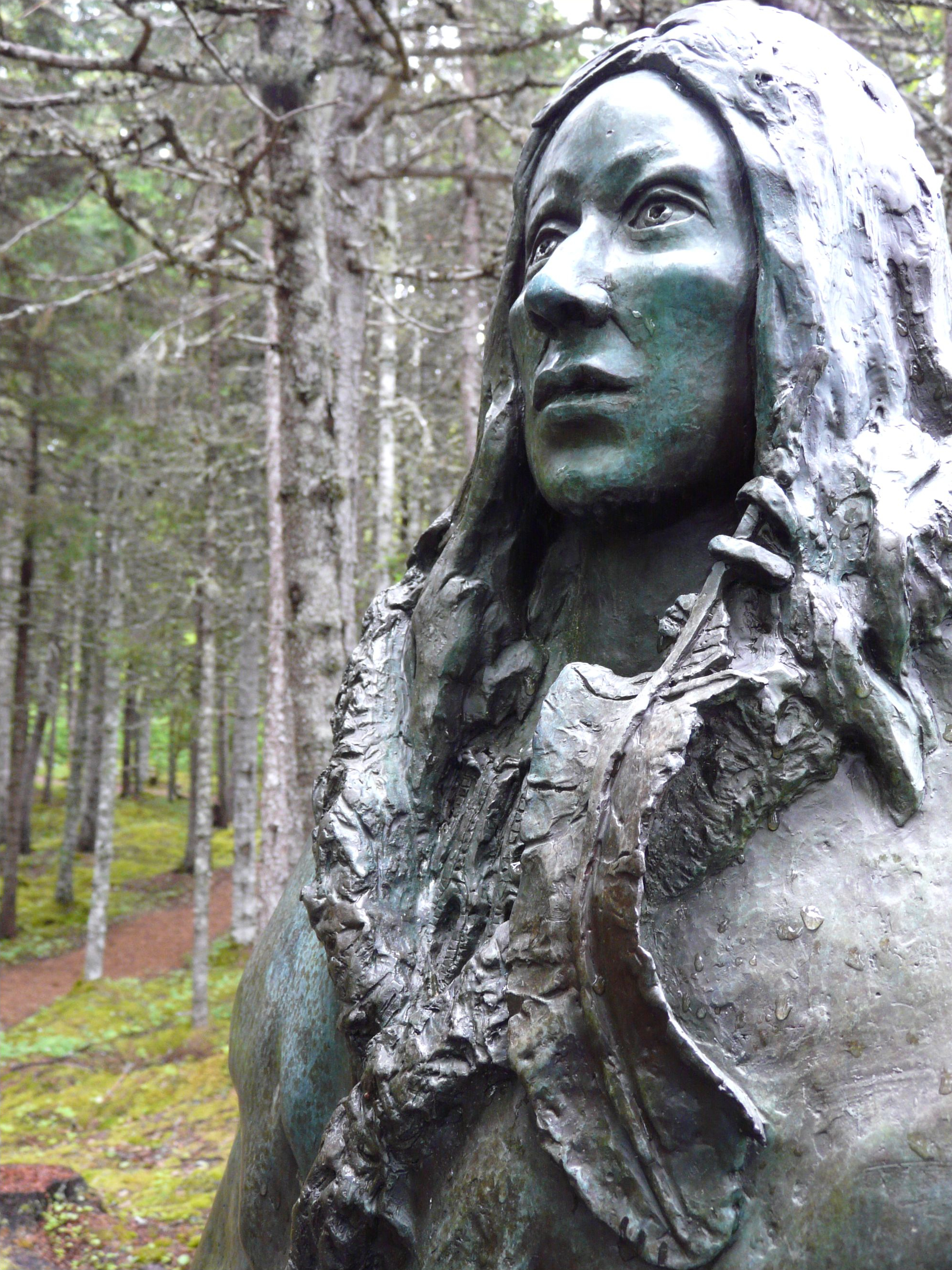
Statue in Boyd's Cove

Shanawdithit played a vital role in documenting what little is known about the Beothuk people. Researcher Ingeborg Marshall has argued that a valid understanding of Beothuk history and culture is affected directly by how historical records were created and who created them, pointing to the ethnocentric nature of European accounts which positioned native populations as inherently inferior. She notes that without Shanawdithit's accounts of her nation's later life, the Beothuk voice is nearly absent from historical accounts.

Shanawdithit was recognized as a National Historic Person in 2000. The announcement coincided with the installation of a statue depicting Shanawdithit by Gerald Squires, titled The Spirit of the Beothuk, at the Beothuk Interpretation Centre near Boyd's Cove. In 2007 a plaque commemorating her life was unveiled at St. John's Bannerman Park acknowledging her contributions to the historical accounts of encounters between the Beothuk and European settlers, and the apprehension of her aunt, Demasduit, by John Peyton Jr.

Shanawdithit is widely known among Newfoundlanders. In 1851, a local paper, the Newfoundlander, called her "a princess of Terra Nova". In 1999, The Telegram readers voted her the most notable Aboriginal person of the past 1,000 years. She had 57% of the votes.

Her story was the basis for the 2023 College of the North Atlantic Digital Filmmaking program's intersession film project.

== See also ==
- Notable Aboriginal people of Canada
- List of people of Newfoundland and Labrador
- Shanawdithit and Demasduit, the last members of the Beothuk people of Newfoundland and Labrador
- Ishi, the last known member of the Yahi people of California
- Squanto, the last member of the Patuxet people of Massachusetts
- Man of the Hole, last member of an uncontacted people of Brazil
- Juana Maria, the last known member of the Nicoleño tribe
