= Beothuk =

Historical Indigenous people of Newfoundland

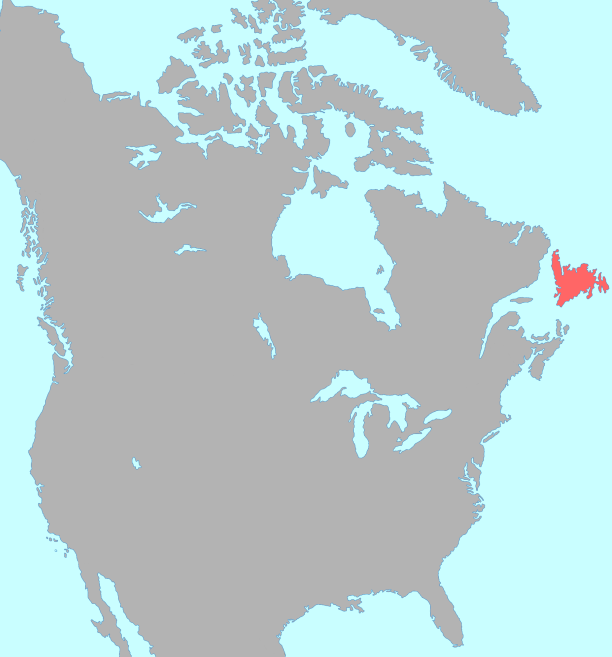
Newfoundland, the historic home of the Beothuk

The Beothuk (/biːˈɒtək/ or /ˈbeɪ.əθʊk/; also spelled Beothuck) were a group of Indigenous people who lived on the island of Newfoundland. They were declared extinct in 1829.

The Beothuk culture formed around AD 1500. This may have been the most recent cultural manifestation of peoples who first migrated from Labrador to present-day Newfoundland around AD 1. The ancestors of this group had three earlier cultural phases, each lasting approximately 500 years.

== Description ==
The Beothuk lived throughout the island of Newfoundland, mostly in the Notre Dame and Bonavista Bay areas. Estimates of the Beothuk population at the time of contact with Europeans vary. Historian of the Beothuk Ingeborg Marshall argued that European historical records of Beothuk history are clouded by ethnocentrism and unreliable. Scholars from the 19th and early 20th century estimated about 2,000 Beothuk individuals lived at the time of European contact in the 15th century; however, there may have been no more than 500 to 700 people. Based on the carrying capacity of the ecosystem at the time of contact the population is estimated to have been between 1,000 and 1,500. They lived in independent, self-sufficient, extended family groups of 30 to 55 people.

Like many other hunter-gatherers, they appear to have had band leaders but probably not more formal chiefs, in the anthropological definition of the word. They lived in conical dwellings known as mamateeks, which were fortified for the winter season. These were constructed by arranging poles in a circle, tying them at the top, and covering them with birch bark. The floors were dug with hollows used for sleeping. A fireplace was made at the centre.

During spring, the Beothuk used red ochre to paint not only their bodies but also their houses, canoes, weapons, household appliances, and musical instruments. This practice led Europeans to refer to them as "Red Indians". The use of ochre had great cultural significance. The decorating was done during an annual multi-day spring celebration. It designated tribal identity; for example, decorating newborn children was a way to welcome them into the tribe. Forbidding a person to wear ochre was a form of punishment.

Their main food were caribou, salmon, and seals, augmented by harvesting other animal and plant species. The Beothuk followed the seasonal migratory habits of their principal quarry. In the fall, they set up deer fences, sometimes 48–64 km (30–40 mi) long, used to drive migrating caribou toward waiting hunters armed with bows and arrows.

The Beothuk are also known to have made a pudding out of tree sap and the dried yolk of the eggs of the great auk. They preserved surplus food for use during winter, trapped various fur-bearing animals, and worked their skins for warm clothing. The fur side was worn next to the skin, to trap air against a person's body.

Beothuk canoes were made of caribou or seal skin, and the bows of canoes were stiffened with spruce bark. Canoes resembled kayaks and were said to be 4.6 m (15 ft) in length and 0.76 m (2 1/2 ft) in width with enough room to carry children, dogs, and property.

The Beothuk followed elaborate burial practices. After wrapping the bodies in birch bark, they buried the dead in isolated locations, often in caves or under rock overhangs on smaller islands. In one form, a shallow grave was covered with a rock pile. At other times they laid the body on a scaffold, or placed it in a burial box, with the knees folded. The survivors placed offerings at burial sites to accompany the dead, such as figurines, pendants, and replicas of tools.

== European exploration ==
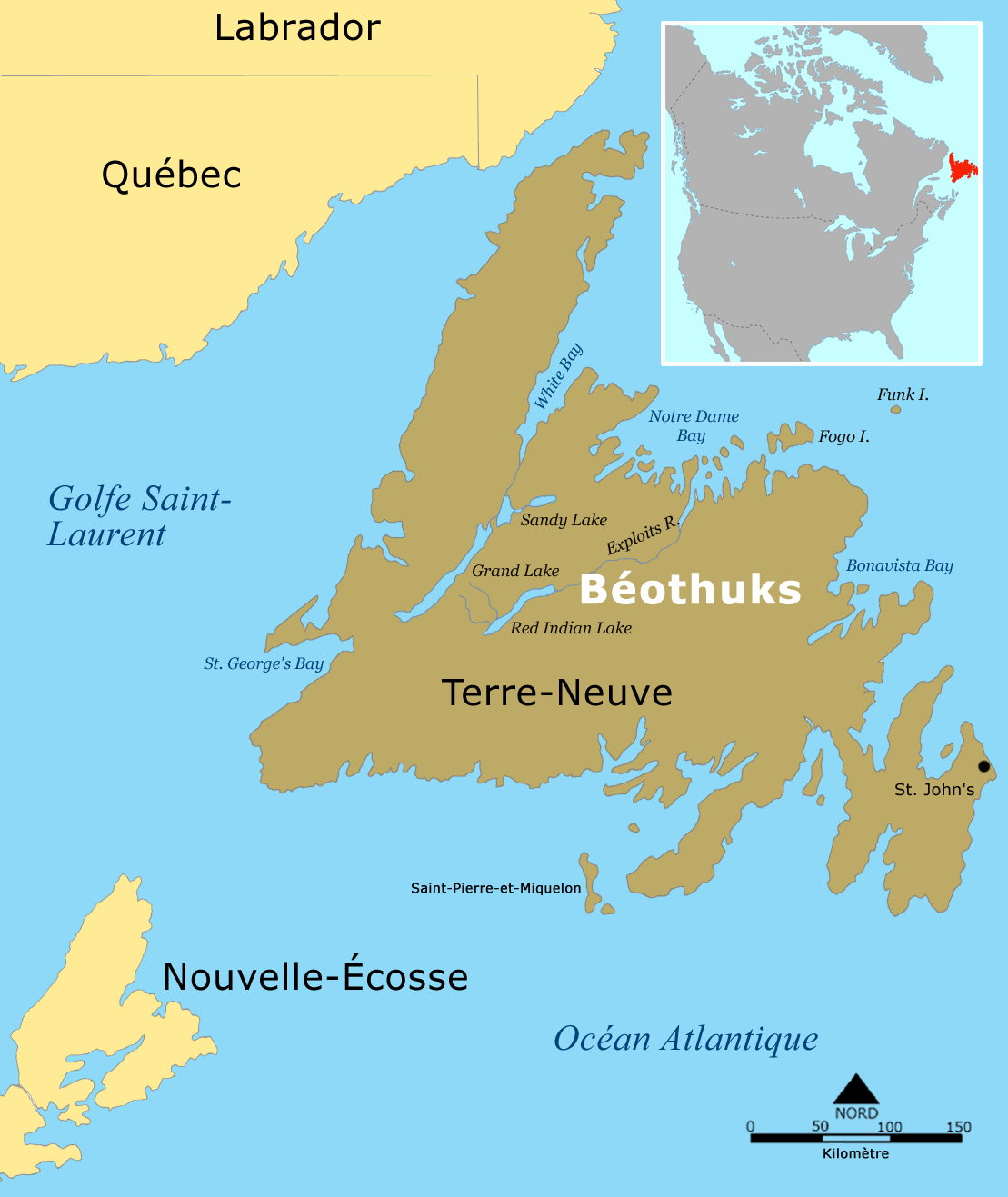
Tribal territory of Beothuk

About AD 1000, Norse explorers led by Leif Erikson encountered Indigenous people in northern Newfoundland, who may have been ancestors of the later Beothuk, or Dorset inhabitants of Labrador and Newfoundland. The Norse called them skrælingjar ("skraelings"). Beginning in 1497, with the arrival of the Italian explorer John Cabot, sailing under the auspices of King Henry VII, waves of European explorers and settlers had more contacts.

Unlike some other Indigenous groups, the Beothuk tried to avoid contact with Europeans; they moved inland as European settlements grew. The Beothuk visited their former camps only to pick up metal objects. They would also collect any tools, shelters, and building materials left by the European fishermen who had dried and cured their catch before taking it to Europe at the end of the season. Contact between Europeans and the Beothuk was usually negative for one side, with a few exceptions like John Guy's party in 1612. Settlers and the Beothuk competed for natural resources, such as salmon, seals, and birds. In the interior, fur trappers established traplines, disrupted the caribou hunts, and ransacked Beothuk stores, camps, and supplies. The Beothuk would steal traps to reuse the metals, and steal from the homes and shelters of European settlers and sometimes ambush them. These encounters led to enmity and mutual violence. With superior arms technology, the settlers generally had the upper hand in hunting and warfare. (Unlike other Native American peoples, the Beothuk appeared to have had no interest in adopting firearms.)

Intermittently, Europeans attempted to improve relations with the Beothuk. Examples included expeditions by army officer George Cartwright and his brother naval officer John Cartwright in 1768, and naval lieutenant David Buchan in 1811. Cartwright's 1768 expedition was commissioned by Governor Hugh Palliser; he found no Beothuk, but brought back important cultural information. Governor John Duckworth commissioned Buchan's 1811 expedition. Although undertaken for information gathering, the expedition ended in violence. Buchan's party encountered several Beothuk near Beothuk Lake. After an initially friendly reception, Buchan left two of his men behind with the Beothuk. The next day, he found them murdered and mutilated. According to the Beothuk Shanawdithit's later account, the marines were killed when one refused to give up his jacket and both ran away.

== Causes of starvation ==
The Beothuks avoided Europeans in Newfoundland by moving inland from their traditional settlements. First, they emigrated to different coastal areas of Newfoundland, places the Europeans did not have fish-camps, but they were over-run. Then, they emigrated to inland Newfoundland. The Beothuks' main food sources were caribou, fish, and seals; their forced displacement deprived them of two of these. This led to the over-hunting of caribou, leading to a decrease in the caribou population in Newfoundland. The Beothuks emigrated from their traditional land and lifestyle into ecosystems unable to support them, causing under-nourishment and, eventually, starvation.

== Extinction ==
Population estimates of Beothuks remaining at the end of the first decade of the 19th century vary widely, from about 150 up to 3,000. Information about the Beothuk was based on accounts by the woman Shanawdithit, who told about the people who "wintered on the Exploits River or at Red Indian Lake and resorted to the coast in Notre Dame Bay". References in records also noted some survivors on the Northern Peninsula in the early 19th century.

During the colonial period, the Beothuk people faced territorial pressure from other Indigenous groups: Mi'kmaq migrants from Cape Breton Island, and Inuit from Labrador. "The Beothuk were unable to procure sufficient subsistence within the areas left to them." It has been alleged French bounties induced the Mi'kmaq to kill Beothuk. This claim is, however, disputed by most historians and has since come to be known as the "Mercenary Myth".

Beothuk numbers dwindled rapidly due to a combination of factors, including: loss of access to important food sources, from the competition with and displacement by Europeans; infectious diseases to which they had no immunity, such as smallpox, introduced by European contact; endemic tuberculosis (TB), which weakened tribal members; and violent encounters with trappers and settlers.

By 1829, with the death of Shanawdithit, the people were declared extinct.

=== Claims of modern survivors ===
Oral histories suggest a few Beothuk survived around the region of the Exploits River, Twillingate, Newfoundland and Labrador; it was also suggested that this population formed unions with Europeans, Inuit and Mi'kmaq. Some families in the Twillingate area claim descent from the Beothuk people of the early 19th century.

In 1910, a 75-year-old Indigenous woman named Santu Toney claimed she was the daughter of a Mi'kmaq mother and a Beothuk father. She recorded a song in the Beothuk language for the American anthropologist Frank Speck. He was conducting field studies in the area. She said her father taught her the song.

Since Santu Toney was born about 1835, this may be evidence some Beothuk people survived beyond the death of Shanawdithit in 1829. Contemporary researchers tried to transcribe the song, as well as improve the recording by current methods. Native groups learned the song to use in celebrations of tradition.

=== Claims of genocide ===
Scholars disagree in their definition of "genocide" in relation to the Beothuk. While some scholars believe the Beothuk died out as an unintended consequence of European colonization, others argue Europeans conducted a sustained campaign of genocide against them. Historian Mohamed Adhikari argued there was an intentional nature of destructive violence from European forces, and this is part of the evidence that makes this a case of genocide. Legal historian Sydney Harring argued there are parallels between the violence inflicted upon the Beothuk and the genocidal violence inflicted upon the Aboriginal Tasmanians, and also proposes the government's knowledge of such violence while not actively and successfully preventing and stopping it implies a tacit approval of the violence.

Writing in 1766, Governor Hugh Palliser reported to the British Secretary of State for the Northern Department, Augustus FitzRoy, 3rd Duke of Grafton, that "the barbarous system of killing prevails amongst our people towards the Native Indians — whom our People always kill, when they can meet them".

If such a campaign did occur, it was explicitly without official sanction after 1769. In that year, Governor John Byron's proclamation explicitly prohibited such conduct: "I do strictly enjoin and require all His Majesty's subjects to live in amity and brotherly kindness with the native savages [Beothuk] of the said island of Newfoundland", A subsequent Proclamation issued by Governor John Holloway on July 30, 1807 prohibited mistreatment of the Beothuk and offered a reward for any information on such mistreatment.

There are various accounts of violence by Europeans directed against the Beothuk. In 1792, British navy Lieutenant George Pulling collected numerous accounts of the interactions between settlers and the Beothuk, many of which ended violently. One significant example was a raid which occurred in the winter of 1781, in which John Peyton Sr., who was involved in multiple acts of violence against the Beothuk, led two other men in an expedition up the Exploits River, to recover fishing gear and other material believed taken by the Beothuk. Pulling noted two accounts of this event, one directly from one of the participants and another second-hand from Peyton Sr. himself. After three days, they came upon a Beothuk encampment (of likely 30 to 50 people); Peyton Sr. and his men fired on the Beothuk, killing some and wounding others, with the exact number of victims unknown. There was at least one uninjured survivor, and Peyton Sr. is recorded as having beaten an injured Beothuk to death with an animal trap. The surviving Beothuk who were able fled, and Peyton and his men collected what furs, skins and gear they could carry and left. Pulling believed both versions of the story left out significant details of what had occurred.

== Notable Beothuk captives ==
Several Beothuk were captured by settlers from the Newfoundland Colony during the early 19th century.

=== Demasduit ===
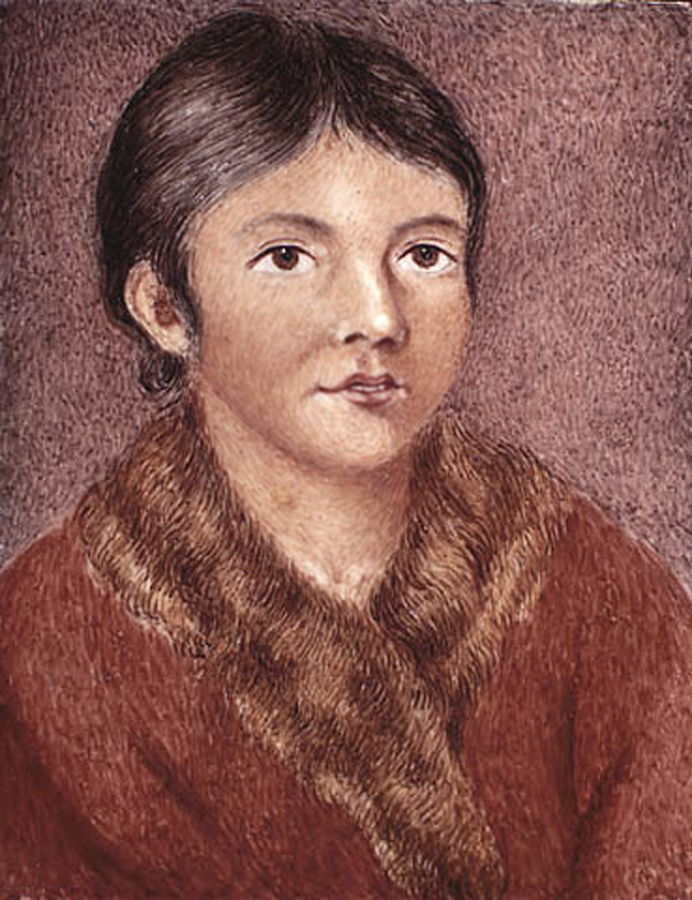
Demasduit, 1819

Demasduit was a Beothuk woman, about 23 years old at the time she was captured by a party led by the fisherman John Peyton Jr. near Beothuk Lake in March 1819.

The governor of the Newfoundland colony was seeking to encourage trade and end hostilities with the Beothuk. He approved an expedition, to be led by the Scottish explorer David Buchan, to recover a boat and other fishing gear foraged by the Beothuk. Buchan was accompanied by two soldiers; the Beothuk mistakenly thought Buchan had hostile intentions and killed and decapitated the soldiers accompanying him.

An armed party led by Peyton Jr, totaling about nine men (including John Peyton Sr.), came upon a Beothuk camp looking for stolen fishing gear. The Beothuk scattered, although Demasduit was unable to escape and begged for mercy, exposing her breasts to show she was a nursing mother with child. Her husband, Nonosabasut, confronted Peyton Jr. and his party, attempting to negotiate for the release of his wife. A fight occurred between Peyton Sr. and Nonosabasut, resulting in the death of the latter. Peyton Jr. and his party took Demasduit to Twillingate, with her baby dying before they reached the settlement.

The settlers at the Newfoundland colony named Demasduit Mary March after the month she was taken. Government agents took her to St. John's, Newfoundland. The colonial government hoped to make Demasduit comfortable while she was living in the colony so she might be a bridge between them and the Beothuk. Demasduit learned some English, and taught the settlers about 200 words of the Beothuk language. In January 1820, Demasduit was released to rejoin her people; however, she died of tuberculosis on the voyage to Notre Dame Bay.

=== Shanawdithit ===
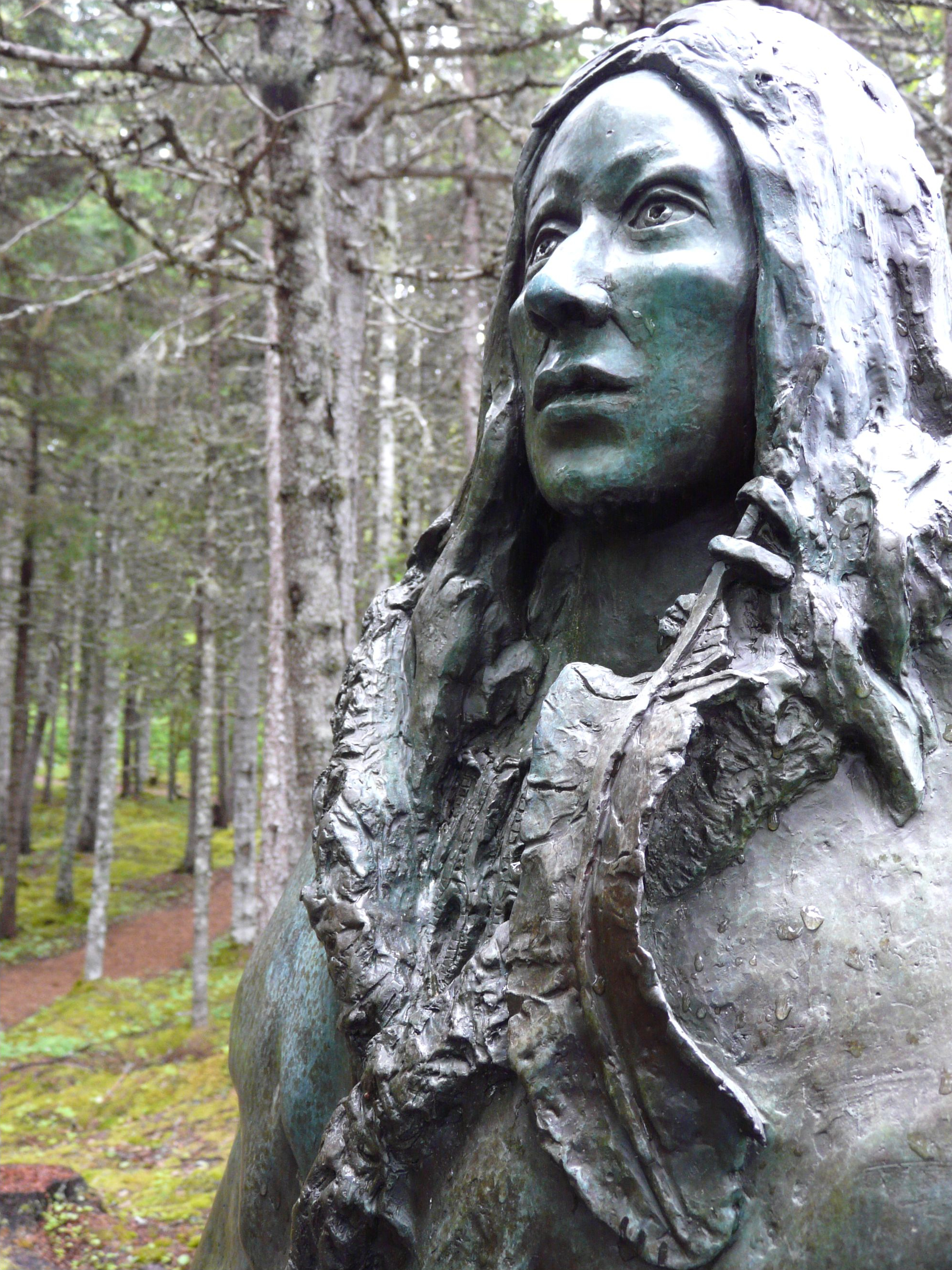
Statue of Shanawdithit in Boyd's Cove

Shanawdithit was Demasduit's niece and the last known full-blooded Beothuk. In April 1823, she was in her early twenties. She, her mother, and sister sought food and help from a white trapper, as they were starving. The three were taken to St. John's, but her mother and sister died of tuberculosis, an epidemic among the First Nations. Called Nancy April by the settlers, Shanawdithit lived for several years in the home of John Peyton Jr. as a servant.

The explorer William Cormack founded the Beothuk Institute in 1827 to foster friendly dealings with the Beothuk and support their culture. His expeditions found Beothuk artifacts but he also learned the society was dying out. Learning of Shanawdithit, in the winter 1828–1829, Cormack brought her to his centre so he could learn from her. He drew funds from his institute to pay for her support.

Shanawdithit made ten drawings for Cormack. Some of the drawings showed parts of the island, while others illustrated Beothuk implements and dwellings, along with Beothuk notions and myths. As she explained her drawings, she taught Cormack Beothuk vocabulary. She told him there were far fewer Beothuk than twenty years previously. To her knowledge, at the time she was taken, only a dozen Beothuk survived. Despite medical care from the doctor William Carson, Shanawdithit died of tuberculosis in St. John's on June 6, 1829. At the time, there was no European cure for the disease.

== Archaeology ==
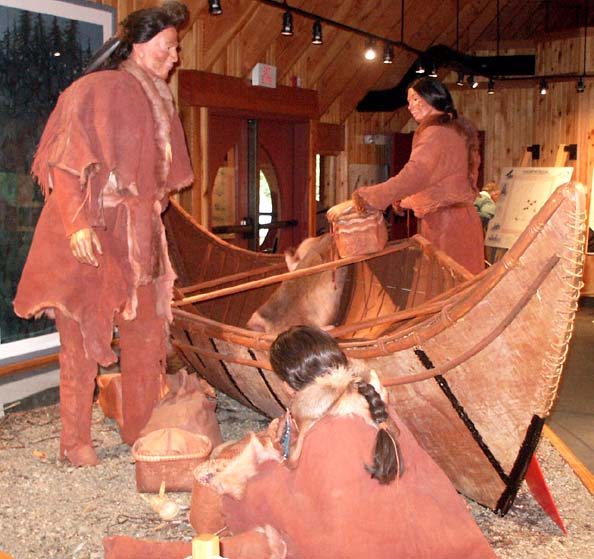
The Beothuk tribe of Newfoundland is extinct as a cultural group. It is represented in museum, historical and archaeological records.

The area around eastern Notre Dame Bay, on the northeast coast of Newfoundland, contains numerous archeological sites containing material from Indigenous cultures. One of these is the Boyd's Cove site. At the foot of a bay, it is protected by a maze of islands sheltering it from waves and winds. The site was found in 1981 during an archeological survey to locate Beothuk sites to study their artifacts for insight into Beothuk culture.

Records and information were limited, therefore some questions about the people could not be answered because few record-keeping Europeans contacted the Beothuk. By contrast, peoples such as the Huron or the Mi'kmaq interacted with the French missionaries, who studied and taught them and had extensive trade with French, Dutch, and English merchants – all of whom made records of their encounters.

There are references that document Beothuk presence in the region of Notre Dame Bay in the last half of the 18th and early part of the 19th century. Previous archaeological surveys and amateur finds indicate it was likely the Beothuk lived in the area prior to European encounter. Eastern Notre Dame Bay is rich in animal and fish life: seals, fish, and seabirds, and its hinterland supported large caribou herds.

Archaeologists found sixteen Indigenous sites, ranging in age from the Maritime Archaic era (7000 BC – modern) through the Palaeo-Eskimo period, down to the Recent Indigenous (including the Beothuk) occupation. Two of the sites are associated with the historical Beothuk. Boyd's Cove, the larger of the two, is 3,000 m^{2} (32,000 sq ft) and is on top of a 6 m (20 ft) glacial moraine. The coarse sand, gravel, and boulders were left behind by glaciers.

The artifacts provide answers to an economic question: why did the Beothuk avoid Europeans? The interiors of four houses and their environs produced some 1,157 nails, the majority of which were forged by the Beothuk. The site's occupants manufactured some sixty-seven projectile points (most made from nails and bones). They modified nails to use as what are believed to be scrapers to remove fat from animal hides, they straightened fish hooks and adapted them as awls, they fashioned lead into ornaments, and so on. In summary, the Boyd's Cove Beothuk took debris from an early modern European fishery and fashioned materials.

=== Trends in findings across Beothuk archaeological sites ===
All Beothuk sites of note are in coastal areas; this implies that, prior to European settlement, most Indigenous settlements were along the coast. This adds evidence to the claim that the Beothuk were cut off from their food sources which led to many of them starving to death as they were pushed inland. Many sites consist of the same elements because they are all former occupational sites. These sites show a variety of material culture based on what period they are from; however, most contain the remains of animals, remainders of permanent and semipermanent structures such as remains of fire pits and sleeping hollows. Several sites, such as Sampson's Head Cove, had wooden and bone tools as well as stone arrowheads. There have also been instances of stone jewelry found at residential sites. Several people have claimed to have uncovered Beothuk burials; however, these are not substantiated by much evidence of this. Additionally, many cases of Beothuk remains may have been true at one point but because of mishandling the remains are now lost and unable to be verified. A prime example of this is a picture of what was said to be a mummified Beothuk child, which was lost by the Newfoundland Museum that it was held in due to the fact that the museum shared a building with a post office. In the early 1900s the child's remains, as well as the remains of an adult Beothuk and a number of other Beothuk artifacts, were put in storage by the post office and then subsequently lost. Additionally all images of this were subsequently lost once again due to neglect leaving nothing but first hand accounts to even confirm the existence of the remains and artifacts, leaving them entirely to the public imagination. Other accounts confirm that this is fairly normal for Beothuk remains.

== Genetics ==
In 2007, DNA testing was conducted on material from the teeth of Demasduit and her husband Nonosabasut, two Beothuk individuals buried in the 1820s. The results assigned them to Haplogroup X (mtDNA) and Haplogroup C (mtDNA), respectively, which are also found in current Mi'kmaq populations in Newfoundland. DNA research indicates they were solely of First Nation Indigenous maternal ancestry, unlike some earlier studies suggesting an Indigenous/European hybrid. However, a 2011 analysis showed although the two Beothuk and living Mi'kmaq occur in the same haplogroups, SNP differences between Beothuk and Mi'kmaq individuals indicate they were dissimilar within those groups, and a 'close-relationship' theory was not supported.
