= Exploits River =

Coordinates: 49°04′52″N 55°19′39″W

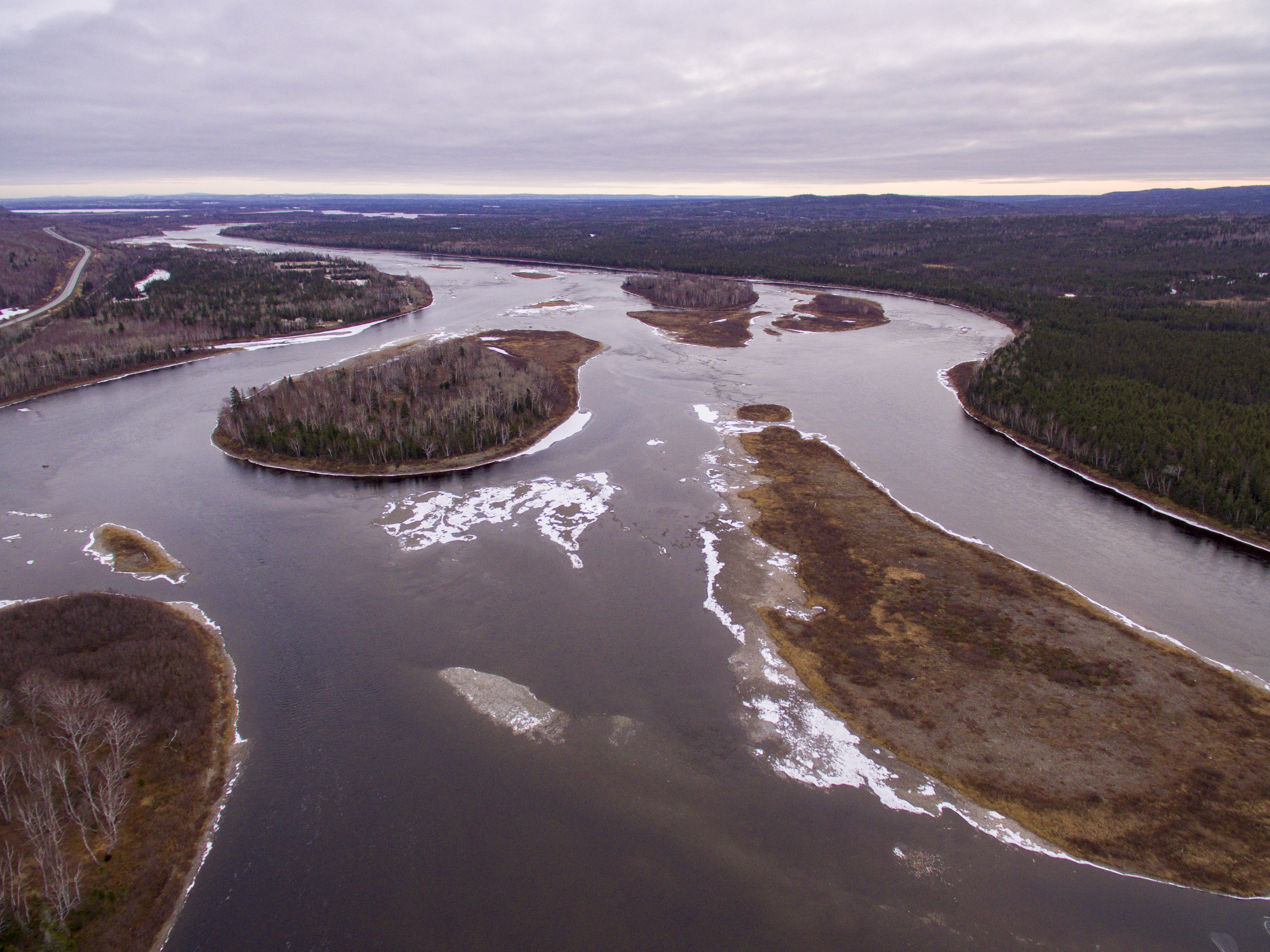

Location
- Country: Canada
- Province: Newfoundland and Labrador

Physical characteristics
- Source
  - location: Beothuk Lake, Newfoundland and Labrador
- Mouth
  - location: Bay of Exploits, Newfoundland and Labrador
  - elevation: 0 m (0 ft)
- Length: 246 km (153 mi)
- Basin size: 11,000 km^{2} (4,200 sq mi)

Mouth of the Exploits River

The Exploits River (Mi'kmaq: Sple'tk; Tenenigeg) is a river in the province of Newfoundland and Labrador, Canada. It flows through the Exploits Valley in the central part of Newfoundland.

Including the Lloyds River, which discharges in Beothuk Lake, the Exploits river has a length of 246 km, making it the longest river on the island draining an area of 1,100 km^{2} and is the second longest in the province after the Churchill River.

The river drains Beothuk Lake at its source and discharges into the Bay of Exploits near the port town of Botwood.

The Exploits River provides habitat for spawning Atlantic Salmon and other species of fish. The salmon population increased dramatically when fish ladders were installed, opening up sections of the river that had been previously inaccessible.

== Tributaries ==
- Lloyds River
- Victoria River
- Buchans River

== See also ==
- List of rivers of Newfoundland and Labrador
- Bay of Exploits
