= Qalipu First Nation =

First Nations band government in Newfoundland and Labrador, Canada

- Band No. 34
- People: Miꞌkmaq
- Headquarters: Corner Brook
- Province: Newfoundland and Labrador

Land
- Other reserve: None

Population (2019)
- Off reserve: 26,187
- Total population: 26,187

Government
- Chief: Jenny Brake
- Council: Chief Jenny Brake; Central Vice-Chief Colleen Paul; western Vice-Chief Charlie White; Lory Benoit-Jesso (Port au Port); Ernest Green (Corner Brook); Shianne Squires (Exploits); Calvin Francis (Gander Bay); Terri Greene (Benoit's Cove); Francis Skeard (Glenwood); Ivan White Sr. (Flat Bay); Vacant (St. George's); Miranda Osmond (Stephenville)

Website
- qalipu.ca

The Qalipu First Nation (phon: /xa.li.bu/, [xalibu]; Mi'kmaq for 'caribou') is a Mi'kmaq band government based on the eastern Canadian island of Newfoundland. The landless band was created by order-in-council in 2011, pursuant to the Agreement for the Recognition of the Qalipu Mi'kmaq Band. Following their approval as a First Nation, around 100,000 people applied for membership, while a total of 23,000 were, ultimately, approved. This is more than the entire Mi'kmaq population of all thirteen bands within Nova Scotia combined; approximately 19,000 band members live both on and off reserve.

In 2018, the Qalipu First Nation was accepted as a member of the Canadian Assembly of First Nations.

== History prior to recognition ==
=== Pre-contact ===
Prior to the time of European contact, the Mi'kmaq people inhabited Miꞌkmaꞌki, their vast territories which encompassed much of modern-day Nova Scotia and Prince Edward Island, as well as portions of northeastern New Brunswick and Quebec's Gaspé Peninsula.

By the 17th century, the Mi'kmaq would often visit the island they called Ktaqamkuk (present-day Newfoundland) by crossing the Cabot Strait in shallops that they adopted from European fur traders. They visited the island and hunted along its south coast, going as far east as Placentia Bay, before returning to Unamaki. Gradually, Ktaqamkuk became one of their "domain of islands". Some Mi'kmaq individuals have stated that, in addition to those traveling to the island to hunt, a group of their people had already lived on the island for hundreds of years. The island's historical populace, the Beothuk, are thought to have died out in the early 1800s. Shanawdithit was the last full-blooded, known living member of the Beothuk people; she eventually died with no known living descendants.

=== Permanent settlement in Newfoundland ===
During Canada's 18th-century colonial period, French and British forces warred for rights to North American land claims. The Mi'kmaq, and several other First Nations, became closely allied with France, with whom they frequently traded furs and other goods and necessities. Together, they raided British colonial settlements in New England, as well as the Atlantic regions of what would become Canada. In 1763, after France was defeated by Britain in the Seven Years' War, the country ceded all land east of the Mississippi River to Great Britain, including the Mi'kmaq long-held traditional land. After this, numerous British colonists entered the territories and tried to settle.

Newfoundland, however, was still sparsely populated, and most Europeans lived on the eastern portion of the island, in small and isolated coastal fishing settlements. The Mi'kmaq living on the island were, essentially, able to continue their traditional way of life on the island's west coast and within the interior. After the Beothuk people disappeared in the 1800s, the Mi'kmaq no longer shared Newfoundland's interior with another people. In 1857, a colonial census of Newfoundland recorded Mi'kmaq settlements at St. George's Bay, Codroy Valley, Bay d'Espoir and the Bay of Exploits.

The English and other Europeans had little knowledge of the interior and relied on the Mi'kmaq for support. In 1822, explorer William Cormack traversed the island's interior from Trinity Bay to St. George's Bay, guided by a Mi'kmaw man named Sylvester Joe. In the 1860s, the British hired a group of Mi'kmaq men for overland postal delivery via a network of trails to reach the northern communities.

==== Decline ====
In 1898, a railway was constructed across the island, giving Europeans greater access to Newfoundland's interior. Numerous settlers thus arrived to hunt the caribou and moose, in addition to other animals, causing a sharp decline in local wildlife populations. The caribou, for example, had served as one of the main sources of food and supplies for the Mi'kmaq, and their decline adversely affected the survival of the people. Starting in the 1920s, global fur prices began to decline as the demand for fur dropped, resulting in some Mi'kmaq quitting trapping to work for Europeans as loggers.

== Drive for recognition ==
In 1972, activists formed the Native Association of Newfoundland and Labrador as the main organization representing the Mi'kmaq, Innu and Inuit peoples of Newfoundland and Labrador. After the Labrador Innu and Inuit left the Association in 1975, the organization was renamed as the Federation of Newfoundland Indians (FNI). The FNI included six Mi'kmaq bands: the Benoits Cove Band, the Corner Brook Indian Band, the Flat Bay Indian Band, the Gander Bay Indian Band, the Glenwood Mi'kmaq First Nation and the Port au Port Indian Band. The provincial government supported the FNI. The federal government approved only the petition for recognition made by the Mi'kmaq at Conne River. In 1987, the Miawpukek Mi'kmaq First Nation was recognized under the Indian Act, and their community of Conne River was classified as reserved land for the Mi'kmaq.

Recognition for the remainder of Newfoundland's Mi'kmaq was a much longer process; the group's attempts to obtain status under the Indian Act were fruitless, and led to a Federal Court action in 1989, in which the FNI sought a declaration that its members were Indians within the meaning of the 1867 Constitution Act. Minister David Crombie was willing to work with the FNI and the government of Newfoundland, but the provincial government considered it to be a federal matter.

In 2003, Minister Andy Scott was presented with a report that recommended a First Nations band without any reserved land to represent the Mi'kmaq of Newfoundland. An Agreement-in-principle was reached in 2006, which the FNI accepted in 2007. The federal government ratified it in 2008.

=== Membership ===
The Government of Canada had expected band membership to be similar to the membership of the Federation of Newfoundland Indians, around 5,000 people. Instead, around 105,000 people, or the equivalent of one-fifth of the population of Newfoundland, applied to become band members.

After the first round of enrollment, 23,000 of 30,000 applicants were accepted. Although not yet functional, the band became the second largest by membership in Canada. This put the enrolment process to a halt and a supplemental agreement between the Federation of Newfoundland Indians and Canada was formed in 2013. The rest of the outstanding applications were put in indefinite storage. In 2013 applicants organized a new group, the Mi’kmaq First Nations Assembly of Newfoundland to lobby to continue the enrollment process. They began to prepare for a legal action regarding the enrollment process should lobbying fail. In 2014, parliament passed Bill C-25, authorizing it to review all applications and retroactively reject some, based on criteria similar to those used in the R v Powley case that defined rights for the Métis people. The 2013 agreement tightened rules and criteria thus leaving 80,000+ applicants rejected in its wake. In 2017, only 18,044 were eligible for membership. In 2018, the Qalipu First Nation announced that the updated Founding Members List for the Band was adopted by way of an Order in Council which came into effect on June 25, 2018. The 2018 Band list included 18,575 members. By 2021, nearly 24,000 people were recognized as founding members, in 67 Newfoundland communities and abroad.

=== Questions of legitimacy ===
In 2013, Chiefs Terrance Paul and Gerard Julian, co-chairs of the Assembly of Nova Scotia Chiefs, sent a joint letter to the Minister of Aboriginal Affairs and Northern Development Canada. They presented their concerns regarding the legitimacy of the Qalipu band, and asked for further clarification and explanation by the federal government. They disputed the authority of the federal government to determine who qualifies as Mi’kmaq. They said that, while the government of Canada may have jurisdiction over who is an Indian, they do not have the constitutional right to determine who is a Mi’kmaq.

Later in 2013, the Mi’kmaq Grand Council, the traditional government of the Mi'kmaq people, issued a statement to the United Nations denouncing the Qalipu band as illegitimate. The letter stated, "These new Qalipu members we simply do not know and do not recognize as Mi’kmaq." The Mi'kmaq Rights Initiative assert that the Qalipu were created as an entity by the federal government, and they do not consider them as part of the broader Mi'kmaq nation. The Friends of Qalipu Advocacy Association is currently taking Qalipu First Nation (and its precursor) to court over the enrolment process.

== Governance ==
A band council is elected under the Qalipu Mi’kmaq First Nation Band Custom Election Rules, which were a part of the agreement with the Canadian government. Changes to the Custom Election Rules can be made only after a referendum voted on by the whole band membership. In 2021, a referendum passed changing terms of office to four years starting in 2024.

=== Council ===
Members of the Qalipu Mi'kmaq First Nation elect a Chief (currently Jenny Brake), two Vice Chiefs, and councillors representing a total of nine wards.

==== Wards and councillors ====
Shown below are the electoral districts and the results from the 2021 election.

Benoits Cove Elmastukwek (Mi'kmaq)	Corner Brook	Exploits Sple'tk (Mi'kmaq)
Deer Lake (Qalipue'katik); Humber Arm South; Lark Harbour; Sop's Arm; York Harbour; Councillor: Terri Greene; Election: Terri V. GREENE 635; Glenn SAVARD 342	Corner Brook; Cox's Cove; George's Lake (Ketuastukwek); Gillams; Hughes Brook; Irishtown-Summerside; Massey Drive; McIvers; Meadows; Mount Moriah; Pasadena; Pinchgut Lake; Spruce Brook; Steady Brook; Councillor: Sharren (Sherry) Dean; Election: Sharren (Sherry) Dean (acclaimed)	Badger; Bishop's Falls (Kjipa'tiilia'sewey Qapskuk); Botwood; Buchans; Buchans Junction; Grand Falls-Windsor (Qapskuk); Leading Tickles; Millertown; Norris Arm (Kepapskek); Northern Arm; Peterview; Point Leamington; St. Alban's (Sipko'p); Councillor: Charlene Combdon; Election (by-election): Charlene COMBDON 146; Toby PENNEY 124; David HOWSE 46
Flat Bay	Gander Bay	Glenwood
Burgeo (Najioqonuk); Flat Bay; St. Fintan's; St. Teresa; Councillor: Bobby White; Election: Robert (Bobby) WHITE 335; Sammual Gary WARREN 120	Clarke's Head; Gander Bay South; Rodgers Cove; Victoria Cove; Wing's Point (Etli-unaqatejita'jik); Councillor: Calvin Francis; Election: Calvin Francis (acclaimed)	Appleton; Birchy Bay; Brown's Arm; Campbellton; Comfort Cove; Gander (Akilasiye'wa'kik); Glenwood; Lewisporte; Swift Current; Councillor: Francis Skeard; Election: Francis Skeard (acclaimed)
Port au Port Kitpu (Mi'kmaq)	Stephenville	St. George's Nujio'qon (Mi'kmaq)
Abraham's Cove; Black Duck Brook; Boswarlos; Campbells Creek; Cape St. George; De Grau; Fox Island River-Point au Mal; Kippens; Lourdes; Ship Cove-Lower Cove-Jerry's Nose; Mainland; Marches Point; Piccadilly; Port au Port East; Port au Port West-Aguathuna-Felix Cove; Red Brook; Sheaves Cove; Three Rock Cove; West Bay; Councillor: Jasen Benwah; Election: Jasen BENWAH 892; Jeffrey YOUNG 613	Black Duck Siding; Gallants; Stephenville; Stephenville Crossing; Councillor: Hayward Young; Election: Hayward George YOUNG 891; Darcy James BUTLER 478	Barachois Brook (Kutapsku'j); Mattis Point; St. George's (Nujio'qon); Councillor: Ivan J White Jr; Election: Ivan J. WHITE 415; Trevor MUISE 171
