= Port au Port (electoral district) =

Former provincial electoral district in Newfoundland and Labrador, Canada

Newfoundland and Labrador electoral district
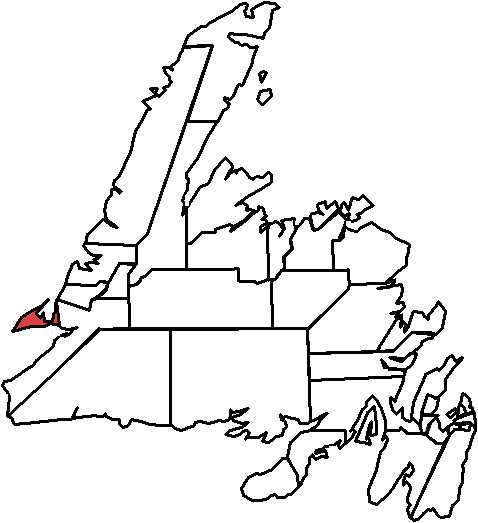
- Port au Port in relation to other districts in Newfoundland

Provincial electoral district
- Legislature: Newfoundland and Labrador House of Assembly
- District created: 1972
- First contested: 1972
- Last contested: 2011

Demographics
- Population (2006): 11,076
- Electors (2011): 8,439

Port au Port is a defunct provincial electoral district for the House of Assembly of Newfoundland and Labrador, Canada. In 2011, there were 8,439 eligible voters living within the district. The district covered the Port au Port Peninsula, and was among the poorest in the province. The district also had a substantial francophone population.

The district was abolished in 2015 and replaced by Stephenville-Port au Port.

== Communities ==
It contains the western part of the town of Stephenville, as well as the communities of Abraham's Cove, Aguathuna, Berry Head, Black Duck Brook, Boswarlos, Campbell's Creek, Cape St. George, De Grau, Felix Cove, Fox Island River, Jerry's Nose, Kippens, Lourdes, Lower Cove, Mainland, Marches Point, Piccadilly, Point au Mal, Port au Port, Red Brook, Sheaves Cove, Ship Cove, Three Rock Cove, West Bay, West Bay Centre, and Winterhouse.

== Members of the House of Assembly ==
The district has elected the following members of the House of Assembly:

Member	Party	Term
Tony Cornect	Progressive Conservative	2007–2015
Jim Hodder	Progressive Conservative	2003–2007
Gerald Smith	Liberal	1993–2003
Jim Hodder	Progressive Conservative	1985–1993
Jim Hodder	Liberal	1975–1985
Frederick Stagg	Progressive Conservative	1971–1975
William R. Callahan	Liberal	1966–1971
Stephen K. Smith	Liberal	1956–1966

== Election results ==
2011 Newfoundland and Labrador general election
Party	Candidate	Votes	%	±%
Progressive Conservative	Tony Cornect	2,609	58.99%	–
Liberal	Kate Mitchell Mansfield	954	21.57%	
NDP	Jamie Brace	860	19.44%	

2007 Newfoundland and Labrador general election
Party	Candidate	Votes	%	±%
Progressive Conservative	Tony Cornect	3,936	81.22%	–
Liberal	Michelle Felix	910	18.78%	

By-election, February 8, 2007 resignation of Jim Hodder
Party	Candidate	Votes	%	+/-
Progressive Conservative	Tony Cornect	2,701	62.0	
Liberal	Mark Felix	1,521	34.9	
New Democrat	Paul O'Keefe	135	3.1	

2003 Newfoundland and Labrador general election
Party	Candidate	Votes	%	±%
Progressive Conservative	Jim Hodder	3,101	55.74	–
Liberal	Gerald Smith	2,378	42.75	
Independent	Frederick G. Ollerhead	84	1.51	

== See also ==
- List of Newfoundland and Labrador provincial electoral districts
- Canadian provincial electoral districts
