= Newfoundland and Labrador Route 460 =

Highway in Newfoundland and Labrador, Canada

Coordinates: 48.5531°N 58.6599°W

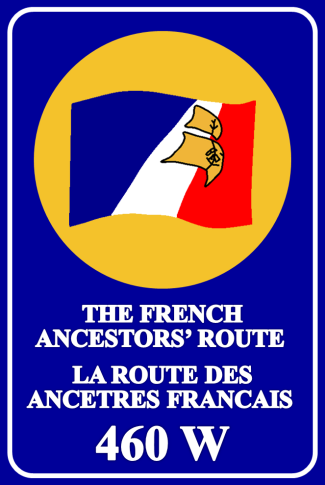
Route 460
- White's Road; Hansen Memorial Highway; Kippens Road; Port au Port Highway; The French Ancestors Route

Route information
- Maintained by Newfoundland and Labrador Department of Transportation and Infrastructure
- Length: 87.5 km (54.4 mi)

Major junctions
- East end: Route 1 (TCH) (Exit 3) in Harry's Brook
- Route 461 near Stephenville Crossing; Route 490 at Stephenville; Route 462 at Port au Port; Route 463 at Abraham's Cove; Route 463 in Cape St. George
- West end: Boutte du Cap Park main entrance in Cape St. George

Location
- Country: Canada
- Province: Newfoundland and Labrador

Highway system
- Highways in Newfoundland and Labrador
← Route 450A	→ Route 461

Route 460 is an 87.5-kilometre-long (54.4 mi) east-west Canadian provincial highway in Newfoundland and Labrador.

It is located on the west coast of the island of Newfoundland and has its western terminus at Cape St. George, the westernmost tip of the Port au Port Peninsula, and its eastern terminus at an interchange in Harry's Brook with Route 1, the Trans-Canada Highway, at Exit 3.

The highway has developed in several distinct sections:

- Harrys Brook to interchange with Route 461 at Long Gull Pond (17 km) was developed at the time that the Trans-Canada Highway was built across Newfoundland in the early 1960s, this section is known as White's Road.
- Long Gull Pond to interchange with Route 490 at Stephenville (16 km), the Hansen Memorial Highway, was developed by the US Army Corps of Engineers to run from Ernest Harmon AFB to the Newfoundland Railway main line at Long Gull Pond. Later, the USACE constructed its own narrow gauge railway line to connect the base with the main line, parallel to the Hansen Memorial Highway.
- Interchange with Route 490 at Stephenville to western boundary of Kippens (4.5 km), known as Kippens Road.
- Continuation from western boundary of Kippens through Port au Port and along the south coast of the Port au Port Peninsula to Cape St. George (51 km), the Port au Port Highway.

== Communities along Route 460 ==
- Black Duck Siding
- Stephenville Crossing
- Noel's Pond
- Stephenville
- Kippens
- Romaines
- Port au Port
- Port au Port West
- Felix Cove
- Man of War Cove
- Campbell's Creek
- Abraham's Cove
- Ship Cove-Lower Cove-Jerry's Nose
- Sheaves Cove
- Marches Point
- Loretto
- Red Brook
- De Grau
- Grand Jardin
- Petit Jardin
- Cape St. George

== Communities off of Route 460 ==
- Aguathuna
- Boswarlos

== Construction history for Hansen Memorial Highway section ==
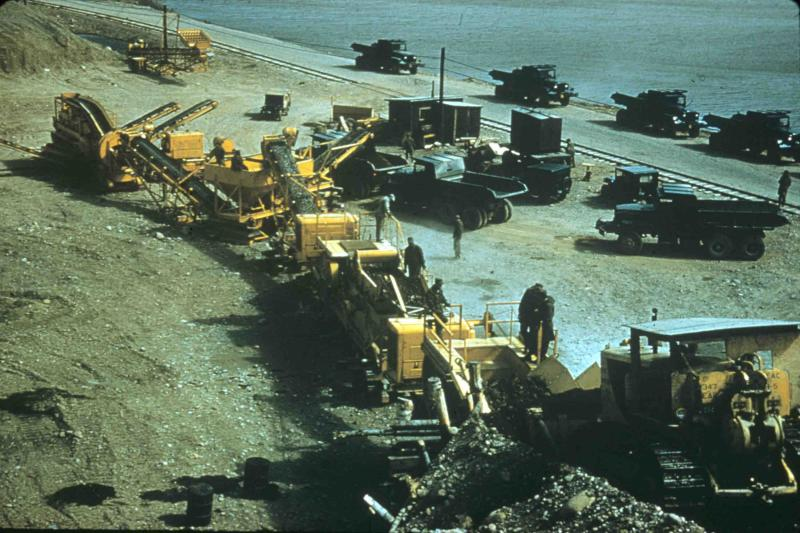
Grading equipment at work on the Hansen Memorial Highway

The US Army Corps of Engineers began work on the Stephenville bypass road in the 1950s. Company C, under the command of Capt. Claxton Ray, began at Stephenville and worked towards Company B, under the command of Capt. Gomez, which had commenced construction near Cormiers Village and were working in both directions, towards Long Gull Pond and towards Stephenville. It was necessary for Company B to begin construction of the road at Cormiers Village and work back towards Stephenville pending the finalizing of property agreements.

The eleven-mile-long (18 km) highway construction project began with a line of corduroy roads comprising one half of the road, and when Long Gull Pond was reached in the fall of 1954, the other half was constructed. The road was then extended along the Newfoundland Railway main line from Long Gull Pond to Stephenville Crossing (this section is now the eastern terminus of Route 461.

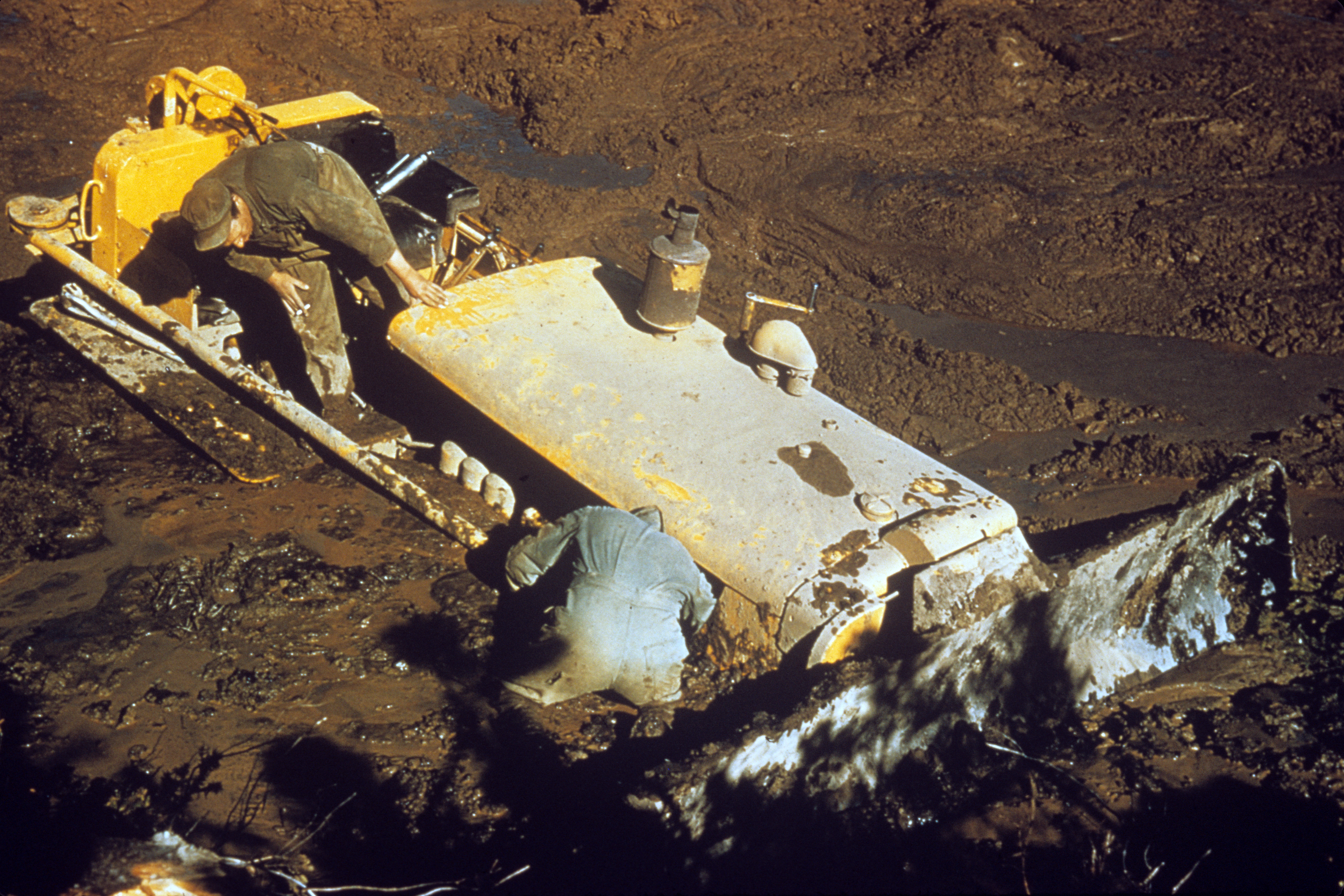
Bogged down in muck during construction

It was necessary to build three access roads approximately two miles in length in order to facilitate construction of the bypass road. These roads were built to the same specifications as the bypass road as they were used constantly for heavy hauling. A concrete bridge was built over Cold Creek in 1954 and a 60-foot (20 m) concrete bridge was built over Warm Creek in 1956.

The project required 90,000 cubic yards (70,000 m³) of fill as well as 30,000 cubic yards (20,000 m³) of crushed rock to complete the sub-base. The travel surface required 15,000 cubic yards (10,000 m³) of gravel, 19 inches thick before asphalt was applied. Construction equipment and material were stored at a depot Long Gull Pond during the project.

The bypass road was officially opened for military and public users in October 1957.

== Major intersections ==
Location	km	mi	Destinations	Notes
Cape St. George	0.0	0.0	Boutte du Cap Park main entrance	End of Asphalt at main gate; western terminus
Cape St. George	0.5	0.31	Route 463 east (Lourdes Road) – Mainland	Western terminus of Route 463
Abraham's Cove	28.3	17.6	Route 463 west (Lourdes Road) – Lourdes	Eastern terminus of Route 463
Felix Cove	41.5	25.8	Father Joy's Road (Route 460-14) - Aguathuna, Boswarlos	
Port au Port West	44.7	27.8	Main Street (Route 460-13) - Aguathuna, Boswarlos	
Port au Port	46.2	28.7	Route 462 north (Point au Mal Road) – Point au Mal, Fox Island River	Southern terminus of Route 462
Stephenville	55.0	34.2	West Street - Downtown	
Stephenville	55.8	34.7	Gallant Street	
Stephenville	56.7	35.2	Queen Street	
Stephenville	60.5	37.6	Igloo Road	
Noel's Pond	62.1	38.6	Route 490 south (Minnesota Drive/Katarina Roxon Way) to Route 1 (TCH) – Stephenville, Stephenville Crossing	Northern terminus of Route 490; provides access to Stephenville International Airport
Stephenville Crossing	70.9	44.1	Route 461 south (Brook Street) – Stephenville Crossing, St. George's	Northern terminus of Route 461
Harry's Brook	87.5	54.4	Route 1 (TCH) – Corner Brook, Port aux Basques	Exit 3 on Route 1; eastern terminus
1.000 mi = 1.609 km; 1.000 km = 0.621 mi
