= Newfoundland and Labrador Route 490 =

Highway in Newfoundland and Labrador

Route 490
- Stephenville Access Road; Katarina Roxon Way

Route information
- Maintained by Newfoundland and Labrador Department of Transportation and Infrastructure
- Length: 18.7 km (11.6 mi)

Major junctions
- South end: Route 1 (TCH) (Exit 2) in Barachois Brook
- Route 461 between Barachois Brook and Stephenville Crossing
- North end: Route 460 in Stephenville

Location
- Country: Canada
- Province: Newfoundland and Labrador

Highway system
- Highways in Newfoundland and Labrador
← Route 480	→ Route 500

Route 490, also known as Stephenville Access Road and Katarina Roxon Way, is a 18.7-kilometre-long (11.6 mi) north–south highway on the western coast of Newfoundland in the Canadian province of Newfoundland and Labrador. It is one of two highways that connects the town of Stephenville with the Trans-Canada Highway (Route 1), with the other being Route 460 (Hansen Memorial Highway).

== Route description ==
Route 490 begins at an interchange with Route 1 (Exit 2) in the community of Barachois Brook and heads north through rural areas to have an intersection and become concurrent with Route 461. This is the only example of a road concurrency in the entire province of Newfoundland and Labrador. They head north along the coastline to have an intersection with a local road leading to Mattis Point before crossing a bridge over an inlet to enter the town of Stephenville Crossing. Route 490 and Route 461 almost immediately split at a fork in the road, with Route 490 bypassing downtown on its western side along the coast. Route 490 now leaves town and winds its way northwest through rural hilly terrain for several kilometres to enter the Stephenville town limits and pass by the site of the former Ernest Harmon Air Force Base. The highway now passes through wooded areas for a few kilometres before making a sharp right turn at an intersection with Minnesota Drive. Route 490 comes to an end shortly thereafter at an intersection with Route 460 just northeast of downtown.

== Major intersections ==
Location	km	mi	Destinations	Notes
Barachois Brook	0.0	0.0	Route 1 (TCH) – Port aux Basques, Corner Brook	Exit 2 on Route 1; southern terminus
Barachois Brook	3.5	2.2	Route 461 south (Main Road) – Barachois Brook, St. George's	Southern end of Route 461 concurrency
	5.2	3.2	Mattis Point Road (Route 461-11) - Mattis Point	
Stephenville Crossing	5.9	3.7	Route 461 north (West Street) – Stephenville Crossing	Northern end of Route 461 concurrency
Stephenville	16.4	10.2	Carolina Avenue - Stephenville International Airport, Industrial Park	
Stephenville	18.4	11.4	Minnesota Drive - Downtown	Sharp right turn at intersection required
Stephenville	18.7	11.6	Route 460 (Hansen Memorial Highway/Kippens Road) to Route 1 (TCH) – Port au Port Peninsula, Kippens, Noel's Pond, Black Duck Siding	Northern terminus; French Ancestors Route
1.000 mi = 1.609 km; 1.000 km = 0.621 mi: Concurrency terminus
