= Ethel Cochrane =

Canadian politician (1937–2026)

The Honourable Ethel M. Cochrane

Senator for Newfoundland and Labrador
- In office November 17, 1986 – September 23, 2012
- Appointed by: Brian Mulroney
- Preceded by: Eric Cook
- Succeeded by: David Wells

Personal details
- Born: September 23, 1937 Port au Port Peninsula, Dominion of Newfoundland
- Died: June 30, 2026 (aged 88) Port au Port East, Newfoundland and Labrador, Canada
- Party: Conservative (2004–2026)
- Other political affiliations: Progressive Conservative
- Spouse: Jim Cochrane
- Occupation: Canadian Senator
- Profession: Educator, school administrator

Ethel M. Cochrane (September 23, 1937 – June 30, 2026) was a Canadian politician who served as a Senator, representing the province of Newfoundland and Labrador from 1986 until 2012.

== Life and career ==
A teacher by training, Cochrane worked as an educator in her native Newfoundland culminating in her period as a school principal. An advocate for education and literacy, she was appointed to the Senate by Governor General Jeanne Sauvé, on the recommendation of Prime Minister Brian Mulroney, in November 1986. She sat as a Progressive Conservative senator until February 2004 when she and most other PC Senators joined the new Conservative Party of Canada. Cochrane is the first female senator to represent Newfoundland and Labrador. She retired in 2012 when she reached the mandatory retirement age of 75. She was a past member of the Girl Guides of Canada.

Cochrane resided in Port au Port East with her husband Jim. She died on June 30, 2026, at the age of 88.
