= Frederick Stagg =

Canadian politician

Frederick Ross "Fred" Stagg (born 1942) is a lawyer and former politician in Newfoundland. He represented Port au Port from 1971 to 1975 and Stephenville from 1979 to 1985 in the Newfoundland House of Assembly.

The son of Chesley Stagg and Gwendolyn Billard, he was born in Clarenville, but moved as a one-year-old to the town of Boswarlos on the Port au Port Peninsula and was educated at Memorial University and the University of New Brunswick. He was first employed as a teacher and then went on to study law, was called to the Newfoundland bar in 1970 and set up practice in Stephenville. Stagg married Cheryl Joan Rees. He served as president of the Stephenville Jets hockey team for several years.

Stagg was first elected to the Newfoundland assembly in 1971 and was reelected in 1972. He retired from politics in 1975 and then was elected for Stephenville in 1979. He was defeated by Kevin Aylward when he ran for reelection in 1985.
