= Newfoundland and Labrador Route 463 =

Highway in Newfoundland and Labrador, Canada

Route 463
- Lourdes Road; French Ancestors Route
- Route 463 passing through the community of Lourdes on Port au Port Peninsula, Newfoundland

Route information
- Maintained by Newfoundland and Labrador Department of Transportation and Infrastructure
- Length: 51.7 km (32.1 mi)

Major junctions
- West end: Route 460 in Cape St. George
- East end: Route 460 in Abraham's Cove

Location
- Country: Canada
- Province: Newfoundland and Labrador

Highway system
- Highways in Newfoundland and Labrador
← Route 462	→ Route 470

Route 463, also known as Lourdes Road, is a rural highway in Newfoundland and Labrador that leads from Route 460 at Abraham's Cove to Cape St. George. It is situated entirely on the northern shore of the Port au Port Peninsula in Western Newfoundland and has an approximate length of 51.7 kilometres (32.1 mi). Along with Route 460, Route 463 also carries the designation of the French Ancestors Route.

== Route description ==
Route 463 begins in Cape St. George at an intersection with Route 460 (Port au Port Highway) near the entrance to Boutte du Cap Park. It heads northward through rural areas for several kilometres to join the western coastline of the peninsula at Mainland. The highway heads northeast to passing through that town, along with Three Rock Cove, before passing through Lourdes, where it turns southeast along the northern coastline of the peninsula at an intersection with a local road leading to Black Duck Brook and Winterhouse. Route 463 now passes through Tea Cove, West Bay, West Bay Centre, Piccadilly Head (where it passes by Piccadilly Head Regional Park), Piccadilly Slant, and Piccadilly before finally arriving at Abraham's Cove, where Route 463 comes to an end at another intersection with Route 460.

== Major intersections ==
Location	km	mi	Destinations	Notes
Cape St. George	0.0	0.0	Route 460 (Port au Port Highway/French Ancestors Route) to Route 1 (TCH) – Stephenville, Boutte du Cap Park	Western terminus
Lourdes	32.9	20.4	Clam Bank Cove Road (Route 463-11) - Black Duck Brook and Winterhouse	
Piccadilly Head	44.3	27.5	Piccadilly Head Regional Park main entrance	Access road into park
Abraham's Cove	51.7	32.1	Route 460 (Port au Port Highway/French Ancestors Route) to Route 1 (TCH) – Stephenville, Cape St. George	Eastern terminus
1.000 mi = 1.609 km; 1.000 km = 0.621 mi

== See also ==
- List of Newfoundland and Labrador highways
