= Port au Port =

Port au Port may refer to:

- Port au Port Peninsula, a peninsula on the island of Newfoundland
- Port au Port, Newfoundland and Labrador, a community on the peninsula
