= St. George's Bay (Newfoundland and Labrador) =

Bay in Newfoundland and Labrador, Canada

Coordinates: 48.41°N 58.90°W

Location of St. George's Bay in the province of Newfoundland and Labrador

St. George's Bay - informally referred to as Bay St. George due to its French translation Baie St-George - is a large bay in the province of Newfoundland and Labrador, Canada. It is located on the west coast of the island of Newfoundland and comprises a sub-basin of the Gulf of St. Lawrence. The estimated population of the entire bay is 16,000, based on the demographic data of each community.

The bay measures approximately 64 kilometres (40 mi) wide at its mouth, between Cape Anguille in the south, and Cape St. George in the north. Its northern shore measures approximately 60 km (37 mi) in length from the head of the bay at Stephenville Crossing to Cape St. George, located at the western tip of the Port au Port Peninsula. The southern shore measures approximately 100 km (62 mi) from Stephenville Crossing to Cape Anguille.

Communities along the shoreline of St. George's Bay include (from northwest to east to southwest):

- Cape St. George
- Petit Jardin
- Grand Jardin
- De Grau
- Red Brook
- Loretto
- Marches Point
- Sheaves Cove
- Lower Cove
- Ship Cove
- Jerrys Nose
- Abraham's Cove
- Campbells Creek
- Man of War Cove
- Felix Cove
- Aguathuna
- Bellmans Cove
- Port au Port
- Port au Port East
- Romaines
- Kippens
- Stephenville
- Stephenville Crossing
- Mattis Point
- Barachois Brook
- Seal Rocks
- St. George's
- Sandy Point
- Shallop Cove
- Flat Bay
- Flat Bay West
- St. Teresa
- Journois
- Fischells
- Heatherton
- Robinsons
- McKay's
- Jeffrey's
- Bay St. George South
- St. David's
- Maidstone
- St. Fintan's
- Loch Leven
- Highlands
- Cape Anguille

== See also ==
- Isthmus Bay, a sub-bay along the northern edge
- List of communities in Newfoundland and Labrador
