= Newfoundland and Labrador Route 461 =

Highway in Newfoundland and Labrador, Canada

Route 461

Route information
- Maintained by Newfoundland and Labrador Department of Transportation and Infrastructure
- Length: 21.0 km (13.0 mi)

Major junctions
- South end: Route 1 (TCH) near St. George's
- Route 490 between Barachois Brook and Stephenville Crossing
- North end: Route 460 in Stephenville Crossing

Location
- Country: Canada
- Province: Newfoundland and Labrador

Highway system
- Highways in Newfoundland and Labrador
← Route 460	→ Route 462

Route 461 is a 21.0-kilometre-long (13.0 mi) north–south highway on the western side of Newfoundland in the Canadian province of Newfoundland and Labrador. It connects the towns of St. George's, Barachois Brook, Mattis Point, and Stephenville Crossing.

== Route description ==
Route 461 begins at an intersection with Route 1 (Trans-Canada Highway) and it heads north to enter St. George's, where it makes a sharp right turn onto Main Street in downtown. The highway winds its way northeast through neighbourhoods as it follows the coast before crossing a river into Barachois Brook. Route 461 passes through that town before coming to an intersection with Route 490 (Stephenville Access Road/Katarina Roxon Way), where it becomes concurrent with Route 490 and they head north to have an intersection with a local road leading to Mattis Point. This is the only example of a road concurrency in the entire province of Newfoundland and Labrador. Route 461/Route 490 now cross a bridge over an inlet to enter Stephenville Crossing, where the two highways split at a fork in the road, with Route 461 going straight through downtown along West Street and Brook Street. Route 461 now heads northward through neighbourhoods for a few kilometres to leave town and come to an end shortly thereafter at an intersection with Route 460 (White's Road/Hansen Memorial Highway).

== Major intersections ==
Location	km	mi	Destinations	Notes
St. George's	0.0	0.0	Route 1 (TCH) – Corner Brook, Port aux Basques	Southern terminus
St. George's	4.4	2.7	Main Street (Route 461-12) - Shallop Cove	
Barachois Brook	11.6	7.2	Route 490 south (Stephenville Access Road/Katarina Roxon Way) to Route 1 (TCH)	Southern end of Route 490 concurrency
	13.2	8.2	Mattis Point Road (Route 461-11) - Mattis Point	
Stephenville Crossing	13.9	8.6	Route 490 north (Stephenville Access Road/Katarina Roxon Way) – Stephenville	Northern end of Route 490 concurrency
Stephenville Crossing	21.0	13.0	Route 460 (White's Road/Hansen Memorial Highway) to Route 1 (TCH) – Stephenville, Port au Port Peninsula	Northern terminus; French Ancestors Route
1.000 mi = 1.609 km; 1.000 km = 0.621 mi: Concurrency terminus
