= Newfoundland and Labrador Route 462 =

Highway in Newfoundland and Labrador, Canada

Route 462
- Point au Mal Road

Route information
- Maintained by Newfoundland and Labrador Department of Transportation and Infrastructure
- Length: 18.5 km (11.5 mi)

Major junctions
- South end: Route 460 in Port au Port
- North end: Fox Island River

Location
- Country: Canada
- Province: Newfoundland and Labrador

Highway system
- Highways in Newfoundland and Labrador
← Route 461	→ Route 463

Route 462, also known as Point au Mal Road, is a 18.5-kilometre-long (11.5 mi) north–south highway on the western coast of Newfoundland in the Canadian province of Newfoundland and Labrador. It connects the communities of Fox Island River and Point au Mal with Route 460 and the town of Port au Port.

== Route description ==
Route 462 begins at an intersection with Route 460 in Port au Port and it winds its northward through hilly terrain along the coastline to leave town and pass through rural areas for several kilometres. The highway now enters the designated place of Fox Island River-Point au Mal and passes through community of Point au Mal before entering Fox Island River, where Route 462 comes to a dead end at the community's harbour along the river of the same name.

== Major intersections ==
Location	km	mi	Destinations	Notes
Port au Port	0.0	0.0	Route 460 (Port au Port Highway/French Ancestors Route) to Route 1 (TCH) – Stephenville, Stephenville, Cape St. George	Southern terminus
Fox Island River	18.5	11.5	Dead End	Northern terminus
1.000 mi = 1.609 km; 1.000 km = 0.621 mi
