= Long Gull Pond =

Lake in Canada

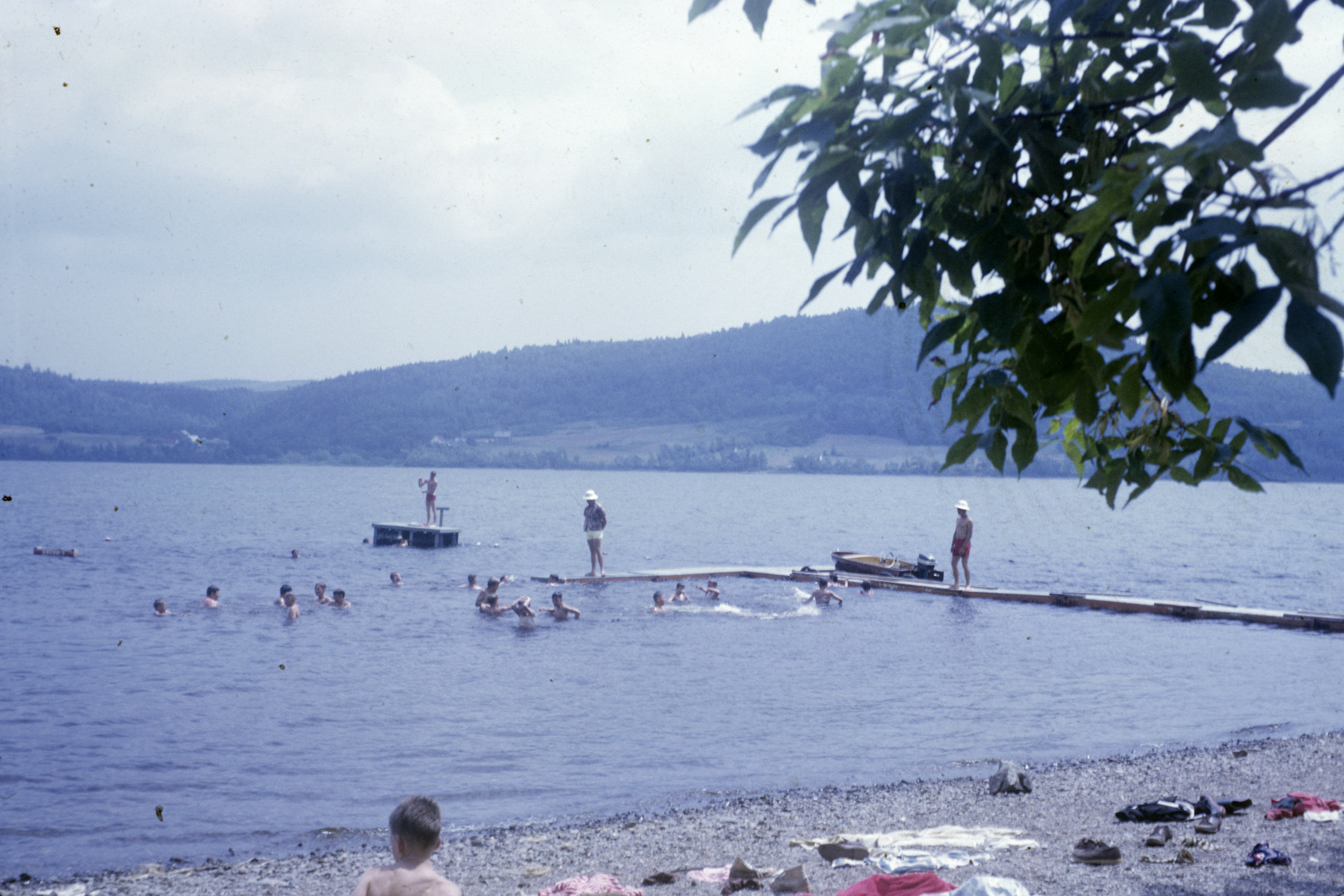
- Swimming (1964)

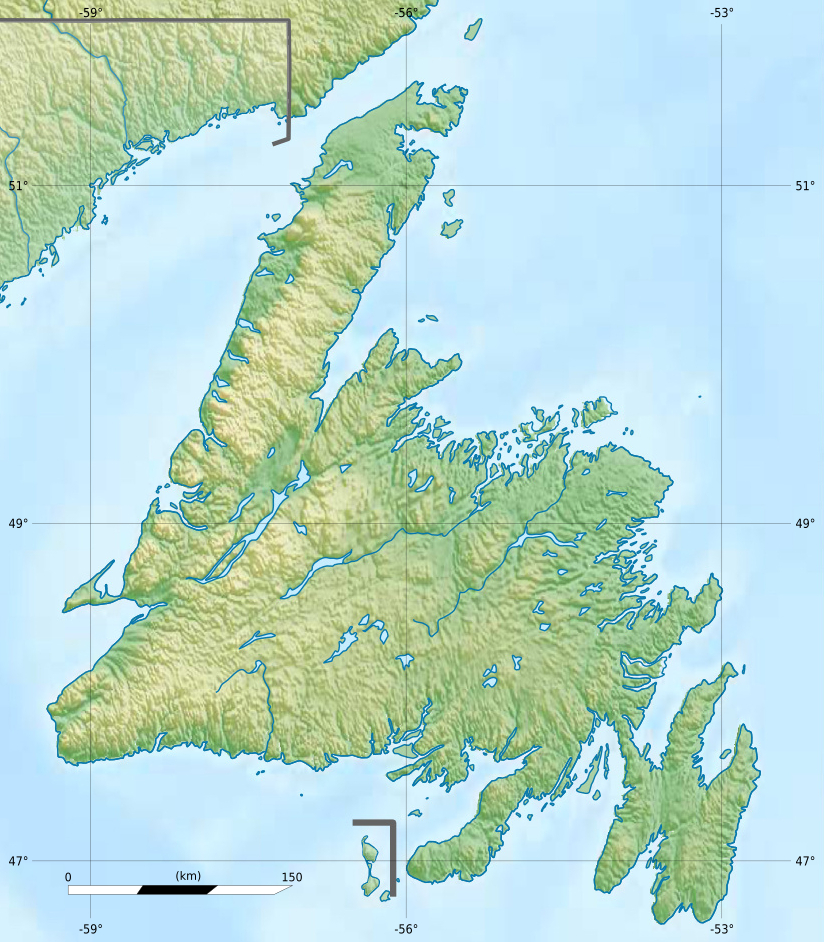
- Location within Newfoundland
- Location: Newfoundland
- Coordinates: 48°33′53″N 58°26′19″W
- Basin countries: Canada

Long Gull Pond is a 7.0 kilometres (4 mi)-long lake located in the western part of the island of Newfoundland in the Canadian province of Newfoundland and Labrador.

Route 460 runs along its southern shore, connecting Stephenville and Stephenville Crossing.

This section of Route 460, called the Hanson Memorial Highway, was constructed during the 1950s by the United States Army Corps of Engineers who were stationed at Ernest Harmon Air Force Base. The highway made the lake more accessible and it has become a popular recreation area for Stephenville. The lake was once stocked with fish by the Indian Head Rod and Gun Association.

In recent years, Gull Pond has become a year-round residence for many retirees. This transformation has led to conflicts between the club members and the Town of Stephenville over fire protection and taxes.

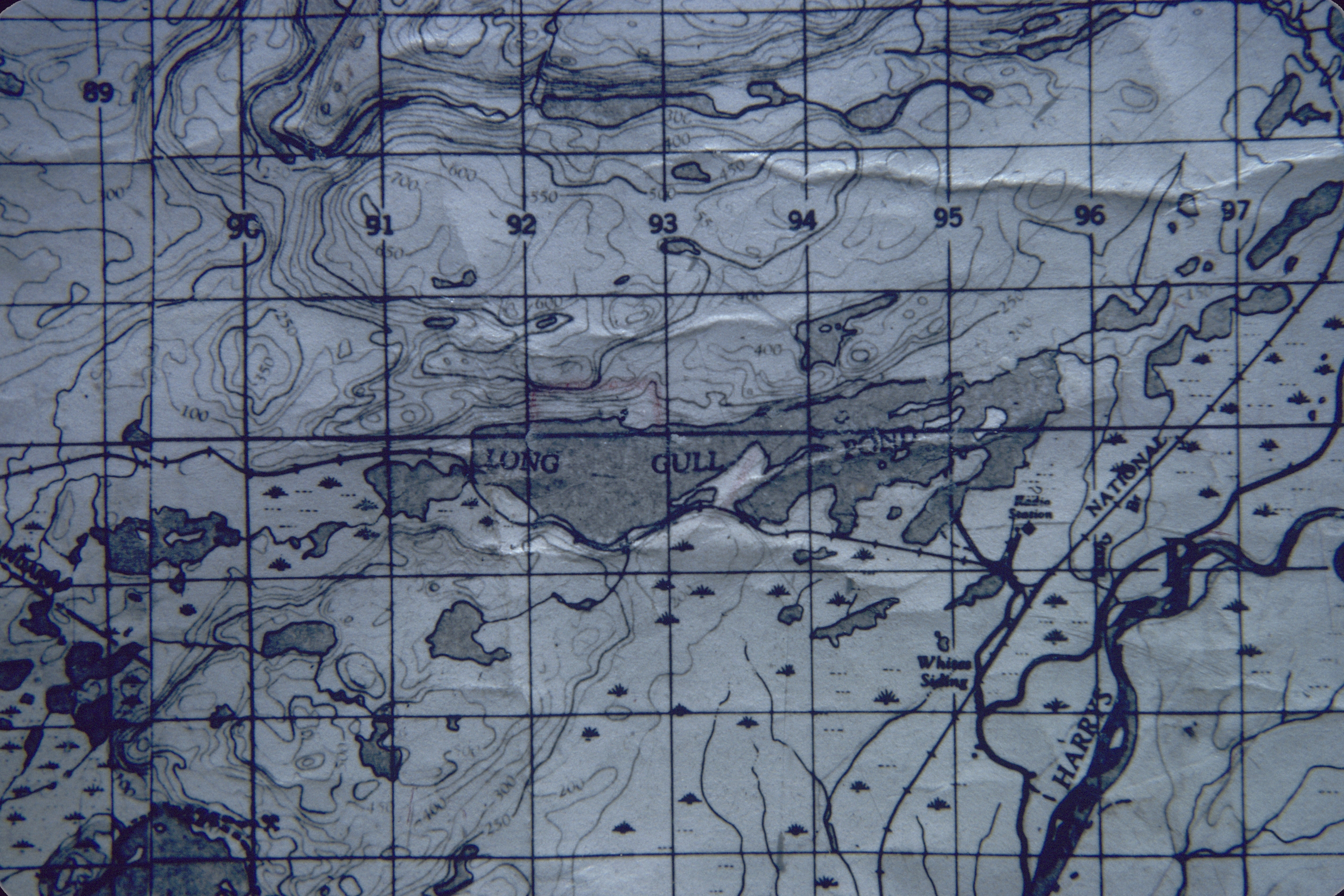
Map

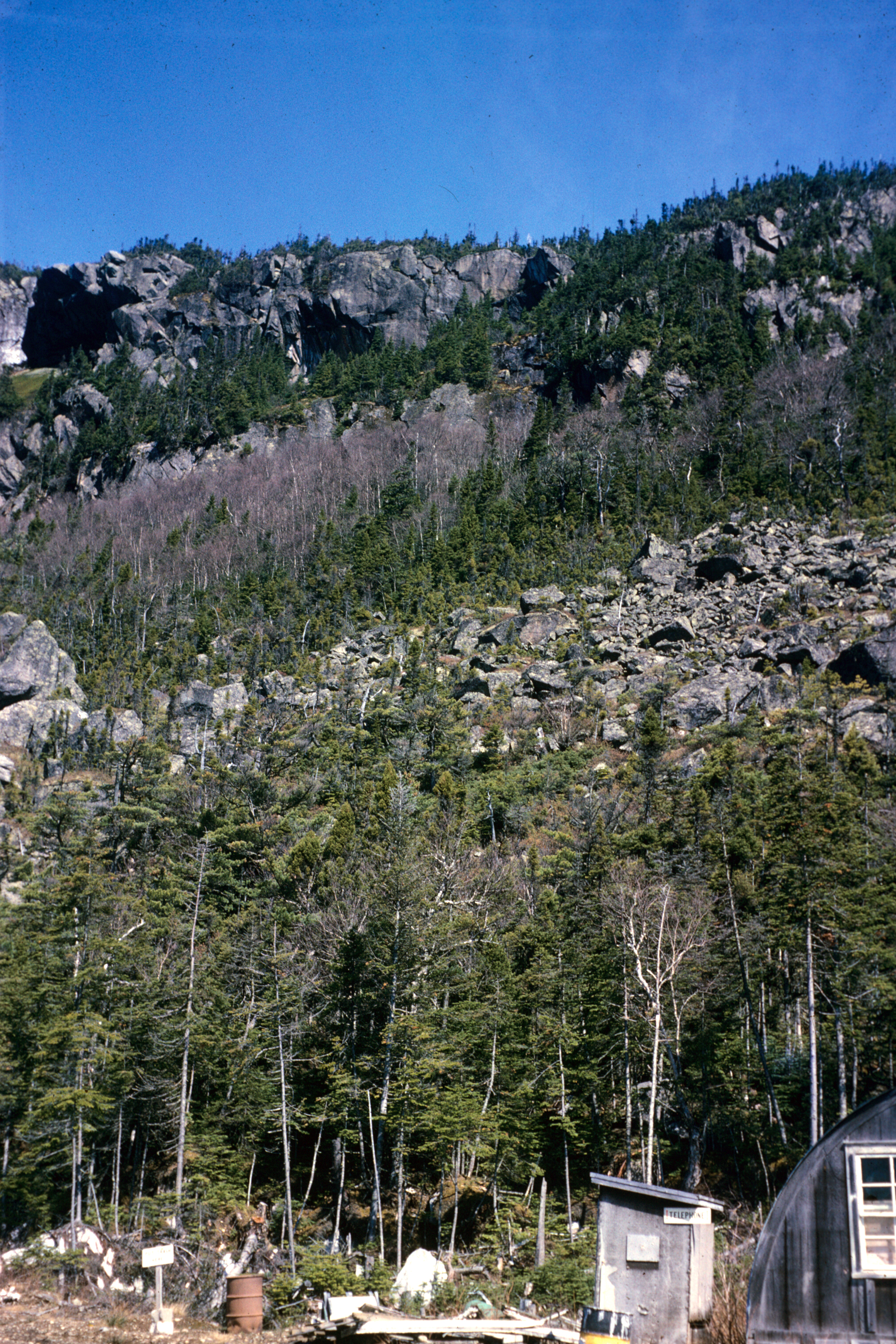
Gull Pond Ciffs 2002

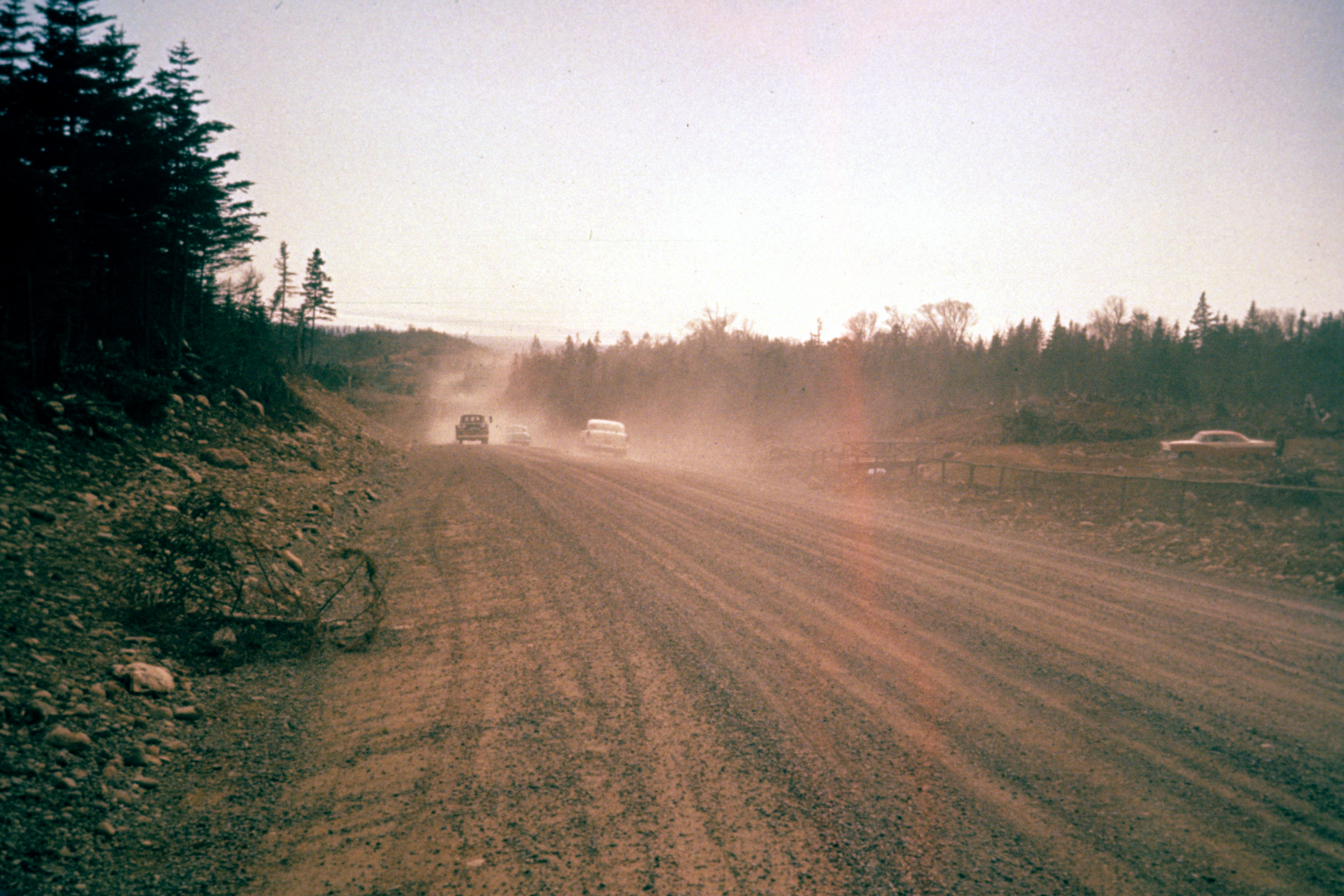
Hanson Highway leading to LGP
