= Berry Head, Newfoundland and Labrador =

Island in Newfoundland and Labrador, Canada

Barry Head
- Interactive map of Barry Head

Geography
- Location: Newfoundland and Labrador, Canada
- Coordinates: 48°48′4″N 53°37′41″W

Administration
- Canada

Berry Head is an island (Division No. 7, Subd. D) Newfoundland and Labrador, Canada.

It is not to be confused with Berry Head, a settlement swallowed up by Port au Port East; Berry Head Arch a natural feature on the coast near Lawler Bay; or Berry Head Cove in the Little Bay Islands area, all in Newfoundland.
