= Port au Port Bay =

Bay in the Canadian province of Newfoundland and Labrador

Coordinates: 48°39′43″N 58°49′29″W

Location of Port au Port Bay in Newfoundland

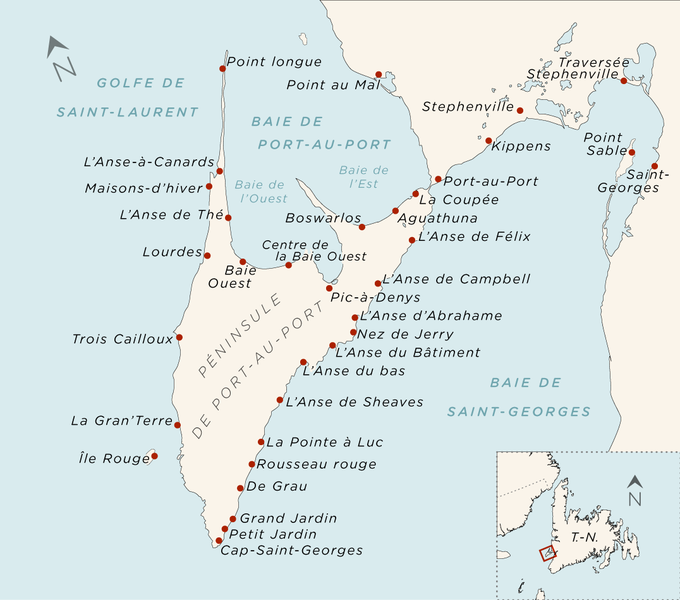
Port-au-Port Peninsula

Port au Port Bay (French: baie de Port-au-Port) located on the west coast of the Island of Newfoundland formed by a long narrow point of land of the Port au Port Peninsula and the area of Newfoundland known as the Lewis Hills, in the Canadian province of Newfoundland and Labrador.

The bay is further divided by a natural long point of land which forms two other bays, West Bay and East Bay. It is separated from Isthmus Bay to the south by two narrow gravel isthmi.
