= West Bay (Newfoundland and Labrador) =

Natural bay in Newfoundland and Labrador, Canada

Coordinates: 48.616°N 58.898°W

West Bay is a natural bay on the island of Newfoundland in the province of Newfoundland and Labrador, Canada.
