= Isthmus Bay =

Natural bay in Newfoundland and Labrador, Canada

Coordinates: 48.550°N 58.715°W

Isthmus Bay is a natural bay on the island of Newfoundland in the province of Newfoundland and Labrador, Canada. It is a sub-bay of St. George's Bay and is flanked by the town of Port-au-Port. It is separated from Port au Port Bay by two narrow gravel isthmi.
