= Port au Port, Newfoundland and Labrador =

Canadian rural community

Coordinates: 48°33′N 58°44′W

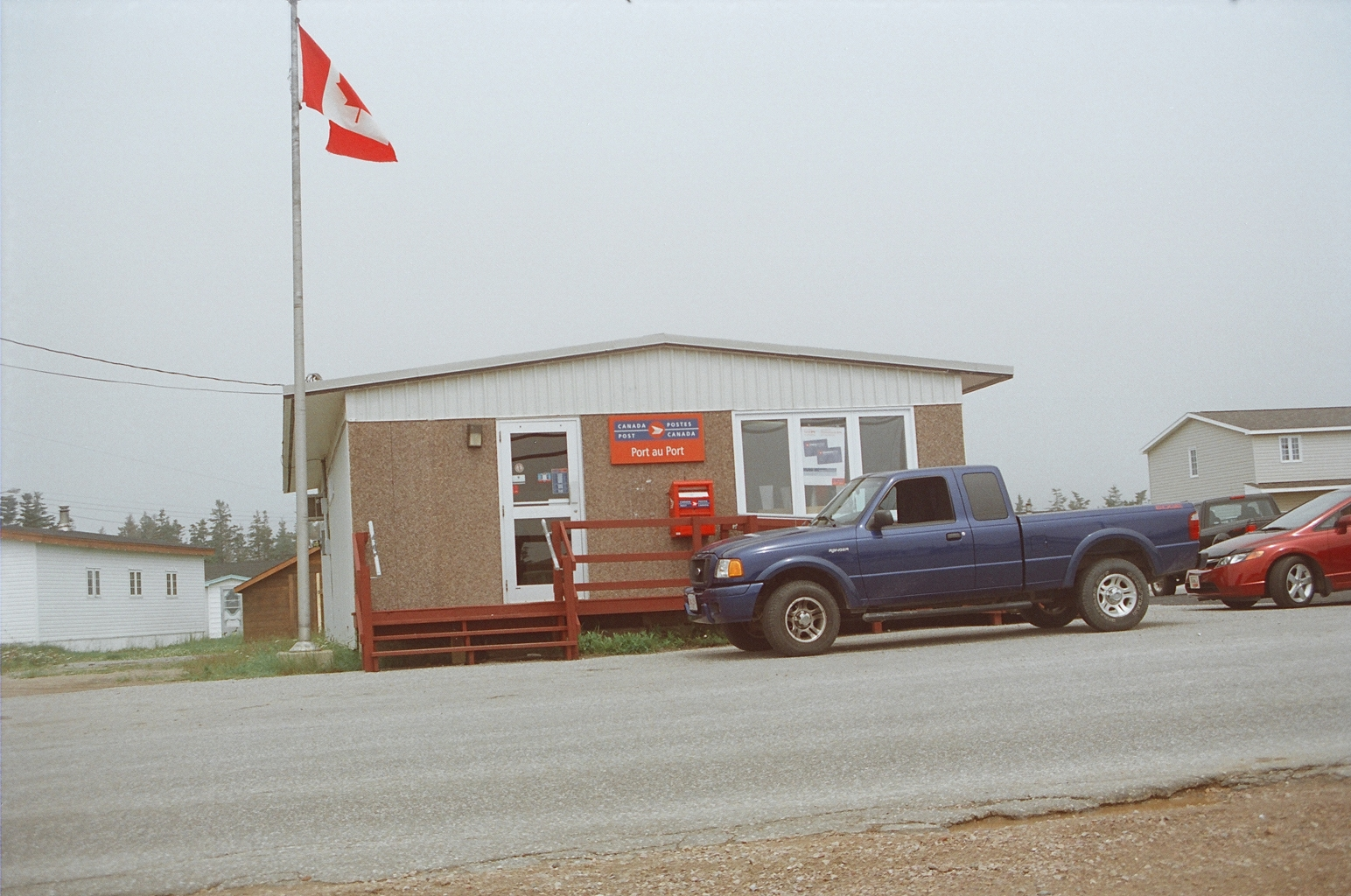
Post office in Port au Port

Port au Port is a small Canadian rural community located in the western part of the island of Newfoundland. Port au Port is situated on the isthmus connecting the main part of the island of Newfoundland to the Port au Port Peninsula to the west, with Isthmus Bay being to the south. Port au Port is located on Route 460, several kilometres west of the town of Stephenville and the village of Kippens, at its intersection with Route 462. Port au Port is located with the town limits of Port au Port East.

== See also ==
- List of communities in Newfoundland and Labrador
