= Tea Cove =

Locality in Newfoundland and Labrador, Canada

Coordinates: 48°39′02″N 58°57′20″W

Tea Cove is a locality in the Canadian province of Newfoundland and Labrador, located northwest of Stephenville, Newfoundland and Labrador.

== See also ==
- List of communities in Newfoundland and Labrador
