= Port au Port East =

- Town
- Interactive map of Port au Port East
- Coordinates: 48°34′50″N 58°40′16″W
- Country: Canada
- Province: Newfoundland and Labrador

Population (2021)
  - Total: 413
- Time zone: UTC-3:30 (Newfoundland Time)
  - Summer (DST): UTC-2:30 (Newfoundland Daylight)
- Area code: 709
- Highways: Route 460; Route 462

Port au Port East is a town in the Canadian province of Newfoundland and Labrador, situated on the shore of Isthmus Bay. The town had a population of 413 in the Canada 2021 Census. The town consists of the unincorporated communities of Port au Port and Romaines.

== Demographics ==
In the 2021 Census of Population conducted by Statistics Canada, Port au Port East had a population of 413 living in 198 of its 220 total private dwellings, a change of −28.7% from its 2016 population of 579. With a land area of 25.06 km^{2} (9.68 sq mi), it had a population density of 16.5/km^{2} (42.7/sq mi) in 2021.

== See also ==
- List of cities and towns in Newfoundland and Labrador
