= Cape St. George, Newfoundland and Labrador =

Cape St. George Cap Saint-Georges (French)
- Town
- Nickname: Kwesowaak - end of the land
- Location of Cape St. George in Newfoundland
- Coordinates: 48°28′12″N 59°15′00″W
- Country: Canada
- Province: Newfoundland and Labrador
- Census division: #4

Government
  - Mayor: Stella Cornect

Population (2021)
  - Total: 809
- Time zone: UTC-3:30 (Newfoundland Time)
  - Summer (DST): UTC-2:30 (Newfoundland Daylight)
- Area code: 709
- Highways: Route 460; Route 463

Cape St. George is a headland and community of the same name, located at the southwestern tip of the Port au Port Peninsula on the Canadian island of Newfoundland.

The headland marks the northwestern limit of St. George's Bay.

The town is associated with the Franco-Newfoundlander and Mi'kmaq community, and may also be referred to as Cap Saint-Georges in French. In addition to the main townsite of Cape St. George itself, the municipal boundaries also encompass the settlements of Petit Jardin, Grand Jardin, De Grau, Red Brook, Loretto and Marches Point. Boutte du Cap Park is also included within the town's boundaries.

== Demographics ==
In the 2021 Census of Population conducted by Statistics Canada, Cape St. George had a population of 809 living in 380 of its 433 total private dwellings, a change of −5.2% from its 2016 population of 853. With a land area of 34.47 km^{2} (13.31 sq mi), it had a population density of 23.5/km^{2} (60.8/sq mi) in 2021.
