= Sheaves Cove =

Local service district in Newfoundland and Labrador, Canada

Coordinates: 48°31′3.2″N 59°3′31.1″W

Location of Sheaves Cove

Sheaves Cove is a local service district and designated place in the Canadian province of Newfoundland and Labrador. It is on the Port au Port Peninsula along the shore of St. George's Bay. There is a small tourist alcove just off the highway (Route 460) where views of the waterfalls and the ocean are visited often.

== Geography ==
Sheaves Cove is in Newfoundland within Subdivision E of Division No. 4.

== Demographics ==
As a designated place in the 2016 Census of Population conducted by Statistics Canada, Sheaves Cove recorded a population of 66 living in 35 of its 41 total private dwellings, a change of -43.6% from its 2011 population of 117. With a land area of 3.15 km^{2} (1.22 sq mi), it had a population density of 21.0/km^{2} (54.3/sq mi) in 2016.

== Government ==
Sheaves Cove is a local service district (LSD) that is governed by a committee responsible for the provision of certain services to the community. The chair of the LSD committee is Wanda Lamb.

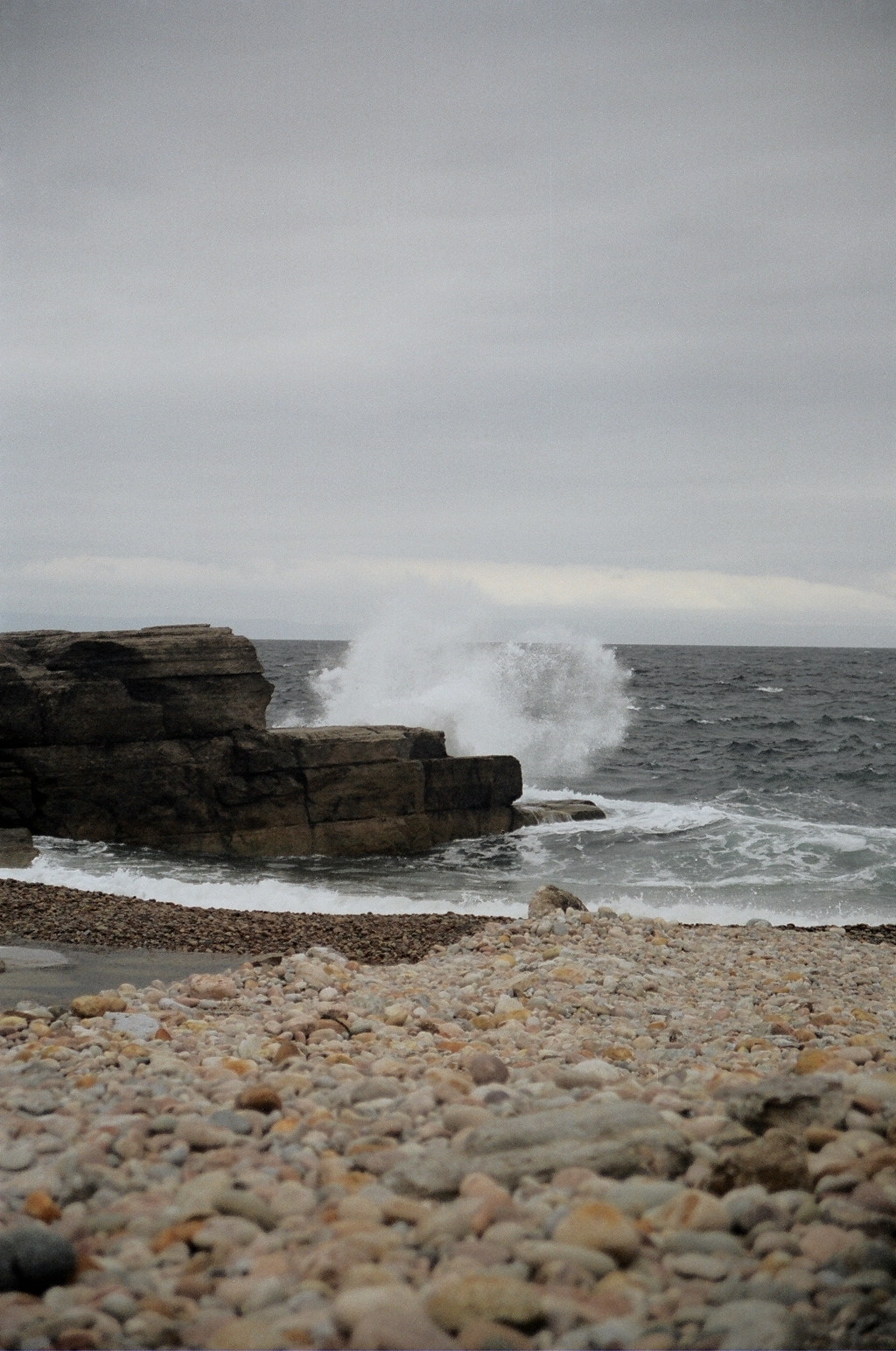

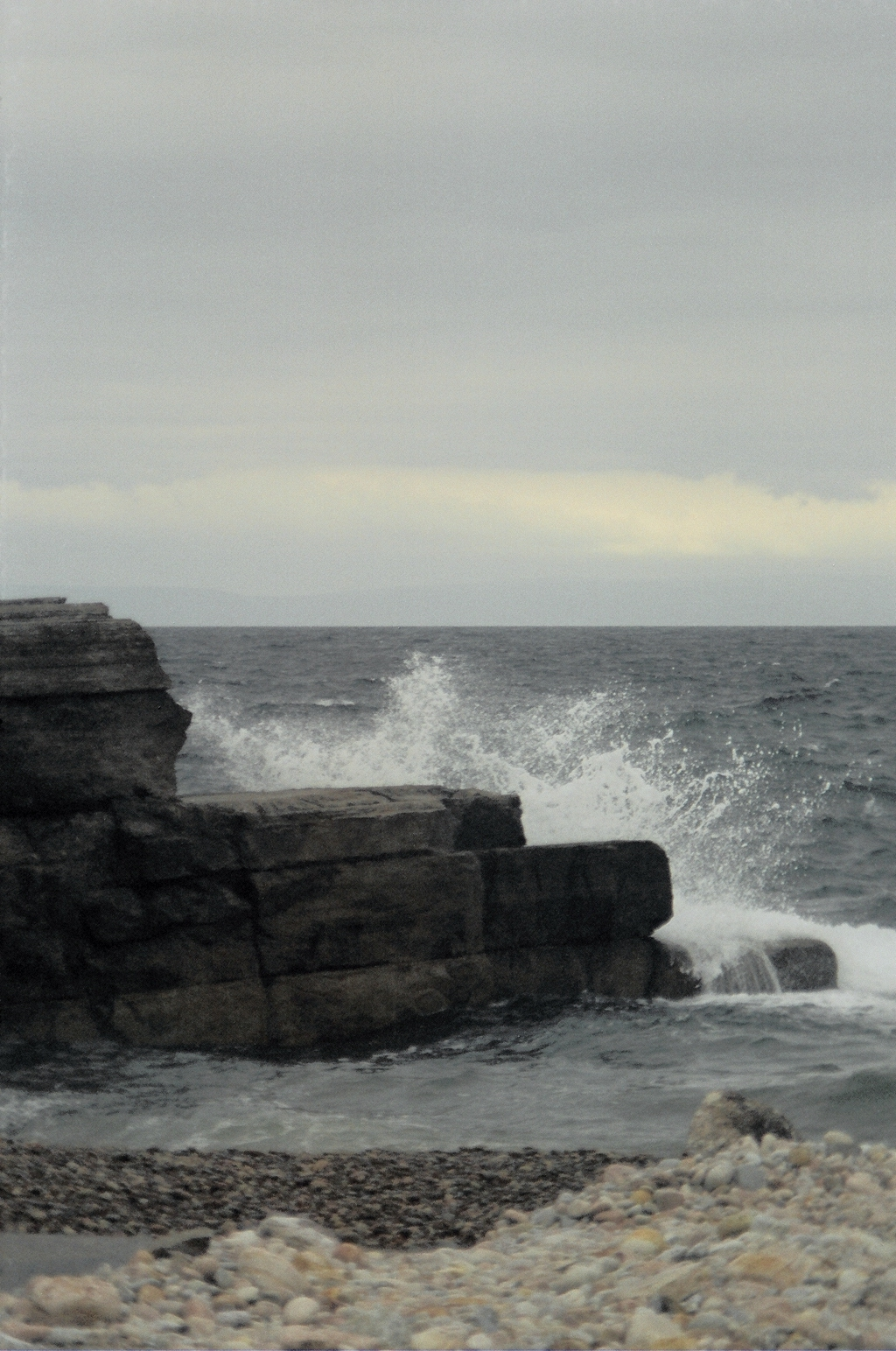

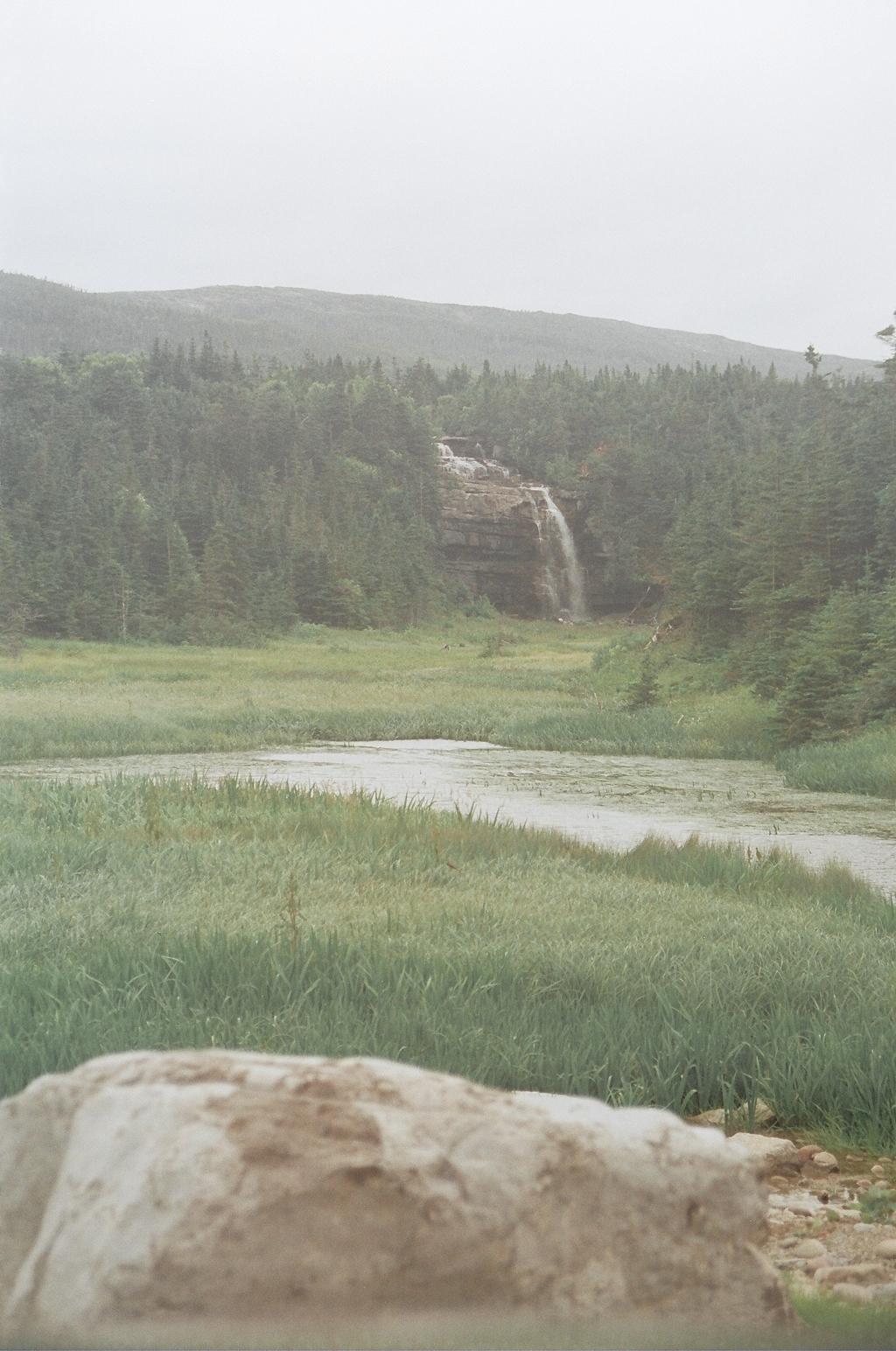

== See also ==
- List of communities in Newfoundland and Labrador
- List of designated places in Newfoundland and Labrador
- List of local service districts in Newfoundland and Labrador
