= Stephenville Crossing =

- Town
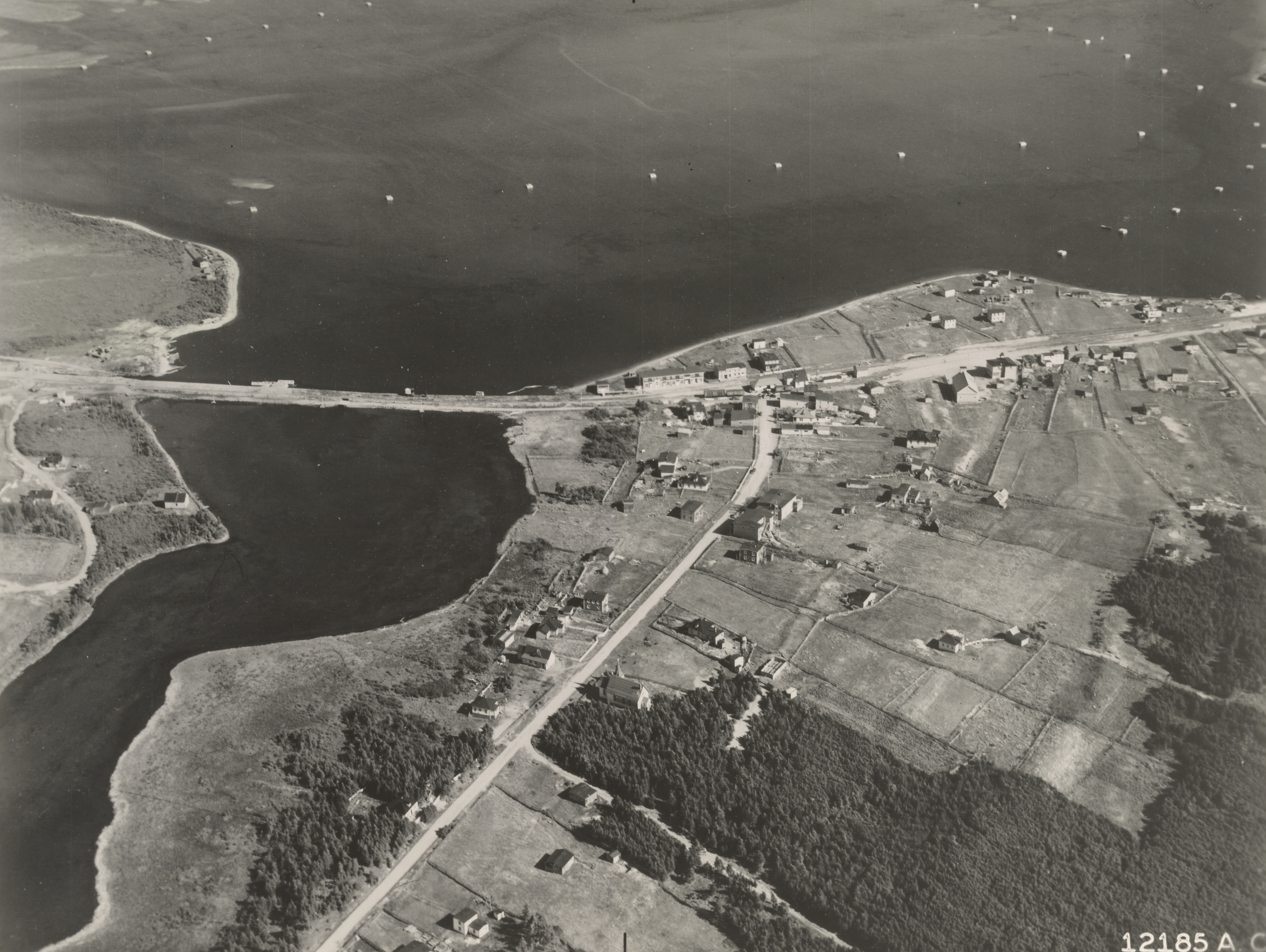
- Stephenville Crossing in 1940
- Nickname: 'crossing' 'xing' or 'zing'
- Location of Stephenville Crossing in Newfoundland
- Coordinates: 48°31′N 58°25′W
- Country: Canada
- Province: Newfoundland and Labrador

Government
  - Mayor: Lisa Lucas
  - Governing body: Stephenville Crossing Town Council
  - MHA: Hal Cormier (PC)
  - MP: Carol Anstey (CPC)

Area
  - Total: 80.8 km^{2} (31.20 sq mi)

Population (2021)
  - Total: 1,634
  - Density: 55.1/km^{2} (143/sq mi)
- Time zone: UTC-3:30 (Newfoundland Time)
  - Summer (DST): UTC-2:30 (Newfoundland Daylight)
- Area code: 709
- Highways: Route 460; Route 461; Route 490
- Website: http://www.thetownofstephenvillecrossing.com/

Stephenville Crossing (2021 population: 1,634) is a town in the Canadian province of Newfoundland and Labrador. It is on the island of Newfoundland at the easternmost limit of Bay St. George.

== History ==
The settlement derives its name from the Newfoundland Railway, which ran through the community on its way from Port aux Basques to Corner Brook.

The Hanson Memorial Highway was constructed by the United States Army Air Forces (USAAF) to link the railway line at Stephenville Crossing with Harmon Field, which was under construction on the other side of a hill to the north, in Stephenville. Later, the USAAF built its railway line from Stephenville Crossing to Stephenville.

Since the air base was constructed, Stephenville Crossing has functioned more or less as a suburb of Stephenville but there is an almost fifteen-minute car drive between both towns.

The 1988 abandonment of the railway in Newfoundland by CN resulted in the last train running through Stephenville Crossing to St. George's (return) on June 6, 1990.

In February 2024, the "Gut Bridge", a trestle bridge built in 1942 to accommodate trains (until 1989) and then ATV's was torn down due to safety concerns with the bridge's structure. In 2006, the entire bridge was closed for public use. The gut bridge replaced an original bridge built in the late 19th century.

== Geography ==
Stephenville Crossing is on the west coast of the island of Newfoundland within Division No. 4. It is part of an area referred to as Bay St. George.

== Demographics ==
In the 2021 Census of Population conducted by Statistics Canada, Stephenville Crossing had a population of 1,634 living in 751 of its 826 total private dwellings, a change of −4.9% from its 2016 population of 1,719. With a land area of 31.07 km^{2} (12.00 sq mi), it had a population density of 52.6/km^{2} (136.2/sq mi) in 2021.

== Attractions ==
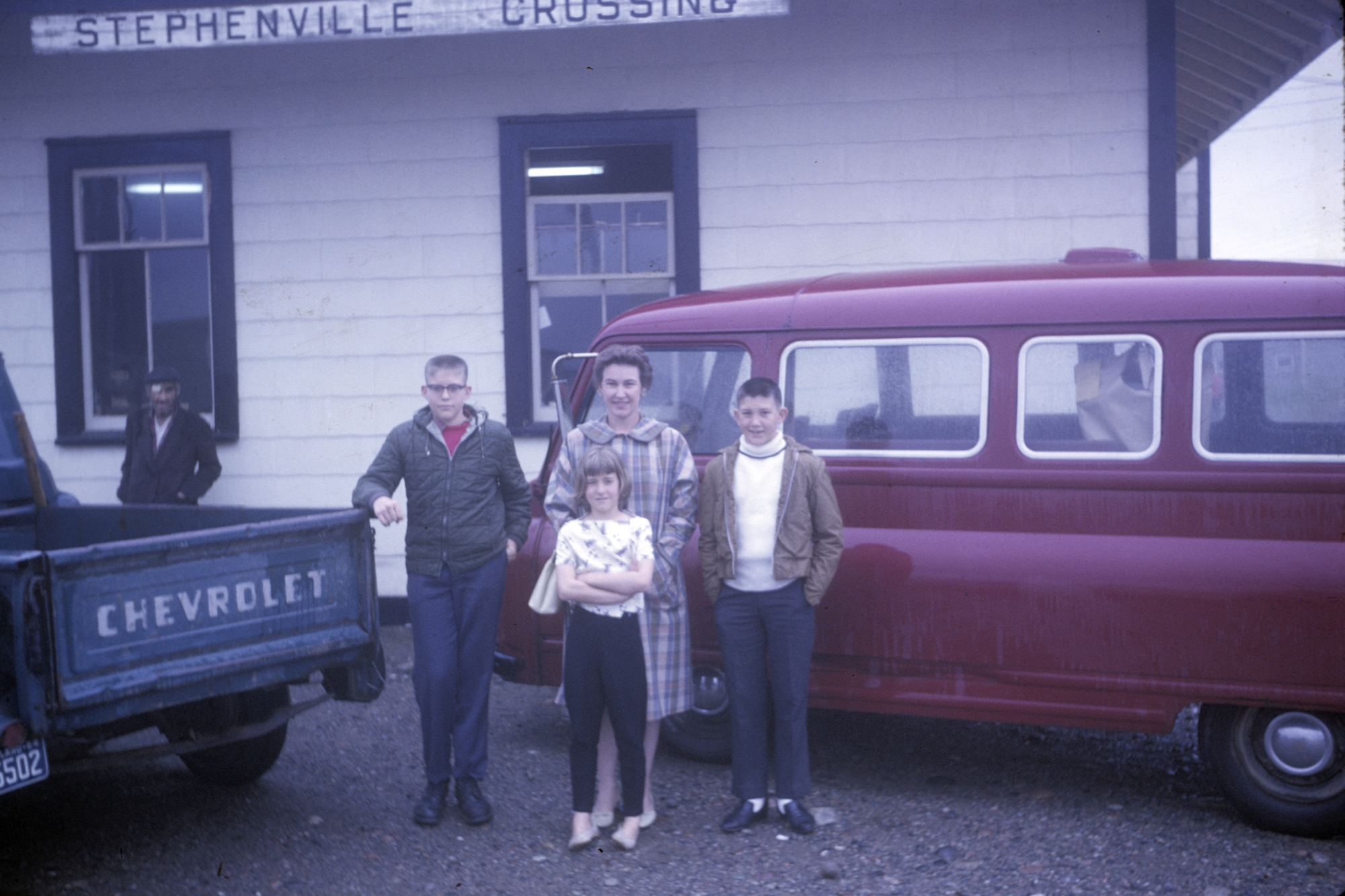
Stephenville Crossing railway station in 1965.

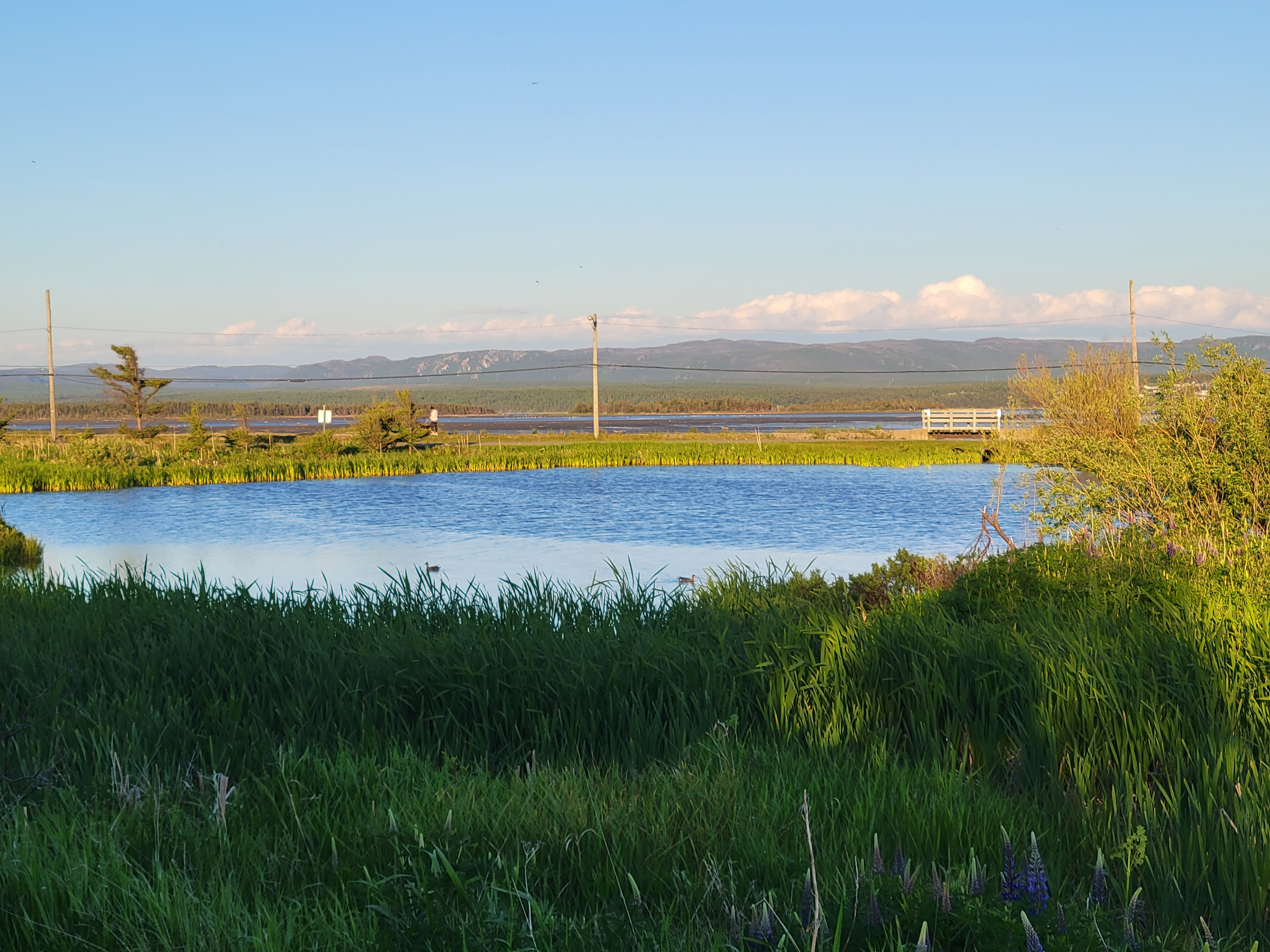
"The Prairie", a wetlands sanctuary in Stephenville Crossing.

Stephenville Crossing has amenities such as a four-pump gas station, a federal post office, two pharmacies, a grocery store, a convenience store, two building supplies stores, a volunteer fire department, a K-8 elementary school (including a pre-school program), a public library, and a bar. It is also home to the last of the province's "traditional" coin-op amusement operators (JBL Amusements).

The town has a medical clinic, a provincial long-term care home and a search and rescue unit. The Barachois Search and Rescue assists authorities in water rescues and finding missing persons.

A public assisted-care facility called The Bay St.George Long-Term Care Centre opened in 1976 (expanded in the mid-1980s) serving the entire Bay St. George area of over 15,000 people. The facility employs over 175 people and includes 114 beds offering 24/7 complete care to residents with diminished capabilities, including a 22-bed protective care unit.

== Education ==
St. Michael's Elementary School is a Kindergarten to grade 8 primary/elementary school located on Hospital road. The facility educates an estimated 125 pupils and employs close to 30 staff members. Facilities inside include a science lab, an art room, a music room, a large gymnasium, and a cafeteria. It was officially opened in December 1976.

The Bay St. George Long Term Care Centre offers Clinicals and Preceptorships for Personal Care Attendants and Licensed Practical Nurses during their education programs.

== See also ==
- List of communities in Newfoundland and Labrador
- List of designated places in Newfoundland and Labrador
