= St. George's, Newfoundland and Labrador =

St. George's South Side, Little Bay
- Town
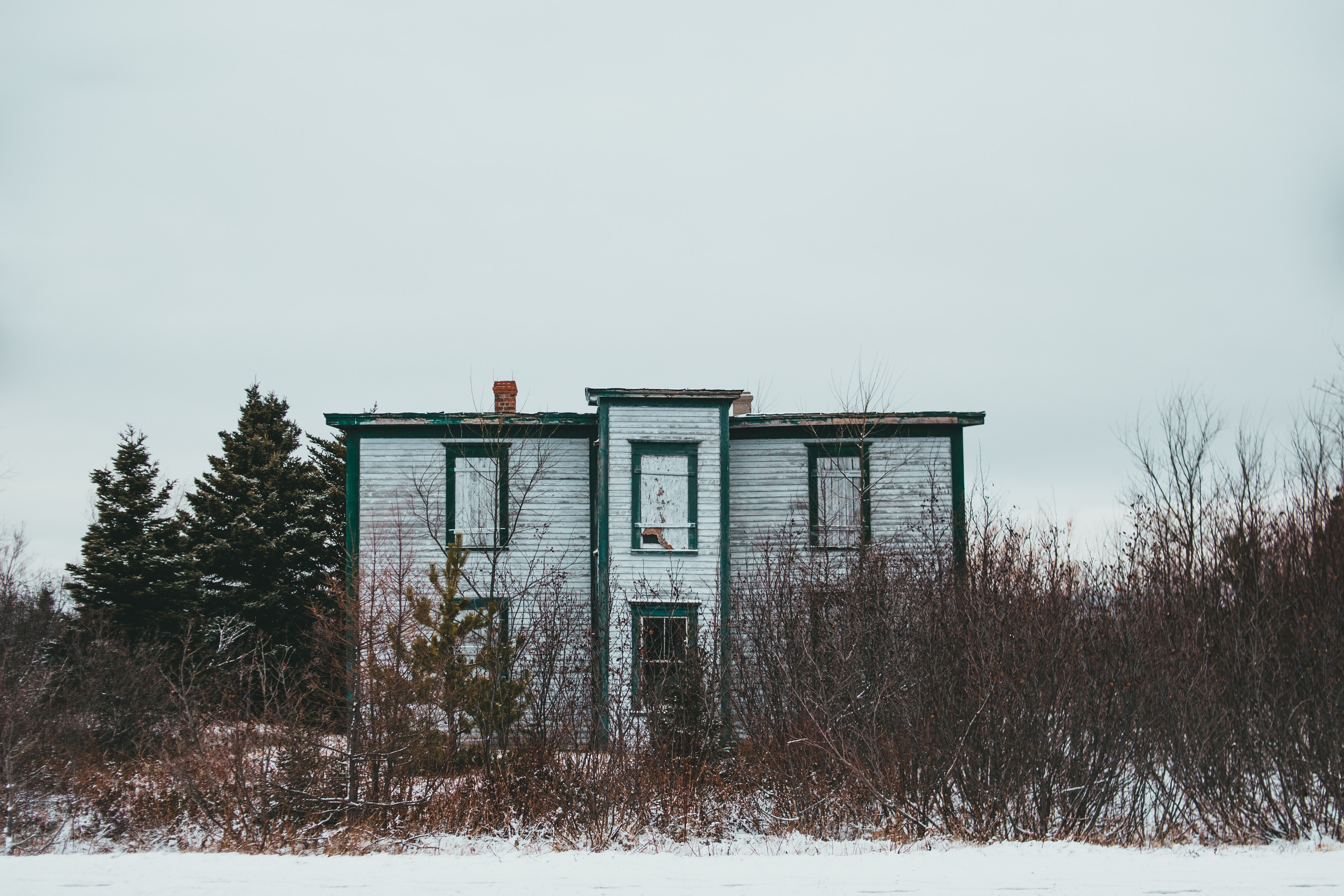
- Saltbox home in St. George's

- Location of St. George's in Newfoundland
- Coordinates: 48°25′39″N 58°28′40″W
- Country: Canada
- Province: Newfoundland and Labrador
- Settled: 18th century

Government
  - Mayor: Conrad White
  - Governing body: St.George's Town Council
  - MHA: Scott Reid (Lib)
  - MP: Gudie Hutchings (Lib)

Population (2021)
  - Total: 1,139
- Time zone: UTC-3:30 (Newfoundland Time)
  - Summer (DST): UTC-2:30 (Newfoundland Daylight)
- Area code: 709
- Highways: Route 1 (TCH); Route 461
- Website: St. George's official website

St. George's is a Canadian community in the St. George's Bay on the southwest coast of Newfoundland of the province of Newfoundland and Labrador.

The community, originally known as South Side or Little Bay has its origins in the French fishery of the seventeenth century when the good natural harbour would attract fishermen to spend the summer in the area and return to France for the winter months. Permanently settled in the eighteenth century, the community remained a fishing village for nearly 200 years until the advent of the railroad. As of 2024, a large salt deposit has been found in the region and development proposals are underway.

== Mi'kmaq ==
Mi'kmaq villages in St. Georges Bay and Placentia existed in 1594. Jeannot Pequidalouet - the eastern Mi'kmaq chief of Cape Breton, who had previously overwintered in Newfoundland - began to create permanent settlements in St. George's Bay and Miawpukek in the 1760s. In May 1767 when James Cook was mapping Newfoundland coast, he met a tribe of Mi'kmaq in St. George's Bay.

== Early fisheries ==
In the seventeenth century the French fishermen spent the summer months in St. Georges harbour and returned to France for the winter. They began to overwinter in the eighteenth century and St. Georges continued to be a fishing village "for nearly 200 years until the advent of the railroad."

== After the railroad ==
The railroad came to Western Newfoundland in 1898, and because of the work that the railway created, as well as access to many different types of goods, many people from outlying communities flocked to St. George's. The town quickly became a major centre in Western Newfoundland. The town became a distributor of goods to the surrounding area and the Port au Port Peninsula. Lumbering, fishing and farming were the primary occupations and lobster plants also opened there. A brewery/distillery also operated there for a short time at the turn of the century. The community also became the seat of the magistrate in the area and a courthouse was constructed.

== Demographics ==
In the 2021 Census of Population conducted by Statistics Canada, St. George's had a population of 1,139 living in 543 of its 611 total private dwellings, a change of −5.3% from its 2016 population of 1,203. With a land area of 25.71 km^{2} (9.93 sq mi), it had a population density of 44.3/km^{2} (114.7/sq mi) in 2021.

== Attractions ==
St. Georges once hosted an Annual Blueberry Festival every August at Blueberry Hill which ran for 25 consecutive years .

Sandy Point, located 3.5 kilometres south of Stephenville, is an uninhabited 2,471-acre (1,000-hectare) island of natural wealth in St. Georges Bay.

Black Bank is a black sand beach and former provincial park with tree lined embankments.

== See also ==
- List of cities and towns in Newfoundland and Labrador
