= Lourdes, Newfoundland and Labrador =

Lourdes Doors
- Town

- Location of Lourdes in Newfoundland
- Coordinates: 48°38′54″N 58°59′50.3″W
- Country: Canada
- Province: Newfoundland and Labrador

Government

Population (2021)
  - Total: 502
- Time zone: UTC-3:30 (Newfoundland Time)
  - Summer (DST): UTC-2:30 (Newfoundland Daylight)
- Area code: 709
- Highways: Route 463

Lourdes is a town in the Canadian province of Newfoundland and Labrador. The town had a population of 465 in the Canada 2016 Census. The current mayor of Lourdes is Henry Gaudon.

The earliest settlers in the area came from Brittany in France. Originally, they came to fish around the western shores of Newfoundland and would return to France. However, eventually many started settling around the shores of the Port au Port Peninsula. Many took local Mi’kmaq women as wives.

Our Lady of Lourdes Parish, a Catholic church, contains a grotto which was built in 1987. A local stonemason, Michael Flavin, offered to carve a grotto into a natural outcrop of rock near the parish church. Flavin was reportedly inspired by the famous site in Lourdes, France, where the Virgin Mary had appeared to a young girl, he built a series of terraces and niches, creating a place for reflection and devotion. The Catholic Women's League of Our Lady of Lourdes Parish began raising funds, adding life-size statues of the Blessed Virgin Mary and Jesus the Redeemer. Later came a walkway, benches, and delicately carved Stations of the Cross. A rosary made of donated fishing buoys provides a nautical link between the parish and the sea. The site is a tourist attraction.

In 2015, a Chase the Ace lottery at Our Lady of Lourdes Parish received national attention due to the large jackpot.

== Demographics ==
In the 2021 Census of Population conducted by Statistics Canada, Lourdes had a population of 502 living in 227 of its 264 total private dwellings, a change of 8% from its 2016 population of 465. With a land area of 7.39 km^{2} (2.85 sq mi), it had a population density of 67.9/km^{2} (175.9/sq mi) in 2021.

== See also ==
- List of cities and towns in Newfoundland and Labrador
- Port au Port Peninsula
