= Kippens =

- Town
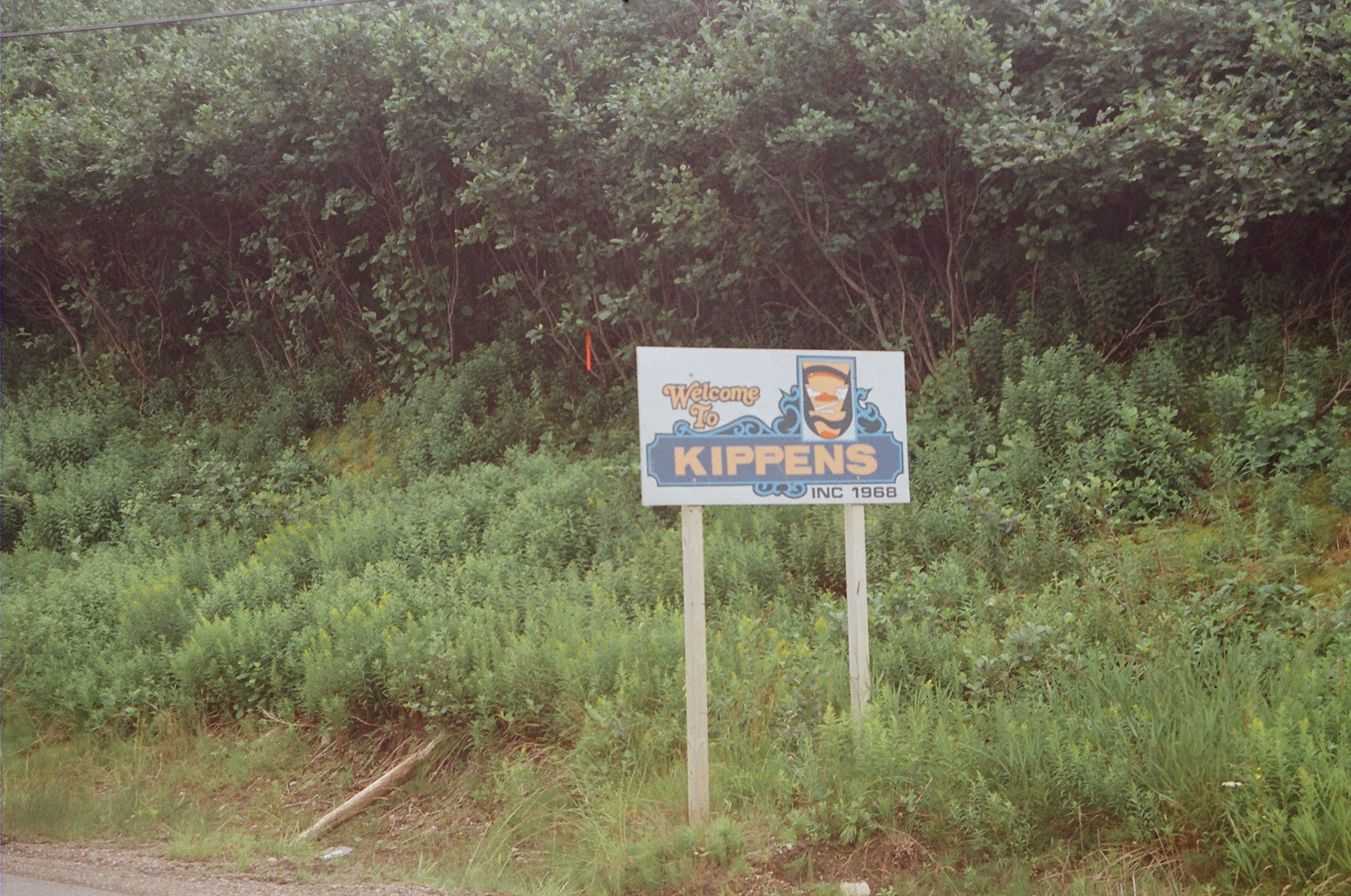
- Interactive map of Kippens
- Coordinates: 48°32′57″N 58°37′25″W
- Country: Canada
- Province: Newfoundland and Labrador
- Incorporated: 1968

Area
  - Total: 14.32 km^{2} (5.53 sq mi)

Population (2021)
  - Total: 1,842
  - Density: 140.3/km^{2} (363/sq mi)
- Time zone: UTC-3:30 (Newfoundland Time)
  - Summer (DST): UTC-2:30 (Newfoundland Daylight)
- Area code: 709
- Highways: Route 460
- Website: Town of Kippens

Kippens (Canada 2021 Census population 1,842) is a town located in the province of Newfoundland and Labrador, Canada on the west coast of the island of Newfoundland.

The town of Kippens is situated on the West Coast of the province of Newfoundland. The town was granted its municipality status on December 31, 1968. Kippens borders the town of Stephenville to the east, the town of Port au Port East to the west, and St. George's Bay to the south. Extensive tracts of forests mark the northern boundary of the community, and Romaine's River (also known as Kippens River) runs in an east–west direction along the northern boundary of the community. The town exists mainly as a residential suburb of Stephenville with very little industrial or commercial activity taking place in the town.

== Demographics ==
In the 2021 Census of Population conducted by Statistics Canada, Kippens had a population of 1,842 living in 760 of its 799 total private dwellings, a change of −8.3% from its 2016 population of 2,008. With a land area of 14.24 km^{2} (5.50 sq mi), it had a population density of 129.4/km^{2} (335.0/sq mi) in 2021.

== Transportation ==
Kippens is accessible by air with Stephenville International Airport. Located just 5 kilometres east of the town.

Kippens extends in an east–west direction along Route 460. The town, for the most part, is built immediately adjacent to the highway right-of-way, with most urban development extending within one kilometre to the north and south. The community is readily accessible to Stephenville on the east and the Port au Port Peninsula on the west by Route 460.

== Geography ==
Kippens sits on a rolling hill that extends north away from the coastline. From the beach, the land rises sharply to an elevation of approximately 50 feet. The beach and quick rise in elevation allow for homes to be built close to the ocean with attractive views and no risk of erosion. The hill slowly rises northward from this point, with a sharp rise beginning on the north side of Route 460.

Most suburban development is along streets that extend north of Route 460, on a plateau atop the hill. Despite the nature of the rolling hills, Kippens is known for vast tracts of flat land where most of its development has taken place.

== Recreation ==
Kippens boasts a nature/walking trail, soccer pitch, softball field, tennis court, basketball courts, dog park, community garden, beach volleyball court, playground, community centre, and campground.

Additionally, Kippens has partnered with the town of Stephenville to own/operate an indoor ice rink (Stephenville Dome), indoor swimming pool (Regional Aquatic Centre), and a YMCA. The town also hosts its own Canada Day celebrations and winter carnival each year.

"Kippens Rec" is a children's leisure and recreation program that runs during the summer months. The program entertains children through arts & crafts, as well as various sports and games.

== Gallery ==
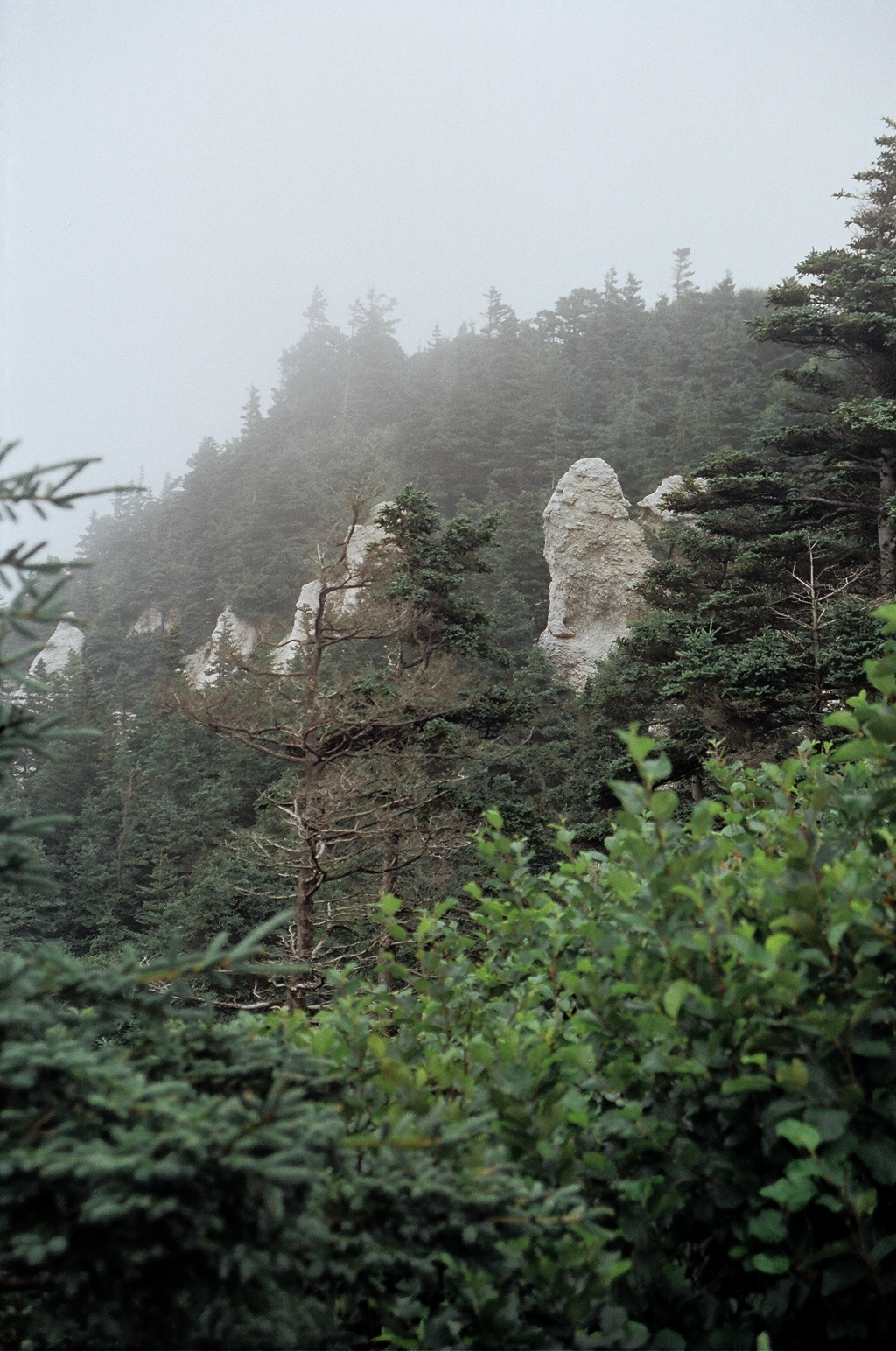

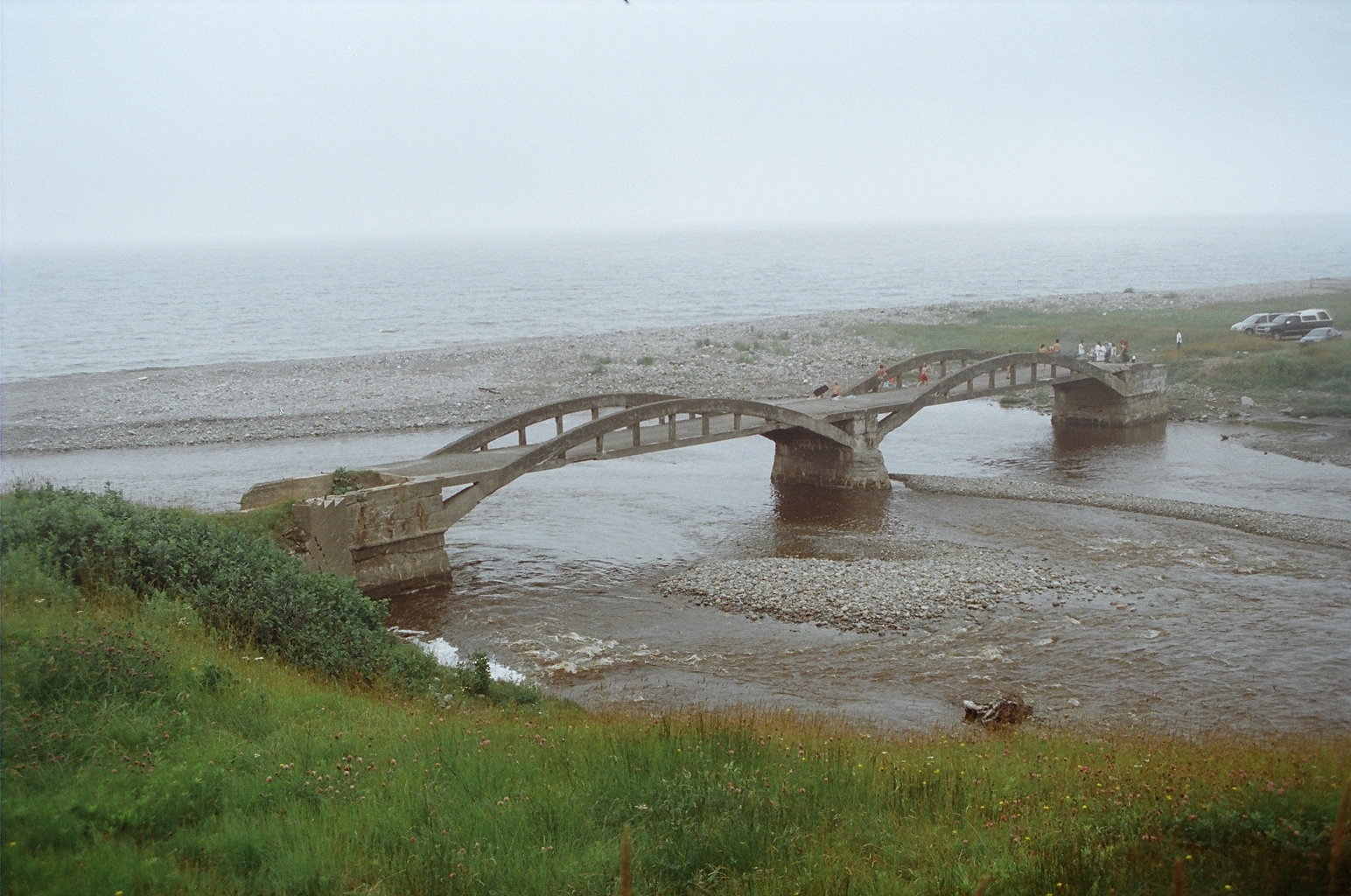

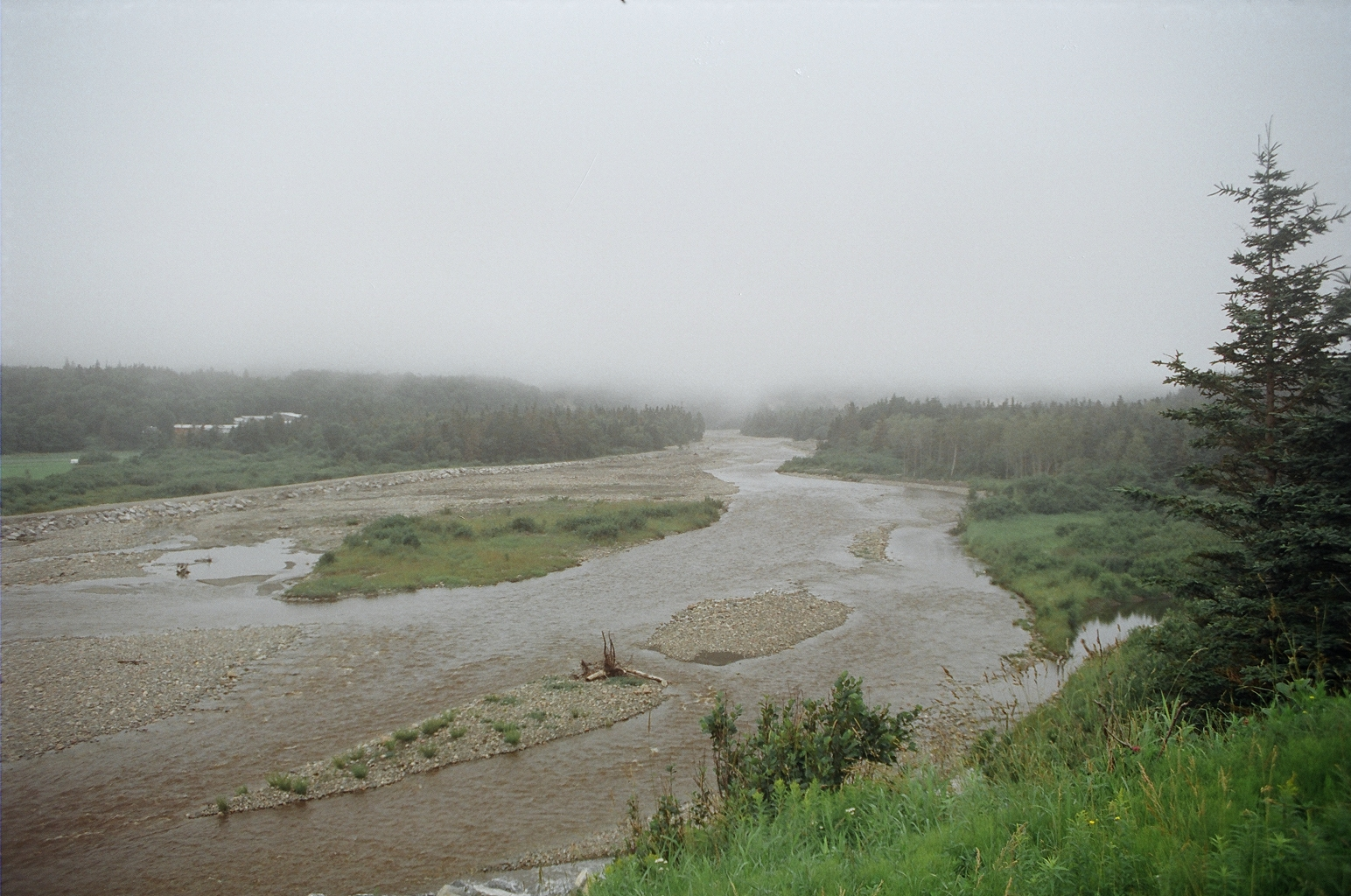
