= West Bay Centre =

Coordinates: 48°35′15.2″N 58°54′17.2″W

West Bay Centre is a small community on the Western coast of Newfoundland. The population is about 300.
