= Port au Port West-Aguathuna-Felix Cove =

- Town
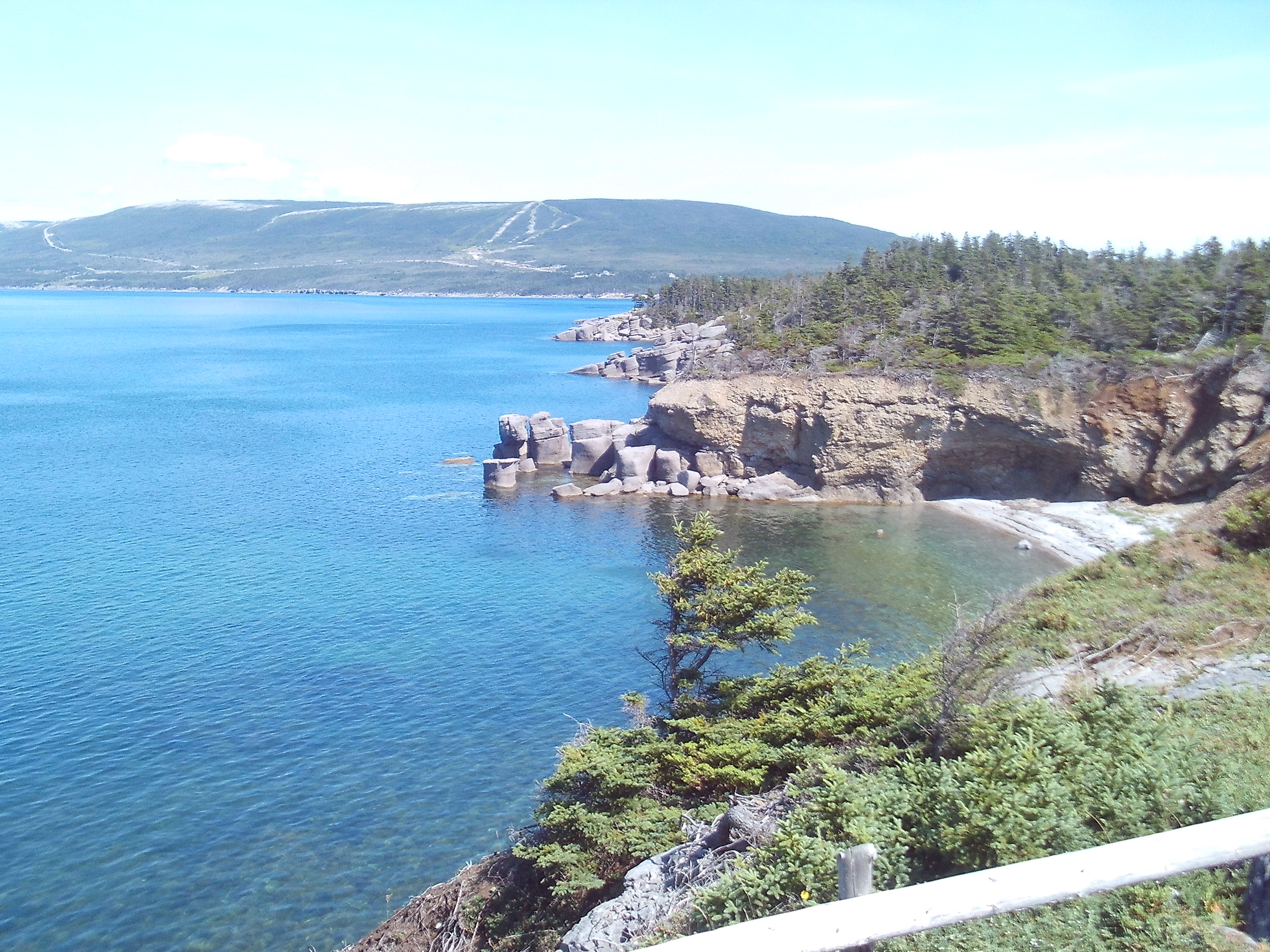
- The Gravels, walking trail in Port au Port

- Location of Port au Port West-Aguathuna-Felix Cove in Newfoundland
- Coordinates: 48°33′37″N 58°46′01″W
- Country: Canada
- Province: Newfoundland and Labrador
- Incorporated: 1970

Population (2021)
  - Total: 384
- Time zone: UTC-3:30 (Newfoundland Time)
  - Summer (DST): UTC-2:30 (Newfoundland Daylight)
- Area code: 709
- Highways: Route 460

Port au Port West-Aguathuna-Felix Cove is a small town located on the Port au Port Peninsula of the Island of Newfoundland, Canada. The nearest large service area is Stephenville. The town was created in 1970 by amalgamating the small villages of Port au Port West, Aguathuna and Felix Cove. Its post office began on September 11, 1964. The first Post Mistress was Reisa Gabriel.

== Aguathuna ==
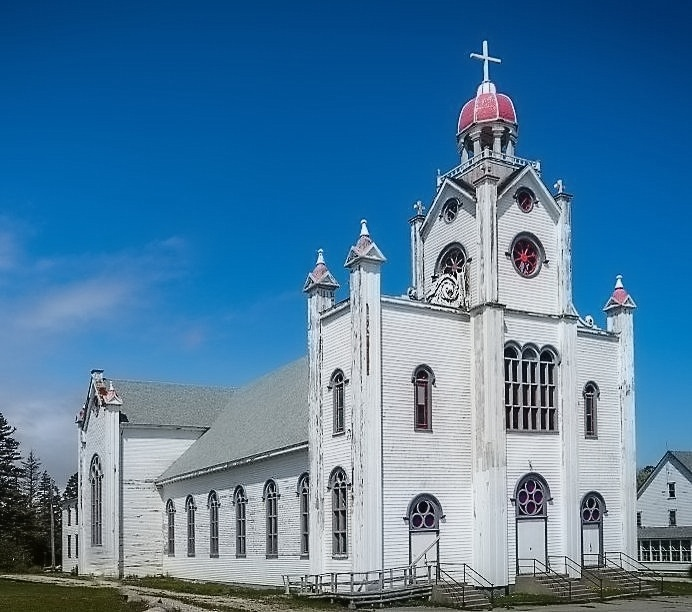
Our Lady of Mercy Church, completed in 1925, is a notable landmark within the community

The area grew from workers at the nearby limestone mine site at Jack of Clubs Cove. The Dominion Iron and Steel Company opened a quarry there in 1911. The quarry's manager, Arthur House, wanted to rename the cove from Jack of Clubs Cove as it would never have been treated with serious respect. The then Archbishop M.F. Howley suggested Aguathuna believing it to be a Beothuk word for white stone. That name was chosen by residents over the other alternative, Limeville.

== Demographics ==
In the 2021 Census of Population conducted by Statistics Canada, Port au Port West-Aguathuna-Felix Cove had a population of 384 living in 202 of its 225 total private dwellings, a change of −14.5% from its 2016 population of 449. With a land area of 16.97 km^{2} (6.55 sq mi), it had a population density of 22.6/km^{2} (58.6/sq mi) in 2021.

== See also ==
- List of cities and towns in Newfoundland and Labrador
