= Boswarlos =

Human settlement in Canada

Coordinates: 43.778°N 79.444°W

Location of Boswarlos in Newfoundland and Labrador

Boswarlos is a settlement in Newfoundland and Labrador, in Canada.

As of 2011, there were 140 people living in Boswarlos.
