= Fox Island River-Point au Mal =

Local service district in Canada

Coordinates: 48°39′00″N 58°39′00″W

Fox Island River-Point au Mal is a local service district and designated place in the Canadian province of Newfoundland and Labrador. It is northwest of Stephenville.

== Geography ==
Fox Island River-Point au Mal is in Newfoundland within Subdivision D of Division No. 4.

== Demographics ==
As a designated place in the 2016 Census of Population conducted by Statistics Canada, Fox Island River-Point au Mal recorded a population of 173 living in 77 of its 131 total private dwellings, a change of -10.8% from its 2011 population of 194. With a land area of 17.86 km^{2} (6.90 sq mi), it had a population density of 9.7/km^{2} (25.1/sq mi) in 2016.

== Government ==
Fox Island River-Point au Mal is a local service district (LSD) that is governed by a committee responsible for the provision of certain services to the community. The chair of the LSD committee is Jeff LeRoy.

== See also ==
- List of communities in Newfoundland and Labrador
- List of designated places in Newfoundland and Labrador
- List of local service districts in Newfoundland and Labrador
