= Port au Port Peninsula =

Peninsula in the Canadian province of Newfoundland and Labrador

Coordinates: 48.57°N 59.05°W

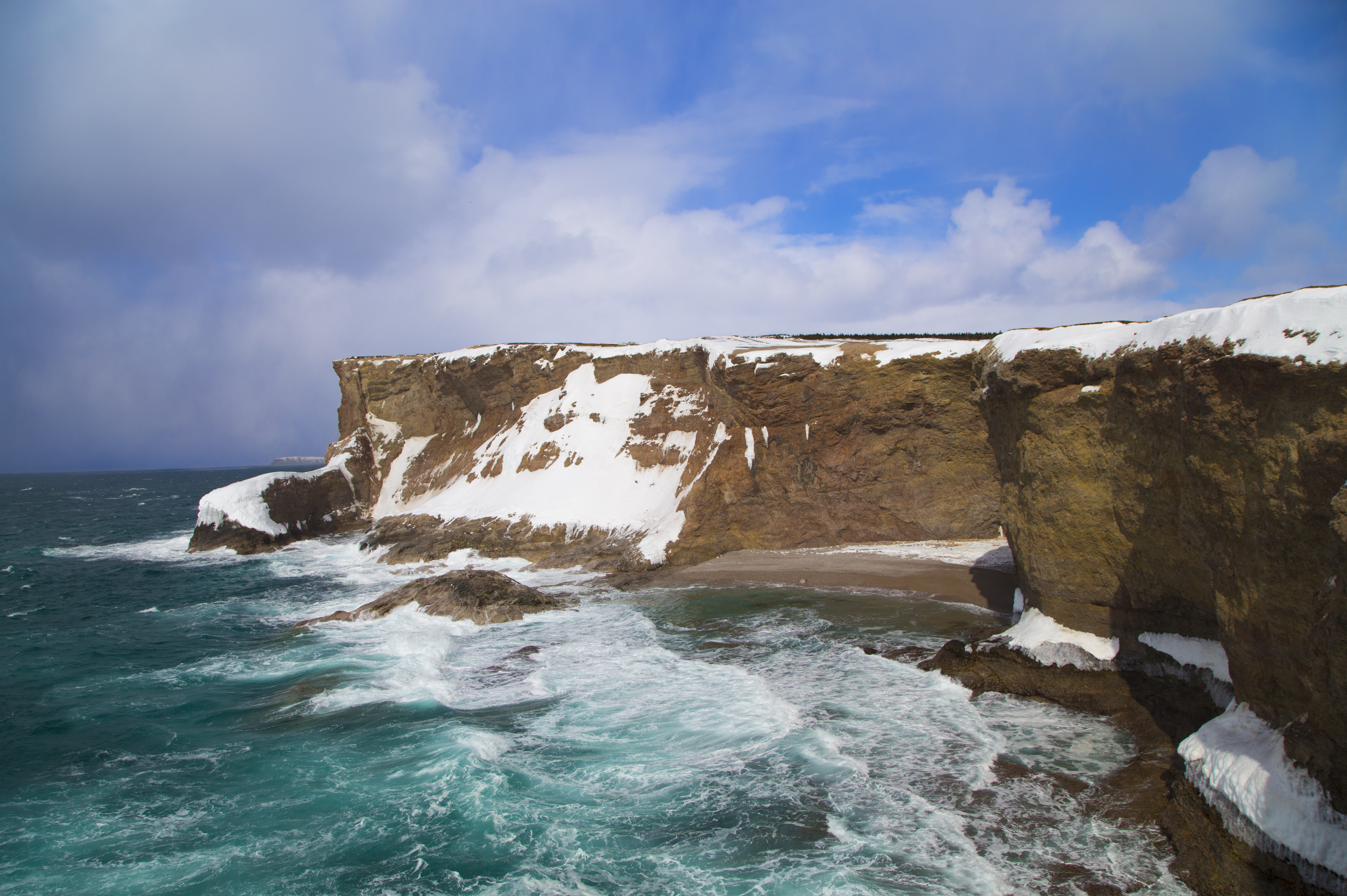
Winter in Boutte du cap park, Newfoundland

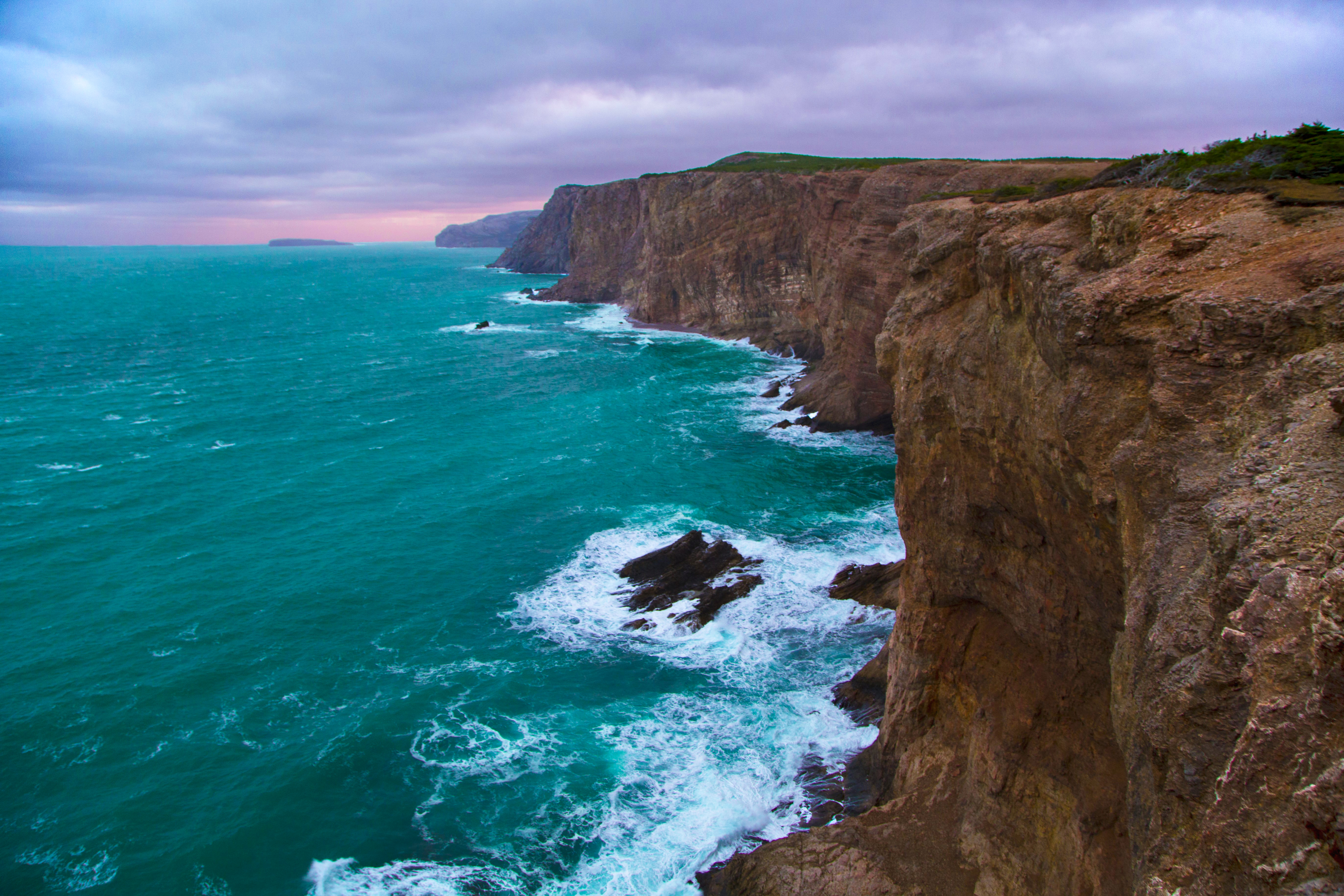
Seacliffs of Boutte du cap park

Location of Port au Port Peninsula in Newfoundland

The Port au Port Peninsula (French: péninsule de Port-au-Port; Mi'kmaq: Kitpu) is a peninsula in the Canadian province of Newfoundland and Labrador. Roughly triangular in shape, it is located on the west coast of the island of Newfoundland.

== Geography ==
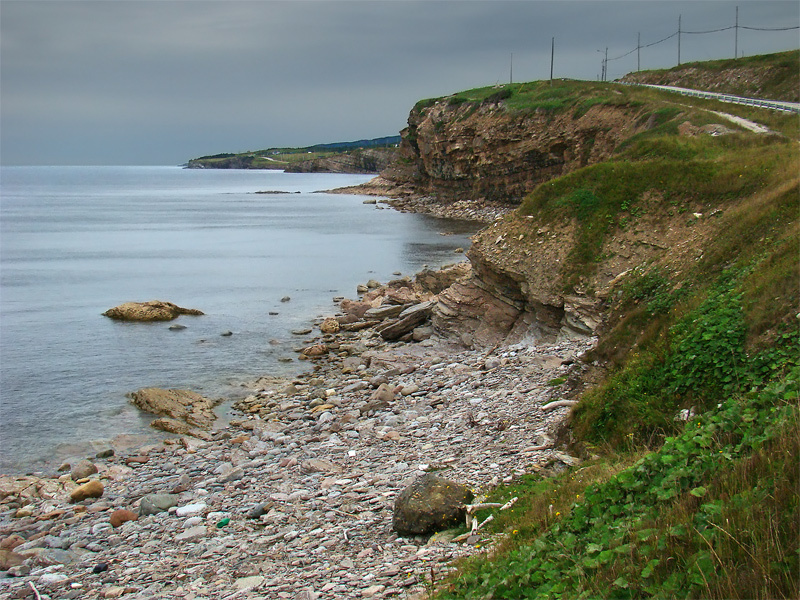
Along Route 460

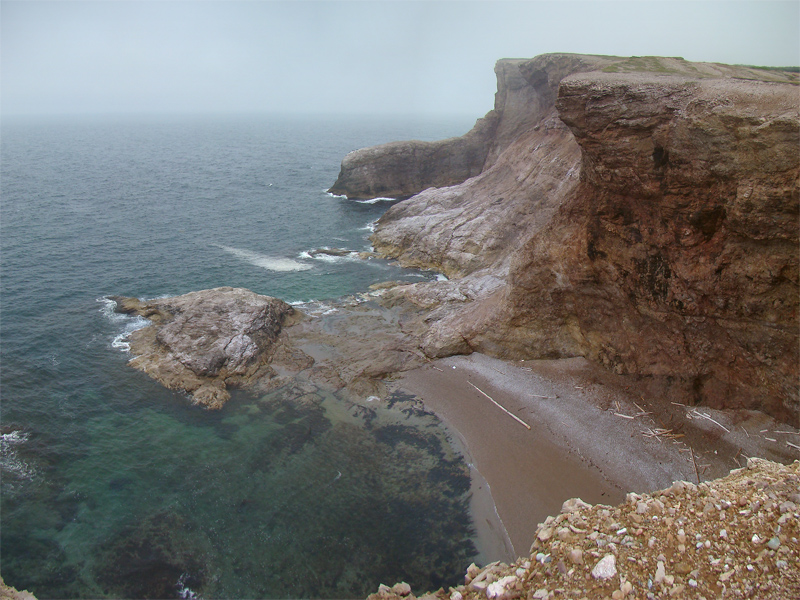
Park-Boutte du Cap

The peninsula extends into the Gulf of St. Lawrence and is joined to Newfoundland by a narrow isthmus connecting at the town of Port au Port. It is bounded on the south by Bay St. George, on the western side by the Gulf of St. Lawrence, and on the northwestern side by Port au Port Bay.

With a rocky shoreline measuring approximately 130 km in length, the peninsula extends approximately 40 km west from its isthmus to Cape St. George and northwest 50 km to the fingerlike Long Point which by itself is approximately 25 km in length. The eastern shore of the peninsula is irregular, jutting into Port au Port Bay.

The Port au Port Peninsula is located on the western edge of the heavily eroded Appalachian Mountain chain which runs along Newfoundland's west coast. There are no natural harbours along the peninsula's rocky coastline. The peninsula was once heavily forested, but many areas along its shores have been cleared for subsistence farming.

The southern shore is hilly, with the northern shore having a sloping lowland extending to a low rise along the centre of the eastern part of the peninsula. The geological structure is complex, with the peninsula's sedimentary strata dating to the middle Cambrian to early Ordovician continental margin, creating a carbonate platform of limestone, shale, and sandstone. The heavily folded geological structure in the area has been identified as having an unknown amount of petroleum reserves.

== History ==
The area was named "Ophor portu" (port of rest) by Basque fishermen during the 16th-17th centuries. French and Basque fishermen used the west coast of Newfoundland, including the Port au Port Peninsula, for seasonal fishing settlements; however, some began permanently inhabiting the area. Mi'kmaq families, who came from Nova Scotia with the French to fight the British in the Thirty Years' War, were also present in the area.

During and after the Treaty of Utrecht in 1713 and Treaty of Paris in 1763, France retained the right to use the west coast of the island. This area came to be known as the "French Shore," and the Port au Port Peninsula was at its centre.

Scattered settlement continued in the area until 1904, when France relinquished its right of use to the "French Shore". The Port au Port Peninsula represents the most varied ethnic and linguistic mix in the entire island of Newfoundland, including Mi'kmaq families with the highest proportion of French-speaking settlement on the island (15%).

The French minority, a mix of Mi'kmaq, Acadian, French and Basque, has had an important influence on the area's culture. Newfoundland's unique folk music has been somewhat influenced by musicians from the Port au Port Peninsula, notably Émile Benoît. Additionally, the area's strong Roman Catholic tradition is reflected in the high visibility accorded to churches throughout the peninsula's communities.

As the centre of the province's Franco-Newfoundlander community, the peninsula has been designated the only bilingual district on the island of Newfoundland since 1971.

== Economy ==
The Port au Port Peninsula's economy is based on natural resources, namely fishing. Limited forestry takes place in the unsettled areas of the interior, and a small amount of subsistence farming takes place along coastal areas. Many residents of the peninsula, particularly the communities at the eastern end near the isthmus, work in nearby Kippens and Stephenville.

Beginning in 1900, a limestone quarrying operation was established at Aguathuna, near the peninsula's isthmus, where the Table Head mountain ridge extends from the Lewis Hills. The limestone was used by Dominion Steel and Coal Corporation at a steel mill in Sydney, Nova Scotia. The quarry was closed in 1966 following DOSCO's financial difficulties.

From 1941 to 1966, many people in the eastern end of the peninsula were employed at Ernest Harmon AFB in nearby Stephenville.

From the 1970s to present, a major limestone quarry began operating at Lower Cove employing 30-40 people.

In the 1980s-1990s, petroleum companies began exploring the peninsula for oil. Some deposits were discovered in recoverable quantities, and limited production wells are in place at some locations. Geologists have estimated that a much larger deposit exists deeper and possibly off shore from the peninsula in the 400-500 billion barrel range; however, exploration drilling has not yet confirmed this theory.

The primary employer in Stephenville was a paper mill, which closed in 2005.

A Canadian energy company may soon get the green light to begin drilling for oil off Newfoundland's southwest coast. The Canadian Imperial Venture Corporation (CIVC) is waiting for approval from the federal-provincial oil regulator – the Canada Newfoundland and Labrador Offshore Petroleum Board – to drill a test well on Shoal Point, near the Port Au Port Peninsula. The company has been exploring in the area over the last few years. It discovered some oil there in 2008. "At the turn of the century there were several wells on the Port Au Port Peninsula, and Shoal Point, that produced somewhere between 20 to 25 barrels a day," said Kirby Mercer, CIVC's vice-president. "Now, we're going in with modern technology, modern tools. So we hope to extract the black gold using modern technology." Mercer said if the company receives approval for a test well and drilling is successful, CIVC hopes the Offshore Petroleum Board will then approve a significant discovery licence. That would bring the company one step closer to establishing an oil-producing well in western Newfoundland.

In 2022, a "hydrogen alliance" was forged between Canada and Germany. As part of this project, a network of 164 wind turbines was announced, taking advantage of the favorable wind conditions in Port au Port. However, the project has yet to undergo full environmental review.

Today travellers access the area using the Marine Atlantic ferry service to Channel-Port aux Basques or with the Stephenville International Airport.

== Communities ==
The Port au Port Peninsula is a relatively insular region and contains a collection of approximately 20 communities:

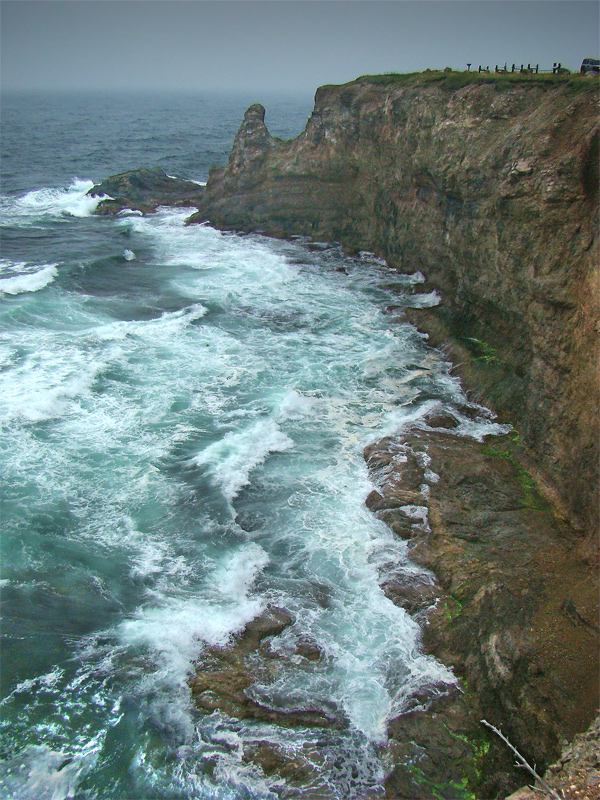
Park-Boutte du Cap

=== Southern Shore ===
Following Route 460:

- Port au Port
- Bellmans Cove
- Felix Cove
- Man of War Cove
- Campbells Cove
- Campbells Creek
- Abraham's Cove
- Jerry's Nose
- Ship Cove
- Lower Cove
- Sheaves Cove
- Marches Point
- De Grau
- Red Brook
- Grand Jardin
- Petit Jardin
- Cape St. George

=== Northern Shore ===
Following Route 463:

- Mainland
- Three Rock Cove
- Lourdes
- Winterhouse
- Black Duck Brook
- Blue Beach
- Long Point

=== Eastern Shore ===
Following Route 463 and local roads:

- Lourdes
- Tea Cove
- West Bay Centre
- Piccadilly
- Boswarlos
- Aguathuna

== See also ==
- Le Gaboteur
- List of communities in Newfoundland and Labrador
