= 376th =

376th may refer to:

- 376th Air Expeditionary Wing, inactive wing of the United States Air Force, last stationed at the Transit Center at Manas International Airport, Kyrgyz Republic
- 376th Air Refueling Squadron, inactive United States Air Force unit
- 376th Expeditionary Operations Group, provisional United States Air Force Air Combat Command unit
- 376th Fighter Squadron, inactive United States Air Force unit
- 376th Parachute Field Artillery Battalion (376th PFAB), inactive airborne field artillery battalion of the United States Army
- 376th Troop Carrier Squadron, inactive United States Air Force unit

== See also ==
- 376 (number)
- 376, the year 376 (CCCLXXVI) of the Julian calendar
- 376 BC
