= Louis L. Wilson Jr. =

United States Air Force general

Louis Locke Wilson Jr.
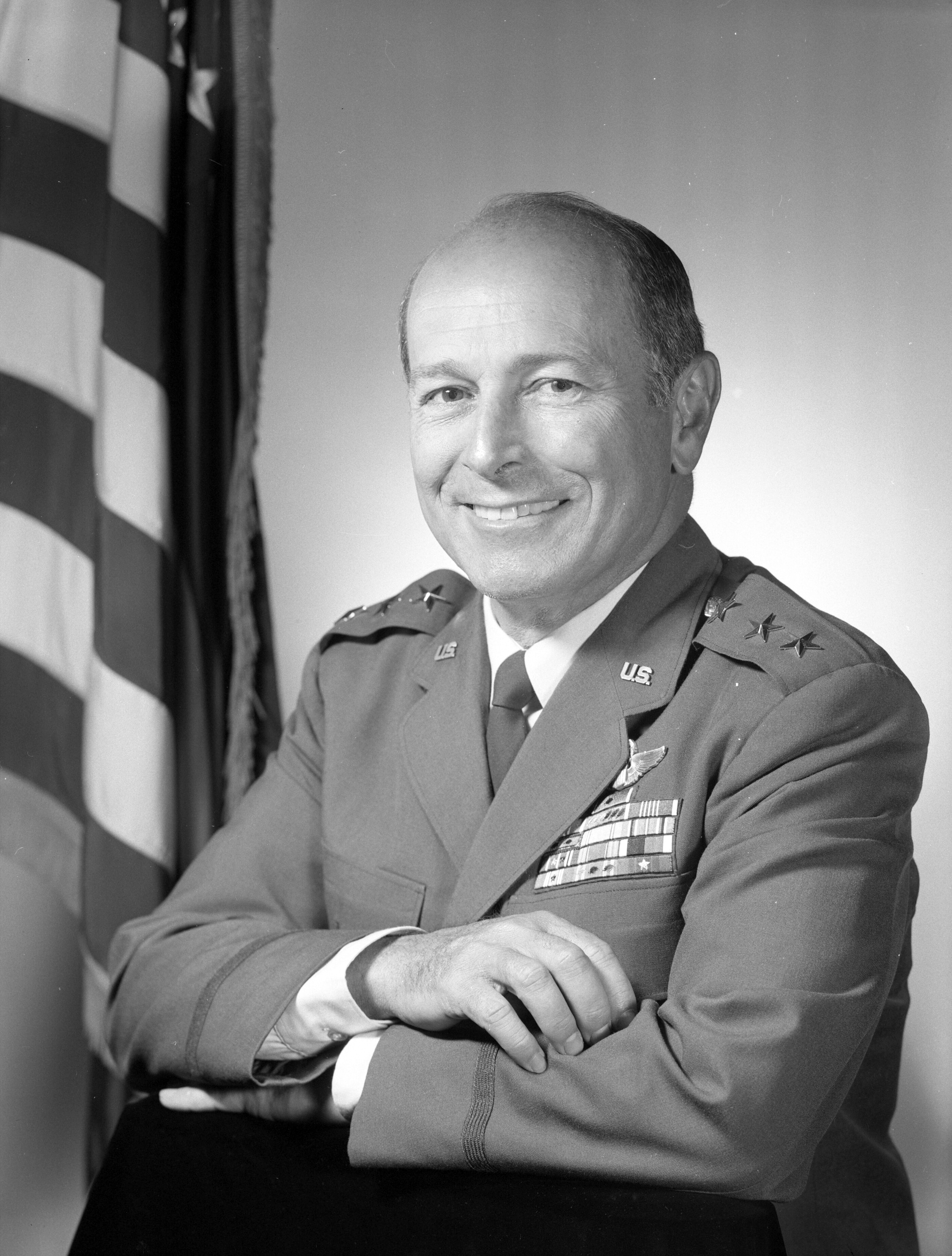
- Wilson as a lieutenant general
- Born: January 10, 1919; Huntington, West Virginia, US
- Died: June 25, 2010 (aged 91); Tucson, Arizona, US
- Burial place: USAFA Cemetery
- Military career
- Allegiance: United States
- Branch: United States Air Force
- Service years: 1938–1939, 1943–1977
- Rank: General
- Commands: 367th Fighter Squadron; 4081st Strategic Wing; Space and Missile Systems Organization; Space and Missile Test Center; United States Air Forces in Europe; Pacific Air Forces
- Conflicts: World War II; Cold War; Korean War; Vietnam War

Louis Locke Wilson Jr. (January 10, 1919 – June 25, 2010) was a four-star general in the United States Air Force (USAF) and former commander in chief of the Pacific Air Forces.

== Biography ==
=== Early life ===
Wilson was born in Huntington, West Virginia, in 1919. He graduated from high school in that town and in 1937, after which he attended Greenbrier Military School in Lewisburg, West Virginia. After a year's service in an enlisted status with the 11th Infantry, he entered the United States Military Academy at West Point in 1939, and graduated in January 1943 with a commission as second lieutenant in the United States Army Air Corps and assigned to the United States Army Air Forces (USAAF). He completed military flight training/pilot training while a cadet at the academy and received an aeronautical rating as a USAAF pilot concurrent with his graduation from West Point.

=== Early career ===
His first assignment was during World War II with a P-47 Thunderbolt unit, the 358th Fighter Group, which was deployed to England in October 1943 for bomber escort duty with the Eighth Air Force. Just prior to D-Day, the group was used for interdiction missions in preparation for the invasion of Normandy. Subsequently, the group was transferred to the Ninth Air Force and flew close air support missions for General George S. Patton's drive through France. During this period, his group was cited three times by the president for its performance. By the time the war ended, Wilson had flown 114 combat missions and had become commander of the 367th Fighter Squadron.

In January 1946, he was assigned to Second Air Force and later the Fifteenth Air Force at Colorado Springs, Colorado. In March 1946, the Second was inactivated and the Fifteenth became the first Numbered Air Force of the newly formed Strategic Air Command (SAC).

In July 1948, he began 14 years of duty with various Eighth Air Force units of SAC. From 1948 to 1953, he served with the 509th Bombardment Wing at Walker Air Force Base, New Mexico, and helped organize the 6th Bombardment Wing at Walker. During this period, he was a B-29 Superfortress and a B-36 Peacemaker squadron commander.

=== Later career ===
In June 1953, Wilson was assigned to Eighth Air Force Headquarters, Fort Worth Army Air Field, Texas, as deputy director of personnel. He was transferred in September 1955 to the 380th Bombardment Wing at Plattsburgh Air Force Base, New York, as director of operations. He returned in July 1957 to Eighth Air Force headquarters at Westover Air Force Base, Massachusetts., where he served first as director of plans and later as inspector general. In October 1960, he became commander of the 4081st Strategic Wing at Ernest Harmon Air Force Base, Newfoundland. Two years later, he was transferred to SAC headquarters at Offutt Air Force Base, Nebraska, as chief of the plans division.

In August 1964, he was assigned to Headquarters United States Air Force, Washington D.C., where he served as deputy director of operational requirements and development plans in the Office of the Deputy Chief of Staff for Research and Development. During this four-year tour of duty, he worked on conceptual plans for the B-1 Lancer, F-15 Eagle, A-10 Thunderbolt II, and advanced versions of intercontinental ballistic missiles (ICBM).

In August 1968, Wilson became vice commander of the Space and Missile Systems Organization at Los Angeles Air Force Station, California. In July 1970, he became commander of the Space and Missile Test Center (SAMTEC), Vandenberg Air Force Base, California, where he was responsible for testing ICBMs and launching various space systems.

Wilson was appointed the Inspector General of the Air Force in September 1971 for two years. He later assumed duties as vice commander in chief, United States Air Forces in Europe, with headquarters at Ramstein Air Base, West Germany, in September 1973.

In July 1974, Wilson was appointed commander in chief, Pacific Air Forces, with headquarters at Hickam Air Force Base, Hawaii. One of the lesser-known actions that he commanded during the Vietnam War was Operation Babylift, the mass evacuation of children from South Vietnam to the United States and other western countries.

=== Retirement and later life ===
He was promoted to the grade of general effective July 1, 1974, with date of rank that same day. He retired on May 31, 1977.

During retirement, he settled on a small ranch in Tucson, Arizona to raise horses and cattle.

He died on June 25, 2010. He was interred at the United States Air Force Academy Cemetery in Colorado on July 1, 2010.

== Awards ==
His military decorations and awards include the:

- Air Force Distinguished Service Medal with an oak leaf cluster
- Legion of Merit with an oak leaf cluster
- Distinguished Flying Cross
- Air Medal with eighteen oak leaf clusters
- Army Commendation Medal
- Presidential Unit Citation with two oak leaf clusters
- French Croix de Guerre
- Command pilot
- Master Missile Badge
