= 376th Air Refueling Squadron =

Inactive US Air Force unit

376th Air Refueling Squadron (later 376th Expeditionary Air Refueling Squadron)

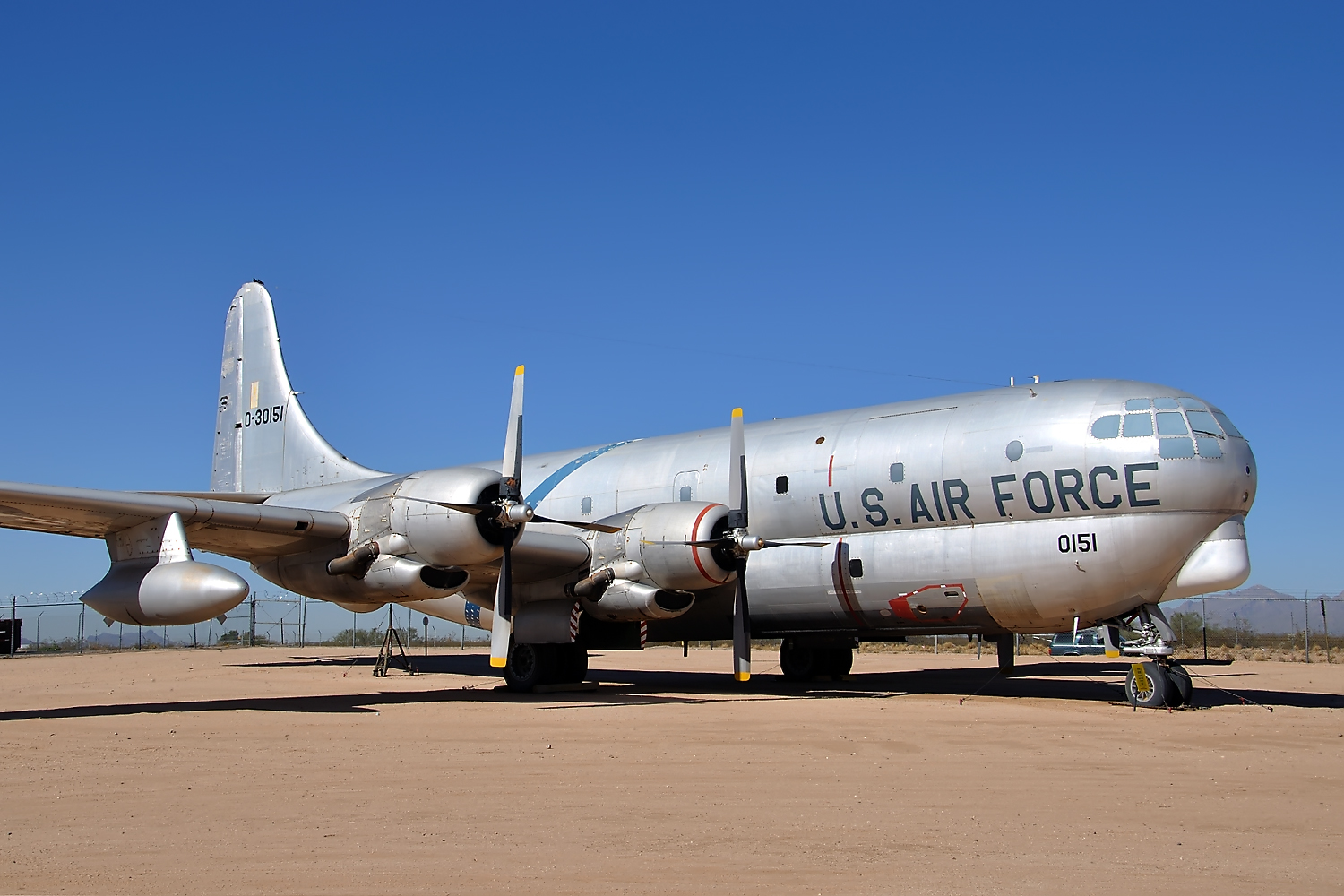
- KC-97 Stratofreighter as flown by the squadron (Note: Aircraft is Boeing KC-97G Stratofreighter, serial 53-151.)
- Active: 1943–1945; 1951–1952; 1953–1966
- Country: United States
- Branch: United States Air Force
- Role: Fighter, aerial refueling
- Engagements: European Theater of Operations

Insignia
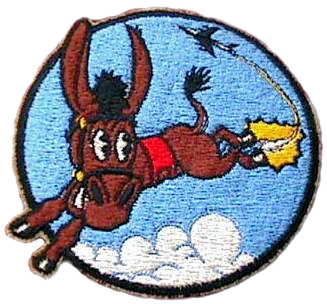
- Patch with 376th Air Refueling Squadron emblem

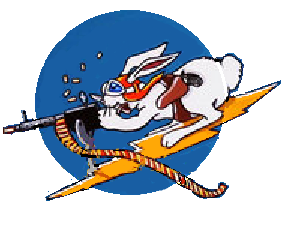
- 376th Fighter Squadron emblem (Note: Approved 17 June 1943.)
- World War II fuselage code: E9

The 376th Air Refueling Squadron is an inactive United States Air Force unit. It was last assigned to the 4081st Strategic Wing at Ernest Harmon Air Force Base, Newfoundland, where it was inactivated in June 1966.

== History ==
=== World War II ===
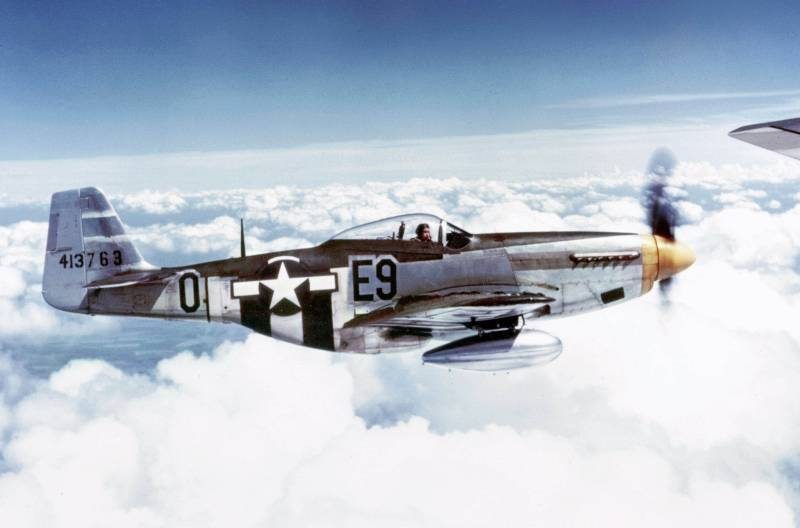
Squadron P-51 Mustang

Established in early 1943 as the 376th Fighter Squadron and equipped with Republic P-47 Thunderbolts, the squadron trained under I Fighter Command in the mid-Atlantic states. Also flew air defense missions as part of the Philadelphia Fighter Wing. Deployed to the European Theater of Operations, being assigned to VIII Fighter Command in England, November 1943.

The unit served primarily as an escort organization, covering the penetration, attack, and withdrawal of Boeing B-17 flying Fortress and Consolidated B-24 Liberator bomber formations that the United States Air Forces in Europe sent against targets on the Continent. The squadron also engaged in counter-air patrols, fighter sweeps, and strafing and dive-bombing missions. Attacked such targets as airdromes, marshalling yards, missile sites, industrial areas, ordnance depots, oil refineries, trains, and highways. During its operations, the unit participated in the assault against the Luftwaffe and aircraft industry during Big Week, 20–25 February 1944, and the attack on transportation facilities prior to the Normandy invasion and support of the invasion forces thereafter, including the Saint-Lô breakthrough in July.

The squadron supported the airborne attack on the Netherlands in September 1944 and deployed to Chievres Airdrome, (ALG A-84), Belgium between February and April 1945 flying tactical ground support missions during the airborne assault across the Rhine. The unit returned to RAF Little Walden and flew its last combat mission on 20 April 1945. Demobilized during the summer of 1945 in England, inactivated in the United States as a paper unit in October.

=== Cold War ===
The squadron flew the Boeing KC-97 Stratofreighter, first, the KC-97F, then the KC-97G. It was stationed at Barksdale Air Force Base, providing air refueling to USAF units from 1953 to 1960. In August 1960, the squadron moved to Ernest Harmon Air Force Base, Newfoundland.

=== Expeditionary unit ===
The 376th Fighter Squadron and 376th Air Refueling Squadron were consolidated into a single unit in September 1985. The consolidated squadron was converted to provisional status and redesignated the 376th Expeditionary Air Refueling Squadron in June 2002.

== Lineage ==
376th Fighter Squadron

- Constituted as the 376th Fighter Squadron, Single Engine on 28 January 1943

Activated on 10 February 1943
Inactivated on 10 November 1945

- Consolidated on 19 September 1985 with the 376th Air Refueling Squadron as the 376th Air Refueling Squadron

376th Expeditionary Air Refueling Squadron

- Constituted as the 376th Air Refueling Squadron, Medium

Activated on 1 June 1951
Inactivated on 20 May 1952
Activated on 18 August 1953
Inactivated on 25 June 1966

- Consolidated on 19 September 1985 with the 376th Fighter Squadron as the 376th Air Refueling Squadron, Heavy
- Redesignated 376th Expeditionary Air Refueling Squadron and converted to provisional status on 12 June 2002

=== Assignments ===
- 361st Fighter Group, 10 February 1943 – 10 November 1945
- 376th Bombardment Group: 1 June 1951 – 20 May 1952 (Not manned or equipped)
- 376th Bombardment Wing: 18 August 1953
- 4th Air Division: 1 December 1957 (attached to 301st Bombardment Wing)
- 4238th Strategic Wing: 1 March 1958 (remained attached to 301st Bombardment Wing until 15 April 1958)
- 4081st Strategic Wing: 1 July 1960 – 25 June 1966
- Air Mobility Command to activate or inactivate as needed, 12 June 2002
- Air Combat Command to activate or inactivate as needed, 19 March 2003

=== Stations ===
- Richmond Army Air Base, Virginia, 10 February 1943
- Camp Springs Army Air Field, Maryland, 26 May 1943
- Millville Army Air Field, New Jersey, 15 August 1943
- Camp Springs Army Air Field, Maryland, 18 September 1943
- Richmond Army Air Base, Virginia, 30 September – 11 November 1943
- RAF Bottisham (AAF-374), England, 30 November 1943
- RAF Little Walden (AAF-165), England, ca. 28 September 1944 (Operated from St-Dizier Airfield (A-64), France, after 23 December 1944)
- Chievres Airfield (A-84), Belgium, 1 February 1945
- RAF Little Walden (AAF-165), England, 7 April – c. 11 October 1945
- Camp Kilmer, New Jersey, 23–24 October 1945
- Barksdale Air Force Base, Louisiana 1 June 1951 – 20 May 1952
- Barksdale Air Force Base, Louisiana, 18 August 1953
- Ernest Harmon Air Force Base, Newfoundland, Canada, 15 August 1960 – 25 June 1966

=== Aircraft ===
- Republic P-47 Thunderbolt, 1943–1944
- North American P-51D Mustang, 1944–1945
- Boeing KC-97 Stratotanker 1953–1966
