= 376th Division =

376th Division may refer to:

- 376th Infantry Division, Wehrmacht, Germany
- 376th Rifle Division, Soviet Union

== See also ==
- List of military divisions by number
- 376th (disambiguation)
