= 514th Flight Test Squadron =

514th Flight Test Squadron

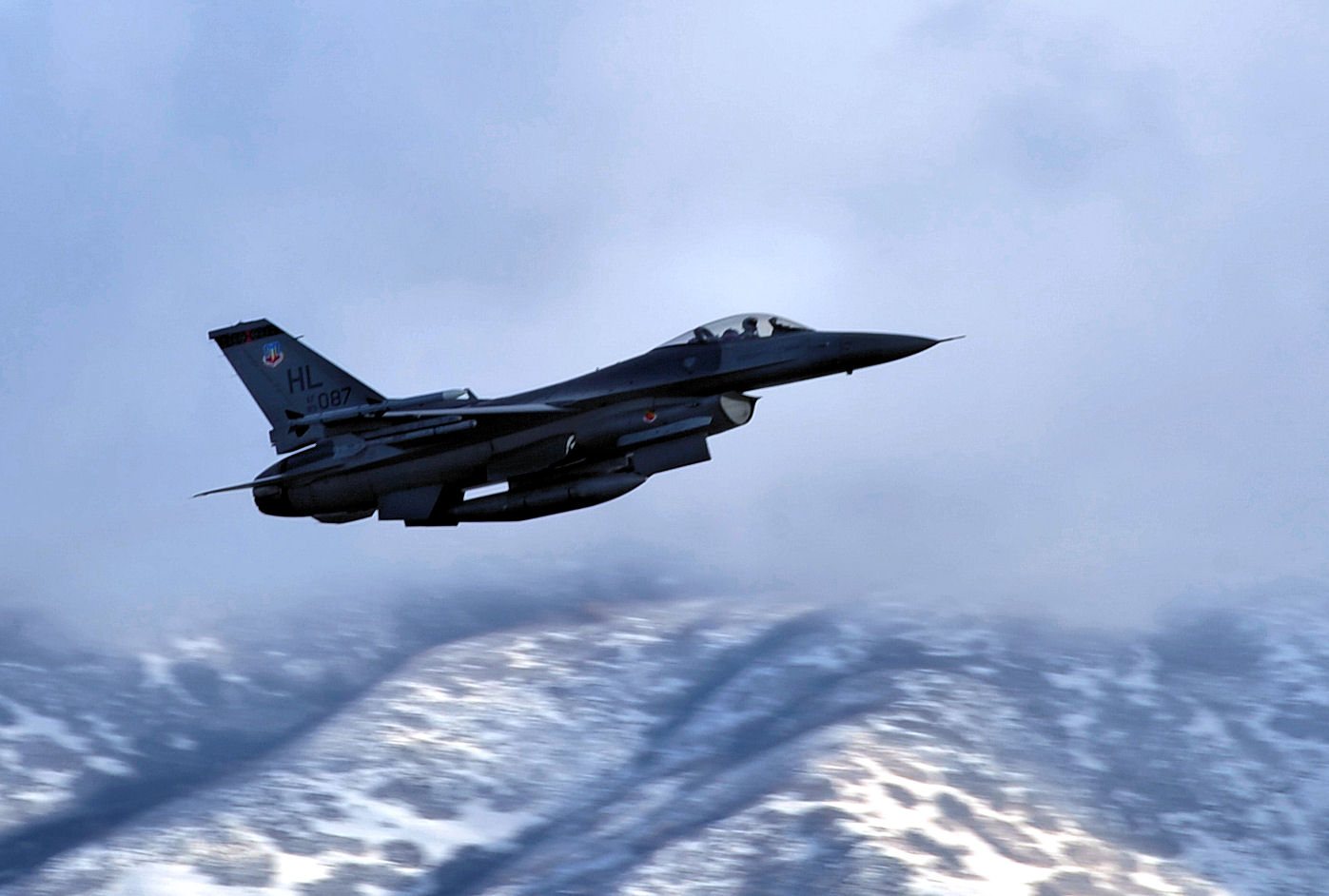
- A 514th Flight Test Squadron F-16 Fighting Falcon takes off from Hill Air Force Base 15 December 2010
- Active: 1942–1946; 1947–1951; 1951–1965; 1970–present
- Country: United States
- Branch: United States Air Force
- Role: Flight testing
- Part of: Air Force Materiel Command
- Garrison/HQ: Hill Air Force Base, Utah
- Mottos: Quaerite Optimum (Latin for 'Seek the Optimum'); Go, We Pave the Way (1957–1965)
- Engagements: Mediterranean Theater of Operations; Korean War
- Decorations: Distinguished Unit Citation; Air Force Outstanding Unit Award

Insignia
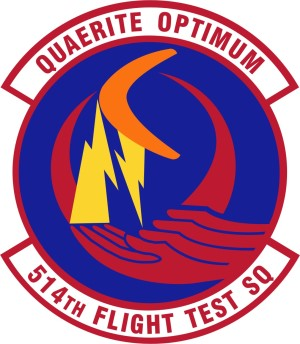
- 514th Flight Test Squadron emblem (Note: Approved 18 April 1990.)

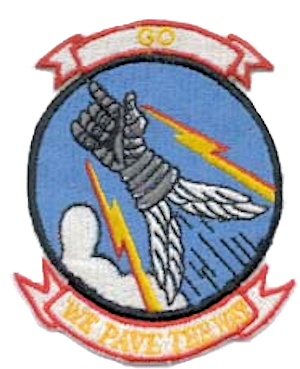
- Patch with 514th Bombardment Squadron emblem (Note: Approved 26 March 1957. Description: On a disc sky blue, bordered black, over a white cloud formation issuing from base, a white winged mailed gauntlet, steel gray with dark gray outlines and shadows throughout; the hand pointing the way skyward and speeding upward across the sky blue disc, leaving speed lines in its wake, supported by two golden yellow bolts of lightning, shaded red, pointing the way)

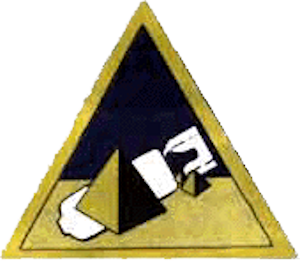
- 514th Bombardment Squadron emblem (World War II)

Aircraft flown
- Fighter: F-16 Fighting Falcon
- Transport: C-130 Hercules

The 514th Flight Test Squadron is a squadron of the United States Air Force, which has been stationed at Hill Air Force Base, Utah since 1973, performing functional flight checks on aircraft undergoing major maintenance.

The first predecessor of the squadron was formed as the 514th Bombardment Squadron in the Middle East in 1942 to reinforce the Royal Air Force in North Africa with personnel and aircraft diverted from delivery to the China Burma India Theater. The squadron moved forward, eventually being stationed in Italy, where it participated in the strategic bombing campaign against Germany, and was awarded three Distinguished Unit Citations for its combat actions. Following V-E Day, the squadron returned to the United States, where it converted to Boeing B-29 Superfortress bombers, but was inactivated in March 1946.

The squadron was redesignated the 514th Reconnaissance Squadron and activated in 1947 as a weather reconnaissance unit. It continued the reconnaissance mission until February 1951, when it was inactivated and its assets transferred to another squadron. The squadron returned to the bombardment mission later that year, and upgraded to jet Boeing B-47 Stratojet bombers in 1954. It continued to fly the Stratojet until they were phased out of the Air Force inventory, and the squadron was inactivated in 1965.

The squadron's second predecessor was organized as the 6514th Test Squadron at Edwards Air Force Base in 1970 to test unmanned aerial vehicles. It moved to Hill in 1973 and assumed its current mission. The two squadrons were consolidated in 1992 as the 514th Test Squadron

== Mission ==
The 514th's current mission is to accomplish high-risk acceptance flights on F-16 Fighting Falcon, A-10 Thunderbolt II and C-130 Hercules aircraft following depot level maintenance. its aircrews provide the final quality control checks to ensure aircraft are airworthy and capable of returning to combat units. As the OO-ALC Center Test Authority, the squadron is the focal point for managing and providing test process expertise and support for all test and evaluation at the Ogden Air Logistics Complex.

== History ==
=== World War II ===
==== Background ====
In early 1942, the Afrika Korps was threatening British forces in Egypt. In response, two contingents of American heavy bombers were diverted to support them. A flight of Consolidated B-24 Liberators being ferried to India was halted from its travel in June and some Boeing B-17 Flying Fortresses from the 9th and 436th Bombardment Squadrons were flown to the Middle East from India. On 20 July 1942, these elements were organized into the 1st Provisional Group at RAF Lydda, Palestine.

==== North African operations ====
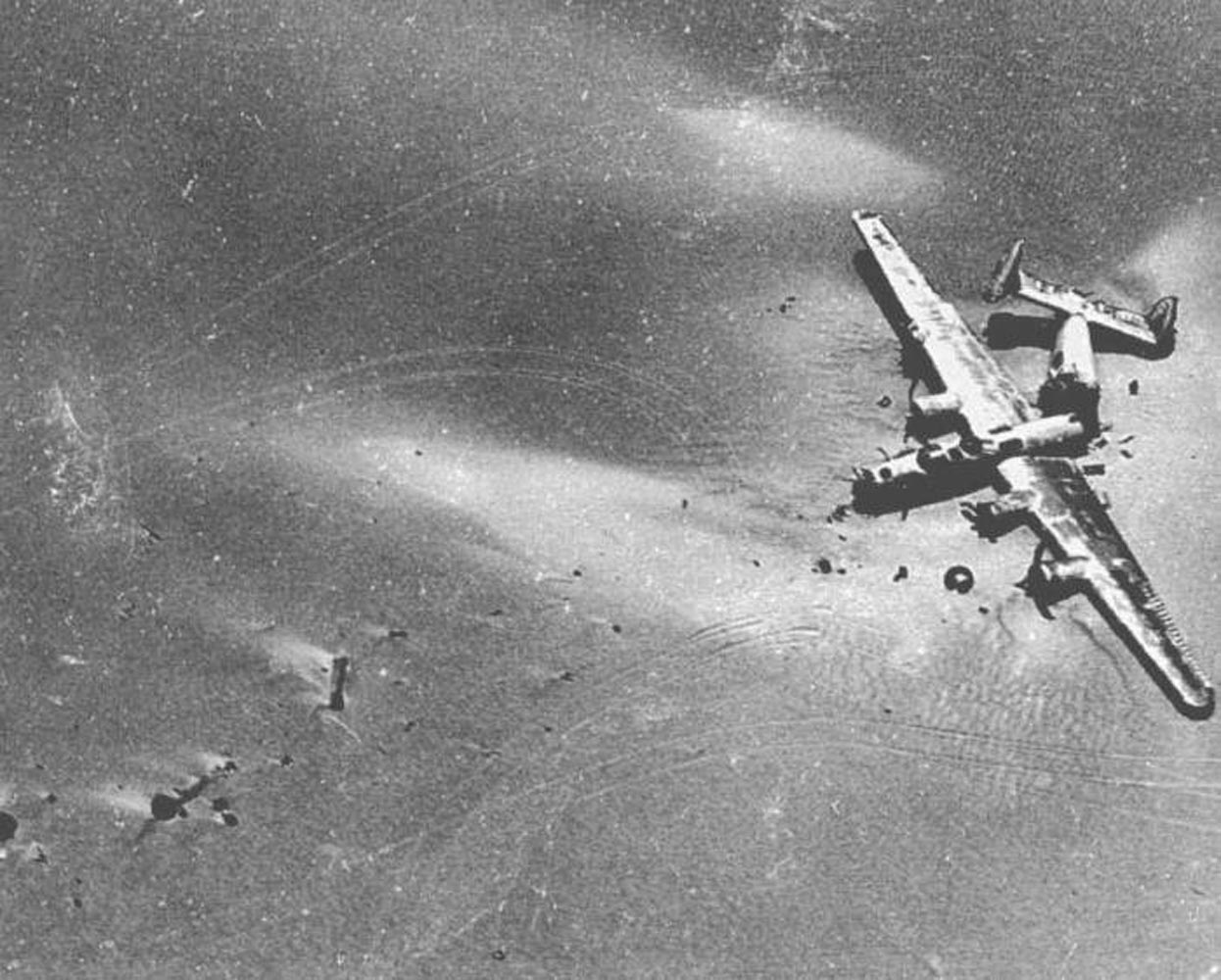
Wreckage of squadron Consolidated B-24D-25-CO Lady be Good in the Libyan desert

On 31 October 1942, the 1st Group was dissolved and replaced by a formal Army Air Forces unit, the 376th Bombardment Group. The 514th Bombardment Squadron was activated as one of its four component squadrons. The squadron was originally equipped with a mix of Liberators and Flying Fortresses, but by the end of the year, the B-17s were transferred to Twelfth Air Force and the squadron became an all B-24 unit.

Moving forward to bases in Egypt and Libya, the squadron attacked shipping in the Mediterranean and harbor installations in Libya, Tunisia, Sicily, and Italy to cut enemy supply lines to North Africa. After the fall of Tunisia in May 1943, the squadron focused on attacks on aerodromes, marshalling yards, and other objectives in Sicily and Italy, moving forward to Enfidaville Airfield, Tunisia in late September. Its actions during these attacks on enemy targets from its activation through August 1943 earned the squadron its first Distinguished Unit Citation (DUC).

On 1 August 1943, operating from Benina Airport, Libya, the squadron participated in Operation Tidal Wave, the low level attack on oil refineries near Ploesti, with the squadron's parent group leading the attack formation. As it approached its assigned targets, the lead aircraft realized that an order from the group commander, who had misidentified the initial point, put the group off course. The group attempted an attack on the Romana Americana refinery, its assigned objective from a different direction. By this time, enemy air defenses had been alerted and intense flak forced the unit to attack targets of opportunity. The squadron was awarded its second DUC for this operation.

==== Strategic bombing campaign ====
The squadron moved to San Pancrazio Airfield, Italy in November 1943, where it became part of Fifteenth Air Force and would remain until April 1945. It primarily flew long range strategic bombardment missions to targets in Italy, France, Germany, Czechoslovakia, Austria, Hungary, and the Balkans to bomb factories, marshalling yards, oil refineries, oil storage facilities, airdromes, bridges, harbors, and other objectives. On 16 June 1944, it received a third DUC for an attack on oil industry targets in Bratislava. The squadron also provided air support for Operation Shingle, the landings at Anzio and flew interdiction missions to support the Battle of Monte Cassino between February and March 1944. In the fall of 1944, it assisted the Red Army in its advance through the Balkans, and in early 1945, supported Operation Grapeshot, the spring offensive in Northern Italy. The squadron was withdrawn from combat in April 1945 and left Italy for the United States.

The squadron arrived at Harvard Army Air Field, Nebraska in May 1945 and began conversion to the Boeing B-29 Superfortress. However the war in the Pacific ended before the squadron was fully trained. After it moved to March Field, California on 1 November, the squadron was not fully manned or equipped. It was inactivated on 7 March 1946, and most of its few resources at MacDill Air Force Base, Florida were absorbed by other elements of the 498th Bombardment Group.

=== Weather reconnaissance ===
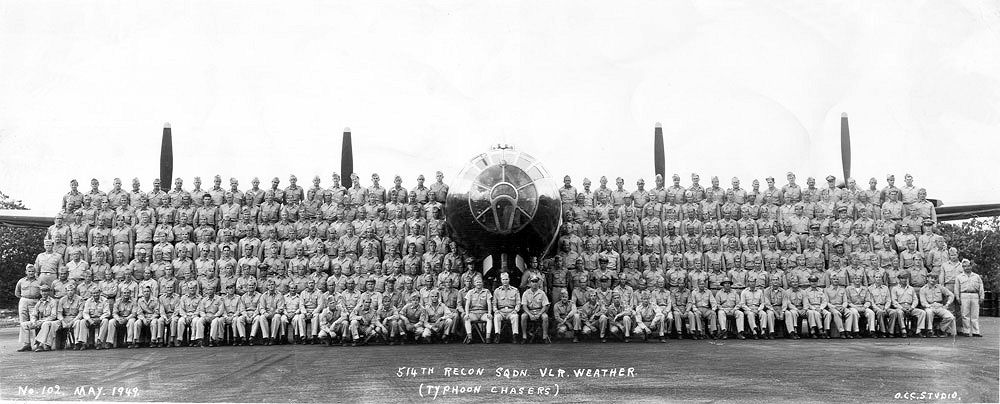
The 514th Reconnaissance Squadron (VLR) Weather taken in May 1949

The squadron was redesignated the 514th Reconnaissance Squadron and activated at North Field, Guam, where it assumed the personnel and equipment of the 54th Reconnaissance Squadron, which was simultaneously inactivated. The squadron performed weather reconnaissance missions in the Pacific. After the onset of the Korean War these missions included combat support. In September 1950, a squadron crew, flying a WB-29 continued a typhoon reconnaissance mission despite the loss of one engine. The information concerning this typhoon was vital for operations in Japan preparing for the Inchon Landing. In February 1951, the squadron inactivated and transferred its mission, personnel and equipment to the 54th Strategic Reconnaissance Squadron.

=== Strategic Air Command ===
EB-47E Stratojet in 376th Wing markings

The squadron was redesignated the 514th Bombardment Squadron and reactivated at Forbes Air Force Base, Kansas in June 1951. The squadron was again equipped with Superfortress bombers and assigned to the 376th Group. It began training in strategic bombardment in August. However, SAC's mobilization for the Korean War highlighted that SAC wing commanders focused too much on running the base organization and did not spend enough time on overseeing actual combat preparations. To allow wing commanders the ability to focus on combat operations, SAC air base group commanders became responsible for managing the base housekeeping functions. Under the plan implemented in February 1951 and finalized in June 1952, the wing commander focused primarily on the combat units and the maintenance necessary to support combat aircraft by having the combat and maintenance squadrons report directly to the wing and eliminating the intermediate group structures. As a result of this "dual deputy" reorganization, the 376th Group was inactivated and the squadron was assigned directly to the 376th Bombardment Wing in June 1952.

The squadron moved to Barksdale Air Force Base, Louisiana in October. By November 1952, electronic countermeasures (ECM) training began to predominate over bombardment, and by September 1953, ECM had become the unit's primary mission. In 1954, the squadron converted to Boeing B-47 Stratojet jet medium bombers. It moved again in 1957, this time to Lockbourne Air Force Base, Ohio. After 1958, Strategic Air Command (SAC) B-47 units began to assume an alert posture at their home base.

During the 1962 Cuban Missile Crisis, SAC dispersed its B-47s on 22 October. Most dispersal bases were civilian airfields with Reserve or Air National Guard units. B-47s were configured for execution of the Emergency War Order as soon as possible after dispersal. On 24 October SAC went to DEFCON 2, placing all aircraft on alert. On 15 November 1/6 of the dispersed B-47s were recalled to their home bases. The remaining dispersed B-47s and supporting tankers were recalled on 24 November. On 27 November SAC returned to normal alert posture. The squadron continued to train in electronic warfare techniques until beginning to phase down for inactivation in March 1965 with the retirement of the Stratojet from SAC's inventory.

=== Flight testing ===
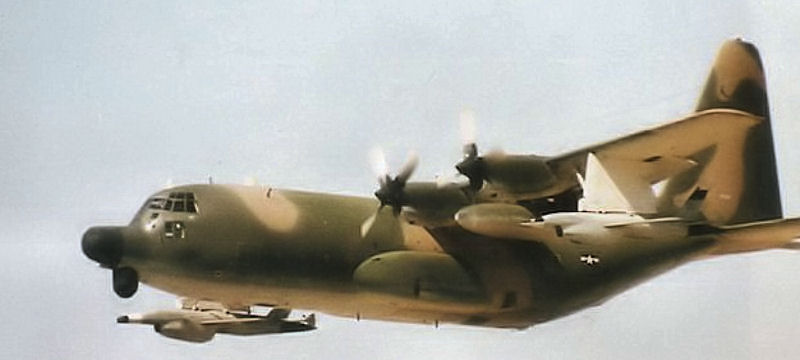
DC-130 launching AQM-34 Firebee drone

The 6514th Test Squadron was activated in May 1970 at Edwards Air Force Base, California, where it was assigned to the 6512th Test Group. Its mission was to support flight testing and modifications of the Ryan AQM-34 Firebee reconnaissance drone, being used in the Vietnam War by the 556th Reconnaissance Squadron to gather intelligence over strongly defended areas over North Vietnam. The squadron moved to Hill Air Force Base, Utah in 1973 and became a component of the Air Force Flight Test Center.

At Hill, the squadron continued conducting and supporting the Firebee as well as other remotely piloted vehicles, unmanned aerial vehicles, and cruise missile test missions, and supported various test operations at the Utah Test and Training Range. From the late 1970s, the 6514th operated a Lockheed DC-130H Hercules (later NC-130H) drone launch control airplane along with an HC-130H. It added two C-130B (later, NC-130B) and a DC-130A in the 1980s. The squadron also used a few Sikorsky HH-53C and Sikorsky CH-3E helicopters to retrieve drones and missiles and transport people to and from remote sites on the range. By the mid-1980s, the heavy helicopters gave way to Bell HH-1H Huey helicopters.

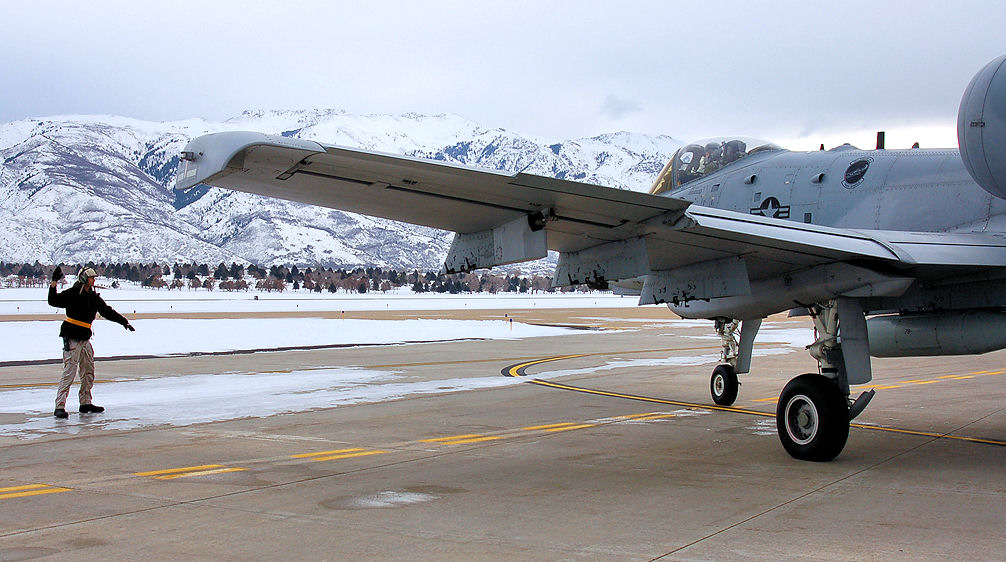
A groundcrew member guides an A-10C to the Hill AFB runway

The 6514th was consolidated with the 514th as the 514th Test Squadron in October 1992. It absorbed the 15th Test Squadron mission in 1993 and began depot flight testing C-130, Fairchild Republic A-10 Thunderbolt II and General Dynamics F-16 Fighting Falcon aircraft. It ended its drone and range mission and realigned under Ogden Air Logistics Center on 30 September 1995.

Currently, the 514th quality-control checks involve performing flight checks, which means flying planes that have usually been stripped to the bone and put back together again. The standard check flight for an F-16 can take up to an hour, while the A-10 and C-130 flights can last for an hour and a half. In addition, the 514th provides delivery of foreign military sales aircraft all over the world, from Thailand to Italy. Many of those aircraft come from the Aerospace Maintenance and Regeneration Center, or "bone yard," at Davis–Monthan Air Force Base, Arizona, and the 514th sends pilots there to test them once they have been reassembled and put back into flying condition. In 2003, the military reserve force assumed the flight check mission, and the squadron was reassigned to Air Force Reserve Command's 413th Flight Test Group.

== Lineage ==
514th Bombardment Squadron

- Constituted as the 514th Bombardment Squadron (Heavy) on 19 October 1942

Activated on 31 October 1942
Redesignated 514th Bombardment Squadron, Heavy on 3 May 1944
Redesignated 514th Bombardment Squadron, Very Heavy on 23 May 1945
Inactivated on 7 March 1946
Redesignated 514th Reconnaissance Squadron, Very Long Range, Weather on 16 September 1947
Activated on 15 October 1947
Inactivated on 20 February 1951
Redesignated 514th Bombardment Squadron, Medium on 25 May 1951
Activated on 1 June 1951
Inactivated on 15 March 1965
Consolidated with the 6514th Test Squadron on 1 October 1992

514th Flight Test Squadron
Designated as the 6514th Test Squadron and activated on 15 May 1970
Consolidated with the 514th Bombardment Squadron on 1 October 1992
Redesignated 514th Test Squadron on 2 October 1992
Redesignated 514th Flight Test Squadron on 1 March 1994

=== Assignments ===
- 376th Bombardment Group, 31 October 1942
- 498th Bombardment Group, 10 November 1945 – 7 March 1946
- 43d Weather Wing, 15 October 1947 (Note: This was a table of organization unit, organized in September 1945 and inactivated on 3 June 1948. It was replaced by a table of distribution wing organized on 1 June 1948. In October 1948 the table of distribution wing was renumbered to conform with Air Force policy that such units (later called MAJCON units) be numbered in 4-digit series allotted to the Major Commands.)
- 43d Weather Wing (later 2143d Air Weather Wing), 1 June 1948 – 20 February 1951
- 376th Bombardment Group, 1 June 1951 (attached to 376th Bombardment Wing)
- 376th Bombardment Wing, 16 June 1952 – 15 March 1965
- 6512th Test Group (later 6510th Test Wing), 15 May 1970
- Air Force Flight Test Center, 1 January 1973
- 6510th Test Wing, 1 March 1978
- 6545th Test Group (later 545th Test Group), 1 January 1979
- Ogden Air Logistics Center, 30 September 1995 (Note: Although prepared in 2008, the factsheet omits the reassignment to the 413th Group in 2003.)
- 413th Flight Test Group, 1 October 2003 – present

=== Stations ===
- RAF Lydda, Palestine, 31 October 1942
- RAF Abu Sueir, Egypt, 8 November 1942
- RAF Gambut, Libya, 10 February 1943
- Soluch Airfield, Libya, 25 February 1943
- Benina Airport, Libya, 16 April 1943
- Enfidaville Airfield, Tunisia, c. 26 September 1943 (detachment operated from Benina Airport, Libya, 3–11 October 1943)
- San Pancrazio Airfield, Italy, 19 November 1943 – 19 April 1945
- Harvard Army Air Field, Nebraska, 8 May 1945
- Grand Island Army Air Field, Nebraska, 25 June 1945
- March Field, California, 10 November 1945
- MacDill Field, Florida, 22 December 1945 – 7 March 1946
- North Field, Guam (by 1949, Andersen Air Force Base), 15 October 1947 – 20 February 1951
- Forbes Air Force Base, Kansas, 1 June 1951
- Barksdale Air Force Base, Louisiana, 10 October 1951
- Lockbourne Air Force Base, Ohio, 1 December 1957 – 15 March 1965
- Edwards Air Force Base, California, 15 May 1970
- Hill Air Force Base, Utah, 18 September 1973 – present

=== Aircraft ===
- Boeing B-17 Flying Fortress, 1942
- Consolidated B-24 Liberator, 1942–1945
- B-29 Superfortress, 1945, 1947–1951, 1951–1954
- TB-29 Superfortress, 1947–1951
- RB-29 Superfortress, 1947–1951
- WB-29 Superfortress, 1947–1951
- Douglas C-54 Skymaster, 1948–1951
- Douglas C-47 Skytrain, 1949–1950
- Boeing B-47 Stratojet, 1954–1961
- E-47 (later EB-47 Stratojet), 1961–1965
- Ryan AQM-34Q Firebee, 1970–1995
- Lockheed DC-130 Hercules, 1970–1995
- Lockheed NC-130H Hercules, 1970–1995
- BGM-109G Ground Launched Cruise Missile, 1979–1990
- HH-53C MARS (Mid-Air Retrieval System), ? until 1988 <Major Alan D Resnicke, USAF, Retired>
- HH-1H, 1987 until ? <Major Alan D Resnicke, USAF, Retired>
- Fairchild Republic A-10 Thunderbolt II, 1993–present
- Lockheed C-130 Hercules, 1993–present
- General Dynamics F-16 Fighting Falcon, 1993–present

=== Awards and campaigns ===
Award streamer	Award	Dates	Notes
	Distinguished Unit Citation	November 1942-17 August 1943	North Africa and Sicily, 514th Bombardment Squadron
	Distinguished Unit Citation	1 August 1943	Ploesti, Romania, 514th Bombardment Squadron
	Distinguished Unit Citation	16 June 1944	Bratislava, Czechoslovakia, 514th Bombardment Squadron
	Air Force Outstanding Unit Award	15 May 1970-14 January 1971	6514th Test Squadron
	Air Force Outstanding Unit Award	1 July 1973-30 June 1975	6514th Test Squadron
	Air Force Outstanding Unit Award	1 July 1975-31 December 1976	6514th Test Squadron
	Air Force Outstanding Unit Award	1 January 1979-31 December 1980	6514th Test Squadron
	Air Force Outstanding Unit Award	1 January 1982-31 December 1983	6514th Test Squadron
	Air Force Outstanding Unit Award	1 January 1984-31 December 1984	6514th Test Squadron
	Air Force Outstanding Unit Award	1 January 1985-31 December 1986	6514th Test Squadron
	Air Force Outstanding Unit Award	1 January 1993-31 December 1994	514th Test Squadron (later 514th Flight Test Squadron)
	Air Force Outstanding Unit Award	1 January 1996-31 December 1996	514th Flight Test Squadron
	Air Force Outstanding Unit Award	1 October 2003–30 September 2005	514th Flight Test Squadron
	Air Force Outstanding Unit Award	1 January 2013–31 December 2014	514th Flight Test Squadron

Campaign Streamer	Campaign	Dates	Notes
	Air Offensive, Europe	31 October 1942 – 5 June 1944	514th Bombardment Squadron
	Air Combat, EAME Theater	31 October 1942 – 11 May 1945	514th Bombardment Squadron
	Egypt-Libya	31 October 1942 – 12 February 1943	514th Bombardment Squadron
	Tunisia	12 November 1942 – 13 May 1943	514th Bombardment Squadron
	Sicily	14 May 1943 – 17 August 1943	514th Bombardment Squadron
	Naples-Foggia	18 August 1943 – 21 January 1944	514th Bombardment Squadron
	Anzio	22 January 1944 – 24 May 1944	514th Bombardment Squadron
	Rome-Arno	22 January 1944 – 9 September 1944	514th Bombardment Squadron
	Central Europe	22 March 1944 – 18 April 1945	514th Bombardment Squadron
	Normandy	6 June 1944 – 24 July 1944	514th Bombardment Squadron
	Northern France	25 July 1944 – 14 September 1944	514th Bombardment Squadron
	Southern France	15 August 1944 – 14 September 1944	514th Bombardment Squadron
	North Apennines	10 September 1944 – 4 April 1945	514th Bombardment Squadron
	Rhineland	15 September 1944 – 21 March 1945	514th Bombardment Squadron
	Po Valley	3 April 1945 – 18 April 1945	514th Bombardment Squadron
	Korean Service without inscription	27 June 1950 – 20 February 1951	514th Reconnaissance Squadron

== See also ==
- B-24 Liberator units of the United States Army Air Forces
- Boeing B-17 Flying Fortress Units of the Mediterranean Theater of Operations
- General Dynamics F-16 Fighting Falcon operators
- Lady Be Good
- List of B-29 Superfortress operators
- List of B-47 units of the United States Air Force
- List of Douglas C-47 Skytrain operators
- List of Lockheed C-130 Hercules operators
- List of United States Air Force test squadrons
