= 45th Air Division =

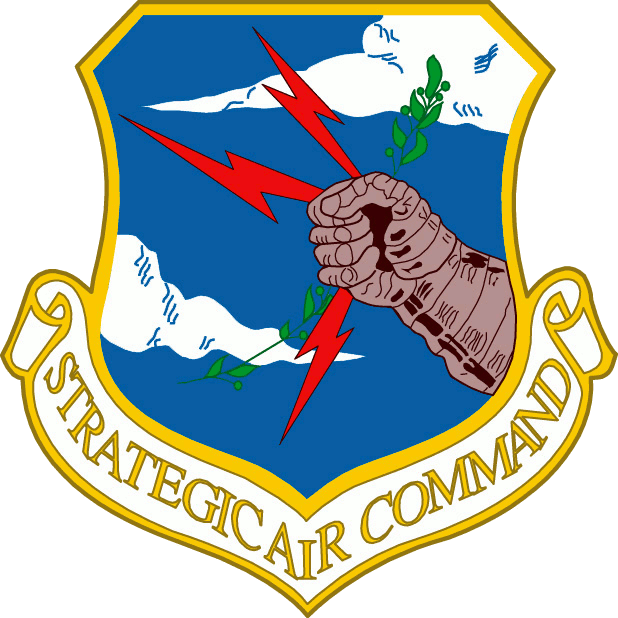
45th Air Division

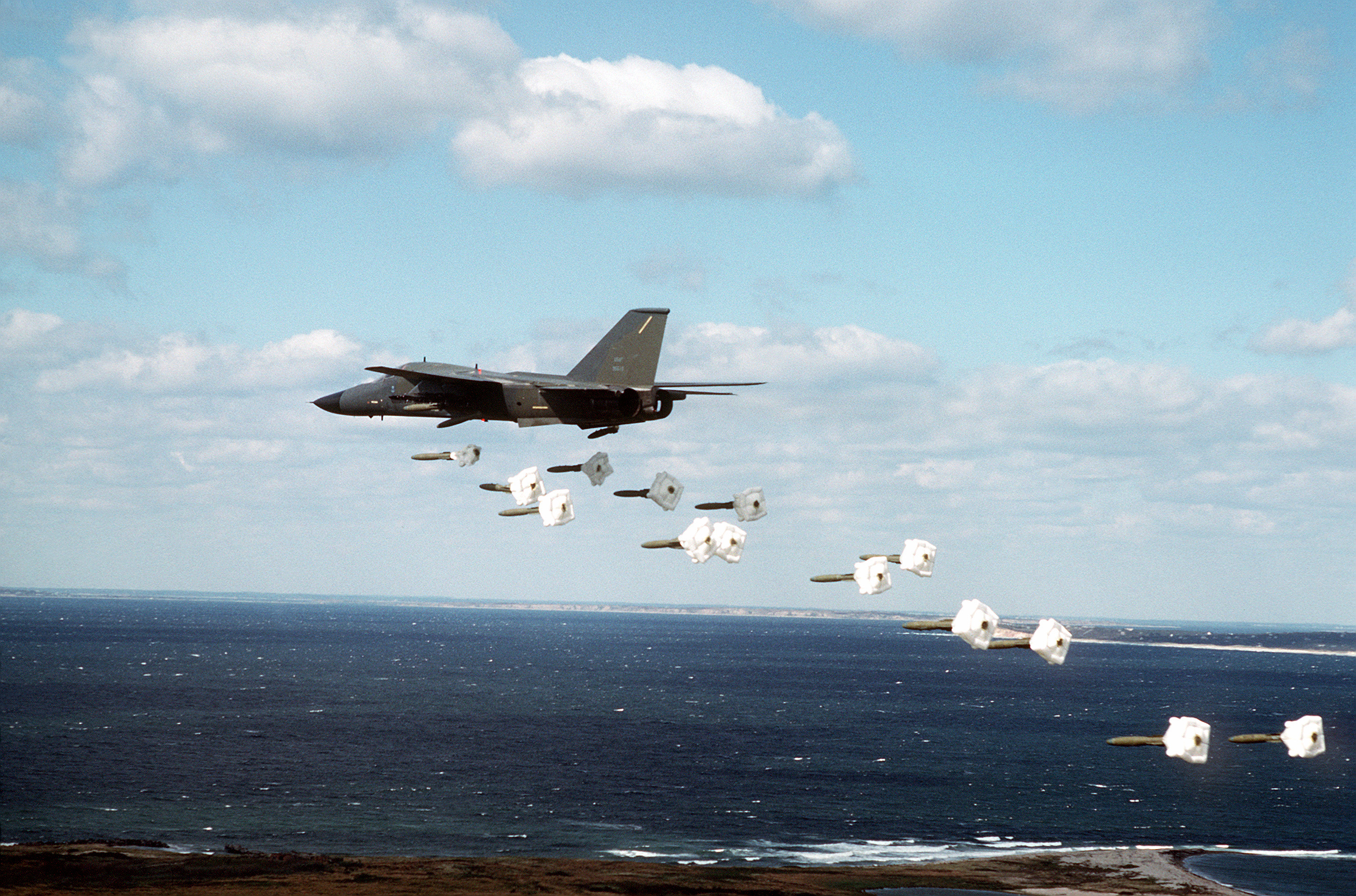
- A 509th Bombardment Wing FB-111A dropping Mark 82 high drag practice bombs
- Active: 1943–1945; 1954–1958; 1958–1989
- Country: United States
- Branch: United States Air Force
- Role: Command of strategic strike forces
- Part of: Strategic Air Command
- Engagements: European Theater of World War II

Commanders
- Notable commanders: Gen Archie J. Old Jr., Gen John C. Meyer

Insignia
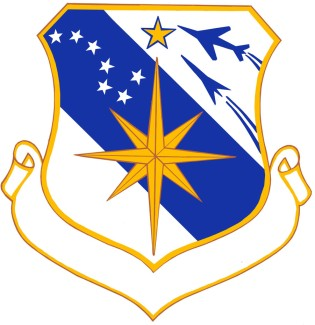
- 45th Air Division emblem (Approved 12 May 1960)

The 45th Air Division is an inactive United States Air Force unit. Its last assignment was with Eighth Air Force at Pease Air Force Base, New Hampshire. It was inactivated on 14 June 1989.

== History ==
As the 45th Bombardment Wing, the unit was one of the primary Boeing B-17 Flying Fortress heavy strategic bombardment wings of the Eighth Air Force 3d Bombardment Division in World War II. Groups from "the wing began bombing operations against German occupied Europe on 14 September 1943. Its bombers attacked targets in such German cities as Bremen, Emden, Kiel, Ludwigshafen, Munster, Saarbrücken, Schweinfurt, and Wilhelmshaven. In June 1944 the 45th supported the Allied invasion of Normandy, France, with tactical missions, against enemy airdromes, airfields, bridges, coastal defenses, field batteries, gun positions, and railway junctions."

On 21 June 1944, Colonel Archie J. Old Jr., commanding officer of the 45th Combat Bombardment Wing, served as the task force commander of a shuttle bombing mission to the Soviet Union. The task force raided a synthetic oil plant just south of Berlin, and then proceeded to Poltava, Ukraine, in the Soviet Union, where a large number of the 45th's bombers were destroyed on the ground during a raid by German bomber and fighter aircraft. About eighty German aircraft combined in one of history's most effective bombing raids, lasting over two hours. Heinkel He 111Hs began with level bombardment, followed by low-altitude strafing by Ju 88s. He 177As provided before-and-after reconnaissance. According to the internal history: "43 Fortresses were destroyed or damaged beyond repair; 3 C-47s and 1 F-5 were likewise destroyed. 26 Fortresses, 2 C-47s and 1 C-46, and 25 Russian aircraft (mainly Yak fighters) were heavily damaged but repairable; over 450,000 gallons of gasoline were destroyed and over 500 gallons of aircraft oil; over 3200 bombs, 26,000 bomb fuses, and 1,360,000 cartridges were destroyed." 25 Russians were killed on the night of the raid, but anti-personnel bomblets continued to go off for weeks after the attack, causing continuing casualties.

The surviving bombers bombed "an oil plant at Drohobycz, Poland, while returning from Poltava to Foggia, Italy. Shortly before the German surrender, in late April 1945, the wing flew five 'Chow Hound' mercy missions, dropping food and other supplies to the people in [the still occupied western part of the Netherlands]. After the German surrender on 8 May 1945, it helped transport displaced Europeans back to their respective native countries."

Reactivated an intermediate command echelon of Strategic Air Command in October 1954, the 45th Air Division "assumed responsibility for the training and combat readiness of its assigned units. It achieved this goal through staff assistance visits and supervising or participating in exercises such as Golden Hour Tango, Rubber Ball, and Sky Shield."

The 42nd, 380th, and 509th Bombardment Wings were the last wings assigned to the division, which were reassigned elsewhere in March 1989. The division was inactivated in June 1989 due to budget constraints and the reduction of forces after the end of the Cold War.

== Lineage ==
- Established as the 45th Bombardment Wing (Medium) on 15 February 1943

Activated on 1 April 1943
Redesignated: 45th Bombardment Wing (Heavy) on 6 April 1943
Redesignated: 45th Combat Bombardment Wing (Heavy) on 30 August 1943
Redesignated: 45th Combat Bombardment Wing, Heavy on 24 August 1944
Disbanded on 18 June 1945

- Reestablished and redesignated 45th Air Division on 24 September 1954

Activated on 8 October 1954
Inactivated on 18 January 1958

- Activated on 20 November 1958

Inactivated on 15 June 1989

=== Assignments ===
- Third Air Force, 1 April 1943-c. 5 August 1943
- Eighth Air Force, c. 25 August 1943
- 3d Bombardment Division, (by 18 August 1944)-18 June 1945
- Eighth Air Force, 8 October 1954 – 18 January 1958; 20 November 1958
- Second Air Force, 31 March 1970
- Eighth Air Force, 1 January 1975 – 15 June 1989

=== Components ===
Wings

- 17th Bombardment Wing: 2 July 1969 – 30 June 1971
- 42d Bombardment Wing: 8 October 1954 – 18 January 1958; l December 1958 – 29 March 1989
- 95th Strategic Wing: 2 October 1966 – 30 September 1976
- 99th Bombardment Wing: 30 June 1971 – 31 March 1974
- 380th Strategic Aerospace Wing (later 380th Bombardment Wing): 1 July 1968 – 2 July 1969; 30 June 1971 – 29 March 1989
- 416th Bombardment Wing: 2 July 1969 – 30 June 1971; 1 July 1973 – 1 December 1982
- 509th Bombardment Wing: 30 June 1971 – 9 March 1989
- 702d Strategic Missile Wing: 1 January 1959 – 25 June 1961
- 4081st Strategic Wing: 1 January 1959 – 25 June 1966
- 4082d Strategic Wing: 1 January 1959 – 2 October 1966

Groups

- 34th Bombardment Group, 24 May-18 June 1945
- 96th Bombardment Group, 13 September 1943 – 11 December 1945
- 388th Bombardment Group, 8 January 1944 – 5 August 1945
- 452d Bombardment Group, 8 January 1944 – 5 August 1945

=== Stations ===
- MacDill Field, Florida, 1 April – 4 August 1943
- Brampton Grange (AAF-102), England, c. 25 August 1943
- RAF Snetterton Heath (AAF-138), England, 13 September 1943 – 18 June 1945
- Loring Air Force Base, Maine, 8 October 1954 – 18 January 1958; 20 November 1958
- Pease Air Force Base, New Hampshire, 30 June 1971 – 15 June 1989

=== Aircraft and Missiles ===
- Boeing B-17 Flying Fortress, 1943 – 1945
- Convair B-36 Peacemaker, 1954 – 1956
- Boeing KC-97 Stratofreighter, 1955 – 1957
- Boeing B-52 Stratofortress, 1956 – 1989
- Boeing KC-135 Stratotanker, 1957 – 1989
- Snark (SM-62), 1959 – 1961
- General Dynamics FB-111A Aardvark, 1971 – 1989

== See also ==
- List of United States Air Force air divisions
