= 376th Air Expeditionary Wing =

Inactive US Air Force unit

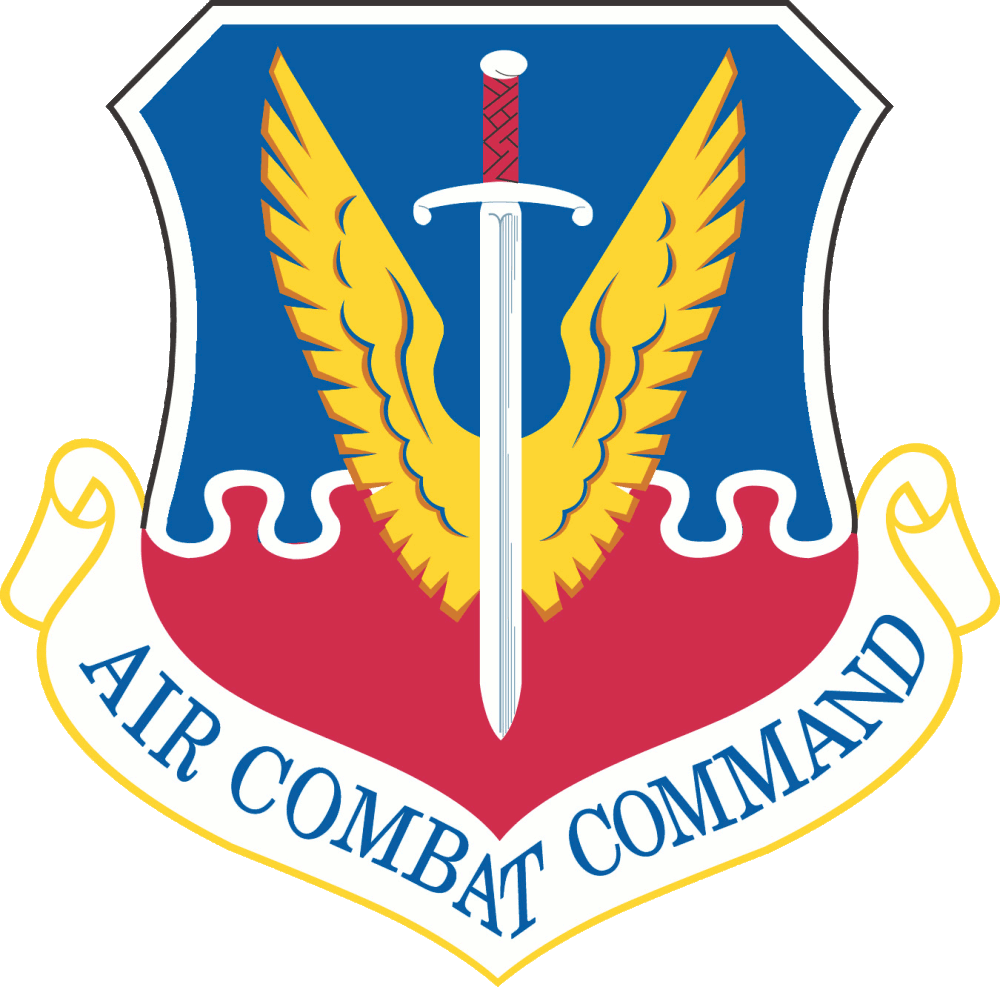
376th Air Expeditionary Wing

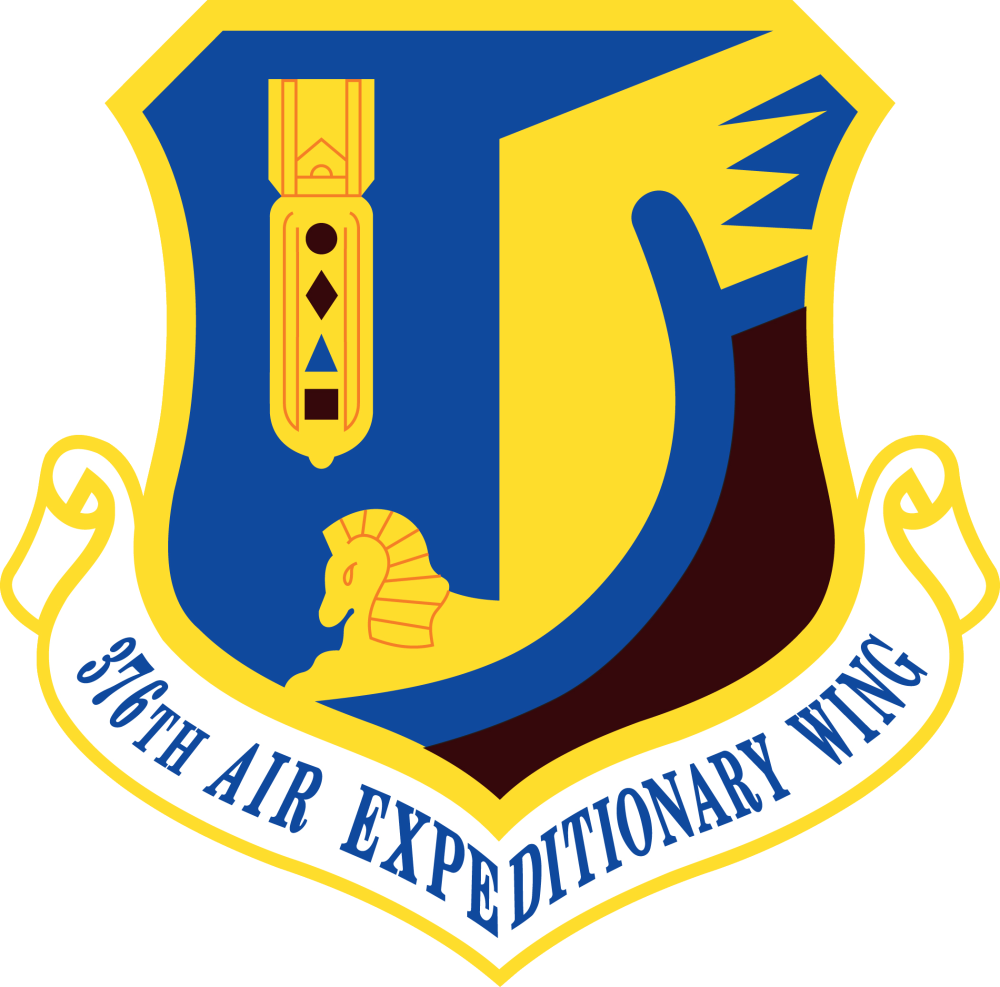
- 376th Air Expeditionary Wing emblem
- Active: 1951–1966; 1970–1991; 2001–2014
- Country: United States
- Branch: United States Air Force
- Role: Combat support
- Part of: Air Combat Command
- Motto: LIBERANDOS
- Engagements: Vietnam Service (1970–1973); War in Afghanistan (2001-2021)

Commanders
- Notable commanders: Richard W. Fellows

The 376th Air Expeditionary Wing was a provisional wing of the United States Air Force. It was last active at the Transit Center at Manas International Airport, Kyrgyz Republic, supporting U.S. and International Security Assistance Force (ISAF) operations in Afghanistan.

During the Vietnam War, the 376th Strategic Wing was a Strategic Air Command unit. It bombed Vietnam and flew air refueling missions over Southeast Asia with deployed elements from wings in the United States. From 1973 until the end of the Cold War it performed air refueling of Pacific Air Forces tactical and Military Airlift Command transport aircraft in the Theater as well as performing strategic reconnaissance operations. It was inactivated as part of the drawdown of USAF strategic forces in 1991.

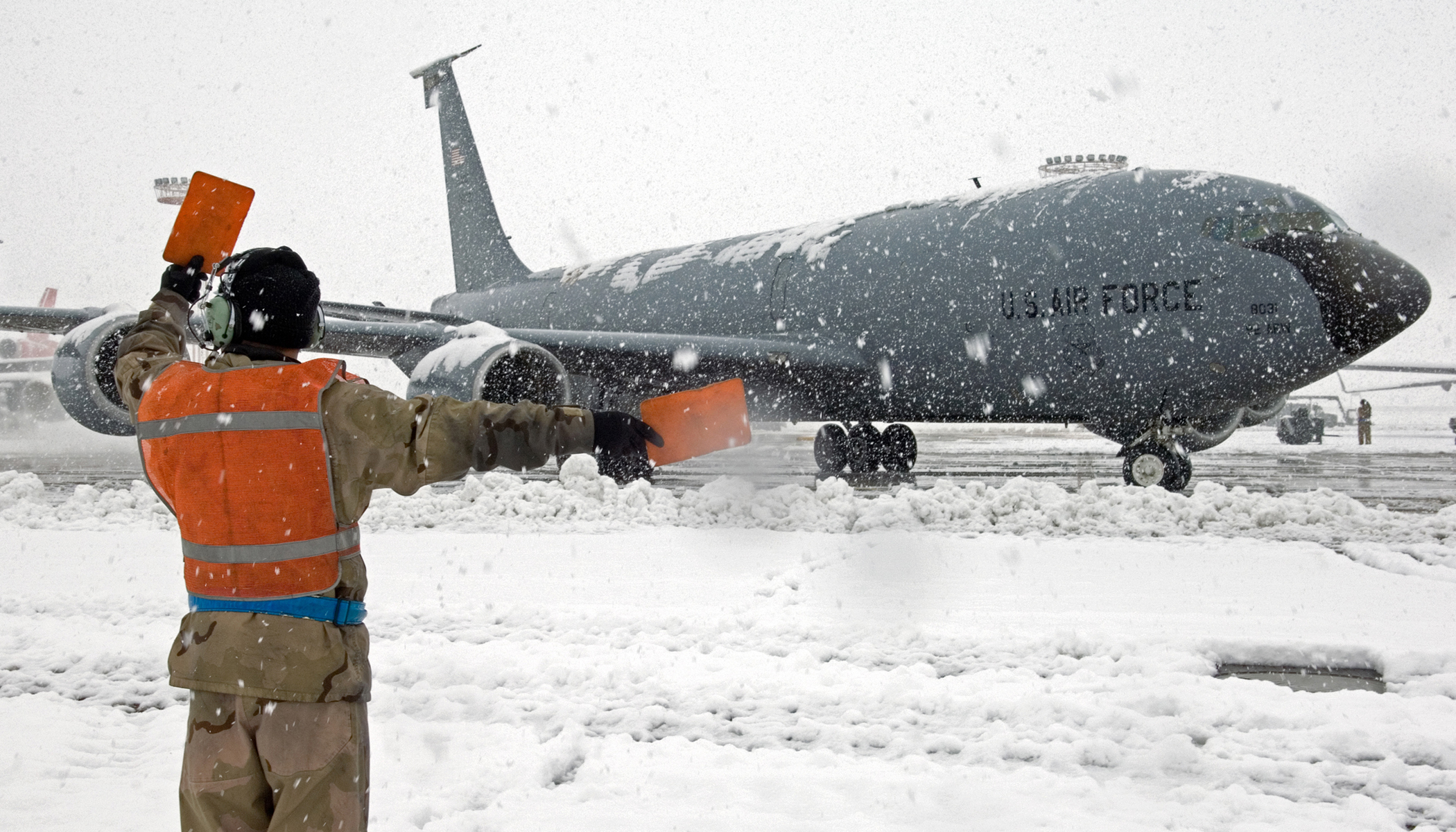
Staff Sgt. Manuel Garibay directs a KC-135 Stratotanker at Manas Air Base, Kyrgyzstan, 11 November taxiing out for a refueling mission. Sergeant Garibay is a maintainer with the 376th Air Expeditionary Wing

== History ==
=== Cold War ===
The 376th Bombardment Wing, Medium was established on 25 May 1951, and activated at Forbes Air Force Base, Kansas on 1 June 1951. The wing was initially equipped with B-29s and trained in strategic bombardment operations. Replaced the propeller-driven B-29s with new Boeing B-47E Stratojet swept-wing medium bombers in 1954, capable of flying at high subsonic speeds and primarily designed for penetrating the airspace of the Soviet Union. The wing gained the 376th Air Refueling Squadron, equipped with Boeing KC-97 Stratofreighters, on 18 August 1953.

Moved to Lockbourne AFB, Ohio in 1957, and continued to fly numerous training missions and participated in various SAC exercises and deployments with the Stratojet. Beginning in September 1957, the wing began engaging in Electronic countermeasures operations, which became the wing's primary mission. Included EB-47L Stratojet post attack command and control operations, December 1962 – February 1965.

In the early 1960s, the B-47 was considered to be reaching obsolescence, and was being phased out of SAC's strategic arsenal. Began to send the wing's aircraft to Davis–Monthan AFB in 1964. The unit was inactivated at Lockbourne Air Force Base, Ohio, on 15 March 1965 as part of the phaseout of the B-47 from the USAF inventory.

=== 376th Strategic Wing ===
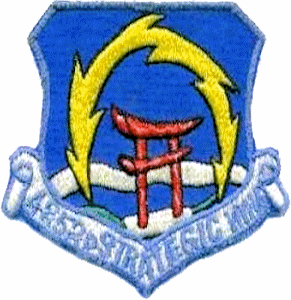
Emblem of the 4252d Strategic Wing

The origins of the wing's period as the 376th Strategic Wing came when SAC established the 4252d Strategic Wing at Kadena Air Base, Okinawa on 12 January 1965 and assigned it to the 3d Air Division. The 4252d SW was a SAC Major Command controlled (MAJCON) unit with the mission to support SAC's Boeing B-52 Stratofortress aircraft (B-52Ds and B-52Fs) and KC-135 Stratotankers from SAC Continental United States bases engaged in combat operations over Southeast Asia from Kadena on a daily basis during the Vietnam War. It was initially assigned a single maintenance squadron, but before the end of the year had three squadrons assigned.

The 4252d equipment consisted of about 110 KC-135 Tankers that refueled tactical fighters over the South China Sea and Gulf of Tonkin that were carrying out attacks on North Vietnam. In addition the aircraft would evacuate personnel to other Pacific bases when typhoons threatened Okinawa while flying scheduled aerial refueling missions.

In early 1968, the wing mission expanded to include aerial reconnaissance, when the 82d Strategic Reconnaissance Squadron (SRS) was assigned to the wing. On 21 August 1968, the 4252d Munitions Maintenance Squadron was activated to oversee the wing's munitions in anticipation of the addition of B-52s to the wing's aircraft. The B-52s conducted Operation Arc Light strategic bombardment missions over North Viet Nam, refueling from the tankers on their return trip to Kadena.

On 19 November 1968, a B-52 from the wing crashed at Kadena.

In 1970, Headquarters SAC received authority from Headquarters USAF to discontinue the 4252d SW, which was equipped with combat aircraft, and to activate an Air Force controlled (AFCON) unit which could carry a lineage and history. (Note: MAJCON units could not carry a permanent history or lineage. Ravenstein, Charles A. (1984). A Guide to Air Force Lineage and Honors (2d, Revised ed.). Maxwell AFB, AL: USAF Historical Research Center. p. 12..) On 1 April 1970, the 4252d was replaced by the 376th, which had been redesignated the 376th Strategic Wing. The 82d Strategic Reconnaissance Squadron was transferred to the 376th, while the 4252d's maintenance squadrons were replaced by ones with the 376th numerical designation of the new wing. Each of the new units assumed the personnel, equipment, and mission of its predecessor. (Note: The 376th Wing continued, through temporary bestowal, the history, and honors of the World War II 376th Bombardment Group. It was also entitled to retain the honors (but not the history or lineage) of the 4252d.)

The rotational B-52 elements were shifted to the 307th Strategic Wing at U-Tapao Royal Thai Navy Airfield, Thailand soon afterward. Using aircraft and crews deployed from CONUS-based SAC wings, the 376th SW controlled the 909th Air Refueling Squadron (KC-135A/Q/R) and supported rotational reconnaissance aircraft (TR-1, SR-71). It conducted airborne radio relay operations, April–November 1970; February–June 1971 and March 1972 – August 1973. The Wing was inactivated at Kadena on 30 October 1991 with the drawdown of strategic forces after the end of the Cold War. Its mission was absorbed by the host 18th Wing.

=== War in Afghanistan ===
Manas air base operations began 16 December 2001 and included the 86th Contingency Response Group from Ramstein Air Base, Germany as well as contractors and French engineers. The base hosted forces from Australia, Denmark, France, Italy, New Zealand, Norway, South Korea, Spain and the Netherlands. Aircraft previously based here have included tankers (KC-135s), tactical airlift (C-130s), fighters (F-18, F-16, Mirage 2000) and helicopters (Super Puma) from multiple states.

In February 2009, the Kyrgyz Parliament voted to close the base after the two governments failed to agree on a higher rent for the property. American and Kyrgyz officials continued negotiations after the announcement, and on 23 June a tentative agreement was reached. Under the new arrangement, the United States will pay $200 million, three times the previous rent, for continued use of the facilities. Before the handover to the Kyrgyz military, Kyrgyz forces handled security in the areas surrounding the facility, while American forces provided security for the facility, and the site was then called a "transit center" instead of an "air base".

After Russian pressure on Kyrgyzstan, increased rent payments, and renewed pressure to leave, the United States removed its forces from the base in 2014 and the wing was inactivated.

== Lineage ==
- Constituted as the 376th Bombardment Wing (Medium) on 25 May 1951

Activated on 1 June 1951
Discontinued and inactivated on 15 March 1965.
Redesignated 376th Strategic Wing on 23 January 1970
Activated on 1 April 1970
Inactivated 30 October 1991
Redesignated 376th Air Expeditionary Wing and converted to provisional status, on 4 December 2001
Inactivated on 3 June 2014

== Assignments ==
- 4th Air Division, 1 June 1951 (attached to 21st Air Division, 1 June-10 October 1951)
- 801st Air Division, 3 December 1951 – 15 March 1965
- Eighth Air Force, 1 April 1970
- 3d Air Division, 1 January 1975 – 1 October 1991
- Air Combat Command to activate or inactivate at any time after 4 December 2001

== Components ==
Groups

- 376th Bombardment Group (later 376th Expeditionary Operations Group): 1 June 1951 – 16 June 1952 (not operational), 4 Dec 2001–2014

Squadrons

- 65th Strategic Squadron: 1 July 1990 – 2 October 1991
- 82d Strategic Reconnaissance Squadron: 1 April 1970 – 30 September 1976
- 91st Air Refueling Squadron: 1 December 1957 – 15 June 1964
- 376th Air Refueling Squadron: 18 August 1953 – 1 December 1957
- 512th Bombardment Squadron: attached 1 June 1951 – 15 June 1952, assigned 16 June 1952 – 15 March 1965
- 513th Bombardment Squadron: attached 1 June 1951 – 15 June 1952, assigned 16 June 1952 – 15 March 1965
- 514th Bombardment Squadron: attached 1 June 1951 – 15 June 1952, assigned 16 June 1952 – 15 March 1965
- 514th Bombardment Squadron: 1 December 1958 – 1 January 1962
- 909th Air Refueling Squadron: 1 July 1971 – 1 October 1991 (detached 5 November 1990 – 15 March 1991)
- 4102d Air Refueling Squadron, Provisional: attached 6 June-8 November 1972; attached 18 December 1972 – 22 January 1973
- 4180th Bombardment Squadron: 1 April – 1 July 1970 (not operational)
- 4220th Air Refueling Squadron: 1 April 1970 – 31 January 1971
- 4363d Support (later, 4363d Post Attack Command and Control) Squadron: attached 20 July 1962 – 15 February 1965

== Stations ==
- Forbes Air Force Base, Kansas, 1 June 1951
- Barksdale Air Force Base, Louisiana, 10 October 1951
- Lockbourne Air Force Base, Ohio, 1 December 1957 – 15 March 1965
- Kadena Air Base, Okinawa, Japan, 1 April 1970 – 1 October 1991.
- Transit Center at Manas, Kyrgyz Republic, 4 December 2001 – 6 June 2014

== Aircraft ==
- B-29 Superfortress, 1951–1954
- B/E/EB-47 Stratojet, 1954–1965
- E-47 Stratojet, 1958–1961
- KC-97 Stratofreighter, 1953–1963
- KC-135 Stratotanker, 1963–1964; 1970–1991
- B-52D Stratofortress, 1970
- RC-135, 1970–1991

== See also ==
- List of B-29 Superfortress operators
- List of B-47 units of the United States Air Force
- List of B-52 Units of the United States Air Force
