= Ernest Harmon Air Force Base =

Former Air Force base in Canada

Ernest Harmon Air Force Base
- Stephenville, Newfoundland and Labrador
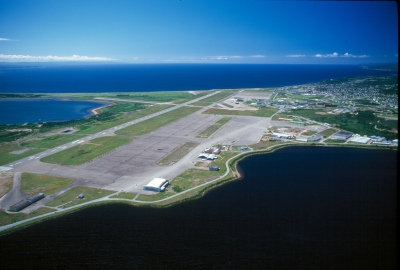
- Stephenville Airport, formerly Ernest Harmon AFB

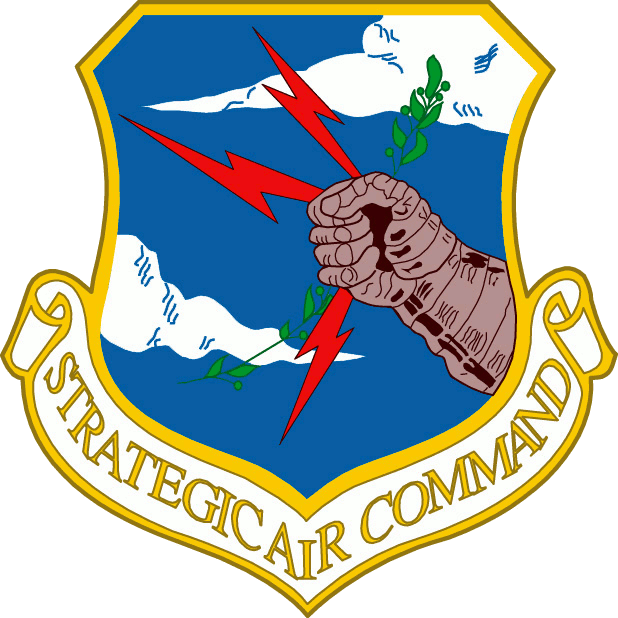
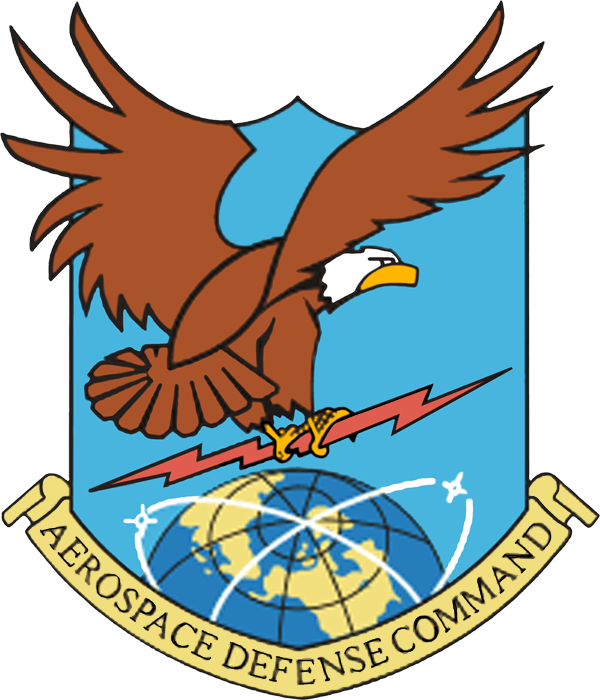

Site information
- Type: Air Force Base
- Owner: Department of Defense
- Operator: United States Air Force
- Civilian operator: Stephenville Airport Corporation

Location
- Location on Newfoundland
- Coordinates: 48°32′38″N 058°33′12″W

Site history
- Built: 1941
- Built by: United States Air Force
- In use: 1941 – 1966
- Fate: Transferred to Government of Canada to become Stephenville International Airport

Garrison information
- Garrison: United States Air Force; United States Army Air Corps; Aerospace Defense Command; Strategic Air Command; Newfoundland Base Command; Air Transport Command; Northeast Air Command
- Occupants: 4081st Strategic Wing; 4731st Air Defense Group; 6602d Air Base Group; 61st Fighter Squadron; 347th Engineer Aviation Battalion

Airfield information
- Identifiers: IATA: YJT, ICAO: CYJT
- Elevation: 80 ft (24 m) AMSL
Runways
Direction	Length and surface
09/27	10,000 ft (3,000 m) Asphalt concrete
02/20	5,000 ft (1,500 m) Asphalt concrete
14/32	5,000 ft (1,500 m) Asphalt concrete

Ernest Harmon Air Force Base is a former United States Air Force base located in Stephenville, Newfoundland and Labrador. The base was built by the United States Army Air Forces in 1941 under the Destroyers for Bases Agreement with the United Kingdom.

From its establishment in 1941 until March 31, 1949, the base was located in the Dominion of Newfoundland. On March 31, 1949, the Dominion of Newfoundland was admitted to Canadian Confederation and became the 10th province of Canada. The agreement enabling the base's existence, from 1941 until closure in 1966, enabled it to function as a de facto enclave of United States territory within, first the Dominion of Newfoundland and later Canada, making United States military personnel stationed at the base subject to the Uniform Code of Military Justice.

March 3, 1960, while returning home from his army stint, Elvis Presley landed on Ernest Harmon Air Force Base for a refueling en route from Frankfurt, Germany and Glasgow Prestwick Airport, Prestwick, Scotland to McGuire Airforce Base in Fort Dix, New Jersey, US. Apart from 2 concerts in 1957, Elvis never returned to Canada during his lifetime.

Following its closure in 1966, the base property was relinquished by the Government of the United States to the Government of Canada, under the terms of the original deal. The Government of Canada subsequently transferred the base property to the Government of Newfoundland and Labrador, which established the Harmon Corporation to oversee the disposition and use of the base property and facilities.

The airfield is now operated as Stephenville International Airport while many of the base's support buildings and housing have been incorporated into the town of Stephenville.

== Construction and operation ==
During 1940, Germany was threatening the majority of Europe, as well as North America, through its successful air, land and sea campaigns. The destructiveness of the Luftwaffe and Kriegsmarine in the Battle of Britain and Battle of the Atlantic alarmed military planners in the United States who theorized that the Nazis could in future establish a beachhead on Newfoundland and the adjacent French islands of Saint Pierre and Miquelon and use it for launching air attacks and eventually land and sea attacks on the industrial heartland of North America.

In 1940, the United States entered into the Destroyers for Bases deal with the government of the United Kingdom, allowing the US military to establish facilities in British Overseas Territories in the Western Hemisphere. The primary focus for North American defence from Nazi aggression was Newfoundland, which the United States sought to arm as a geographic buffer much as it was doing with its Alaska territory to defend North America against Imperial Japan in the northwest.

The United States established an administrative army air force and coast defense base named Fort Pepperrell in St. John's, along with a deepwater naval base and naval aviation field at Argentia on the Avalon Peninsula. The northeast coast of Newfoundland and the strategically important Strait of Belle Isle were left exposed, therefore military planners sought to establish an army air force base on 8,159 acres (33.02 km^{2}) of land at the northeast end of Bay St. George near the coastal hamlet of Stephenville. The 76th Congress approved the 99-year lease and in April 1941, construction began on a deepwater port and adjacent air field.

During the war a battery of two 155 mm coast defense guns was at the base, due to its coastal location. It was called Battery T8503 and was operated by Coast Artillery Corps troops of the Harbor Defenses of Argentia and St. John's.

The air force base was originally referred to as Stephenville Air Base. On September 1, 1943, the Newfoundland Base Command transferred control of the Stephenville Air Base to the North Atlantic Wing, Air Transport Command. The base was actively used throughout the war and was one of the largest U.S. military airfields located outside of the continental United States; it was capable of landing the largest cargo aircraft in the world at that time and the base became a frequent stopping and refueling point for USAAF aircraft crossing the Atlantic. Stephenville Air Base was renamed "Ernest Harmon Air Force Base" on June 23, 1948, in honor of Captain Ernest Emery Harmon. Capt Harmon was a U.S. Army Air Corps pilot who was killed in an air crash in 1933. The deepwater port which supported the base was named Port Harmon at this time.

Ernest Harmon AFB was transferred to Northeast Air Command in October 1950. The 6605th Air Base Wing served as the host unit at the base. In April 1957, with the rising threat of nuclear war, the Strategic Air Command (SAC) assumed control of the base for use as a forward refuelling point. The 6605th Wing was superseded by the 4081st Strategic Wing. Ernest Harmon AFB became home to a fleet of KC-97 Stratofreighter air refueling aircraft, which were kept on alert in order to meet and refuel nuclear armed B-52 Stratofortress bombers in the skies over western Newfoundland. The base also saw use as a refueling stop for transatlantic military flights and the base supported three Aerospace Defense Command (ADC) units. In 1957, the Canadian Department of Transport constructed an airport terminal to accommodate Trans-Canada Air Lines (now Air Canada) commercial flights; Ernest Harmon AFB being the only air field in western Newfoundland.

=== Aerodrome ===
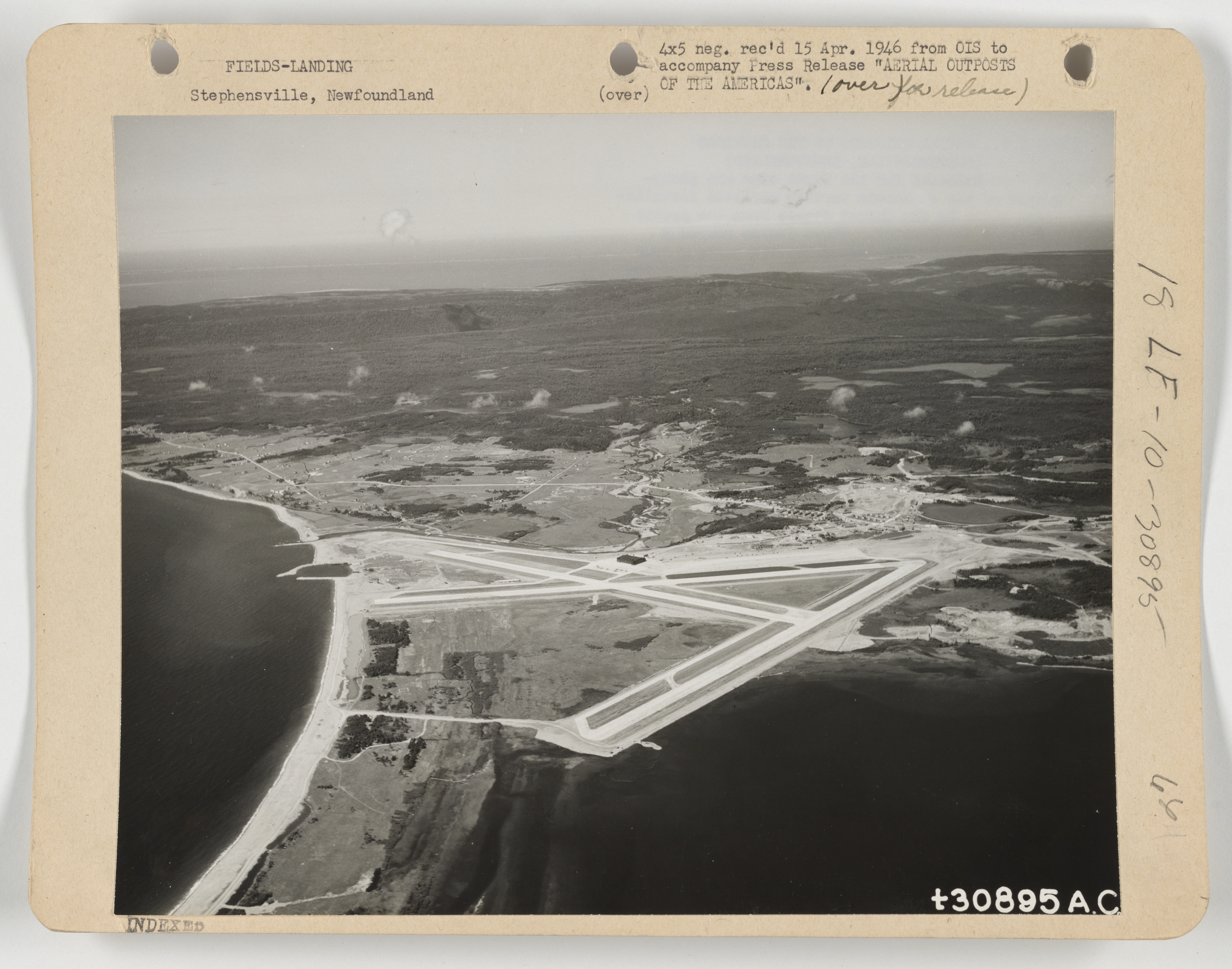
Aerial photograph circa 1945

In 1942 the aerodrome was listed as USAAF Aerodrome – Stephenville, Newfoundland at 48°32′N 58°33′W with a variation of 30 degrees west and elevation of 40 ft (12 m). The field was listed as "all hard surfaced" and had three runways listed as follows:

Runway name	Length	Width	Surface
7/25	5,000 ft (1,500 m)	150 ft (46 m)	Hard surfaced
12/30	5,200 ft (1,600 m)	150 ft (46 m)	Hard surfaced
14/32	5,000 ft (1,500 m)	150 ft (46 m)	Hard surfaced

== Cold War expansion and road construction ==
The Cold War expansion of the base in the early 1950s coincided with the Korean War and the rise in nuclear tensions with the Soviet Union. The USAF sought to build more roads in the area to serve the base and nearby Pinetree Line early warning radar site and to patrol the immediate area for security; the roads would also act as a means of dispersing personnel in an emergency. One of the more important projects was a bypass road around the base, known as the Hansen Memorial Highway.

In 1953, the 347th (Engineer Aviation) battalion was assigned the immense task (along with 2,502 contractor personnel) of completing the 62 line construction projects at Ernest Harmon AFB. These consisted of:

- completion of major runways of up to 222,000 yd^{2} (186,000 m^{2})
- taxiway and aprons of up to 421,000 yd^{2} (352,000 m^{2})
- aprons of heavy duty pavement up to 351,000 yd^{2} (293,000 m^{2})
- construct a runway complex that was so large that the existing harbor facilities at Port Harmon had to be demolished to give proper clearance for aircraft
- construction of fighter aircraft hangars
- construction of three wharves and dredging of the existing harbour at Port Harmon, which, when completed was 8,000 ft (2,400 m) long, 200 ft (61 m) wide, and 35 ft (11 m) deep
- construction of a flight control tower in September 1953
- construction of four petroleum tanks with a capacity of 25,000 to 125,000 bbl (4,000 to 19,900 m^{3}) of aviation fuel

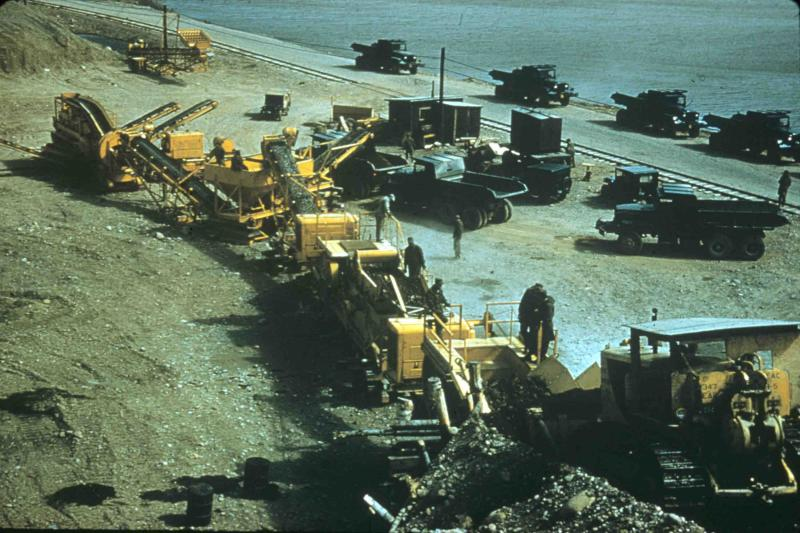
Rock crushing operations along the Hansen Highway 1960

By June 1953 the 347th Engineers had deployed 444 engineers. They were joined by an additional 750 engineers who departed Florida and arrived at Harmon on June 23 to construct three of the line construction projects:

- a bypass road Hanson Memorial Highway to prevent civilian access through the base (in progress since April, 1943)
- a base salvage yard
- a trailer park for Harmon personnel
- removal of a granite hill the north end of the Frobisher Bay AFB runway

The 347th Engineers was made up of four companies; three line companies and one Headquarters and Service (H&S) company. Company A was responsible for construction of the salvage yard and Company B and C were responsible for the construction of the bypass road with a budget of $583,000.

The salvage yard, which was situated near Noels Pond on 30 acres (120,000 m^{2}), was finished to partial occupancy by the fall of 1954 and completed in 1955. Thirty Butler Buildings (prefabricated steel) were located on the property. The machinery which constructed the bypass road was buried at the end of the property when it became over used and obsolete in 1959–1960, under the supervision of Warrant Officer Ebb Higdon, Company A. They were later dug up to be sold for scrap but were found to be useless and reburied. This equipment had come up from Florida in Liberty ships, with the battalion in 1953. In 1986, when this information was made available to the town of Stephenville via a series of articles in the Georgian newspaper, several doubters and curiosity seekers, armed with metal detectors, swarmed over the site and located the buried equipment.

Company B and C began work on the bypass road by working towards each other. Company C, under the command of Captain Claxton Ray began at the Stephenville side and worked towards Company B which began construction near Cormiers Village and worked in two directions towards Long Gull Pond and towards Stephenville. It was necessary to begin construction of the road at Cormiers Village and work back towards Stephenville pending the finalizing of property agreements. Company B was under the command of Captain Gomez. The H&S Company split operations equipment and men between the three Companies.

The 11 mi (18 km) long construction began with a line of corduroy roads comprising one half of the road and when Long Gull Pond was reached in the fall of 1954, the other half was constructed. The road followed the existing rail road line. It was necessary to build three access roads approximately 2 mi (3.2 km) in length in order to facilitate construction of the bypass road. These roads were built to the same specifications as the bypass road as they were used constantly for heavy hauling. The concrete bridge over Cold Creek was built in 1954 and the 60 ft (18 m) concrete bridge over Warm Creek was programmed for completion in 1956. Not counting equipment, 90,000 yd^{3} (69,000 m^{3}) of fill. 30,000 yd^{3} (23,000 m^{3}) of crushed rock and 15,000 yd^{3} (11,000 m^{3}) of earth were used before the final 19 in (480 mm) of paving was laid down. Equipment and material were stored at the Gull Pond site. The bypass road was officially opened to the public in October 1957 and named the Hanson Memorial Highway. The third construction operation was cancelled.

The 347th (changed to the 823rd in 1954) Engineer Aviation Battalion was disbanded in 1957 and most of the men went back to the US. The two battalion commanders at the time were, Colonel Germain and Major Truet. The medical officer was V.H. Berry and the ground safety officer was 1st Lieutenant Arthur Everitt. The general construction on the base (buildings, roads and runways) was done under the base supervision of Colonel Koski and Colonel Bailey. J.A. Jones held the construction contract from 1954 to 1959. From 1956 to 1959, Major Ray was the superintendent for the asphalt, rock crushing and concrete operations for J.A. Jones and was responsible for the construction of 200 on base houses, two seven-story barracks for 1,500 airmen, additional runways and the Central Heating (steam) Plant. One of the barracks is used as residences for the College of the North Atlantic as well as a hotel during the summer tourist season. The other barrack was converted into a six-story apartment complex known as the Stephenville Manor.

== Base facilities ==
=== Base schools ===
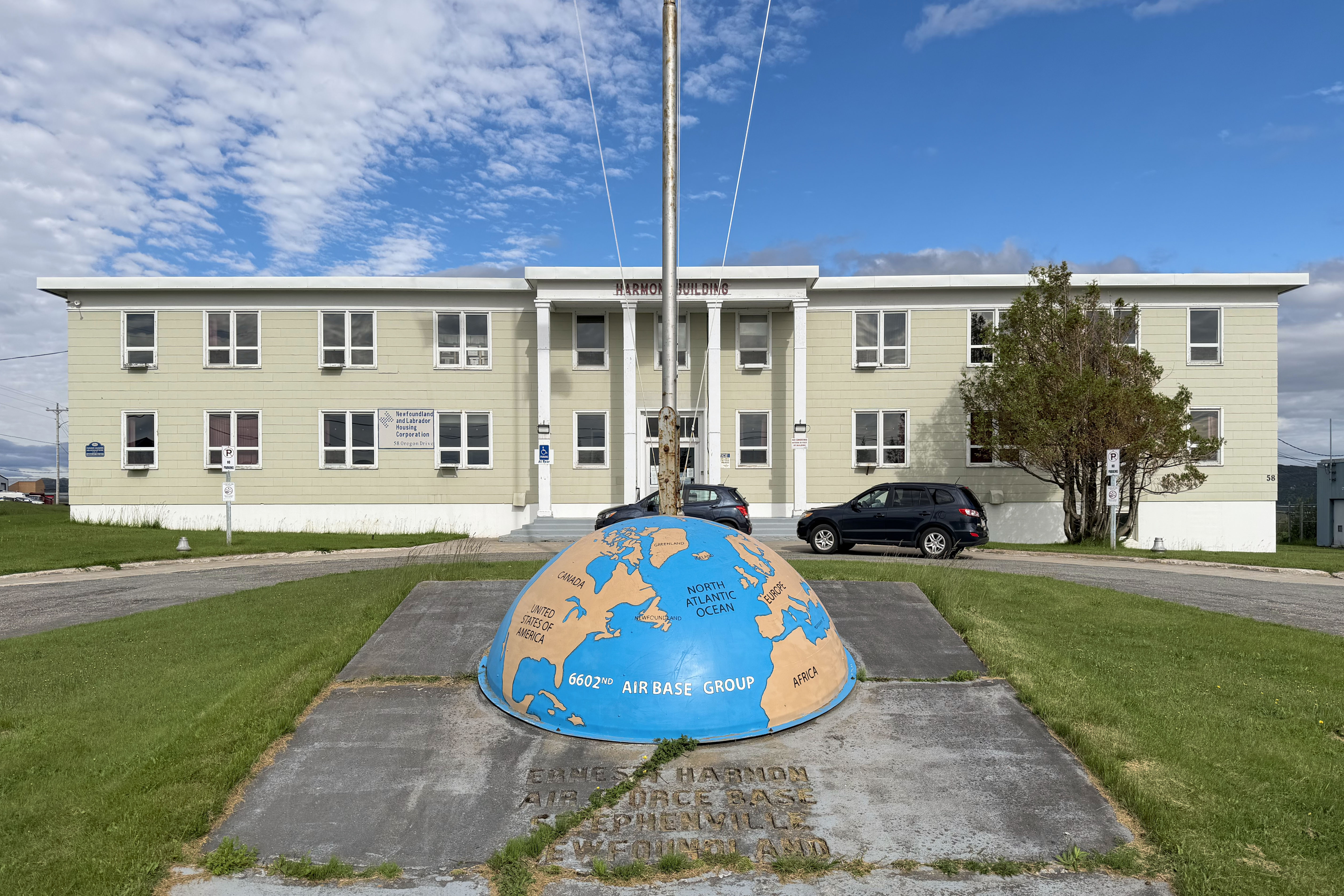
Harmon Building, the former base headquarters

The first educational institution at Ernest Harmon AFB was an elementary school established in 1948 using a small clap-board building that housed 28 children and 3 teachers. The first high school graduating class (1957) matriculated in 1953 with all of the students beginning their educations at St. Stephens High School in Stephenville. A new elementary school was built near the base entrance in 1955. The school was formally opened in May 1956 by former base commander, Colonel Richard Fellows and the school principal. In 1956, there were 19 teachers and 62 children.

On September 4, 1956, the base high school officially opened in building number T-394, the old elementary school building. In 1958, Harmon High established its own newspaper, The Harmon Highlight.

The base's civilian dependent population continued to grow during the early 1960s and the schools expanded along with them. A new high school was opened and in 1962–63, the high school teaching staff increased to 25 while the elementary-middle school staff of teachers jumped to 42.

By 1965–66, the last year of military operations at Ernest Harmon AFB, the total school population had grown to over 1,000 elementary students and 38 teachers and the high school had a population of 171 junior high and 235 high school students with 28 teachers. When the base closed in 1966, so did the school system; the system had 1,175 elementary students and 43 teachers, as well as 405 junior and high school students and 26 teachers, upon closure.

=== Recreation ===
Stephenville Air Base and later Ernest Harmon AFB were located in the protection of the Long Range Mountains and harbour of the St. Georges Bay area, virtually cut off from rest of the island, except for a few roads and boat and plane traffic. But during the 1940s and 1950s, when roads were virtually non-existent and surface travel was limited to the slow narrow-gauge passenger trains of the Newfoundland Railway which linked to small coastal steamships or ferries to the mainland at North Sydney, Nova Scotia. In addition, the airfield's location at the head of Bay St. George was one of the more geographically isolated parts of the island, being surrounded by the Long Range Mountains and the coastline of the island's west coast being dotted with outports. In addition to USAAF/USAF aircraft, the only other option for travel was the railway and ferries/coasters, or exploring the limited local road network which stretched along the coast and into the uninhabited interior of the island.

The base also precipitated an economic boom of sorts on Newfoundland's southwest coast during the 1940s. Corner Brook was the major population centre for the region, given its industrial base, harbour, and nearby recreational opportunities in the Humber Valley. With the investment of the USAAF in Stephenville, the St. George's Bay area began to flourish and grew rapidly. The village of Stephenville grew from a hamlet of several hundred people with no paved streets, side walks, water or sewage system in 1941 into a modern town of over 5,000 by the mid-1950s. By the time Ernest Harmon AFB closed in the mid-1960s, the town had more than doubled in size, partly as a result of the provincial government's forced resettlement policy toward residents of outports.

Recognizing the link between geographic and social isolation, the base command incorporated a number of recreational facilities into their programs and building projects, making Ernest Harmon AFB a leader of sorts among USAF facilities. By the mid-1950s, thousands of service men and their families were making use of these activities monthly. In the area of Hobby Shops there was space available for leather craft, ceramics, amateur radio, lapidary, woodworking, automotive shops, model airplanes and photo labs. Sports facilities and groups were set for softball, baseball, bowling, golf, picnicking, archery and guns. The Stephenville area was located near good hunting and fishing grounds, thus the base established a fishing lodge at Camp 33 with eight large cabins, a 40-man bunk house, along with a mess hall and kitchen. Camp 33 was owned by the Bowater Pulp and Paper Company which had a mill in Corner Brook, although the camp was leased to the base during the spring and summer months.

Along with outside activities a number of service clubs were built and the University of Maryland University College extension courses were set up for those wishing to continue their education while on the base. A local broadcasting station and commercial free radio station was in operation by the mid-1950s with as many as six live shows a week being broadcast as well as live theater and plays being made available and a movie theater. A large gymnasium was built in 1956 with a seating capacity of 500, two squash courts and four wall courts. The base chapel accommodated up to 1500 worshippers of many religions and faiths per week. The library was also one of the most frequently used facilities with an average book lending rate of 1000 books every month. The most popular recreational feature of the entire base was the Base Theater which ran a new movie every night except Sundays and Mondays. There were four shows a day and a matinee on Saturdays.

Given its size and importance, and the large number of personnel assigned during the height of the Cold War in the 1950s, the base managed to attract many celebrities to visit and/or perform, including Marilyn Monroe, Elvis Presley, Frank Sinatra and Bob Hope. In the early years of the base, recreational activities off base in the town of Stephenville were very limited and some were often restricted. In some of the pamphlets released by the base to its airmen, they went as far as giving the names of women and particular houses and taverns that no base personnel were to be in or near, as well as rules about fraternizing with the local girls.

== See also ==
- Eastern Air Defense Force (Air Defense Command)
