= 4081st Strategic Wing =

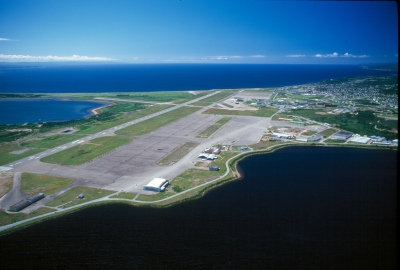
- Aerial view of Ernest Harmon Air Force Base
- Active: 1957–1966
- Country: United States
- Branch: United States Air Force
- Role: Command of forward deployed strategic forces
- Part of: Strategic Air Command

Insignia
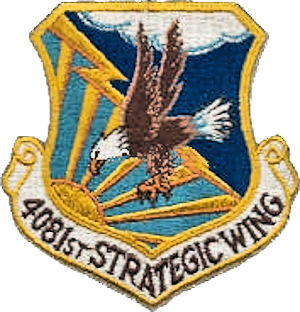
- Patch with the 4081st Strategic Wing emblem

The 4081st Strategic Wing is a discontinued United States Air Force unit, stationed at Ernest Harmon Air Force Base, Newfoundland, where it was inactivated on 25 June 1966.

== History ==
The 4081st Strategic Wing was a non-flying ground service support element for Strategic Air Command (SAC) at Ernest Harmon Air Force Base, Newfoundland, Canada from April 1957 until June 1966. When activated, the wing assumed the mission, manpower, equipment, weapons, and facilities of the 6605th Air Base Wing, which had been established on 1 June 1954. Eighth Air Force provided intermediate command and control from its establishment until 1 January 1959, when the 45th Air Division became its assigned headquarters.

United States Air Force (USAF) and Army Air Forces personnel had been assigned to Harmon since 1941. It was first operated as a refueling stop on the North Atlantic transport route, later as a fighter-interceptor base assigned to Northeast Air Command. SAC assumed control of base in 1957 and established the 4081st Strategic Wing when facility was upgraded to provide a deployment base for SAC bombers and tankers. The base supported deployed aircraft, with no permanent operational aircraft assigned to the wing, controlling them through the "Harmon Task Force." The wing was discontinued in 1966 and its remaining personnel and equipment were transferred to the 4081st Air Base Squadron until the USAF presence at Harmon ended in January 1967 and the base was turned over to the Royal Canadian Air Force.

== Lineage ==
- Designated as the 4081st Strategic Wing
- Organized on 1 April 1957
- Discontinued on 25 June 1966

=== Assignments ===
- Eighth Air Force: 1 April 1957
- 45th Air Division: 1 January 1959 – 25 June 1966

=== Stations ===
- Ernest Harmon Air Force Base, Newfoundland, 1 April 1957 – 25 June 1966

=== Components ===
- 867th Medical Group, 1 October 1959 – 25 June 1966
- 4081st Air Base Group (later 4081st Combat Support Group), 1 April 1957 – 25 June 1966
- 4081st USAF Hospital, 1 April 1957 – 1 October 1959
