= 376th Expeditionary Operations Group =

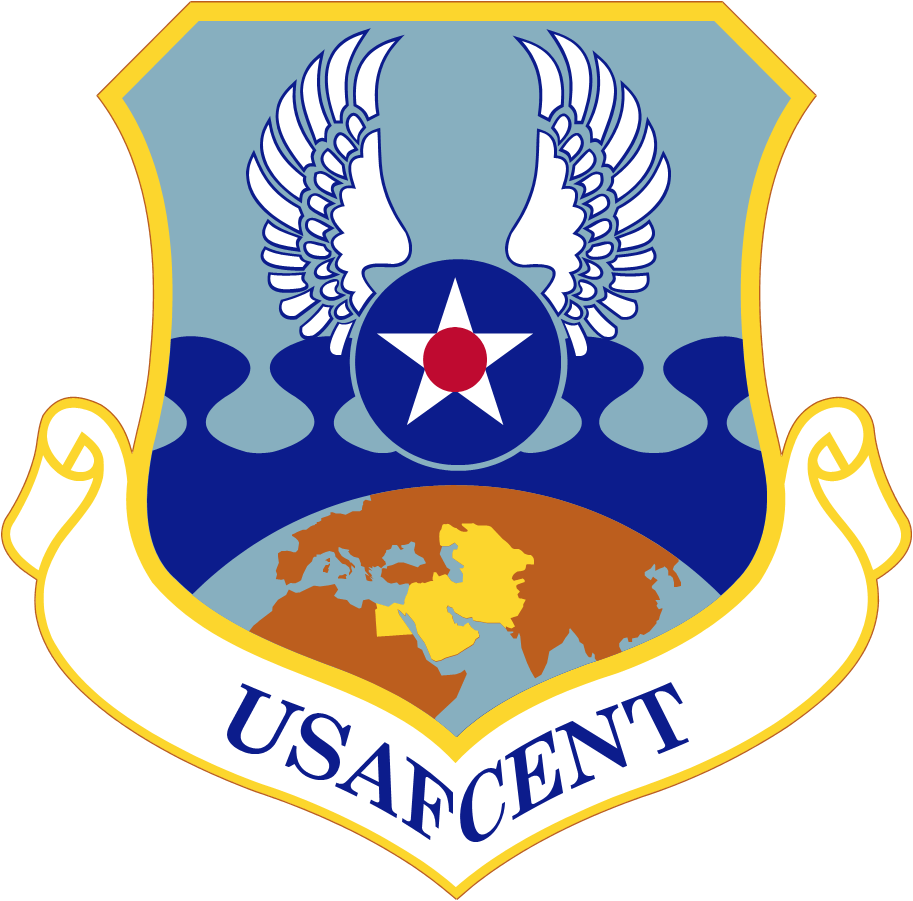
376th Expeditionary Operations Group

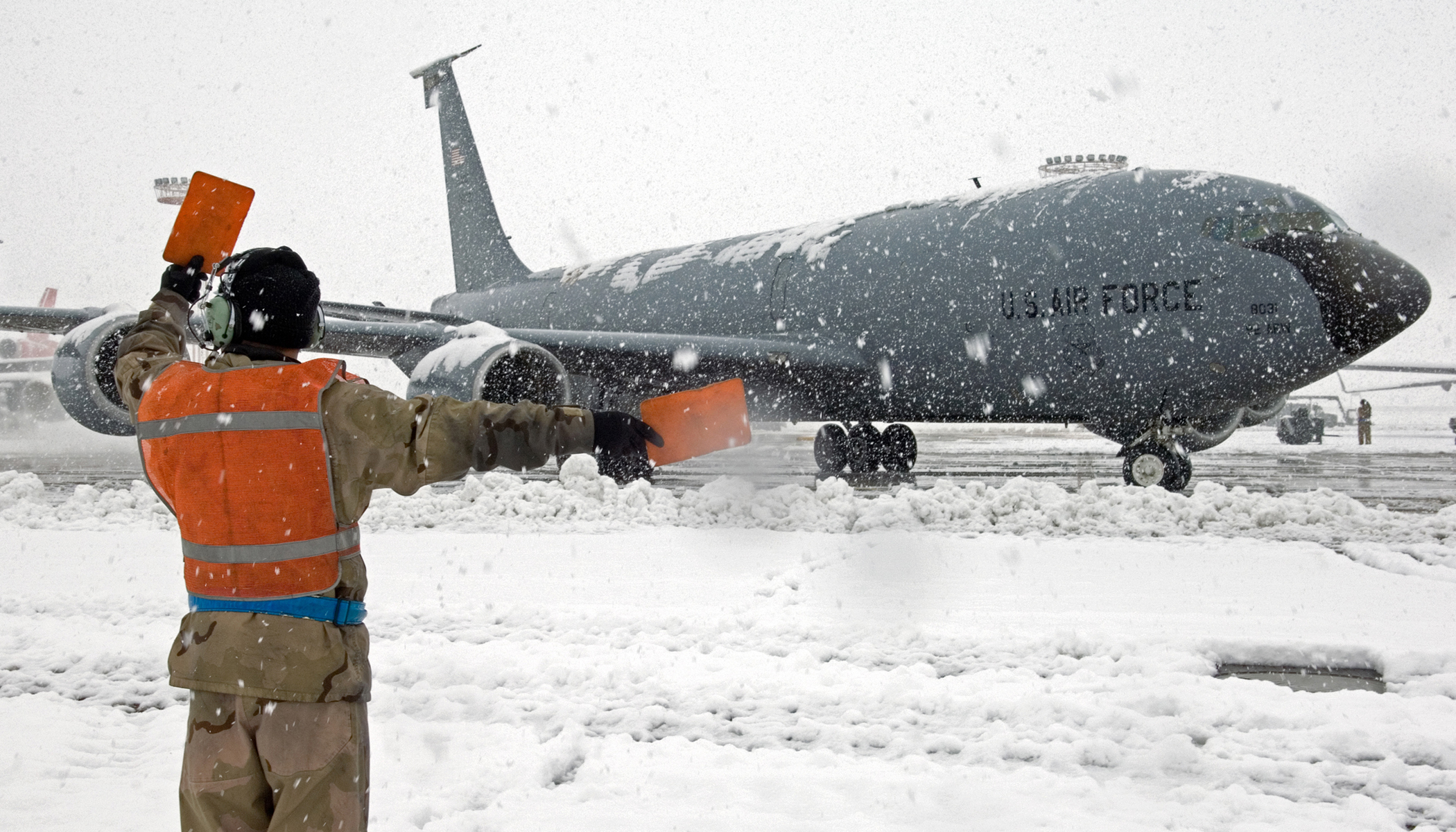
- A 376th airman directs a Boeing KC-135 Stratotanker taxiing for a refueling mission at Manas Air Base, Kyrgyzstan
- Active: 1942–1945; 1947–1948; 1951–1952; 2001–2014
- Country: United States
- Branch: United States Air Force
- Role: Aerial refueling and airlift
- Part of: United States Air Forces Central
- Garrison/HQ: Transit Center at Manas, Kyrgyzstan
- Motto(s): Liberandos
- Engagements: Mediterranean Theater of Operations; War in Afghanistan (2001–present)
- Decorations: Distinguished Unit Citation; Air Force Meritorious Unit Award; Air Force Outstanding Unit Award with Combat "V" Device

Insignia
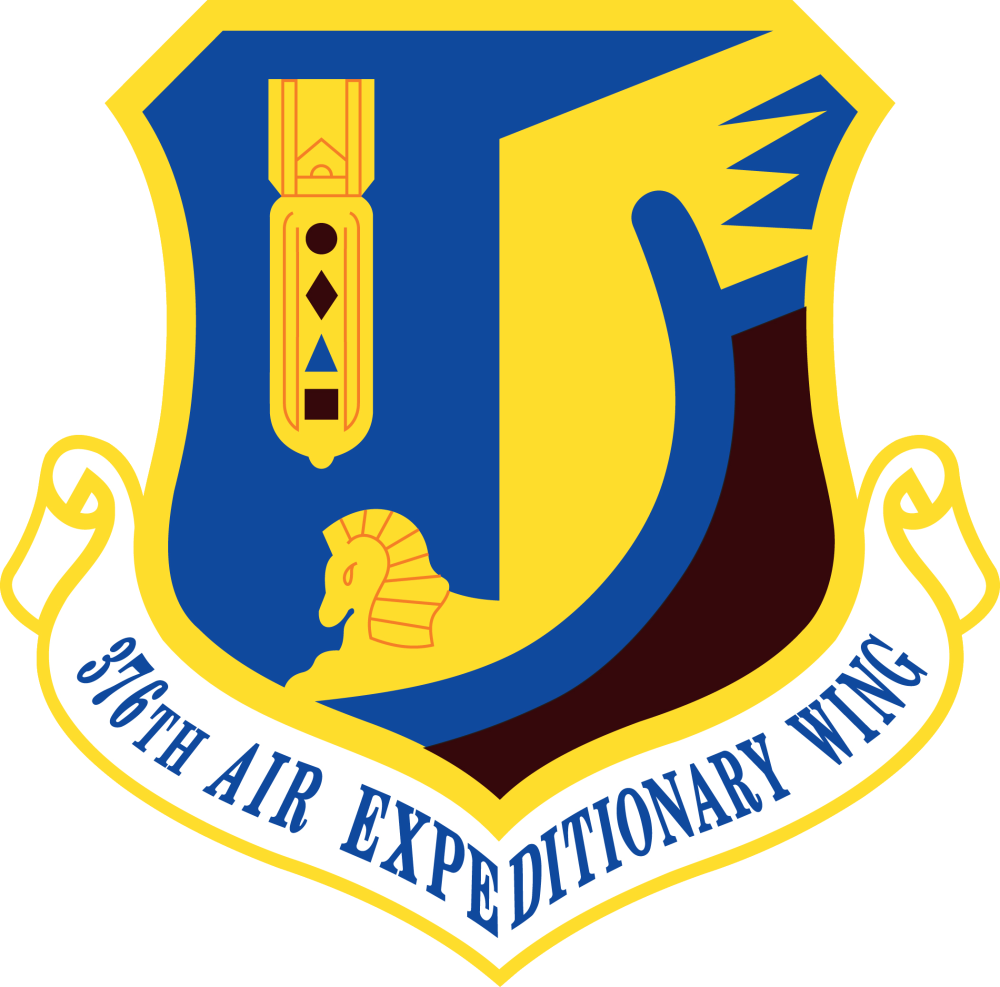
- 376th Air Expeditionary Wing emblem (Note: The group uses the 376th Air Expeditionary Wing emblem with the group designation on the scroll. Air Force Instruction 84-105, Organizational Lineage, Honors and Heraldry, 19 March 2013, para 3.3.3)

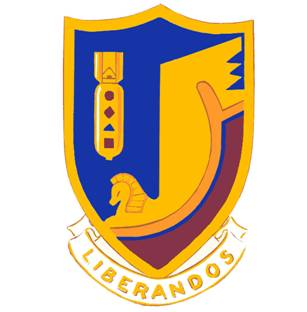
- 376th Bombardment Group emblem (approved 8 November 1951) (Note: This emblem is based on the emblem used by the group during World War II, with the sphinx facing the opposite direction. Watkins, pp. 90–91.)

The 376th Expeditionary Operations Group was a provisional United States Air Force Air Combat Command unit. It was stationed at the Transit Center at Manas International Airport, Kyrgyz Republic, up until 2014.

Originally activated in World War II as the 376th Bombardment Group (Heavy), it was the first Consolidated B-24 Liberator group to be based on the European Continent. The group engaged in combat as part of the Ninth, Twelfth and Fifteenth Air Forces in the Egypt-Libya and Italian Campaigns. The group was awarded Distinguished Unit Citations for operations over North Africa and Sicily, November 1942 – 17 August 1943; Ploiești, Romania, 1 August 1943 and Bratislava, Czechoslovakia, 16 June 1944. The B-24D Lady Be Good was assigned to the 514th Bombardment Squadron.

The 376th is the lead Boeing KC-135 Stratotanker aerial refueling unit for Afghanistan operations. Other USAF aircraft supporting the mission include Boeing C-17 Globemaster IIIs.

== History ==
=== World War II ===
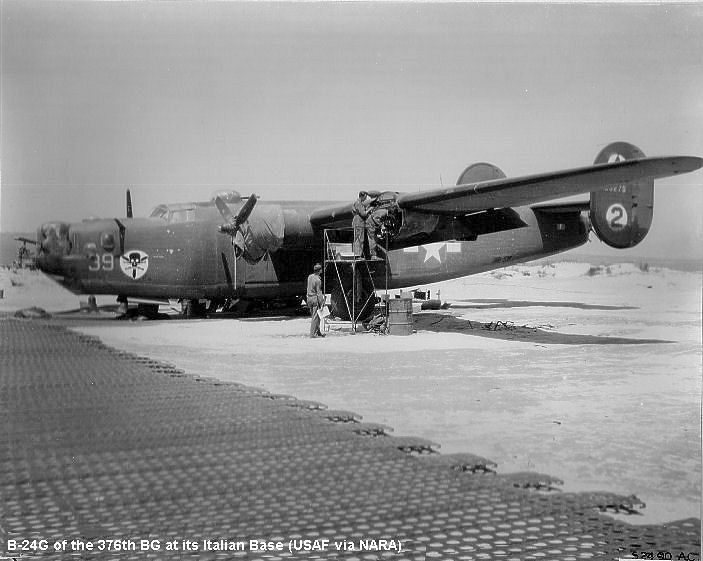
B-24 of the 376th Bomb Group, Italy, 1944

The 376th Bombardment Group has its origins in the British Mandate of Palestine, as a result of the buildup of American air power in the Middle East in January 1942.

Following the attack on Pearl Harbor, President Franklin D. Roosevelt ordered the Army Air Forces to mount retaliatory raids on the Japanese Home Islands. A task force, commanded by Colonel Harry E. Halverson and composed of 231 officers and enlisted men and 23 Consolidated B-24D Liberator bombers, was assembled at Fort Myers Army Air Field, Florida. The unit was given the code name "HALPRO" for Halverson Project. This organization, destined to be the parent unit of the 376th Bombardment Group, departed the United States on 20 May 1942 over the South Atlantic ferry route through the Caribbean and Natal, Brazil and across Central Africa and arrived at RAF Lydda in Palestine. However, before the group could depart for India and begin attacks on Japanese targets from a base located in China, the unit learned that its proposed base in China had been captured by Japanese forces.

The United States Army Air Forces first dropped bombs on Romania on 12 June 1942, one week after the U.S. Congress declared war on Romania, during the Halverson project (HALPRO) raid against Ploiești – the first U.S. mission against a European target. Thirteen B-24 Liberator heavy bombers under the command of Colonel Harry A. Halverson from RAF Fayid, Egypt, dropped eight bombs into the Black Sea, two onto Constanța, six onto Ploiești, six onto Teișani, and several onto Ciofliceni. In all, three people were killed and damage was minor. Halverson would be awarded the Silver Star for leading the Ploesti raid.

To make matters worse, the German Afrika Korps under General Erwin Rommel was poised to attack Allied forces in Egypt. HALPRO was quickly diverted from its original mission to a new one again: interdictory raids from airfields in Egypt against shipping and North African ports supporting Axis operations as part of United States Middle East Air Forces (USMEAF) on 20 June 1942, a quickly assembled organization based in Cairo. The Halverson Project was dissolved and the organization was renamed the 1st Provisional Bombardment Group. Halvorsen returned to the U.S. in August.

As early as 7 September, Ninth Air Force commander Maj. Gen. Lewis H. Brereton sought to have the 1st Provisional Bomb Group assigned a tactical designation and number, and a formal table of organization and equipment to make it a permanent organization. At the same time, the U.S. and British had reached an understanding with the Soviets about establishing an Anglo-American air force in the Transcaucasus to protect its flank in the Middle East. The American contribution was to be one troop carrier group and one "highly mobile" heavy bomber group. Gen. George C. Marshall on 11 October ordered Brereton to create the 376th Bombardment Group, composed of a headquarters squadron and four tactical squadrons, the 512th, 513th, 514th and 515th Bombardment Squadrons, intended for the Transcaucasus assignment. The group was constituted on 19 October and activated at midnight 31 October from personnel and equipment of the 1st Provisional Group. The first commander was Col. George F. McGuire, who took charge of the provisional group when Halverson returned to the United States in August 1942. After several weeks, the Soviets declared that they wanted only the aircraft and not British or American crews. None could be spared and the Anglo-American air force proposal was cancelled.

Members of the 376th adopted the nickname "Liberandos". Initially, the 376th was formed with the 23 B-24Ds which had flown from Florida, along with a detachment of Boeing B-17D Flying Fortresses from the 7th Bombardment Group and other personnel. Some of the B-17s were Pearl Harbor attack and Philippines campaign survivors, which had been assigned to the China Burma India Theater. After the Japanese capture of Burma, the Burma Road was cut so the detachment could not be logistically supported in China. By the end of 1942, all of the squadrons were equipped with B-24 Liberators as the older model B-17s were reassigned to non-combat roles.

Operating from bases in Palestine, Egypt, Libya and Tunisia, the 376th attacked shipping in the Mediterranean and harbor installations in Libya, Tunisia, Sicily, and Italy to cut enemy supply lines to North Africa. It struck airfields, marshalling yards, and other objectives in Sicily and Italy after the fall of Tunisia in May 1943. It received a Distinguished Unit Citation for action against the enemy in the Middle East, North Africa, and Sicily, November 1942 – August 1943. Participated in the famed Operation Tidal Wave, the low-level assault on oil refineries at Ploiești and received another DUC: nearing Ploiești on 1 August 1943 and realizing that it was off course, the group attempted to reach its assigned objective from another direction; by that time, however, enemy defenses were thoroughly alerted and intense opposition forced the 376th to divert to targets of opportunity in the general target area.

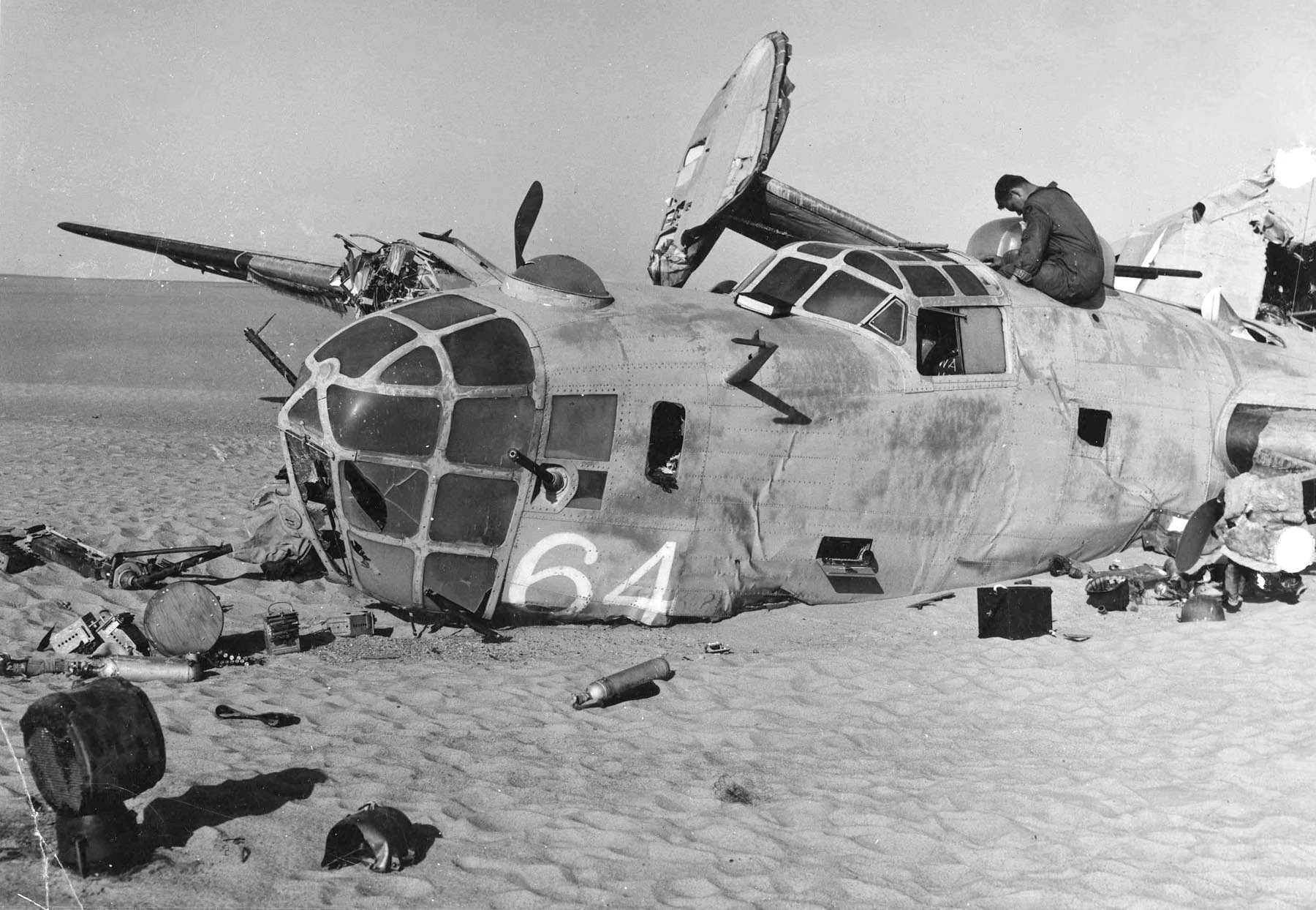
Wreckage of the 376th Bomb Group B-24D Liberator "Lady Be Good" (41-24301) when found in the Libyan Desert, November 1958

On 9 November 1958, British geologists flying over the Libyan Desert spotted an aircraft resting on the sand dunes approximately 400 statute miles (640 km) south of Benghazi, Libya. A ground party reached the site in March 1959 and discovered the plane to be the "Lady Be Good", a B-24D Liberator of the 514th Bombardment Squadron. The bomber had disappeared after a 4 April 1943 attack against Naples, Italy. In 1960, the remains of eight airmen were found; the body of the ninth crewman was never found.

With the move of Ninth Air Force to England in 1943, the 376th was reassigned to Fifteenth Air Force and moved to San Pancrazio Salentino, Italy under the 47th Bombardment Wing. From Italian bases, the unit engaged primarily in long-range missions to targets in Italy, France, Germany, Czechoslovakia, Austria, Hungary, and the Balkans to bomb factories, marshalling yards, oil refineries, oil storage facilities, airdromes, bridges, harbors, and other objectives.

It received a third Distinguished Unit Citation for attacking the oil industry at Bratislava on 16 June 1944. Also flew support and interdiction missions, assisting Allied forces at Anzio and Monte Cassino during February–March 1944, supporting Operation Dragoon, the Invasion of Southern France in August 1944, aiding the Russian sweep into the Balkans during the fall of 1944, and assisting Allied troops in northern Italy during April 1945.

Flying from North Africa and Italy, the Group flew 451 missions, was awarded three Distinguished Unit Citations and earned 15 campaign awards. The Liberandos destroyed 220 enemy aircraft in aerial combat and suffered casualties totaling 1479 officers and enlisted personnel and 169 aircraft.

With the end of the war in Europe, the 376th moved to Harvard Army Air Field, Nebraska, on 8 May 1945, became a very heavy group and began Boeing B-29 Superfortress transition training in preparation for a move to the Asiatic-Pacific Theater. However, with the end of the war in August, the training ended and the unit was inactivated at Grand Island Army Air Field, Nebraska on 10 November 1945.

=== Weather reconnaissance ===
The unit was redesignated the 376th Reconnaissance Group and activated at Gravelly Point, Virginia on 23 May 1947. The wartime 512th and 513th Squadrons were assigned to the group and equipped with B/WB-29s. The unit operated as a weather reconnaissance group until its inactivation on 20 September 1948.

=== Strategic Air Command ===
The unit once again became a bombardment unit and was activated under Strategic Air Command in 1951. However, Strategic Air Command was conducting a test of assigning its tactical squadrons directly to its wings, and the group's personnel were detached to wing headquarters. When the new organization became permanent in June 1952, the group was inactivated.

=== Global War on Terrorism ===
Manas Air Base operations began 16 December 2001 and included the 86th Contingency Response Group from Ramstein Air Base, Germany as well as contractors and French engineers. Since then it has hosted forces from Australia, Denmark, France, Italy, New Zealand, Norway, South Korea, Spain and the Netherlands. Coalition aircraft previously based here have included tankers (KC-135s), tactical airlift (C-130s), fighters (F-18, F-16, Mirage 2000) and helicopters (Super Puma).

== Lineage ==
- Constituted as the 376th Bombardment Group (Heavy) on 19 October 1942

Activated on 31 October 1942
Redesignated 376th Bombardment Group, Heavy on 3 May 1944
Redesignated 376th Bombardment Group, Very Heavy on 18 May 1945
Inactivated on 10 November 1945

- Redesignated 376th Reconnaissance Group

Activated on 23 May 1947
Inactivated on 20 September 1948

- Redesignated 376th Bombardment Group, Medium and activated on 1 June 1951

Inactivated on 16 June 1952

- Redesignated 376th Expeditionary Operations Group and converted to provisional status on 4 December 2001. Assigned to Air Combat Command to activate or inactivate as needed

Activated on 21 December 2001
Inactivated c. 3 June 2014

=== Assignments ===
- Bomber Command, Middle East Air Forces, 31 October 1942
- IX Bomber Command, November 1942
- 5th Bombardment Wing, 26 September 1943
- 47th Bombardment Wing, 17 November 1943 – 19 April 1945
- Second Air Force, 8 May-10 November 1945
- Air Weather Service, 23 May 1947 – 20 September 1948
- 376th Bombardment Wing, 1 June 1951 – 16 June 1952
- Air Combat Command to activate or inactivate at any time after 4 December 2001

376th Air Expeditionary Wing, 21 December 2001 – c. 3 June 2014

=== Components ===
- 512th Bombardment Squadron (later 512th Reconnaissance Squadron, 512th Bombardment Squadron), 31 October 1942 – 10 November 1945; 23 May 1947 – 20 September 1948; 1 June 1951 – 16 June 1952 (attached to 376th Bombardment Wing)
- 513th Bombardment Squadron (later 513th Reconnaissance Squadron, 513th Bombardment Squadron), 31 October 1942 – 10 November 1945; 23 May 1947 – 20 September 1948; 1 June 1951 – 16 June 1952 (attached to 376th Bombardment Wing)
- 514th Bombardment Squadron (later 514th Reconnaissance Squadron, 514th Bombardment Squadron), 31 October 1942 – 10 November 1945; 23 May 1947 – 20 September 1948; 1 June 1951 – 16 June 1952 (attached to 376th Bombardment Wing)
- 515th Bombardment Squadron, 31 October 1942 – 10 November 1945

=== Stations ===
- RAF Lydda, Palestine, 31 October 1942
- RAF Abu Sueir, Egypt, 8 November 1942
- RAF Gambut, Libya, c. January 1943
- Soluch Airfield, Libya, 22 February 1943
- Benina Airport, Libya, c. 6 April 1943
- Enfidaville Airfield, Tunisia, 26 September 1943
- San Pancrazio Airfield, Italy, c. 17 November 1943 – 19 April 1945
- Harvard Army Air Field, Nebraska, 8 May 1945
- Grand Island Army Air Field, Nebraska, 25 June – 10 November 1945
- Gravelly Point, Virginia, 23 May 1947 – 20 September 1948
- Forbes Air Force Base, Kansas, 1 June 1951
- Barksdale Air Force Base, Louisiana, 10 October 1951 – 16 June 1952
- Transit Center at Manas, Kyrgyz Republic, 21 December 2001 – c. 3 June 2014

== Aircraft ==
- B-17D Flying Fortress, 1942
- B-24 Liberator, 1942–1945
- B/WB-29 Superfortress, 1947–1948
- From since 2001, supported attached transitory Air Expeditionary aircraft, including C-17 Globemaster III and KC-135 Stratotanker.

== See also ==
- List of B-29 Superfortress operators
