= St. George's-Stephenville East =

Former provincial electoral district in Newfoundland and Labrador, Canada

Newfoundland and Labrador electoral district
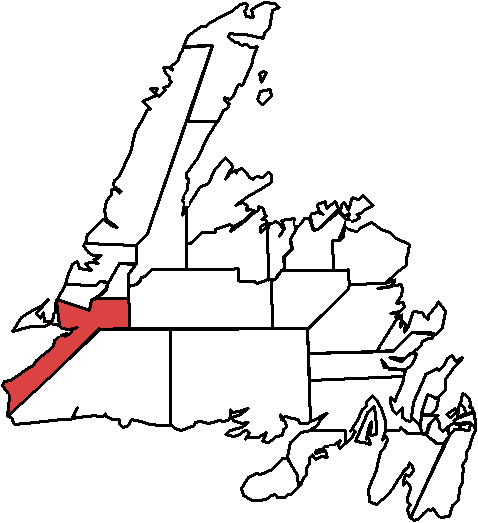
- St. George's-Stephenville East in relation to other districts in Newfoundland

Defunct provincial electoral district
- Legislature: Newfoundland and Labrador House of Assembly
- District created: 1995
- First contested: 1996
- Last contested: 2014

Demographics
- Population (2006): 10,878
- Electors (2011): 7,861
- Census division(s): Division No. 3, Division No. 4, Division No. 5
- Census subdivision(s): Division No. 3, Subd. H, Division No. 4, Subd. A, Division No. 4, Subd. B, Division No. 4, Subd. C, Division No. 4, Subd. D, Division No. 5, Subd. A, Division No. 5, Subd. C, Gallants, Stephenville, Stephenville Crossing, St. George's

St. George's-Stephenville East is a defunct provincial electoral district for the House of Assembly of Newfoundland and Labrador, Canada. It was created in 1995 from the districts of St. George's and Stephenville. In 2011, there were 7,861 eligible voters living within the district.

The district runs the length of Bay St. George (excluding Port au Port Peninsula) and all along the district of Humber West. Apart from parts of Stephenville, the district includes communities of Barachois Brook, Benoit's Siding, Black Duck Siding, Cape Anguille, Cartyville, Coal Brook, Codroy, Codroy Pond, Cold Brook, Doyles, Flat Bay, Great Codroy, Gypsumville, Heatherton, Highlands, Jeffrey's, Journois Brook, Loch Leven, Loch Lomond, Maidstone, Mattis Point, McDougals, McKay's, Millville, Noels Pond, O'Regan's, Red Rocks, Robinsons, Robinson's Station, St. Andrew, St. David's, St. Fintan's, St. George's, St. Teresa, St. Teresa's Station, Searston, South Branch, Stephenville Crossing, The Block, Tompkins, Upper Ferry, and Woodville.

The district was abolished in 2015, and was succeeded by the new district of Stephenville-Port au Port.

== Members of the House of Assembly ==
=== St. George's-Stephenville East/Stephenville ===
Member	Party	Term
Scott Reid	Liberal	2014–2015
Joan Shea (Burke)	Progressive Conservative	2003–2014
Kevin Aylward	Liberal	1985–2003
Fred Stagg	Progressive Conservative	1979–1985
William MacNeil	Liberal	1975–1979

=== St. George's/ St. Georges-Port-au-port ===
Member	Party	Term
Bud Hulan	Liberal	1993–1996
Larry Short	Liberal	1989–1993
Ron Dawe	Progressive Conservative	1979–1989
Hazel McIsaac	Liberal	1975–1979
Alexander Dunphy	Progressive Conservative	1971–1975
William J. Keough	Liberal	1949–1971

== Election results ==
By-election August 26, 2014 On the resignation of Joan Shea, June 2, 2014
Party	Candidate	Votes	%	±%
Liberal	Scott Reid	2211	59.15	+26.43
Progressive Conservative	Wally Childs	948	25.36	-23.95
NDP	Bernice Hancock	579	15.49	-1.03
Total valid votes		3,739		
Rejected				
Turnout				
Liberal gain from Progressive Conservative		Swing		+25.19

2011 Newfoundland and Labrador general election
Party	Candidate	Votes	%	±%
Progressive Conservative	Joan Burke	2,104	49.31	-25.44
Liberal	Kevin Aylward	1,396	32.72	+7.46
NDP	Bernice Hancock	705	16.52	N/A
Independent	Dean Simon	62	1.45	N/A
Total valid votes		4,267		
Rejected		20	0.47	-0.05
Turnout		4,287	53.86	-4.99
Progressive Conservative hold		Swing		-16.45

2007 Newfoundland and Labrador general election
Party	Candidate	Votes	%	±%
Progressive Conservative	Joan Burke	3,143	74.74	+22.11
Liberal	George Lee	1,062	25.26	-19.05
Total valid votes		4,205		
Rejected		22	0.52	+0.18
Turnout		4,227	58.86	-11.38
Progressive Conservative hold		Swing		+20.58

2003 Newfoundland and Labrador general election
Party	Candidate	Votes	%	±%
Progressive Conservative	Joan Burke	2,927	52.63	+12.43
Liberal	Ron Dawe	2,464	44.31	-8.35
Independent	Nancy Critchley	170	3.06	
Total valid votes		5,561		
Rejected		19	0.34	-0.07
Turnout		5,580	70.23	+13.98
Progressive Conservative gain from Liberal		Swing		+10.39

1999 Newfoundland and Labrador general election
Party	Candidate	Votes	%	±%
Liberal	Kevin Aylward	2,546	52.66	-9.02
Progressive Conservative	Leonard Muise	1,944	40.21	+11.35
Newfoundland and Labrador First	Dave Johnson	345	7.14	–
Total valid votes		4,835		
Rejected		20	0.41	+0.17
Turnout		4,855	56.26	-9.76
Liberal hold		Swing		-10.18

1996 Newfoundland and Labrador general election
Party	Candidate	Votes	%	±%
Liberal	Kevin Aylward	3,505	61.68	
Progressive Conservative	Cec Stein	1,650	28.86	–
Independent	Roy Spencer	538	9.47	–
Total valid votes		5,683		
Rejected		14	0.25	
Turnout		5,697	66.01	

== See also ==
- List of Newfoundland and Labrador provincial electoral districts
- Canadian provincial electoral districts
