= Newfoundland and Labrador Route 407 =

Highway in Newfoundland and Labrador, Canada

Route 407
- St. Andrew's-Searston Road

Route information
- Maintained by Newfoundland and Labrador Department of Transportation and Infrastructure
- Length: 15.6 km (9.7 mi)

Major junctions
- South end: Route 1 (TCH) at Tompkins
- North end: Route 406 at Millville

Location
- Country: Canada
- Province: Newfoundland and Labrador

Highway system
- Highways in Newfoundland and Labrador
← Route 406	→ Route 408

Route 407, also known as St. Andrew's-Searston Road, is a minor highway on the western portion of Newfoundland in the Canadian province of Newfoundland and Labrador. The route's southern terminus is the Trans-Canada Highway (Route 1) in the community of Tompkins, and its northern terminus is in the community of Millville, at an intersection with Route 406 (Codroy Road). Along with Route 406, Route 407 allows for an extensive view of the Codroy Valley.

== Route description ==
Route 407 begins at an intersection with Route 1 (Trans-Canada Highway) and heads southwest along the banks of the Little Codroy River to pass through St. Andrew's, where it makes a sharp right turn at an intersection with a local road leading to the St. Andrews (Codroy Valley) Airport (not a scheduled destination). The highway passes northwest through farmland to have an intersection with a local road leading to Loch Lomond before passing through Searston. Route 407 now crosses the mouth of the Codroy River and passes through Codroy Valley Provincial Park before entering Millville and coming to an end at an intersection with Route 406 (Codroy Road).

== Major intersections ==
Location	km	mi	Destinations	Notes
Tompkins	0.0	0.0	Route 1 (TCH) – Corner Brook, Port aux Basques	Southern terminus
St. Andrew's	4.9	3.0	Radio Range Road (Route 407-10) - St. Andrews (Codroy Valley) Airport (not a scheduled destination)	
	6.6	4.1	Loch Lomond Road (Route 407-12) - Loch Lomond	
Searston	11.7	7.3	Block Road (Route 407-13) - Upper Ferry	
Millville	15.6	9.7	Route 406 (Codroy Road) to Route 1 (TCH) – Codroy, Great Codroy, Upper Ferry	Northern terminus
1.000 mi = 1.609 km; 1.000 km = 0.621 mi

== Attractions along Route 407 ==
- Codroy Valley Provincial Park
