= Newfoundland and Labrador Route 406 =

Highway in Newfoundland and Labrador, Canada

Route 406
- Codroy Road

Route information
- Maintained by Newfoundland and Labrador Department of Transportation and Infrastructure
- Length: 21.2 km (13.2 mi)

Major junctions
- East end: Route 1 (TCH) in Doyles
- Route 407 in Millville
- West end: Cape Anguille

Location
- Country: Canada
- Province: Newfoundland and Labrador

Highway system
- Highways in Newfoundland and Labrador
← Route 405	→ Route 407

Route 406, also known as Codroy Road, is a highway on the western portion of Newfoundland in the Canadian province of Newfoundland and Labrador. It is a relatively short route, with its eastern terminus at Route 1 (Trans-Canada Highway) in the community of Doyles, and its western terminus at Cape Anguille. The route travels through the scenic Codroy Valley region.

== Route description ==
Route 406 begins at an intersection with Route 1 (Trans-Canada Highway) in Doyles and heads west along the banks of the Codroy River to pass through Upper Ferry, where it has an intersection with a local road leading to Searston and Loch Lomond, as well as cross a bridge over the river. The highway makes a sharp left at an intersection with a local road leading to O'Regan's to follow the northern banks of the river westward through Great Codroy and Millville, where it has an intersection with Route 407 (St. Andrew's-Searston Road). Route 406 begins fill the coastline of the Gulf of St. Lawrence as it heads northwest through Woodville, Codroy, and the community of Cape Anguille, with provincial maintenance coming to shortly after meeting a road to the point of Cape Anguille and the Cape Anguille Lighthouse.

== Major intersections ==
Location	km	mi	Destinations	Notes
Doyles	0.0	0.0	Route 1 (TCH) – Corner Brook, Port aux Basques	Eastern terminus
Upper Ferry	4.6	2.9	Searston Road (Route 407-12) - Searston, Loch Lomond	
Great Codroy	5.9	3.7	O'Regan's Road (Route 406-13) - O'Regan's	
Millville	13.6	8.5	Route 407 south (St. Andrew's-Searston Road) – Searston	Northern terminus of Route 407
Cape Anguille	20.7	12.9	Lighthouse Road - Point of Cape Anguille, Cape Anguille Lighthouse	
Cape Anguille	21.2	13.2	Codroy Road	End of provincial maintenance; western terminus; road continues north as Codroy Road (in gravel)
1.000 mi = 1.609 km; 1.000 km = 0.621 mi

== Attractions along Route 406 ==
- Cape Anguille Lighthouse
