= Bay St. George South =

Local service district in Newfoundland and Labrador

Coordinates: 48.213°N 58.833°W

Location of Bay St. George South in Newfoundland and Labrador

Bay St. George South is a local service district and designated place in the Canadian province of Newfoundland and Labrador on the south coast of Bay St. George, a large bay on the west coast of the island of Newfoundland. Bay St. George South consists nine communities, namely Heatherton, Robinsons, Cartyville, McKay's, Jeffrey's, St. David's, St. Fintan's, Lock Leven en Highlands.

In 2016 the local service district had 1,103 inhabitants.

== Geography ==
Bay St. George South is in Newfoundland within Subdivision B of Division No. 4.

== Demographics ==
As a designated place in the 2016 Census of Population conducted by Statistics Canada, Bay St. George South recorded a population of 1103 living in 541 of its 819 total private dwellings, a change of −10.3% from its 2011 population of 1229. With a land area of 120.64 km^{2} (46.58 sq mi), it had a population density of 9.1/km^{2} (23.7/sq mi) in 2016.

== Government ==
Bay St. George South is a local service district (LSD) that is governed by a committee responsible for the provision of certain services to the community. The chair of the LSD committee is Theresa Gillam.

== See also ==
- List of communities in Newfoundland and Labrador
- List of designated places in Newfoundland and Labrador
- List of local service districts in Newfoundland and Labrador
