= Newfoundland and Labrador Route 404 =

Highway in Newfoundland and Labrador, Canada

Route 404

Route information
- Maintained by Newfoundland and Labrador Department of Transportation and Infrastructure
- Length: 15.6 km (9.7 mi)

Major junctions
- West end: Route 1 (TCH) near Jeffrey's
- East end: Route 1 (TCH) in Robinsons

Location
- Country: Canada
- Province: Newfoundland and Labrador

Highway system
- Highways in Newfoundland and Labrador
← Route 403	→ Route 405

Route 404 is a short provincial highway on the west coast of Newfoundland in the Canadian province of Newfoundland and Labrador. It is one of four provincial routes that start and end at the same route (in this case, the Trans-Canada Highway/Route 1) - the only other such provincial highways are Route 201, Route 213 and Route 351. When exiting the Trans-Canada Highway at the east access, the route starts several kilometres south of Robinsons and ends at the Trans-Canada Highway several kilometres south of Jeffrey's.

== Route description ==
Route 404 begins on Route 1 (TCH) in a very rural area and it heads through wooded terrain for several kilometres. It enters Jeffrey's, where it makes a sharp right at an intersection with a local road leading to St. David's and Maidstone. The highway now follows the coastline as it heads northeast through McKay's. Route 404 crosses the Barachois River to pass through Cartyville before crossing the Robinsons River into Robinsons. It passes through town, where it makes a sharp right at an intersection with a local road leading to Heatherton, before heading eastward through inland terrain for several kilometres to come to an end at another intersection with Route 1.

== Major intersections ==
Location	km	mi	Destinations	Notes
	0.0	0.0	Route 1 (TCH) – Corner Brook, Port aux Basques	Western terminus
Jeffrey's	5.1	3.2	Jeffrey's Road (Route 405-12) - St. David's, Maidstone	
Robinsons	10.4	6.5	Robinsons Road (Route 404-14) - Heatherton, Fischells	
Robinsons	15.6	9.7	Route 1 (TCH) – Corner Brook, Port aux Basques	Eastern terminus
1.000 mi = 1.609 km; 1.000 km = 0.621 mi
