= South Branch, Newfoundland and Labrador =

South Branch
- Settlement
- South Branch-Coal Brook
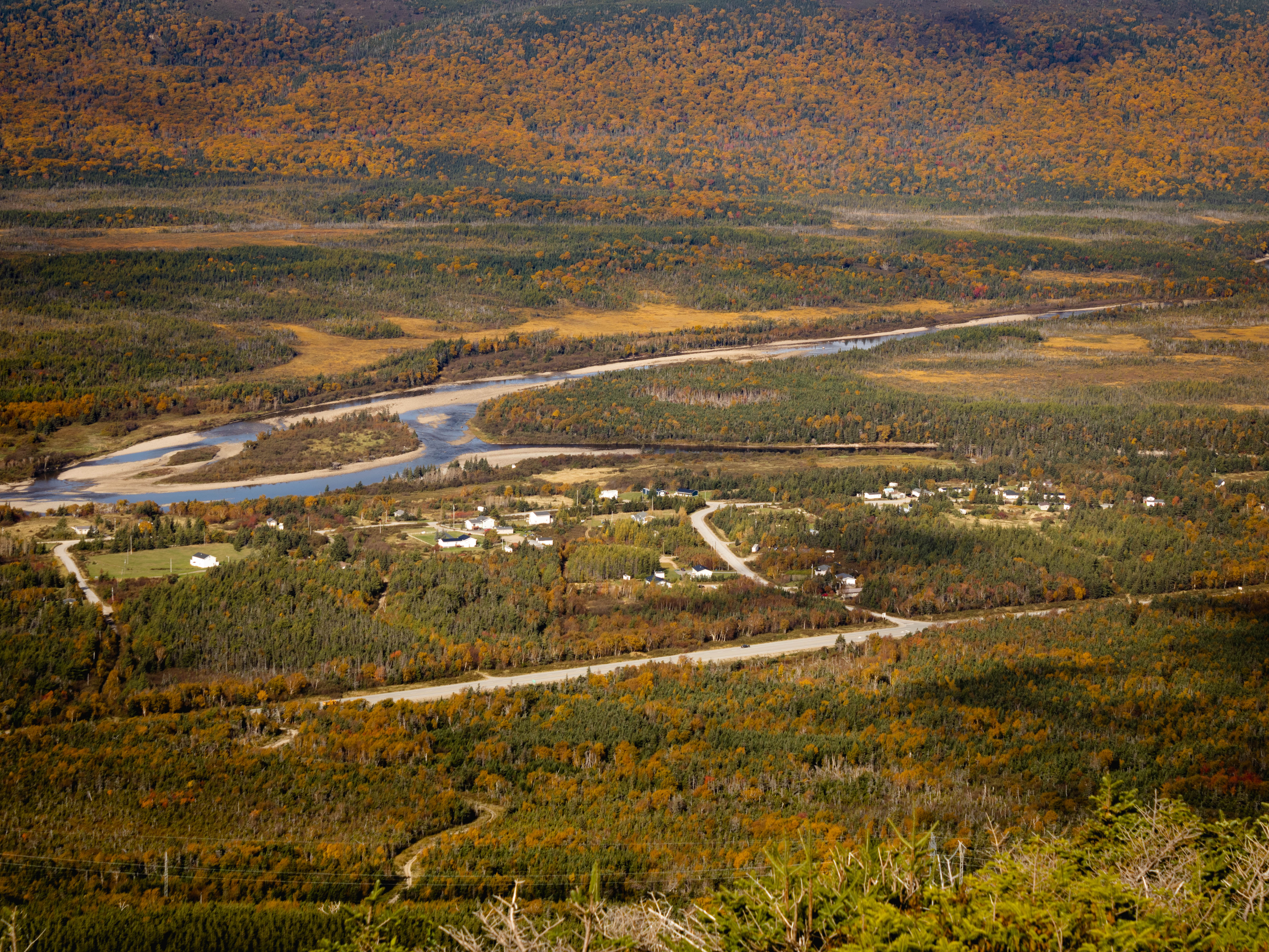

- Location within Newfoundland Location within Newfoundland and Labrador
- Coordinates: 47.911°N 59.029°W
- Country: Canada
- Province: Newfoundland and Labrador
- Census division: Division No. 4, Subdivision A

Population (2021)
  - Total: 178
- Time zone: UTC-3:30 (Newfoundland Time)
  - Summer (DST): UTC-2:30 (Newfoundland Daylight)
- Area code: 709
- Highways: Route 1 (TCH)

South Branch is a settlement located on the west coast of the island of Newfoundland in the province of Newfoundland and Labrador, Canada. South Branch is one of fifteen communities within the greater Codroy Valley area and is located alongside the Trans-Canada Highway (Route 1) between Channel-Port aux Basques and St. George's Bay.

== History of South Branch ==
While having the land farmed as early as 1835, South Branch began as a settlement around 1895 when the Newfoundland Railway came through the southwest coast of Newfoundland. The earliest settlements were near the river and railway as travel was mostly by boat or train at the time. South Branch first appeared in the Census 1901 with a population of 19, by 1911, the population grew to 135. Most of the people in South Branch were farmers, with logging and guiding as additional sources of income, with logging becoming the main source of income by the 1940's. The first logging truck came to South Branch in 1949, it was a Canadian Military Pattern truck surplus vehicle from World War II.

The South Branch Social Club began as a high school, with an addition being built on later for primary & elementary students. The school closed in 1970 and all students were bussed to Codroy Valley from there on out. After its closure it was used as a Social Club ever since, with a closure and reopening & rebranding to the South Branch Social Club in the early 1990s. The South Branch Social Club hosted the first South Branch Come Home Year in 2004.

Before the Trans-Canada Highway starting as a dirt road in 1953, and paved along South Branch in 1966 with the final passenger run for the railway passing South Branch on July 2nd, 1969 the new highway travel brought more visitors to South Branch, various stores, pool halls, theaters, filling stations, bed and breakfast and cabin rentals opened and closed for many decades after this.

== History of Coal Brook ==
The Coal Brook gets its name from a 5 inch coal seam that was discovered along a brook 5 and a half kilometers north of South Branch by the Reid Company, who were constructing the railway at the time. After this discovery a coal mine was set up in Coal Brook, approximately one hundred tons of coal was mined for use on the railway in the 1890s however the project was abandoned after low yield. The coal mine reopened again in 1918, after five hundred tons being mined it was closed again, until 1946 when it was reopened again, mining six hundred more tons and then closed for the final time in 1947. Today, remnants of the mine exist including parts of rails, mine carts, collapsed mine shafts and boilers can be found where the mine once stood.

With increased cultivation in South Branch new residents were forced to move north, moving from South Branch to Coal Brook. Like South Branch, it had good soil for farming with people settling near the river and railway. In the 1930s and 1940s logging and railway work became the most prominent source of income for people living in Coal Brook, by 1981 logging had become the most prominent, followed by the closure of the railway in 1989.

Coal Brook had two of its own schools which existed at different time periods, the second one closing in 1966 in favor of sending students to South Branch instead. Much like South Branch, Coal Brook had stores, rental cabins, bed and breakfast and theaters opened and closed over the years.

== Attractions ==
The South Branch Social Club is a social club and community centre which often hosts recreational activities such as card games, darts and live music often featuring local talent. The social club also hosts breakfast and brunch on special occasions such as on Mother's Day and Father's Day as well as other fundraising events.

The Social Club is often the starting point of the snowmobile poker run which takes place in February, during the yearly Codroy Valley Winter Carnival.

South Branch is in direct access to both Area 9 and Area 10 for hunting moose, when in season.

South Branch has an abundance of hiking trails such as Johns Falls and the Sgt. Craig Gillam Mark Rock Trail.

The Newfoundland T'Railway which goes across much of the province runs directly through South Branch and is a very popular trail for touring on all-terrain vehicles.

== Demographics ==
Historical population
Year	Pop.	±%
1986	400	—
1991	373	−6.8%
1996	342	−8.3%
2001	252	−26.3%
2006	235	−6.7%
2011	238	+1.3%
2016	190	−20.2%
2021	178	−6.3%

In the 2021 Census of Population conducted by Statistics Canada, South Branch together with nearby Coal Brook had a population of 178, a change of −5.7% from its 2016 population of 190. Since 2006 all census data for South Branch has also included the nearby settlement of Coal Brook.

In 1945 the population for Coal Brook was 30, in 1951 it was 71, in 1960 it was 146, in 1976 it was 169 and in 2004 it was 85.

== Photos ==
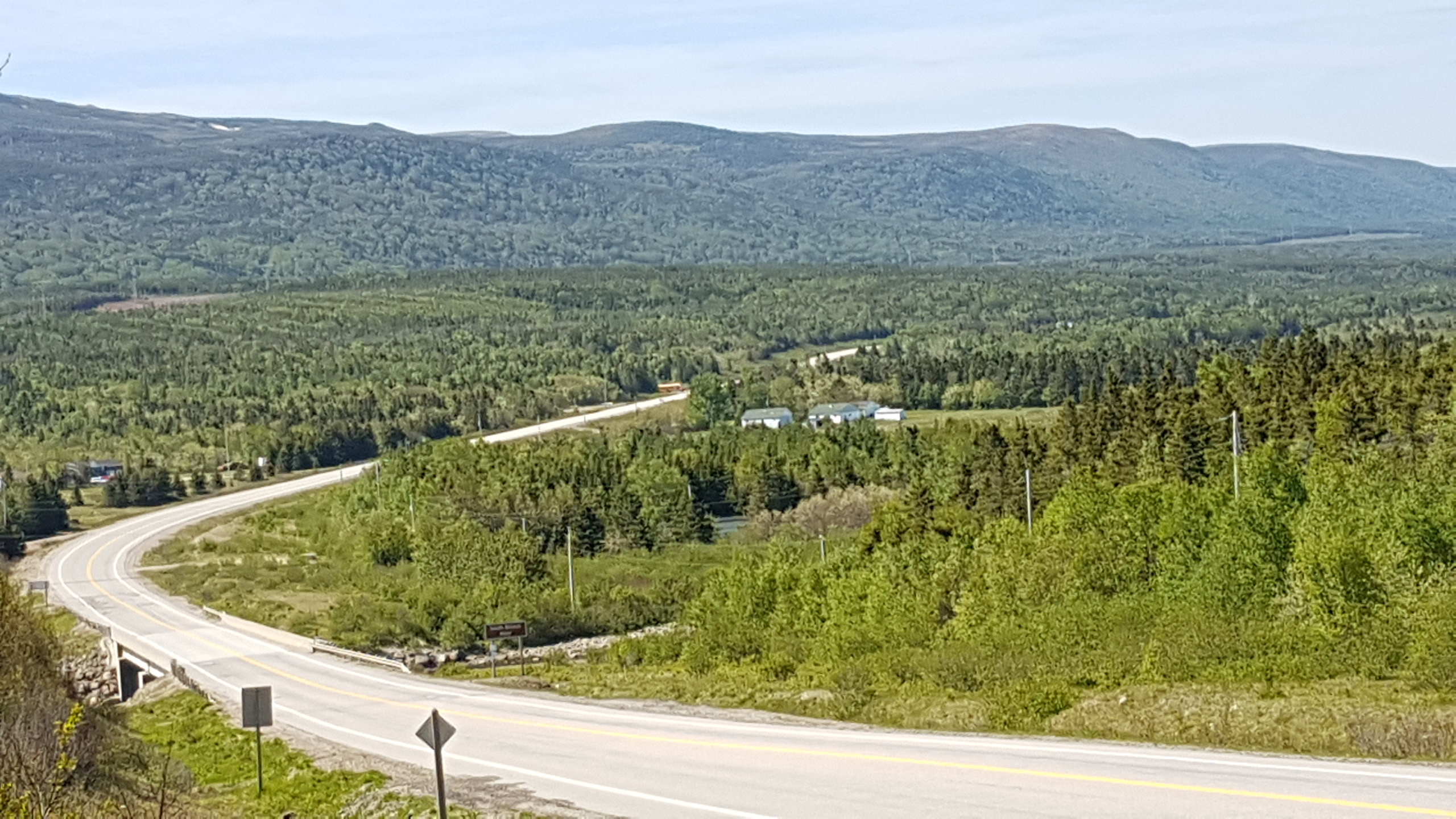
Coal Brook, southbound.

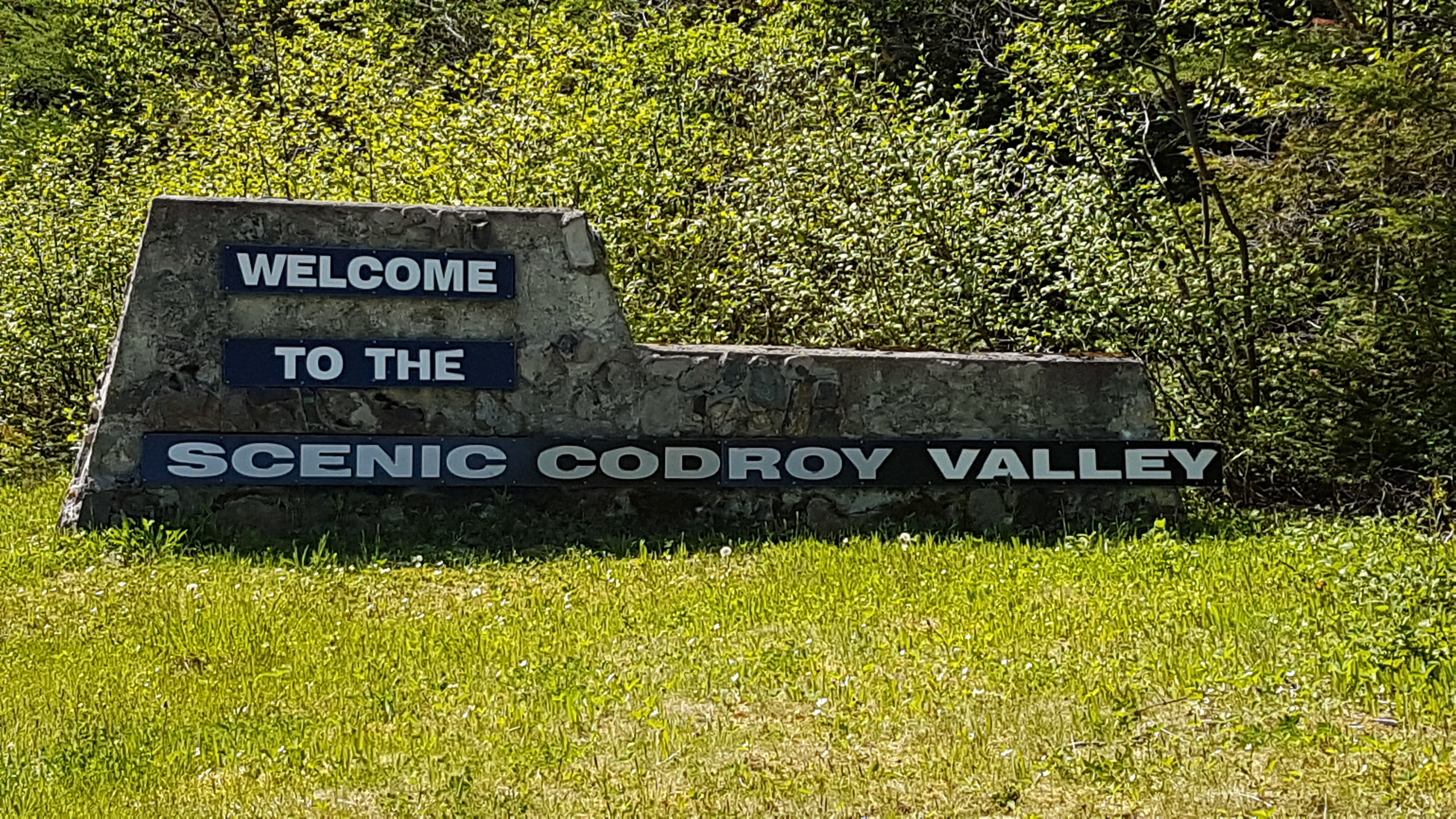
Welcome sign just before Coal Brook.

== See also ==
- List of cities and towns in Newfoundland and Labrador
- Division No. 4, Subdivision A, Newfoundland and Labrador
- Codroy
- Millville, Newfoundland and Labrador
- St. Andrew's, Newfoundland and Labrador
- Upper Ferry, Newfoundland and Labrador
