= Newfoundland and Labrador Route 405 =

Highway in Canada

Route 405
- Highlands Road

Route information
- Maintained by Newfoundland and Labrador Department of Transportation and Infrastructure
- Length: 18.0 km (11.2 mi)

Major junctions
- East end: Route 1 (TCH) at Crabbes River Park
- West end: Highlands

Location
- Country: Canada
- Province: Newfoundland and Labrador

Highway system
- Highways in Newfoundland and Labrador
← Route 404	→ Route 406

Route 405, also known as Highlands Road, is a 18.0-kilometre-long (11.2 mi) minor highway in the western region of Newfoundland in the Canadian province of Newfoundland and Labrador. The highway begins at a junction with Route 1 (Trans-Canada Highway) and continues to its west terminus, the community of Highlands.

== Route description ==
Route 405 begins at an intersection with Route 1 directly across the Crabbes River from Crabbes River Park. The highway heads northwestward through rural areas, paralleling the Crabbes River, to pass through St. Fintan's, where it makes a sharp left at an intersection with a local road leading to St. David's and Maidstone. Route 405 now heads southwest to cross the Highlands River and pass through Loch Leven to turn north and parallel the Highlands River for several kilometres. The highway makes another sharp left as it begins following the coastline and passes through Highlands. Provincial maintenance for Route 405 ends at the southern tip of the community, with the road continuing southward for several kilometres as a gravel road.

== Major intersections ==
Location	km	mi	Destinations	Notes
	0.0	0.0	Route 1 (TCH) – Corner Brook, Port aux Basques	Eastern terminus
St. Fintan's	5.6	3.5	Main Road (Route 405-11) - St. David's, Maidstone	
Highlands	18.0	11.2	Main Road	End of provincial maintenance; western terminus; road continues south as Main Road
1.000 mi = 1.609 km; 1.000 km = 0.621 mi
