= Ann Hulan =

Colonist, entrepreneur, experimental farmer

Ann Searle Hulan (c. 1756 – 27 September 1848) was an early Newfoundland colonist, entrepreneur, experimental farmer, and regional matriarch.

== Early life ==
Tradition is uncertain on Hulan's origins, claiming variously that she was born in Conception Bay, or Fortune Bay, or on Jersey. One account claims she was the daughter of a couple named Searle/Serle/Cyril who had emigrated from Jersey in the Channel Islands, one possible couple being Thomas and Susannah Serle of Jersey.

A "Nannie Hulan" from the Channel Islands is said to have settled at Second Barachois River (now McKay's) in 1762. This was likely Ann Hulan, who reported to William Epps Cormack in the 1820s that she remembered James Cook's survey of St. George's Bay in 1767. Family lore claims Cook visited Ann’s home, although there is no written record of this event having occurred.

Her family's move to the area was likely precipitated by a vacuum in the local lucrative salmon fishery: French fishing fleets had left the area at the start of hostilities during the Seven Years' War in 1756.

Ann married a John (or James) Hulan in 1771. His non-Anglicized name has also been given as Jean Heulin, of St. Peter, Jersey. Hulan's husband is believed to have been lost at sea in 1811, leaving her in charge of a farm and small fish-exporting business. After his death, Ann expanded the business.

== Prisoner of war ==
During the first summer of the War of 1812, Hulan and her daughter were aboard her vessel the Industry near St. Mary's Bay when it was seized by the American privateer, the Benjamin Franklin, and escorted to New York.

During a marine court of inquiry in September that year, the determined Ann Hulan convinced commissioner Nathaniel Davis that she was not a threat to the United States and depended on the earnings from her cargo. The fiftyish widow won the investigators' hearts; Davis pleaded for her release in a letter to the American Secretary of State James Monroe, writing that Ann and her crew shouldn't be considered prisoners of war.

Following the court of enquiry, Hulan was the only person allowed to bid at her schooner's auction. She retrieved her cargo, primarily fox furs and 152 barrels of cured salmon, received a safe conduct pass from the U.S. government, and was home for Christmas.

== Business and agricultural development ==
Hulan continued to develop her business enterprises and established an extensive commercial farm, one of the first and largest on the west coast of Newfoundland, producing cheese, butter, domestic poultry, oats, barley, wheat, and potatoes.

Hulan served as the fishing admiral of Bay St. George's between 1780 and 1815. Her fur trade business included foxes, martens, otters, beavers, muskrats, bears, wolves, and hares.

In 1822, Cormack recorded multiple varieties of potatoes being grown by Ann Hulan in St George's Bay, noting her as an experimental farmer. Her work as an agriculturalist was long lasting: three of the varieties of potatoes Hulan developed were still in use up to the 1960s, including the Early Fortune, "a moist, good tasting potato," possibly named after Fortune Bay. Hulan's Early Fortune potato was reported as being grown in experimental agricultural stations in Maine by 1907 and Ohio by 1910.

== Legacy ==
In 1835, she was visited by missionary Edward Wix, who wrote, "The recollection of this cheerful old lady is unimpaired, and carries her back to the history of the island for the greater part of a century, and this a most interesting portion of the history of Newfoundland."

Hulan has been described as a notable figure in Newfoundland history and folklore, and the only female fishing admiral in Newfoundland history. The mother of approximately ten children, she was referred to as "the Queen of St. George's Bay" and "the mother of the settlements." One son, John, is believed to have been one of the first settlers of the community of St. David's.

Hulan is regarded as the progenitor of all the Huelen/Hulan families in Newfoundland, and by the twentieth century, the Hulan name was common in western Newfoundland. Journalist Don Morris noted, "There are still many families of Huelen-Hulan on the West Coast and I imagine that most of the present generation of that family can trace their roots to that singular widow of long ago – Mrs. Anne Huelen." Of her, Cormack wrote,

She is indefatigably industrious and useful, and immediately or remotely related to, or connected with, the whole population of the bay, over whom she commands a remarkable degree of material influence and respect.

In 2008, Hulan was selected to be profiled in an educational poster series on historic women entitled "Of Character: Newfoundland and Labrador."
