= Larry Short =

Canadian politician

Member of the Newfoundland House of Assembly for St. George's
- In office 20 April 1989 – 3 May 1993
- Preceded by: Ron Dawe
- Succeeded by: Bud Hulan

Personal details
- Born: June 23, 1949 (age 77) Cape Ray, Newfoundland, Canada
- Party: Liberal
- Spouse: Melina Hayden (m. 1971)
- Children: 2
- Profession: Teacher

Larry Short (born June 23, 1949) is a Canadian politician from Newfoundland and Labrador. He was the member of the Newfoundland House of Assembly (MHA) for St. George's from 1989 to 1993.

== Background ==
Short was born on June 23, 1949 in the town of Cape Ray on the southwestern coast of Newfoundland. He became a teacher in Jeffrey's after receiving his Bachelor of Arts degree in Education. Before entering the House of Assembly, Short was the president of the Newfoundland Teachers' Association (NTA) branch in Robinsons. In 1980, he was elected as the president of the St. George's Liberal Association. Short was also a director for the Western Newfoundland and Labrador Rural Development Council in 1988.

== Politics ==
Short entered provincial politics in the 1989 provincial election, when he successfully ran as the Liberal candidate in the district of St. George's. While in office, Short expressed a neutral stance on the denominational schools question, noting in 1993 that his constituents had endured "the pleasure and the pain of being part of shared schools." In the 1993 election, Short lost his party's nomination to Bud Hulan, and he unsuccessfully contested the seat as an independent candidate.

== Electoral history ==
1993 Newfoundland general election: St. George's
Party	Candidate	Votes	%	±%
Liberal	Bud Hulan	2,015	55.52	▼13.57
Progressive Conservative	Cynthia Downey	1,514	31.52	▼12.96
Independent	Larry Short	900	18.74	▼36.78
New Democratic	Harold Bennett	189	3.94	–
Independent	Hazel McIsaac	185	3.85	–
Total valid votes		4,803	99.61	
Total rejected ballots		19	0.39	
Total votes		4,822	78.48	▲0.57
Eligible voters		6,144		
Liberal hold		Swing		▼13.27

1989 Newfoundland general election: St. George's
Party	Candidate	Votes	%	±%
Liberal	Larry Short	2,647	55.52	▲16.23
Progressive Conservative	Wayne Wheeler	2,121	44.48	▼11.55
Total valid votes		4,768	99.60	
Total rejected ballots		19	0.40	
Total votes		4,787	77.91	▼0.86
Eligible voters		6,144		
Liberal gain from Progressive Conservative		Swing		▲13.89
