= Bud Hulan =

Canadian researcher and politician

The Honourable Bud Hulan ECNL

MHA For St. George's
- In office 1993–1996
- Preceded by: Larry Short
- Succeeded by: District Abolished

Minister of Fisheries, Food And Agriculture
- In office August 26, 1994 – March 14, 1996
- Preceded by: Office Established
- Succeeded by: Office Abolished

Personal details
- Born: 1941 (age 84–85)

Howard Winston "Bud" Hulan (born 1941) is an academic, researcher and former politician in Newfoundland. He represented St. George's in the Newfoundland House of Assembly from 1993 to 1996.

The 4th child and 2nd son of Albert Hulan and Annie Shears, he was born in the family home, now a provincial heritage site, at Jeffrey's and was educated at Nova Scotia Agricultural College where he earned a diploma in agriculture, at McGill University where he studied agriculture, nutrition and biochemistry, at the University of Maine where he earned a PhD in Nutritional Biochemistry and at Carleton University where he completed post-graduate studies. Hulan worked as a research scientist for Agriculture Canada in Ottawa and then transferred to the Kentville research station, where he was principal scientist. In 1989, he became coordinator for the food science program at Memorial University. Hulan was head of a provincial task force on agriculture in Newfoundland which produced its report in 1991.

He married Shirley Marguerite Tucker; the couple have four daughters.

He was elected to the Newfoundland assembly in 1993. Hulan served in the provincial cabinet as Minister of Fisheries, Food and Agriculture. He was defeated by Paul Shelley when he ran for reelection in the amalgamated riding of Baie Verte in 1996 and returned to research and teaching at Memorial University.

Hulan has also conducted research at Oregon State University, the University of Veterinary Medicine in Vienna, at the University of Ancona in Italy and at the University of Zagreb in Croatia. In 2002, he received the Annual Innovation and Leadership Award from BioEast. His research work has focused on the health benefits of Omega-3 fatty acids from marine sources and how these substances can be incorporated in foods such as chickens and eggs.

His residence in Jeffrey's, Hulan House, has been designated as a heritage structure by the Heritage Foundation of Newfoundland and Labrador.
