= Newfoundland and Labrador Route 408 =

Highway in Newfoundland and Labrador, Canada

Route 408
- Cape Ray Road

Route information
- Maintained by Newfoundland and Labrador Department of Transportation and Infrastructure
- Length: 5.9 km (3.7 mi)

Major junctions
- South end: Cape Ray Lighthouse
- North end: Route 1 (TCH) near Cape Ray

Location
- Country: Canada
- Province: Newfoundland and Labrador

Highway system
- Highways in Newfoundland and Labrador
← Route 407	→ Route 410

Route 408, also known as Cape Ray Road, is a highway on the west coast of Newfoundland in the Canadian province of Newfoundland and Labrador. The intersection at Route 1 (Trans-Canada Highway) is located roughly 17 kilometres (11 mi) northeast of Channel-Port aux Basques, a nearly 20-minute drive. Upon entering Route 408, motorists would travel only 3 kilometres (1.9 mi) before entering its only community, Cape Ray. With a total distance of 5.9 kilometres (3.7 mi) between Route 1 and its terminus, the Cape Ray Lighthouse, it may hold the distinction of being the shortest provincial route that is not a bypass nor access road. Because of its short length, plus being a rough road, the maximum speed limit is set at 50 km/h.

Near Cape Ray, was a former Canadian National Railway train station known as Red Rocks. It closed down in September 1966, supposedly following completion of the Trans-Canada Highway in Newfoundland.

== Major intersections ==
Location	km	mi	Destinations	Notes
Point of Cape Ray	0.0	0.0	End of provincial maintenance at Cape Ray Lighthouse	Southern terminus; road continues for a short distance to Gulf of St. Lawrence coastline (as gravel)
Cape Ray	3.0	1.9	Osmond Road - Osmond, J.T. Cheeseman Provincial Park	
	5.9	3.7	Route 1 (TCH) – Corner Brook, Port aux Basques	Northern terminus
1.000 mi = 1.609 km; 1.000 km = 0.621 mi
