= List of highways numbered 407 =

The following highways are numbered 407:

== Canada ==
- Manitoba Provincial Road 407
- Newfoundland and Labrador Route 407
- Ontario Highway 407

== Costa Rica ==
- National Route 407

== Iceland ==
- Route 407 (Iceland)

== Italy ==
- State road 407

== Japan ==
- Japan National Route 407

== United Kingdom ==
- A407 road (Great Britain)

== United States ==
- Florida State Road 407
- Georgia State Route 407 (unsigned designation for Interstate 285)
- Louisiana Highway 407
- Maryland Route 407
- New York:
  - New York State Route 407 (former)
  - County Route 407 (Erie County, New York)
- Pennsylvania Route 407
- Puerto Rico Highway 407
- South Dakota Highway 407
- Farm to Market Road 407
- Virginia State Route 407
- Washington State Route 407 (former)

Preceded by 406	Lists of highways 407	Succeeded by 408
