= List of highways numbered 406 =

The following highways are numbered 406:

== Canada ==
- Manitoba Provincial Road 406
- Newfoundland and Labrador Route 406
- Ontario Highway 406

== Costa Rica ==
- National Route 406

== Israel ==
- Route 406 (Israel)

== Japan ==
- Japan National Route 406

== United Kingdom ==
- North Circular Road, the top half of London's ring road from Chiswick in the West to the Woolwich Ferry in the East

== United States ==
- Florida:
  - Florida State Road 406
    - Florida State Road 406A
  - County Road 406 (Brevard County, Florida)
- Georgia State Route 406 (unsigned designation for Interstate 59)
- Louisiana Highway 406
- Maryland Route 406 (former)
- New Mexico State Road 406
- New York:
  - New York State Route 406
  - County Route 406 (Erie County, New York)
- Puerto Rico Highway 406
- Virginia State Route 406
  - Virginia State Route 406 (former)

Preceded by 405	Lists of highways 406	Succeeded by 407
