= List of highways numbered 409 =

The following highways are numbered 409:

== Canada ==
- Manitoba Provincial Road 409
- Ontario Highway 409

== Costa Rica ==
- National Route 409

== Japan ==
- Japan National Route 409

== Norway ==
- Fylkesvei 409 (Aust-Agder) Arendal-Tromøya (Norwegian National Road 409) is a single lane ringed road on Tromøy Island and connected to Tromøysundet on the mainland via Tromøy Bridge in southwest Norway.

== United States ==
- Georgia State Route 409–unsigned designation for Interstate 24
- Louisiana Highway 409
- Maryland Route 409 (former)
- New York:
  - New York State Route 409
  - New York State Route 409 (former)
  - County Route 409 (Albany County, New York)
  - County Route 409 (Erie County, New York)
- Pennsylvania Route 409
- Puerto Rico Highway 409
- Virginia State Route 409 (former)
- Washington State Route 409

| Preceded by 408 | Lists of highways 409 | Succeeded by 410 |
