= Codroy =

Community in Newfoundland and Labrador, Canada

Coordinates: 47°52′52″N 59°23′29″W

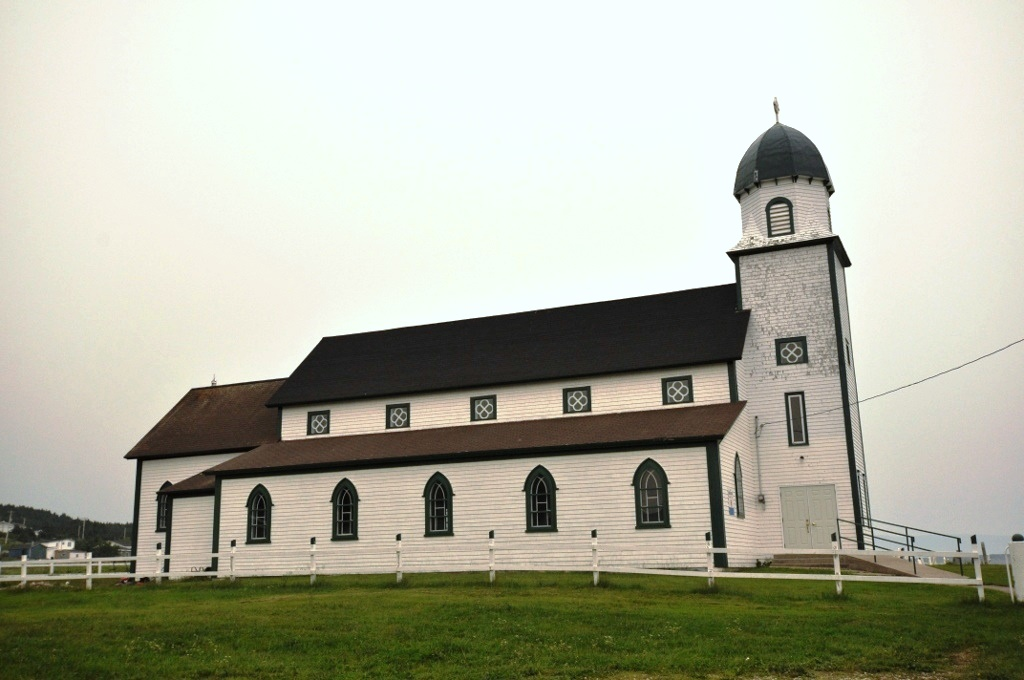
Codroy Holy Trinity Anglican Church c. 1913

Codroy is a community in the Codroy Valley of Newfoundland and Labrador, Canada.

It is a village with about 258 inhabitants, with most living in homes along Newfoundland and Labrador Route 406, the main road in the community.

== History ==
The name "Codroy" is a contraction of the French Cap de Ray, pronounced and spelled as one word ("Cadarri"). The Codroy Valley is 10 km north of Cape Ray. There were different spellings until Captain Cook surveyed the area in 1765 and named it "Cod Roy" on his map, which remained the name since.

The village was part of a settlement process that began with English, French, and Mi'kmaq settlers in the late 1700s. Between 1820s to 1840s, Acadians and Irish Catholics began to migrate to the settlement.

Codroy Island is connected to the mainland by a breakwater causeway constructed to shelter Codroy Harbour and decrease erosion of land near the coastal regions of the village.

== Attractions ==
Holy Trinity Anglican Church, a Carpenter Gothic-style wood church built in 1913 to replace the 1906 church destroyed in a wind storm in 1912, is a registered heritage structure. The church has a large cemetery with about 400 graves. Codroy remains predominantly Anglican after most surrounding area residents became Roman Catholic.

The Grand Codroy Estuary is nearby, as is Point Rosee, once thought to be a possible Norse site.

== Employers ==
Codroy Seafoods Incorporated, which processes shellfish and groundfish and exports them to other places in North America and Europe, is the largest employer. It operates a fish processing facility in Codroy Harbour.

Fishing trawlers and other fishing vessels dock in the harbour, which is maintained by Fisheries and Oceans Canada.

Other businesses in the village include Oceanview Seniors Club - a social club in the building near the harbour.

== Local services ==
Codroy Fire Hall located next to Holy Trinity Church on Holy Trinity Church Road provides fire suppression and ambulance service in the village.

There are no hospitals or clinics in Codroy, the closest medical facility is a clinic in Channel-Port aux Basques to the south.

The closest school is Belanger Memorial School, a high school in Upper Ferry, Newfoundland and Labrador.
