= Wreckhouse, Newfoundland and Labrador =

Geographic location in Newfoundland and Labrador, Canada

Coordinates: 47°43′36″N 59°18′06″W

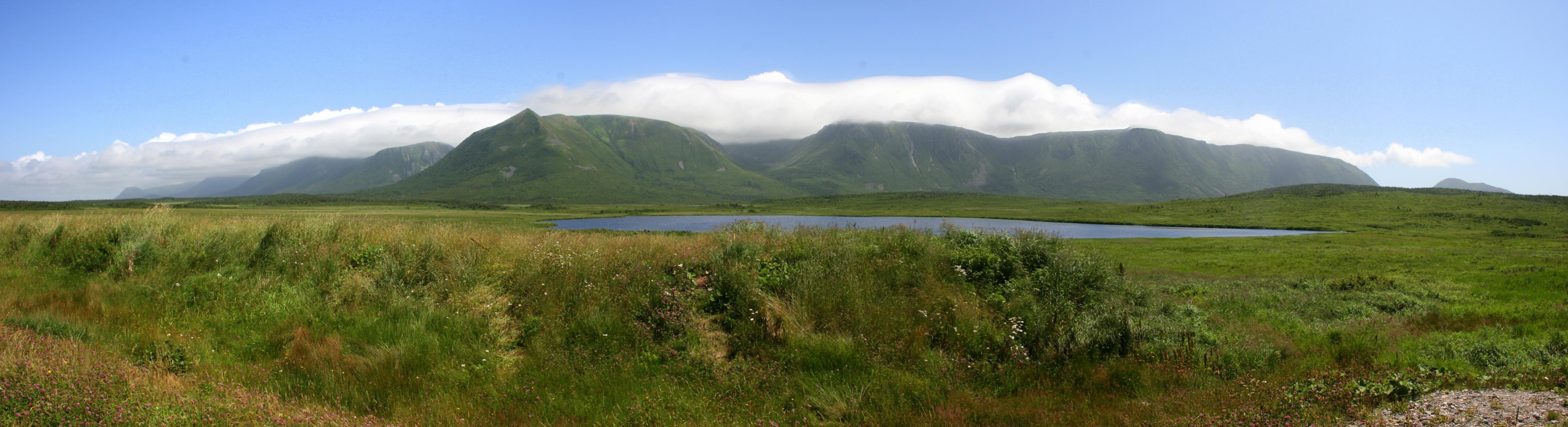
Table Mountain as seen from Wreckhouse

Wreckhouse is a geographic location in the Canadian province of Newfoundland and Labrador that is well known for extremely high winds.

Situated at the southern end of the Long Range Mountains at the western mouth of the Codroy Valley, the name originated because high winds - often well in excess of hurricane force - would occasionally blow railway cars on the narrow gauge trains operated by the Newfoundland Railway completely off the track. The word "Wreckhouse" was added to the Canadian Oxford Dictionary in 2004. Although the railway was closed in 1988, the winds are still a hazard to vehicles on Highway 1 and transport trucks occasionally get blown off the road. Winds have been measured over 200 km/h.

Lockie MacDougall, a farmer and trapper, was born in 1896 and lived at Wreckhouse. He had a natural sixth sense to the changes in the weather and this ability allowed him to be employed by Robert Gillespie Reid, whose company built the Newfoundland Railway. MacDougall was paid 20 dollars a month and would inform the railway if it was safe for trains to pass, performing this task for thirty years until his death in 1965. His wife, Emily, continued on with the task until she moved away from the area in 1972. Lockie’s face was painted in a mural on the side a local pizza establishment, in Corner Brook; however the mural was covered up in the late 2010s due to it being significantly damaged.

An anemometer operated by the Meteorological Service of Canada currently provides remote wind data for the Newfoundland and Labrador weather office in Gander which distributes warnings to travellers should the speed be sufficient. The term Wreckhouse Winds is used by the MSC to specifically refer to dangerous wind conditions in this geographic area.
