= Greenock stowaways =

Ill-treated Scottish stowaways of 1868

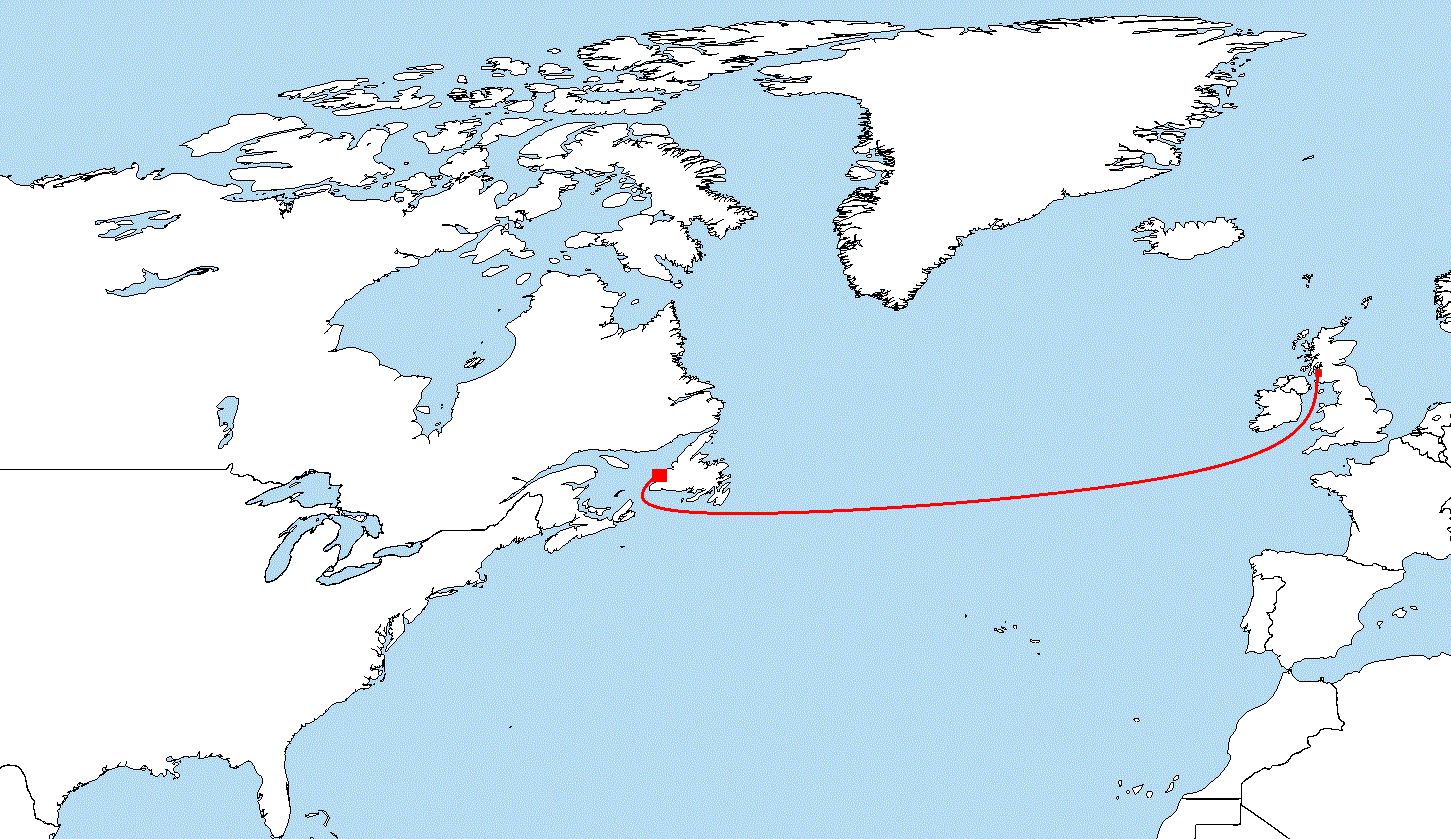

The Greenock stowaways, or Arran stowaways, were six boys (Hugh McEwan, 11; John Paul, 12; (Note: Gale 2018 gives John Paul's age as 11.) Peter Currie, 12; Hugh McGinnes, 12; David Brand, 16; James Bryson, 16) and one young man, Bernard Reilly, 22, who, in April 1868, stowed away at Victoria Dock in Greenock, Scotland, on a cargo ship, the Arran, bound for Quebec, Canada. They were dressed in thin and ragged clothing totally unsuitable for the bitterly cold North Atlantic weather encountered on the voyage; two of the boys (John Paul and Hugh McGinnes) lacked any shoes. On board the ship they were lashed, beaten, starved, sometimes stripped naked or near-naked, had ice-cold sea water thrown over them, were generally ill-treated and, on occasion, handcuffed. All the stowaways were regularly beaten except Peter Currie, whose father was a friend of first mate James Kerr. James Bryson was subjected to torture.

When, after a little over one month at sea, their vessel became trapped in sea-ice off the west coast of Newfoundland, the captain (Note: The captain Robert Watt, age 28, and first mate James Kerr, age 31 were brothers-in-law. (Roughead 2014, p. 14)) ordered that six of them should be put overboard and told to make their way to shore across the ice. The seventh stowaway, Peter Currie, was allowed to remain on board. For the poorly nourished boys in flimsy clothing the trek across the ice was likely to result in their deaths, especially so for the two 12-year-old boys who were forced to walk over the ice in their bare feet. In fact two of the boys, McGinness and McEwan, died on the ice; the remaining four stowaways survived because they were, by chance, spotted by a woman on the shoreline (Catherine Ann Gillis-MacInnis) and rescued by local Newfoundland men. All four were snow-blinded, taking almost a week to fully recover their sight. John Paul, who had to walk on the ice in bare feet, survived the trek, but his badly lacerated feet needed almost a month to heal.

When news of these events reached home, a national scandal resulted. On its return to port, the Arran was met by an angry crowd; the captain of the ship, Robert Watt, and his first mate, James Kerr, had to be escorted off the ship by police. Watt and Kerr were tried in November 1868 at the High Court of Justiciary in Edinburgh, Scotland's highest criminal court. Watt was acquitted of assault, but convicted of culpable homicide and sentenced to 18 months imprisonment; Kerr, who had pleaded guilty to assault, was sentenced to four months, effectively time served.

Watt and Kerr both returned to the sea after completing their sentences, but never sailed with each other again. David Brand founded a marine engineering company in Queensland, Australia, where he died in 1897. James Bryson became a tram conductor in the United States. Peter Currie, the stowaway who was not put overboard, returned to Scotland on board the Arran, and died of consumption two years later. John Paul married at age 19 and had 12 children. He became a foreman in the Greenock shipyards; after his wife's death he moved to Southampton. Bernard Reilly found work on the railways in Halifax, Nova Scotia.

== Background ==
Greenock, on Scotland's west coast, about 27 miles (43 kilometres) west of Glasgow, was a mid sized fishing town in the late nineteenth century. The Arran was a mid sized, three-masted, bulk-cargo sail ship of 1,063 long tons (1,080 tonnes) owned by Ferguson and Hendry of Greenock.

=== Stowaways ===
It appears that nine people, eight of them children, stowed away on the Arran, but two were found and returned to port. Seven others ranging in age from 11 to 22 remained undiscovered. All from very different social backgrounds, they were: Hugh McEwan, (who had taken advantage of his mother sending him into Greenock on an errand to stowaway instead), John Paul, Hugh McGinnes, Peter Currie, James Bryson, David Jolly Brand and Bernard (or Barney) Reilly who, as an adult, lodged on his own in the town. (Note: Reilly was older and much bigger than the other stowaways. Later Bryson would recall how "Big Barney", as they called Reilly, would be particularly gutted "when the biscuits were served out—the big fellow made a wry mouth as he only got the same allowance as the wee fellows". (Donald 1928, p. 75)) McEwan lived with his widowed mother in Glasgow High Street, although they originated from Greenock where the others all lived. They hid belowdecks in various discrete parts of the hold. Reilly appears to have been attempting to emigrate in search of work, but it is unknown what motivated the younger children to come with him. At least one considered it an opportunity for a pleasure cruise, and another the chance to become a sailor. Stowaways were not an uncommon phenomenon often being motivated by adventure and the chance to escape the poverty of the time. (Note: The Memorial University of Newfoundland notes that this was not an uncommon method for a would-be sailor to obtain work experience, as, "They might not otherwise have been accepted as employable by the master". Since working-class children were sent out to work from a young age—to alleviate the costs to their families of having them—stowing away was often seen as a means of working for ones' self or emigrating. (MHA 2011)) Ships were regularly searched on departure, and any stowaways found would be sent back to port on a tugboat, as the Arran had already done with two children.

== Voyage ==
The Arran was captained by Captain Robert Watt (occasionally Warr), aged 28, from Saltcoats, Ayrshire. He was assisted by his brother-in-law, first mate James Kerr, aged 31, of Lochranza, on the Isle of Arran as first mate with a crew of twenty-two men. The ship sailed from Greenock's Victoria Harbour on 7 April 1868 bound for Quebec, transporting coal and oakum. Captain Watt has been described, before the voyage at least, as being of a "weak but not naturally ill-disposed" personality, whereas his first mate was a dominant, even "ferocious", character. They have both been described as "large, bearded men who had never raised families and had neither the inclination nor the time to provide childcare". (Note: John Donald describes Watt as "about five feet eight inches in height, with dark brown hair, his slight beard and moustache being a shade lighter in colour. His conversation was agreeable". (Donald 1928, p. 52))

Once the ship had been released by the tugs well out into the Irish Sea, but just before the carpenter battened down the hatches, the stowaways emerged one by one. First to come out were McEwan and Paul, who may have already been friends on land. It was too late for the ship to return to Greenock, and Captain Watt sent the boys to the cook for a meal. William Roughead, one of the first twentieth-century criminologists to return to the case, has suggested that since the vessel was stocked with plenty of provisions, enough for the next four months, there was sufficient food for the stowaways, and the elder ones at least could work for their berth. (Note: Roughead says "the rations authorised by the captain were, in the circumstances, adequate: 5 lb of beef per day, and 14 oz. of coffee, 7 oz. of tea and 5 lb of sugar per week". (Roughead 2014, p. 15))

=== Ill treatment ===
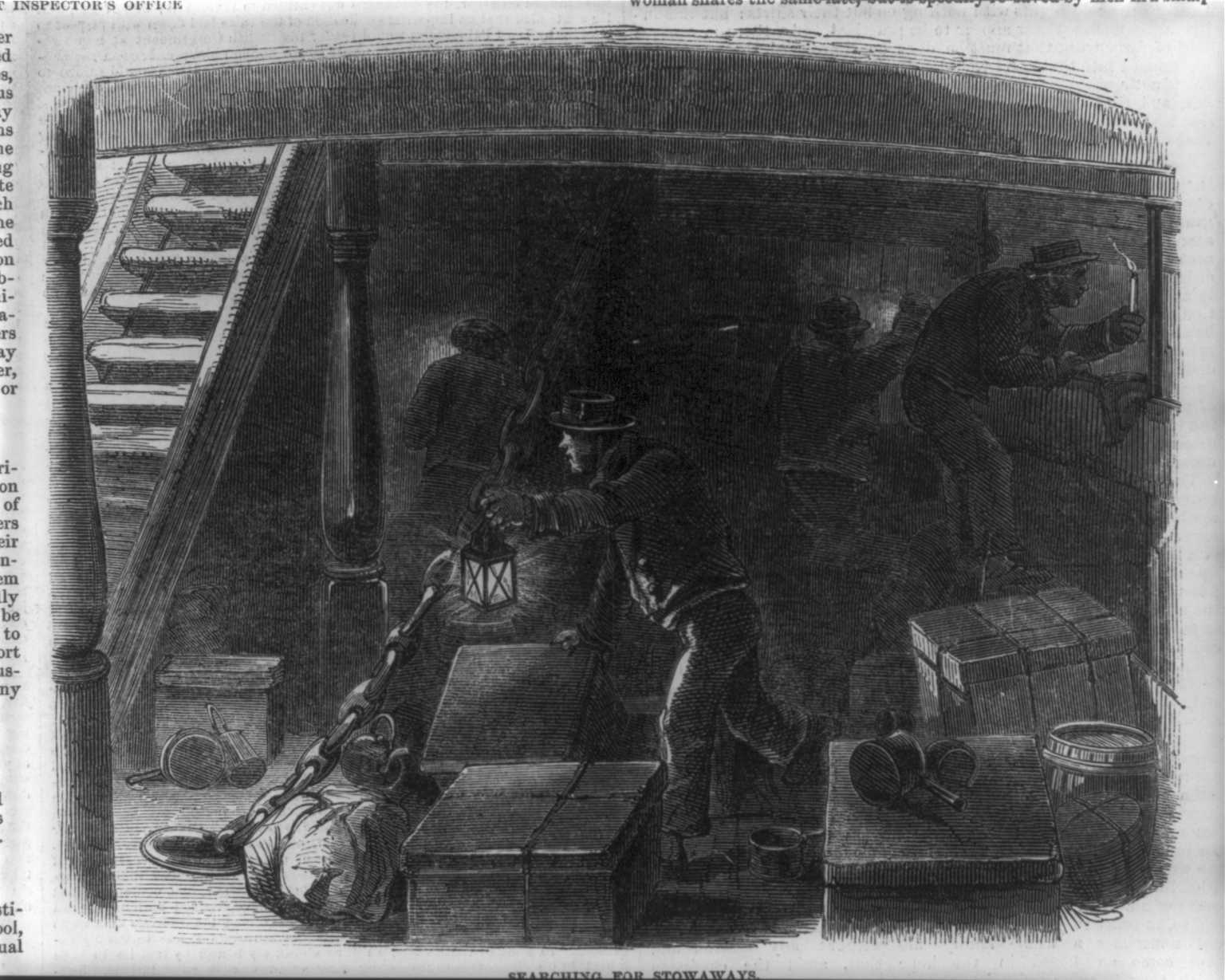
Illustration from the London Evening News, 1850, of a ship's crew searching for stowaways prior to leaving harbour.

Their first night at sea the boys slept in a sail locker. They were given menial work to do as deckhands. It was not long before the ship sailed into rough weather, and the younger boys were repeatedly sea sick. Their sickness induced them to vomit up the valuable meat rations they had received. Kerr, hearing of this, declared that the boys would henceforth get "the ground of their stomachs before they get any more", and ordered an immediate cessation to the meat ration. Their rations were gradually reduced to sea biscuits, sometimes one each, and sometimes one between them. The ship's cook, however, occasionally supplied them with "surreptitious scraps", (Note: Specifically, Kerr swore, according to Roughead, that the first mate would "give the ground of their stomachs before they got any more". (Roughead 2014, p. 15)) and they also scavenged potato and turnip peelings.

The stowaways had boarded the ship wearing only thin clothing. By the time it had entered the North Atlantic, the weather had become bitterly cold. The stowaways had been put to work scrubbing the decks, which formed with ice; they had no shoes between them and only thin coats against the weather. A member of the crew later wrote home that the weather was so bitter that "the men could hardly stand it", let alone the stowaways. The cold weather exacerbated existing problems: since some of the boys had no shoes or other means of protecting their feet, they were unable to perform deck duty and stayed below decks. In turn, Kerr then "went with a rope's end in hand and ordered them out, and as soon as they came out gave them a walloping, and pretty often severely". Roughead notes the captain never interfered with his first mate's disciplinary measures. (Note: Stowaways were traditionally "among the most vulnerable of sea-goers because they depended on the goodwill of the master and mate". (MHA 2011))

Kerr appears to have had a particular issue with James Bryson who suffered Kerr's "full fury", being repeatedly thrashed by both the captain and the first mate. He may have been singled out by them because not only the crew but also his fellow stowaways complained about his lack of cleanliness. As a result, he was stripped of his clothing, made to lie on the deck and repeatedly doused with buckets of icy water; Bryson may have acknowledged that he was responsible for the "mess of filth in the hold", as Donald calls it, for he says that Bryson himself blamed it on having a bowel complaint.

The filthier the children became sleeping below decks, the more they were beaten for being filthy. When they stole food to eat, they were then beaten for their thievery. As the ship neared Newfoundland, a barrel of grain was found to have burst open, and the stowaways were accused of breaking it. They, in turn, blamed members of the crew; Donald notes that a quantity of meal was subsequently discovered in the forecastle, "for which no one could, or would, account". In any case, the stowaways were punished, put in leg irons and handcuffed together for the rest of the day with no food.

The ill-treatment of the stowaways continued as the ship sailed around the southern Newfoundland coast. On 10 May the Arran, which had been fighting its way through ice packs for some time, finally became stuck in an ice field near St. George's Bay, at Cape Anguille in southwestern Newfoundland. Other ships had been similarly caught. (Note: The Arran had encountered ice floes a few days earlier, around the 5th or 6 May, according to a crew member's letter home. Other marooned ships were the Chippewa, Ardmillian, Forganhill and the Myrtle. (Donald 1928, p. 58))

The weather was poor and visibility worse because of fog and sleet. Watt and Kerr left the ship to examine the ice field. The boys took advantage of their absence to forage for food in the hold. When Watt and Kerr returned to the ship and discovered what the children had been doing, they were beaten again.

=== Arrival and marooning in Newfoundland ===
Eventually, Watt and Kerr put the remaining five stowaways off the ship at Bay St. George, near Highlands, on 15 May, between 8:00 am or 9:00 am. An anonymous crew member, who later wrote home from Quebec, reported "succinctly in a dozen words" that, "The stowaways got a biscuit apiece, and were ordered to go ashore". These biscuits were thrown overboard for the boys to gather up from the ice after they had been ejected. Roughead says land "was not visible to the naked eye" from the ship, but Watt "alleged he could see it by means of his spyglass".

Bryson tells us that he had a topcoat, a vest, a pair of trousers, a cravat, and shoes; that Brand, Reilly, and M'Ewan [sic] were well clothed; but that while Paul had a blue coat, he was barefooted, and...M'Ginnes [sic] was not only barefooted but literally in rags, his skin showing through the rents in his garments.

— John Donald

The captain told them personally that there were plenty of occupied dwellings "not so far away", or there was another ship also stranded in the ice within reasonable distance to which they could make their way. (Note: This was the then one-year-old general cargo ship, Myrtle from Stobcross Yard, Glasgow. (Scottish Built Ships n.d.)) In the meantime, Watt said there was insufficient food left on the Arran to provide for them any longer.

No one actually knew with certainty how far the ship was from land; various reckonings were made which suggested a distance of between 8 and 20 miles (13 and 32 kilometres); "the mate, taking a rosier view of the boys' prospects, put it at five" (8 km). According to the boys' testimony at the later trial, McGinnes asked Watt how he was meant to cope on the ice flow with bare feet. He replied that "it would be as well for him to die upon the ice as he would get no more food there". At least one crew member believed that it was unlikely "that those without shoes would ever reach the land".

Of the six boys, Reilly and Bryson were keen to leave at Bay St George. Reilly was eager to seek work, and Bryson felt "nothing worse could happen than he had suffered on the ship". John Paul, Hugh McEwan, David Brand and Hugh McGinnes followed, but Paul Currie did not. Apparently, he had been asked to remain on the ship and had consented. (Note: Roughead suggests that Currie's father was a friend of the first mate, which could explain why he escaped the myriad punishments doled out by him and the captain. The mate's influence with the captain probably accounts for Currie not sharing his fellows' fate at Bay St George. (Roughead 2014, p. 23 n.1)) McEwan, by now, had been coughing up blood for some time and asked the captain to change his mind. Watt replied that he "might as well die on the ice as on the ship".

==== Journey to land ====
The stowaways later related the harsh conditions they travelled in. Bryson said the first day they walked twelve hours, with the ice getting thinner the closer they got to the shore. The ice was breaking up with the warmer spring tides, and they were all subject to regular slips, falls and drenchings on route. This, in turn, caused their thin clothes to freeze "as hard as boards" onto them. It was in the course of falling through the ice that they lost McEwan, who was the youngest and the weakest physically; he fell in most often. He had been spitting blood for some time. Bryson related:

We all fell into crevices at various times. We got out the best way we could, each just had to scramble for himself. M'Ewan [sic] fell in once and I pulled him out; he fell in a second time and scrambled out himself; the third time he went down and never came up, the ice closed over him. it was hopeless to try and save him...

McEwan died about midday. McGinnes was also left behind. Wearing only ragged frozen clothes, a few hours after McEwan's death, by now about 5 miles (8 kilometres) from shore, he sat down and said he could go no longer:

Some of them had hardly any clothes and spat blood. M'Ewan (sic) was a delicate child and spat blood; so that as soon as the weather worsened their plight became truly pitiable. But pity was not an item included on the Arran' manifest.

We urged him to come along with us, and said if he did not he knew what would become of him: he would be frozen. He appeared exhausted. No attempt was made to assist him; we had enough to do to assist ourselves...we heard his cries a long way behind us although we could not see him...

David Brand deposed that it was impossible for them to help McGinnes—the ice was too treacherous and prevented them from trying to carry him.

The captain may have expressed concern for the boys after they left the ship. Donald reports that he posted a regular watch to look out for them and even took the duty himself; he suggested to Kerr that they send out a party to bring them back, but the first mate replied they would doubtless be back by dinnertime.

The stowaways had given up trying to find the Myrtle and had been making for shore. About a mile from land the ice ended. Using chunks of ice as makeshift canoes, and paddling with pieces of wood, they made their way slowly towards the shore, where they could now see the light of dwellings. They shouted for help, but it is unlikely they were heard. They were eventually spotted—at some distance, and in the dusk with the light behind them—by Catherine Anne Gillis MacInnis, (Note: Catherine MacInnis' family had emigrated to Newfoundland from Loch Morar, in the Scottish Highlands, nearly twenty years earlier. (McDermott 2018)) with the aid of some old opera glasses. A resident of Highlands and one whose house could be seen from the Arran, she summoned help. A boat, crewed by her husband and other local men, was dispatched to pick them up and ferry them in. The boat had to be carried over the ice before it could be launched. Making their way out into the ice flow, the men picked up the "strange voyager", as The Scotsman later referred to the boys' craft. This was merely a large lump of ice. Brand was picked up first, then Reilly, and lastly Bryson and Paul who were at the other side of the ice flow. Further, the paper reported that the Newfoundlanders, "being informed that McGinnes had been left on the ice, proceeded back some distance, in hopes that they might find him. But no trace could be had of him". The boys were taken to Catherine MacInnis' fisher-farmhouse to recuperate.

== Return and legal proceedings ==
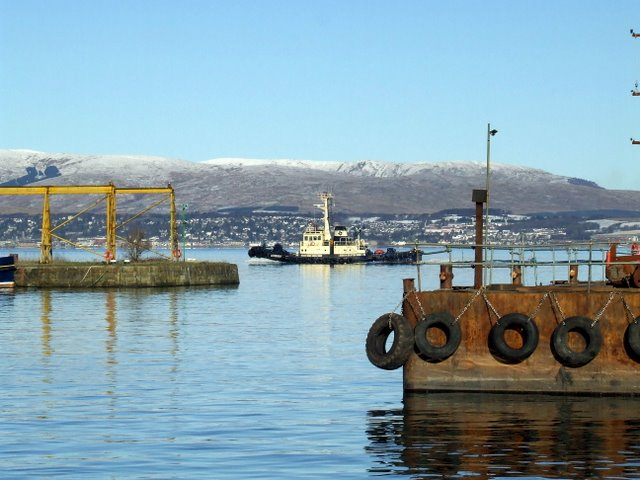
The mouth of Victoria Harbour, Greenock, looking out onto the Clyde. The Arran sailed from here in April 1868 and returned here in July. This 2009 photograph shows a tugboat passing.

The same night the children were picked up in St George's Bay, the ice shifted and the Arran was released; she arrived in Quebec in early June 1868. At this point officers and crew learned that the story of the stowaways was by then generally known. They heard from the crew of the Myrtle that at least two of their stowaways had died on the ice. Also, on 10 June, a crew member wrote to his family in Greenock from Quebec (Note: John Donald suggest that this letter, although now anonymous, is a trustworthy and impartial source as to the unfolding of events on the Arran because its author would hardly have expected it ever to be published. (Donald 1928, p. 55)) and described the boys' journey and the behaviour of the officers. Greenock then was a "small closely knit port town", and when the letter arrived it caused "great consternation". Facts were unclear, and rumours as to the boys' fate abounded, including that they had all died.

=== Return of the Arran ===
The populace of Greenock was angry and remained so until the return of the Arran on Thursday, 30 July 1868 when news spread of its arrival in the Clyde. A hostile reception awaited the ship, and after she moored, some local men managed to board her. The officers may have escaped a lynching by locking themselves in the captain's cabin and defending themselves with their pistols. The harbourmaster, one Captain Millar, reported the riot to police, who arrived under the command of a Lieutenant Burrell. They were unable to disperse the crowd until nearly midnight. The next day, Watt and Kerr were transported to the courthouse in a taxi. It was followed by a still-angry crowd, who were "hooting, yelling and pelting the vehicle with stones". They were charged before the Sheriff with "cruelly and maliciously compelling one or more of her Majesty's lieges to leave a ship"; bail was refused. At this point it was not yet known in Scotland that two further children had died since being put ashore.

These charges were probably holding charges intended to justify the officers' detention while preliminary enquiries were made. In the meantime, the procurator fiscal contacted the Newfoundland police. They informed him that, to their knowledge, five children had reached the shore, four of whom were still with Catherine MacInnis. Of the others, Reilly had moved on to Halifax, Nova Scotia, and joined the railways, while the two youngest had died. As a result of this new information, the two officers were also charged with murder. This count was subsequently dropped. As well as the charge of evicting a ship's passengers, they were also accused of assault and "barbarous usage".

=== Return of the surviving stowaways ===
He [Kerr] made me take off my jacket, waistcoat, and shirt, leaving only my semmit [vest] on. The coil was about half an inch thick. The mate flogged me for about three minutes and the blows were very painful.[1]

— James Bryson, November 1868

The four children who had survived were unable to do anything in St George's Bay for at least a week, as they had all suffered from snow blindness from the glare of the ice, and those such as John Paul who had been shoeless had severely lacerated soles which took some weeks to heal. John Paul, at least, also lost fingers and toes through frostbite; he had been so badly injured that his rescuers had had to carry him up to the house. At one point they worked at fishing and farming in Sandy Point, on the other side of the Bay but later split up to travel around Newfoundland for work. One of them, who is unknown, wrote a letter home to Greenock reporting on their rescue by the Innes of Cape Breton Island.

The boys were required as witnesses in Scotland, however, and so were regrouped by the Newfoundland police and taken to St. John's where they were transported in a brigantine owned by Greenock's provost and member of parliament (Note: James Grieve had been elected MP for Greenock in August 1868, when he defeated W. D. Christie in what was described as a "remarkable contest". His company, Baine Johnstones, specialised in the seal trade in Newfoundland, and, indeed, had been one of the first two companies ever to invest in a steamship for the purpose of breaking the ice floes there. (Ryan 1994, p. 145)) called the Hannah and Bennie. He also provided for their clothing and provisioning from his company's own stores, recorded The Scotsman. They arrived on the Clyde on 1 October 1868, exactly six months since they had left. When asked what had motivated him to stow away in the first place, John Paul stated that:

The reason I ran away from Greenock was for a pleasure sail. I was comfortable at home. I lived with my mother, but did not tell her I was going. I took the Arran to go in because she was a good ship. I did not know the captain.

The Scotsman described their arrival in Greenock on Thursday, 1 October 1868, saying they were met by a "great crowd" of locals. The following day town officials began legally questioning them as to their experiences with Watt and Kerr, which, the paper suggested, dovetailed with the accounts of the Arran's crew. There had been a confusion over the names of the survivors in the telegrams to and from Newfoundland, however, and it was originally reported that Hugh McGinnes had survived and was returning to Greenock. As such, his widowed mother went to the docks to meet the returning children, only to discover that it was not the case; a local paper reported how she

Went down expecting to meet her son, when she received the painful information that he had died on the ice from exhaustion. Another lad, named [John] Paul, who was believed to have perished, has returned.

— The Scotsman, 5 October 1868

They reported on the "very painful scene" that occurred when she found out that he had died on the ice. It had been John Paul who had been reported as lost; he had, however, survived.

=== Trial of Watt and Kerr ===
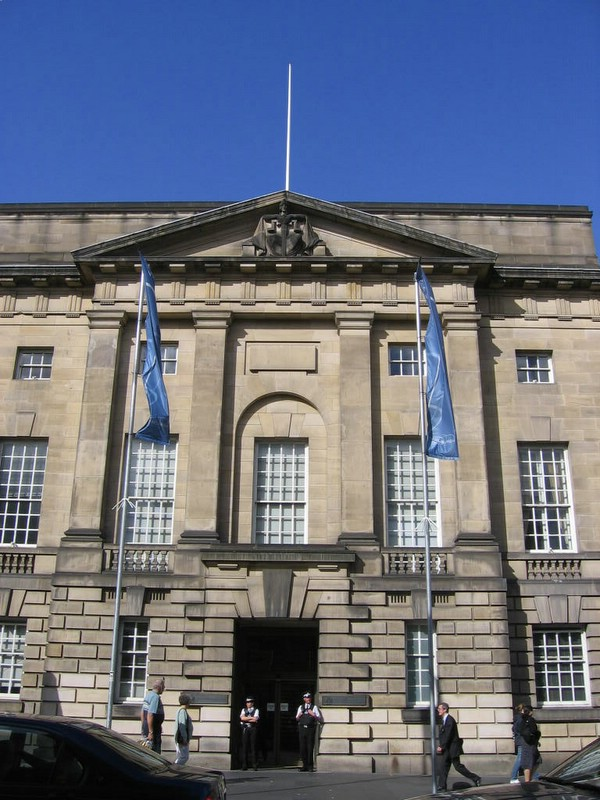
The High Court of Justiciary in Parliament House, Edinburgh, where Watt and Kerr were tried in November 1868

Captain Watt and first mate Kerr were tried at the High Court of Justiciary. They appeared before Lord Justice Clerk George Patton in Edinburgh on 23 November. The trial was to last three days; (Note: The trial was covered in full each day by The Scotsman, while the official report can be found in Couper's Justiciary Reports I, 123-168. (Roughead 2014, p. 19)) they had already spent four months in custody.

The charge of forcing the boys to leave the ship to their own endangerment was objected to by the defence on the grounds of being innominate in law, but after much debate and deliberation the Judge allowed it to stand and the trial proceeded. Members of the Arran's crew testified for both the defence and the prosecution. For the former, the steward and boatswain appeared, while for the latter, six seamen and the cook took the stand.

==== Prosecution ====
The stowaways were the main witnesses summoned by the prosecution. First to testify was James Bryson, who told the court how, after they left Glasgow, they remained hidden "for a day and a night", only emerging when they saw the hatches about to be nailed. From that point on, he said he was often sick, for which he was repeatedly "scrubbed and flogged" with the lead line. Other punishments included dousings with ice-cold salt water and the public removal of his clothes after which he would be forced to stand on the forecastle for hours at a time or scrub the decks naked. He said as a result, "I suffered very much from exposure". Bryson testified that throughout this the Captain was a silent observer, and on occasion flogged Bryson himself. On other occasions, the boys were made to scrub each other at the direction of the first mate. John Paul, who "was so small he had to be mounted on a stool in the witness box so he could be seen", reported how he had been unable to make himself a pair of trousers because the canvas he was trying to use was taken away. He also related how the first mate beat him with a belaying pin.

The crewmembers who testified for the prosecution, "sought to minimize the cruelty with which the stowaways were treated throughout the voyage". For example, the exchange between one George Henry under cross-examination by the jury demonstrates this. Having been asked, "If the master or mate had been going to murder the boys, would you have interfered?" He answered, "There was a chance of their reaching the shore, and some of them did reach it". The ship's cook, meanwhile, attested to the fact that, contrary to the captain's assertion in Canada, the ship had plenty of provisions to get them all to Quebec. Captain Watt averred that, in fact, he had merely told the children that they could have fun playing on the ice. When he pointed out the houses on the shore, it was merely to suggest they could have "a fine run" there. Either way, Watt admitted he did enquire after their well-being following their departure; first mate Kerr bluntly denied ever harming Bryson, by either scrubbings or beatings. One crewmember, James Hardy, testified as to the condition of Bryson's skin after one of his beatings describing it as looking like red and white tartan. Although Kerr pleaded not guilty to culpable homicide from the start, he subsequently changed his plea to being guilty of assault alone. This plea was accepted by the prosecution.

==== Defence ====
The jury would have to determine three minor points: firstly, whether, there was any compulsion used in putting the boys on the ice, or whether they left the ship of their own free will; second, what was the amount of danger attending the journey over the ice, assuming it was compulsorily taken; and third, what were the consequences that might have reasonably been expected to ensue from a journey undertaken in such circumstances.

— The Attorney General

The main witness for the defence was twelve-year-old Peter Currie, who had returned on the Arran with Watt and Kerr. He testified that when the other boys had left the ship, he had heard Kerr tell other members of the crew that "he would wager any man on board £20 that they would be back to their dinner", but Currie also described how the captain both ordered the boys to leave and assisted them in doing so, with them "'greeting' [weeping] all the time". (Note: A term, in Scotland, to mean not just "hello" or an act of greeting, but also crying or weeping. The Scotsman newspaper tells of an English woman working in Scotland, who soon after arriving was told that a colleague was "'in the back greeting'. I thought she'd lost her mind and was continually saying 'hello' and waving into thin air." (Fowler 2014)) He also stated that he believed they had a half biscuit each at about 8:00 am, which was the first thing they had eaten since noon the previous day. Other members of the crew praised the captain for being a "kind, quiet man, who seldom interfered with the discipline of a ship", which, they said, was in the purview of the first mate. One crew member said that he thought grown men could probably have successfully made the journey to land, "but not for boys so clad". The chaplain of the local Seaman's Friend Society stated on oath that he believed Watts to be of such a kind disposition, "especially to boys", that they would often stowaway on his ship for that very reason. The parish minister of nearby Ardrossan also testified to the captain's good character.

"The case", noted the Solicitor General, "was one of considerable importance", hinging as it did on the extent and breadth of a sea captain's authority on his own ship, which "might be used for good or evil". He put it to the jury that the boys were clearly compelled to leave the ship against their will; that the journey was bound to be extremely dangerous whoever made it; and that the consequences of the journey were far from being unforeseeable. Overall, he said, the ship's captain was directly responsible for all these things. The defence, however, submitted it was incredible to suggest that 22 professional sailors would stand by watching such alleged abuses take place with no one saying anything, let alone doing nothing. The defence also noted that the charges of assault were the least heinous. If anything, a number of the stowaways may have deserved a form of corporal punishment since, by their own admission, they had stolen food both before and after their discovery on the vessel.

As to the most serious charge, that of putting the boys ashore and inciting their certain deaths, defence counsel suggested that the true course of events was somewhat different to that presented by the prosecution. The captain, he said, had originally put them on the surrounding ice a couple of days previously "for the purpose of giving them a fright", but had subsequently taken them back aboard. Reilly and Bryson, said the defence, decided to go out again taking the smaller children with them; for this, it was suggested, the captain could not be blamed. He believed that they would all return when they realised the dangers. At least one contemporary source reports that this line of argument was refuted by the judge himself. The defence maintained that the deaths, while tragic, could not be laid on the culpability of the captain—especially since no bodies had been found. Indeed counsel proposed, "it would surprise no-one if both McEwan and McGinnes were to turn up alive and well".

The jury retired at 3:30 pm on 27 November 1868. Their deliberations lasted 35 minutes. They found Captain Watt not guilty on the charges of assault, but guilty of culpable homicide and putting ashore the Queen's subjects from a British vessel. On account of his previous good character, the jury made a recommendation of mercy. The first mate was already guilty of assault by his own plea. Both men received prison sentences. Captain Watt received 18 months, and his first mate four. For Kerr this amounted to time served. "The astounding lightness of the sentence" was met by the packed public gallery "with loud hisses". (Note: In London, The Spectator dated 5 December 1868, for example, described how "the barest statement of the facts is sufficient to draw tears, or rouse decent men into a fever of indignation", and, on McGinnes' death, declared, "If ever there was murder done on earth, that lad was murdered". (The Spectator 5 December 1868, pp. 9–10))

In London, The Spectator took advantage of the soft treatment of the two officers to indulge in some casual racism at the Scots' expense, describing it as indicative of a "callousness [that] might, in this instance, be set down to that latent 'hardness,' diamond-heartedness, as Queen Mary called it, which is the one defect Scotchmen admit in themselves". The paper did, however, lambast the ability of ships' captains to get away with the mistreatment of their crews in a manner that would never be tolerated on dry land. The newspaper compared it to a mistress who struck her maid: "It is difficult for the police to protect her from popular vengeance; but a merchant officer may do anything, yet scarcely stir the sympathies of the jury".

== Aftermath ==
Following the trial, Bryson emigrated to America with his father and became a streetcar conductor. Reilly had already ended up in Halifax, Nova Scotia, and does not seem to have ever returned to Scotland. Peter Currie only survived the trial by two years, dying of consumption. John Paul married and had twelve children. When his wife died, he moved to the south coast of England, to Itchen, near Southampton. There he became a riveter and eventually a foreman, and remarried. He died in 1913 and was buried in an unmarked grave in St Mary Extra churchyard. David Brand emigrated, to Townsville, Australia, and built a successful engineering firm; he died in 1897. Watt and Kerr returned to the sea after finishing their sentences, although they never sailed with each other again. It appears that Watt died in Pensacola, Florida, a few years later, but Kerr continued to have a long career on the sea, eventually rising to the rank of captain himself. The Arran ended its life in 1886 as a shipwreck on Sand Island, off the coast of Alabama, en route from Greenock to Mobile, Alabama.

=== Media coverage ===
Contemporaries considered the case a cause célèbre and a national scandal. In Scotland, apart from The Scotsman, the stowaways' stories were also covered by The Dundee Courier & Argus and especially The Glasgow Herald. There was extensive coverage in English newspapers too, including: the London Standard, the Cheshire Observer, Liverpool Mercury, Royal Cornwall Gazette, Manchester Weekly Times, The Leicester Chronicle and Mercury, and The Huddersfield Chronicle and West Yorkshire Advertiser.

The case remained of international interest into the next year: In Australia The Brisbane Courier reproduced the Scotsman's coverage of the case. In the US even local papers such as the Rockland County Messenger wrote extensively about it. Over the following years the legal profession did treat it as a case study in sentencing disparity. The Spectator led a campaign against "'cruel or unusual' punishment, like that of keeping a lad naked on deck in Arctic cold" which the paper believed was prevalent throughout the merchant service.

== Modern significance ==
John Donald, who wrote early enough to have been able to interview some of the stowaways' elderly contemporaries, has compared Captain Watt's "general disposition (amply testified as being amiable) and his actual behaviour on the voyage". Even if he was to some extent influenced against his will by his brother-in-law, says Donald, this "certainly does not exonerate him from guilt". William Roughead questioned the role of the mate in the eviction of the stowaways. On the one hand, he says, it was most likely his diabolic treatment of them that inspired the captain to do so; yet, on the other, he seems to have effaced himself from the proceedings. According to John Paul's testimony, when Paul asked that he be kept on board, the mate answered that "he would have nothing to do with putting [them] ashore on the ice". Perhaps, comments Roughead, "in view of the possible consequences...he wished, ostensibly, to have no hand in it so that he might hold himself free from innocent blood". He also considered the crew's behaviour in a similar fashion: there were 22 men who looked on and did nothing. They later claimed to both consider that the ice was far too dangerous for such young children, but also maintain they had no right to interfere with the captain's running of his ship.

The Memorial University of Newfoundland's Maritime History Archive notes that Watt had "made no mention of the stowaways in his log, and if it hadn't been for the ensuing court case and the accompanying press coverage, the identities of these boys and their stories would likely not have come to light". Descendants of the stowaways eventually ended up around the world "and at least one" was found in Australia.

An annual commemoration of the stowaways' rescue was organised by the Bay St. George Historical Society and the Bay St. George South Local Service District to be held on the third Sunday of May. A commemorative site with Interpretative kiosks, and a plaque commemorating the event was placed on Catherine MacInnes' grave.

=== In literature ===
The story of the Arran stowaways has been told regularly ever since and fictionalised several times. In 1928 John Donald depicted it in his The Stowaways and other Sketches. One hundred and fifty years later, this was rewritten as a graphic novel by Magic Torch Comics in association with a local primary school, Ardgowan, in Greenock, retitled The Boys on the Ice. In 2002, John Paul's great-grandson, Tony Paul, told the tale in his The Brats, and in 2015, Patrick J. Collins fictionalised the story in his Forsaken Children.

== Bibliography ==
- "The Alleged Cruelty to Stowaway Boys on a Greenock Ship". The Scotsman. No. 11278. 5 October 1868. OCLC 535280797.
- "The Alleged Cruelty to Stowaways". Liverpool Mercury. 10 August 1868. OCLC 785645858.
- Campsie, A. (2016). "The Arran stowaways thrown off a ship in Newfoundland". The Scotsman. No. 30 November 2016.
- "The Case of Alleged Cruelty to Stowaways". Home news. The Standard. No. 13729. London. 5 August 1868. OCLC 875133129.
- "The Case of Cruelty to the Boy Stowaways". Manchester Weekly Times. No. 559. 15 August 1868. OCLC 22950697.
- "Case of the Greenock Stowaways". The Dundee Courier & Argus. 10 November 1868. OCLC 720042606.
- "Cruelty to Stowaways on the High Seas". Brisbane Courier. 4 February 1869 – via Trove.
- "Cruelty to Stowaways—Six Boys left to Die on Ice". Cheshire Observer and Chester, Birkenhead, Crewe and North Wales Times. No. 664. 8 August 1868. OCLC 686765975.
- "Deadly Voyage: Stowaways and the Case of the Arran". Maritime History Archive. Memorial University of Newfoundland. 2011. Archived from the original on 6 July 2018.
- Donald, J. (1928). The Stowaways and Other Sketches: True Tales of the Sea. Perth: Milne, Tannahill & Methven. OCLC 24945841.
- "Extraordinary Cruelty to Stowaways". The Leicester Chronicle and Mercury. No. 1868. 5 December 1868. OCLC 688656098.
- "Extraordinary Sufferings of 'Stowaways' in the Artic Region". Rockwell County Messenger. Vol. XXIII, no. 41. 11 February 1869.
- "Fascinating story of 'Arran Stowaways' told in new graphic novel". Scottish Legal News. 5 January 2017.
- Fowler, C. (9 September 2014). "Scottish word of the week: Greeting". The Scotsman.
- Gale, F. (23 February 2018). "Historical society to commemorate 150-year-old lifesaving event in Highlands". The Western Star.
- "The Greenock Stowaways". The Glasgow Herald. No. 9017. 26 November 1868.
- "The Greenock Stowaways". The Spectator. 5 December 1868. OCLC 191225423.
- "(Greting,) Greitt-, Greeting, ppl. a". Dictionary of the Scottish Language. Scottish Language Dictionaries. 2018.
- Grudić, J. (19 May 2018). "Stowaways thrown off ship near N.L. remembered by descendants 150 years later". CBC.
- Hallard, F. (1871). "On the Inequality of Sentences in Criminal Causes". The Journal of Jurisprudence. XV. Edinburgh: 62–72. OCLC 1697066.
- James, B. (2011). Popular Crime: Reflections on the Celebration of Violence. New York: Simon and Schuster. ISBN 978-1-41655-274-1.
- Janes, B. K. (2015). "Riverhead Author Retells St. George's Bay Horror". Burton K Janes.
- McDermott, S. (30 May 2018). "The Boys on the Ice". BBC News.
- "MYRTLE". Scottish Built Ships. Caledonian Maritime Research Trust. 2018.
- Paul, Tony (2002). The BRATS: A Real Life Seafaring Adventure. Woodfield Publishing. ISBN 978-190395326-6.
- Roughead, W. (2014). "The Boys on the Ice or, The Arran Stowaways". Nothing But Murder. Plymouth: M. Evans. pp. 13–38. ISBN 978-1-59077-463-2.
- Ryan, S. (1994). The Ice Hunters: A History of Newfoundland Sealing to 1914. Newfoundland History Series. Vol. 8. St John's, NF: Breakwater Books. ISBN 978-1-55081-097-4.
- "The Shocking Case of Cruelty to Stowaways". The Huddersfield Chronicle and West Yorkshire Advertiser. No. 973. 5 December 1868. OCLC 688641757.
- Snow, E. R. (1966). Astounding tales of the sea. London: Redman. OCLC 460953.
- "Stowaways". The Royal Cornwall Gazette, Falmouth Packet, and General Advertiser. No. 3396. Truro. 13 August 1868. OCLC 690035048.
- Tinney, L. (7 April 2018). "Descendants of an Inverclyde ship stowaway who miraculously survived ordeal mark anniversary". Greenock Telegraph. OCLC 500151140.
