= Samuel Wix =

English cleric and controversialist

Samuel Wix (1771–1861) was an English cleric and controversialist.

== Life ==
Born in London on 9 February 1771, he was the second son of Edward Wix of St. Peter's, Cornhill. He was educated at Charterhouse School under Samuel Berdmore, and was admitted at the Inner Temple (16 August 1783). He studied at Christ's College, Cambridge, where he was admitted pensioner on 8 November 1791, and elected scholar on 6 December 1792. He graduated B.A. in 1796 and M.A. in 1799.

Wix was ordained deacon in 1798 and priest in 1800. After holding a number of curacies, he was presented in 1802 to the living of Inworth, Essex. Six years later he was elected hospitaller and vicar of St Bartholomew's the Less in London. He was also for a time president of Sion College.

A fellow of the Royal Society and the Society of Antiquaries of London. He died at the vicarage, St. Bartholomew's, London, on 4 September 1861. A tablet to his memory was erected in the church by the governors of St. Bartholomew's Hospital.

== Works ==
A High Church traditionalist, Wix involved himself in controversy. His first publication was Scriptural Illustrations of the Thirty-nine Articles, with a practical Commentary on each … affectionately intended to promote Religious Peace and Unity,. It was followed in 1818 by a more ambitious eirenicon, published originally in the Eclectic Review, entitled Reflections concerning the Expediency of a Council of the Church of England and the Church of Rome being holden, with a view to accommodate Religious Differences. This produced, among other answers, an angry reply from Thomas Burgess. Wix wrote two rejoinders. Reflections also attracted the attention of Jerome, 4th Count de Salis-Soglio, who became Wix's lifelong friend, and had the book translated at his own expense into several foreign languages.

Wix was opposed to Catholic Emancipation, and in 1822 issued a pamphlet in support of his views. He wrote many similar pamphlets. He also supported the Society for the Improvement of Prison Discipline led by Basil Montagu; and wrote Reflections Concerning the Expediency and Unchristian Character of Capital Punishments, as Prescribed by the Criminal Laws of England (1832).

== Family ==
By his wife, Frances Walford of Sible Hedingham, Wix had several children. The eldest son was Edward Wix (1802–1866), a graduate of Trinity College, Oxford, was sometime archdeacon of Newfoundland, and afterwards vicar of St. Michael's, Swanmore, near Ryde, where he died on 24 November 1866, being succeeded in the parish by his son, Richard Hooker Edward Wix (1832–1884). He was a frequent contributor to the Gentleman's Magazine, and the author of Six Months of a Newfoundland Missionary's Journal, 1836, and of A Retrospect of the Operations of the Society for the Propagation of the Gospel in North America, 2nd edit. 1833.

== Notes ==
Attribution

This article incorporates text from a publication now in the public domain: Lee, Sidney, ed. (1900). "Wix, Samuel". Dictionary of National Biography. Vol. 62. London: Smith, Elder & Co.
