= Grand Codroy Estuary =

- Estuary
- Location of Grand Codroy Estuary in Newfoundland
- Coordinates: 47°50′45″N 59°18′48″W
- Country: Canada
- Province: Newfoundland and Labrador
- Time zone: UTC-3:30 (Newfoundland Time)
  - Summer (DST): UTC-2:30 (Newfoundland Daylight)
- Area code: 709

Ramsar Wetland
- Designated: 27 May 1987
- Reference no.: 364

The Grand Codroy Estuary is a 925 hectare wetland on the southwestern coast of the island of Newfoundland in Canada, approximately 30 km north of Port aux Basques. It is "[one] of the most productive of Newfoundland's few estuarine wetland sites", and is "the province's most important wetland". It is a Wetland of International Importance under the Ramsar Convention, receiving this designation on May 27, 1987. To the south is a globally significant Important Bird Area.

As a result of the provincial Order in Council named the Hunting Prohibition Order, hunting has not been permitted on the estuary since 1974.

== Geography ==
The estuary consists of adjoining marine and intertidal habitats with an elevation no more than one metre. Four islands are located within the estuary, and the intertidal sandbars give way to mudflats "supporting rich growths of Zostera". The site is surrounded by cultivated grasslands.

The marine area is shallow, at most two metres deep in intertidal areas, and somewhat deeper in the river channel.

It is bounded by privately owned land, the Codroy Valley Provincial Park, and the Gulf of Saint Lawrence. Nearby are the Grand Codroy and Little Codroy rivers, which are popular fishing destinations.

== Fauna ==
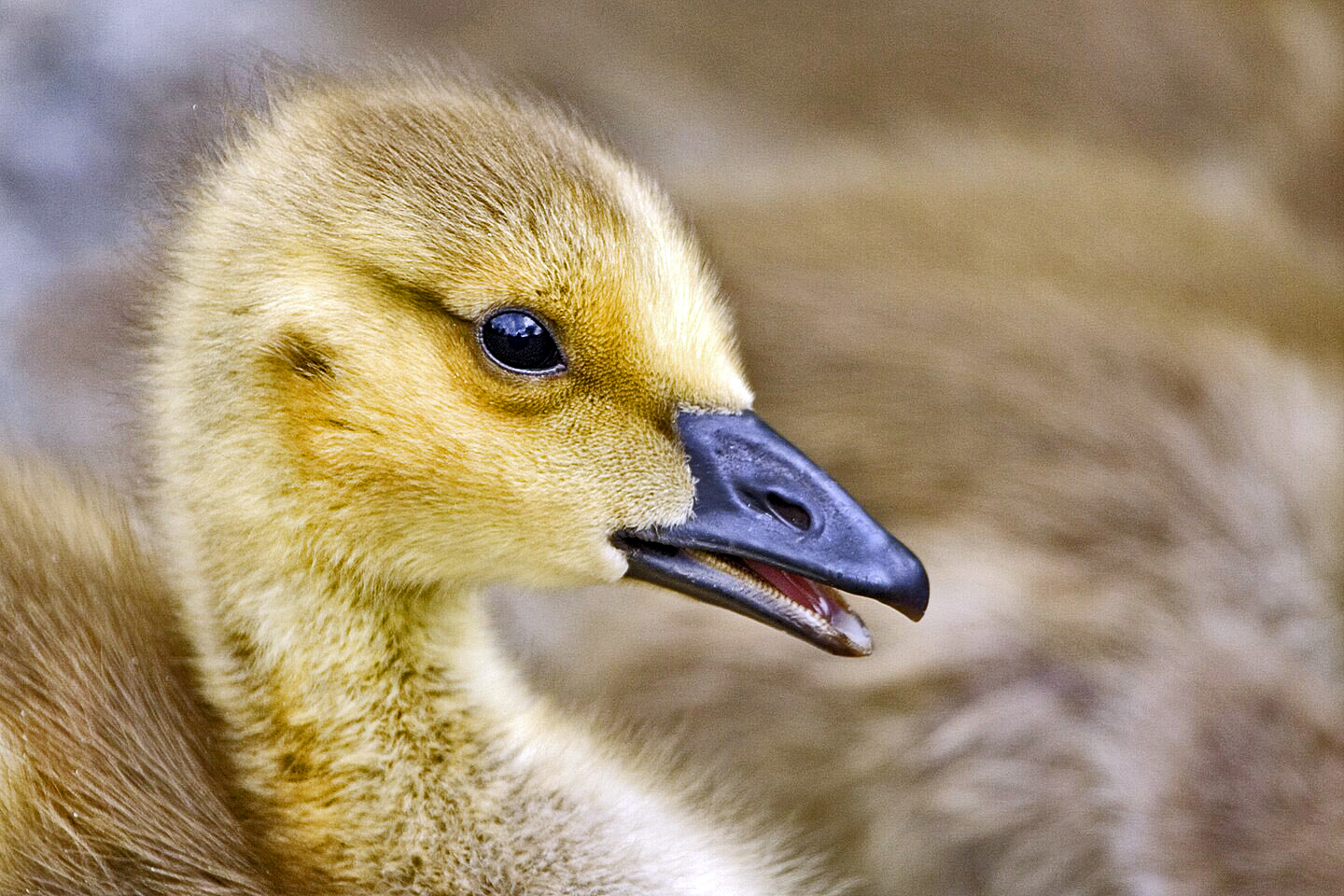
A gosling of the Canada goose, which stage at Grand Codroy Estuary during migration.

The abundant Zostera and protective grasslands provide an ideal environment for the fall staging of various bird species. Moderate Canada goose populations, up to 3000 during migration, use the estuary annually. Other bird species include the great blue heron, American black duck, wood duck, American green-winged teal, American wigeon, blue-winged teal, common goldeneye, common merganser, greater scaup, northern pintail, northern shoveler, red-breasted merganser, and the ring-necked duck.

== Tourism ==
The wetland is actively promoted as a tourist destination, especially targeting birdwatchers, photographers, and naturalists. A seasonal visitor's centre is available for information.
