= List of highways numbered 408 =

Route 408 or Highway 408 may refer to:

== Canada ==
- Manitoba Provincial Road 408

== Costa Rica ==
- National Route 408

== Japan ==
- Japan National Route 408

== United States ==
- Florida State Road 408
- Georgia State Route 408 (unsigned designation for Interstate 475
- Louisiana Highway 408
- Maryland Route 408
  - Maryland Route 408
- New York:
  - New York State Route 408
    - New York State Route 408A (former)
  - New York State Route 408 (former)
  - County Route 408 (Albany County, New York)
  - County Route 408 (Erie County, New York)
- Pennsylvania Route 408
- Puerto Rico Highway 408
- Texas State Highway Spur 408
- Virginia State Route 408 (former)

Preceded by 407	Lists of highways 408	Succeeded by 409
