= Fishing admiral =

Fishing captain in 17th-century Newfoundland

In Newfoundland, a fishing admiral was an office for the control of the fishing fleet given to the first ship to arrive on station. The post was officially recognised under the Western Charter of 1634. The rise of a permanent population necessitating more effective rule resulted in Britain assigning a governor to the island in 1729 and effectively ending importance of the role Fishing Admiral.

== History ==
The colonization of Newfoundland had failed and the fishing admiral was established as a mechanism to resolve migratory fishing interests of the settler population. The position had customary legal authority since the beginning of the seventeenth century and rank was determined by the order of arrival for the fishing season: the first fishing captain to arrive became the admiral while the second and third assumed the positions of vice and rear admirals, respectively. These personnel were arbitrary men and were also generally ignorant of the law although the position was called upon to "settle all disputes among the fishermen, and enforce due attention to certain acts of parliament." This explained why an account stated that the fishing admirals did not play a significant role in the legal development of the colony.
