= Noels Pond =

Coordinates: 48.552°N 58.528°W

Location of Noel's Pond in Newfoundland and Labrador

Noels Pond is a settlement in Newfoundland and Labrador.
