= Edward Wix =

English clergyman (1802–1866)

Ven. Edward Wix (1802–1866) was an English clergyman best known as an Anglican missionary in Canada.

== Early life ==
Edward Wix was the eldest son of Samuel Wix (1771-1861), a noted controversialist and high churchman, and his wife Frances Walford (1781-1851). Edward Wix was educated at the Merchant Taylors’ School in London. He graduated from Trinity College, Oxford with a B.A. in 1824, and was ordained as a priest in 1825.

== In Nova Scotia ==
Wix served in the Diocese of Nova Scotia under Bishop John Inglis, initially as the Bishop's chaplain. According to the records of the Society for the Propagation of the Gospel (S.P.G.), Wix was in Halifax from 1826 to 1830, although he traveled to England in 1828, where he recovered from typhus, married and completed his M.A.. He became Archdeacon of Newfoundland in 1830, arriving in St. John's on June 18 of that year.

== In Newfoundland ==
Wix first went to Newfoundland with Bishop John Inglis in 1827 in his role as the Bishop's chaplain. H. W. LeMessurier, in a short history of St. Thomas Church, St. John's, describes him as an "indefatigable Missionary." Bishop Feild, in his 1848 Journal, had also described Wix as "indefatigable".

Wix frequently travelled around Newfoundland as part of his duties as a missionary, and reached southern Labrador in 1831. His best known missionary journey is recounted in his book Six Months of a Newfoundland Missionary's Journal from February to August, 1835.

Wix was also much occupied with fundraising, road-building, education, and the other social and political issues of his time. He was responsible for the construction of St. Thomas' Anglican Church in St. John's, Newfoundland, and was credited with persuading the Church of England to create the Diocese of Newfoundland and Bermuda, and to appoint the first Bishop, Aubrey George Spencer, in 1839.

According to Frederick Jones, "In October 1838 Wix left Newfoundland secretly and hurriedly, in a manner which, according to the Reverend Thomas Finch Hobday Bridge, “both surprised and appalled the members of the Church.” He left in poor health and in debt to the amount of £1,300, and after having been seen in the company of a prostitute." Aside from a few short periods working as a curate in the London area, Wix spent the rest of his life as an invalid. He and his wife lived in different places, moving to their son's parish, the Church of St Michael and All Angels, Swanmore, Ryde on the Isle of Wight shortly before Edward Wix died in 1866.

== Family ==
Wix married Fanny Browne (1809-1884) during his trip to England in 1828. The couple had two children born in Halifax (Fanny Wix (1829-1832) and Richard Hooker Wix (1831-1831)) and two in St. John's (Richard Hooker Edward Wix (1831-1893) and Mary Poynder Wix (1833-1833)). Only Richard Hooker Edward Wix survived to adulthood. He became a priest like his father and grandfather, and was the first rector of St. Michael and All Angels, Swanmore, Ryde. He was a noted ritualist and part of the Oxford Movement.

== Evaluations ==
Archdeacon Edward Wix's presence in Newfoundland and Labrador had a lasting effect in unlikely places. In 1848 the Bishop of Newfoundland, sailing on the Hawk, visited the Venison Islands (Labrador) and made the following entry into his journal.

The head of the other family is also an Englishman named Stevens, who married, as he said, a "sort of half Indian." I found, to my surprise, that this man had been married, and two of his children baptized, in the year 1831, by Archdeacon Wix, or, as poor old Stevens said, "by the head-man of St. John's." He could not remember the head-man's name; but the Archdeacon had kindly left behind a Prayer-book and Testament, in which he had written the names of the children baptized, with his own name and title. No person here can remember how the Archdeacon came or departed, and I have found no trace or remembrance of him in any other settlement on the coast. It would, I think, be a gratification to that indefatigable pioneer of the Church, to know that I read a chapter to the poor man and his family from the Testament presented seventeen years ago. The book is carefully preserved, and is not likely to be worn out by use, as none of the family can read.

— Bishop Edward Feild

Again in 1849

I should have mentioned that at Battle Harbour, and St. Francis Harbour, no Clergyman of our Church had ever been seen before; but it appeared that Archdeacon Wix had called at the Venison Islands seventeen years ago—or, as an old fisherman told me, "the head man of St. John's." He had married and baptized, and had left Prayer-books and Bibles with his name, and the names of the children he baptized, inscribed. I had the pleasure of reading a chapter in a poor fisherman's hut, from a Testament given so long ago by Mr. Wix, and bearing his name. It was well preserved, but, it is too probable, had never been used, for none of the family could read. They were indeed deplorably ignorant. I could not discover that Mr. Wix had called at any other place, or any other traces of his visitation.

— Bishop Edward Feild

Both entries in Bishop Feild's journal place Archdeacon Wix in Venison Islands, Labrador. Edward Jesse in Anecdotes of Dogs, 1883, recounts a story told about the Archdeacon's Newfoundland dog.

== Writings ==
- A Retrospect of the Operations of the Society for the Propagation of the Gospel in North America
- Six Months of a Newfoundland Missionary’s Journal 1836
- A Sermon: II Kings 2:19-22
