= Tompkins, Newfoundland and Labrador =

Local Service District in Newfoundland and Labrador, Canada

Coordinates: 47.817°N 59.200°W

Tompkins is a local service district and designated place in the Canadian province of Newfoundland and Labrador. It is in the Codroy Valley north of Channel-Port aux Basques.

== Geography ==
Tompkins is in Newfoundland within Subdivision A of Division No. 4.

== Demographics ==
As a designated place in the 2016 Census of Population conducted by Statistics Canada, Tompkins recorded a population of 114 living in 48 of its 66 total private dwellings, a change of -15.6% from its 2011 population of 135. With a land area of 6.25 km^{2} (2.41 sq mi), it had a population density of 18.2/km^{2} (47.2/sq mi) in 2016.

== Government ==
Tompkins is a local service district (LSD) that is governed by a committee responsible for the provision of certain services to the community. The chair of the LSD committee is Robert Parsons.

== See also ==
- List of communities in Newfoundland and Labrador
- List of designated places in Newfoundland and Labrador
- List of local service districts in Newfoundland and Labrador
