= Highlands, Newfoundland and Labrador =

Community in Newfoundland and Labrador

Coordinates: 48°10′00″N 58°56′00″W

The Highlands is a coastal community located south west of Stephenville, on Bay St. George, Newfoundland. The former Way Office was established in 1881, where The first Waymaster was John MacPherson in 1892 and Margaret MacPherson in 1897. Once a thriving agricultural and fishing community, Highlands is situated at the end of the Cormack Trail (Route 405). Home to families of Scottish and Irish descent, the community has been home to an active Catholic congregation.

The current population is estimated to be approximately one hundred, but there is also a significant seasonal population as many former residents return to the area in the summer months.

== Butter Brook Beach ==
Butter Brook is a fresh-water stream that channels into the Atlantic Ocean at Butter Brook Beach. Butter Brook was initially a beach where supply ships were serviced carrying goods from the UK and other European countries. One day, in the late 1800s, a ship carrying a cargo load of butter sank, causing the beach to have curdling butter drift on the edge of the rocks. The story is widely known amongst locals, and people who grew up in the Highlands.

== See also ==
- List of communities in Newfoundland and Labrador
- Greenock stowaways – rescued from the sea-ice in 1868 by residents of Highlands
