= Red Rocks, Newfoundland and Labrador =

Coordinates: 47°41′N 59°19′W

Red Rocks was a Canadian National Railway station northwest of Channel-Port aux Basques. It was closed and depopulated in September 1966. Starting in 1959, it was the site for a microwave station that connected Newfoundland to the Trans Canada Microwave service, via another station 127 kilometres southwest across the Cabot Strait at Cape North, Cape Breton Island.

== See also ==
- List of communities in Newfoundland and Labrador
