= Loch Lomond, Newfoundland and Labrador =

Former community in Newfoundland

Loch Lomond
- Former community
- Interactive map of Loch Lomond
- Coordinates: 47°48′16″N 59°15′46″W
- Country: Canada
- Province: Newfoundland and Labrador
- Region: Codroy Valley

Population (1956)
  - Total: 67

Loch Lomond was a farming and logging community in Newfoundland and Labrador near St. Andrews and between the Grand and Little Codroy Rivers.

The community takes its name from a small lake nearby. It had a population of 67 in 1956.

== See also ==
- List of unincorporated communities in Newfoundland and Labrador
