= St. Andrew's, Newfoundland and Labrador =

Settlement in Newfoundland and Labrador, Canada

Coordinates: 47.777°N 59.273°W

Location of St. Andrew's in Newfoundland and Labrador

St. Andrew's is a local service district and designated place in the Canadian province of Newfoundland and Labrador. It is in the Codroy Valley in the southwestern corner of the island of Newfoundland.

== Geography ==
St. Andrews is in Newfoundland within Subdivision A of Division No. 4.

== Demographics ==
As a designated place in the 2016 Census of Population conducted by Statistics Canada, St. Andrews recorded a population of 284 living in 136 of its 397 total private dwellings, a change of -6.3% from its 2011 population of 303. With a land area of 28.47 km^{2} (10.99 sq mi), it had a population density of 10.0/km^{2} (25.8/sq mi) in 2016.

== Government ==
St. Andrews is a local service district (LSD) that is governed by a committee responsible for the provision of certain services to the community. The chair of the LSD committee is Wilfred McIsaac.

== See also ==
- List of communities in Newfoundland and Labrador
- List of designated places in Newfoundland and Labrador
- List of local service districts in Newfoundland and Labrador
