= O'Regan's, Newfoundland and Labrador =

Coordinates: 47°52′00″N 59°14′00″W

O'Regan's is a village located north of Port aux Basques. It had a population of 110 by 1956.

== See also ==
- List of communities in Newfoundland and Labrador
