= Woodville, Newfoundland and Labrador =

Coordinates: 47.840°N 59.287°W

Location of Woodville in Newfoundland and Labrador

Woodville is a settlement in Newfoundland and Labrador. In the 2021 Census of Population conducted by Statistics Canada, Woodville had a population of 48.
