= Heatherton, Newfoundland and Labrador =

Village in Newfoundland and Labrador

Coordinates: 48°17′00″N 58°45′00″W

Heatherton is a village located southwest of Stephenville in Newfoundland and Labrador, Canada. It is a part of the Local Service District of Bay St. George South. The population was 244 in 1951 and 290 in 1956.

The primary areas of employment are farming and fishing. Heatherton has one hardware store, one general store, and two churches.

== See also ==
- List of communities in Newfoundland and Labrador
