= Millville, Newfoundland and Labrador =

Coordinates: 47°51′10″N 59°20′45″W

Location of Millville in Newfoundland and Labrador

Millville is a settlement in Newfoundland and Labrador near the Codroy Valley.

Formerly, people lived along the seacoast at Net Cove. The Gales and Jennings were the first families to move inward and start the community of Millville. There was a Catholic school built in Millville about 70 years ago. Some early teachers were: Elizabeth O'Quinn, Angela Blanchard, and Hughie O'Quinn. Another school was later built to replace this one. Today, however, school has been centralized to Upper Ferry and students from all over the Valley are bussed there to attend classes.

The community was based around fishing, forestry, and the wool industry. By 1921, there were 259 sheep being kept in Millville. By 1940, there were three sawmills in operation. As of 2023, weaver Megan Samms had set up a new loom shed in the community. Her goods are handmade on a variety of floor looms.

Millville is also home to Chap's Garage, a local attraction with vintage cars, gas pumps, and 1950s era collectibles.

== Gale Store ==
Alexander Gale operated a small grocery store in the community, where goods were bought on a bartering system. The first post office was kept in the store for 50 years or more. It was then taken over by his son, Afra. Edwin "Hockey" Gale was the third-generation owner of the store. In later years mailbox delivery was instituted. From circa 1980 to 2022 the Gale store hosted an annual Christmas Eve drop-in party for the community.

== Gale Carding Mill Registered Heritage Structure ==
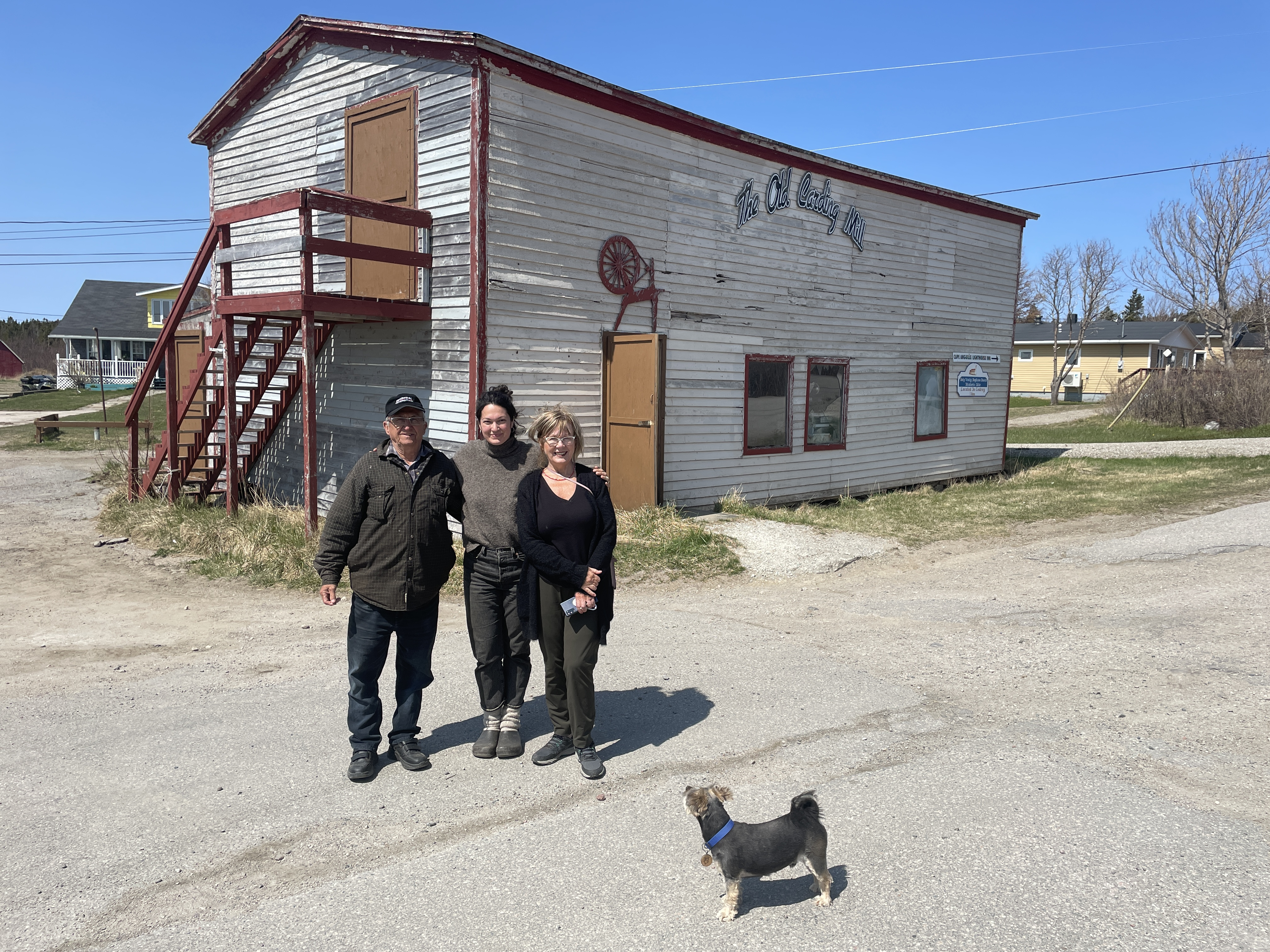
Gale Carding Mill Registered Heritage Structure in 2023, owned by the Gale family.

The community of Millville the community was founded in 1893 when Alexander Gale, a descendant of an early settler, moved inland from Net Cove, eventually establishing a carding mill near Grand Daddys Brook. In 1897, Gale purchased carding equipment in Canada, and brought it to Newfoundland, setting up what was said to be the first carding operation on the island. That summer, the mill carded 1000 lbs of wool. By 1911, the mill employed 3 people on salary, and it was reported there were five hand looms working in the community. The original mill was nearly lost to a fire in 1938:

Agustine Gale proved to be the hero of a fire which for a while threatened to be the end of Gale's carding mill at Millville. Going to draw some gasoline the lighted lantern was placed some four feet from the drum: When the tap was turned on the gas leading to the drum ignited. According as the gas flowed it burnt and soon the building was in flames. George Gale was on the upper story in charge of the machinery and both he and John Hynes joined Agustine Gale in an unsuccessful attempt to put out the fire. The boys abandoned the burning room, but Agustine Gale rushed back and carried the flaming cask outside. This daring feat saved the building, and proclaimed Agustine the hero of the hour.

For 50 years the mill was operated by water power, in later years the machinery was run by diesel. Circa 1940, the current mill was constructed further upstream along the road from the original site. By 1942, the mill was carding 30,000 lbs of wool a summer. The mill would operate for part of the year, typically opening June 1st after the shearing season in the spring until fall when all the wool would be carded.

The carding mill business was in operation from the 1890s to 1975. Alex Gale left the mill to his sons Edward and George, who ran the mill as Gale Brothers. The Gales also operated a mill in Stephenville before it was sold to a Mr. Gabriel; that mill was destroyed by fire circa 1941. The same year, it was reported that George Gale of Millville was moving to Curling to start a carding mill in that location.

At one point, there were as many as 16 carding machines in operation in the Codroy Valley region.

In 2023, the Gale Carding Mill was designated a Registered Heritage Structure by Heritage NL.

== Links ==
- Gale Carding Mill Registered Heritage Structure
