= Robinsons, Newfoundland and Labrador =

Village in Newfoundland and Labrador, Canada

Coordinates: 48°14′25″N 58°48′33″W

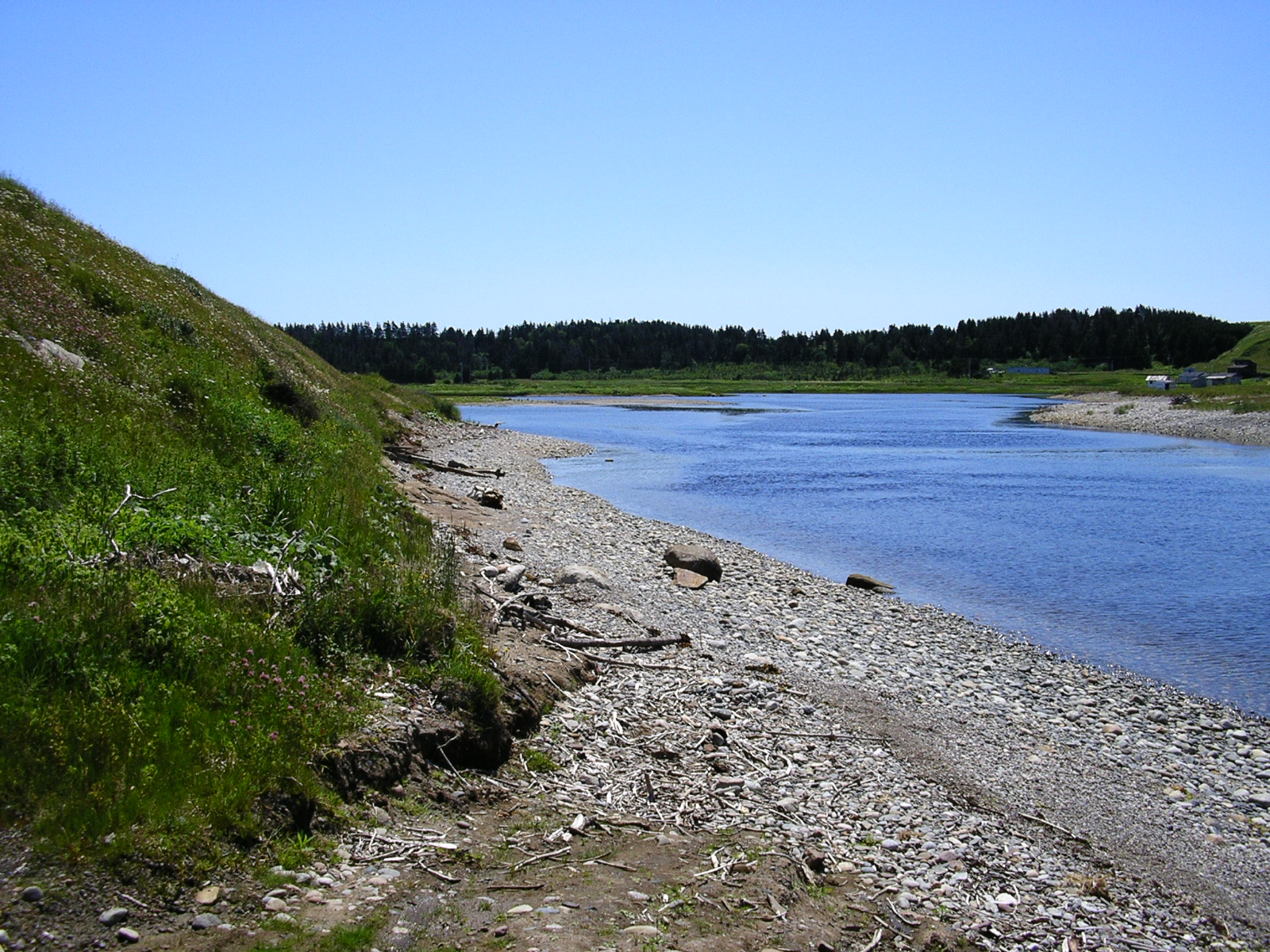
Robinsons Beach 2005

Robinsons is a village in the Bay St. George area of the Canadian province of Newfoundland and Labrador.

The headland of "Robinson's Head" was probably named in 1767 by captain James Cook. "Robinson's Station" about two miles from the original village came into being after the railway was constructed in the late 1890s and people, mainly those working at railway maintenance, settled in the area where the local road intersected the railway. The name "Robinson's Station" became simply "Robinson's" on October 1, 1960. Robinson's had a population of 299 in 1956. "Modern" Robinsons consists of the original Robinson's Head settlement (Robinsons), Robinsons Station (the rail-line settlement), and Robinsons Junction (small cluster of buildings at or near a road junction). For census purposes, all three are counted under the "Robinsons" name. The community is located along Route 404.

== See also ==
- List of communities in Newfoundland and Labrador
