= Loch Leven, Newfoundland and Labrador =

Settlement in Newfoundland and Labrador, Canada

Loch Leven
- Location in Canada
- Coordinates: 48°10′06″N 58°51′50″W
- Country: Canada
- Province: Newfoundland and Labrador

Population (1951)
  - Total: 35

Loch Leven is a settlement in Newfoundland and Labrador, Canada, near St. Fintans. In 1951, it had a population of 35.

In 2012, a proposed project to clear 100 hectares of land for agriculture was rejected.

== See also ==
- List of communities in Newfoundland and Labrador
