= Great Codroy =

Settlement in Canada

Coordinates: 47.839°N 59.266°W

Location of Great Codroy in Newfoundland and Labrador

Great Codroy is a local service district and designated place in the Canadian province of Newfoundland and Labrador. In 2016, it had a population of 69.

== Geography ==
Great Codroy is in Newfoundland within Subdivision A of Division No. 4.

== Demographics ==
As a designated place in the 2016 Census of Population conducted by Statistics Canada, Great Codroy recorded a population of 69 living in 30 of its 35 total private dwellings, a change of 6.2% from its 2011 population of 65. With a land area of 3.61 km^{2} (1.39 sq mi), it had a population density of 19.1/km^{2} (49.5/sq mi) in 2016.

== Government ==
Great Codroy is a local service district (LSD) that is governed by a committee responsible for the provision of certain services to the community. The chair of the LSD committee is AnnaLee Downey.

== See also ==
- List of communities in Newfoundland and Labrador
- List of designated places in Newfoundland and Labrador
- List of local service districts in Newfoundland and Labrador
