= McKay's =

Human settlement in Newfoundland and Labrador, Canada

Location of McKay's in Newfoundland and Labrador

McKay's is a settlement in Newfoundland and Labrador. The settlement was first settled by Ann Hulan in the 1760s. Its population as of the 2011 census was 1,298.
