= Cartyville =

Settlement in Newfoundland and Labrador, Canada

Coordinates: 48.238°N 58.805°W

Location of Cartyville in Newfoundland and Labrador

Cartyville is a settlement in Newfoundland and Labrador. Cartyville is located on the southern side of Robinson's River in Bay St. George. It was named after Michael Carty, the first member for the district in the Newfoundland Legislative Assembly. Cartyville was mainly a farming community and by the 1950s had become the largest potato growing area in Newfoundland. Almost all farmers in the community were members of the Cartyville Agricultural Society.
