= St. Fintan's, Newfoundland and Labrador =

Village in Newfoundland and Labrador

Coordinates: 48.184°N 58.840°W

Location of St. Fintan's in Newfoundland and Labrador

St. Fintan's is a settlement in Newfoundland and Labrador. American restaurateur, author, game show host, and television personality Guy Fieri visited the settlement in 2016.
