= Searston =

Local service district in Canada

Coordinates: 47.828°N 59.314°W

Location of Searston in Newfoundland and Labrador

Searston is a local service district and designated place in the Canadian province of Newfoundland and Labrador.

== Geography ==
Searston is in Newfoundland within Subdivision A of Division No. 4.

== Demographics ==
As a designated place in the 2016 Census of Population conducted by Statistics Canada, Searston recorded a population of 128 living in 58 of its 146 total private dwellings, a change of 6.7% from its 2011 population of 120. With a land area of 13.94 km^{2} (5.38 sq mi), it had a population density of 9.2/km^{2} (23.8/sq mi) in 2016.

== Government ==
Searston is a local service district (LSD) that is governed by a committee responsible for the provision of certain services to the community. The chair of the LSD committee is Dwayne O'Quinn.

== See also ==
- List of communities in Newfoundland and Labrador
- List of designated places in Newfoundland and Labrador
- List of local service districts in Newfoundland and Labrador
