= Jeffrey's, Newfoundland and Labrador =

Village in Newfoundland and Labrador

Coordinates: 48°14′N 58°51′W

Jeffrey's is a village located southwest of Stephenville on the west coast of the island of Newfoundland, Canada. It had a population of 1,174 in 2016. Jeffery's is a part of the Local Service District of Bay St. George South.

== See also ==
- List of communities in Newfoundland and Labrador
