= St. David's, Newfoundland and Labrador =

Settlement in Newfoundland and Labrador, Canada

Coordinates: 48.208°N 58.868°W

Location of St. David's in Newfoundland and Labrador

St. David's is a settlement in Newfoundland and Labrador.
