= Upper Ferry, Newfoundland and Labrador =

Settlement in Newfoundland, Canada

Coordinates: 47°51′N 59°15′W

Upper Ferry is a local service district and designated place in the Canadian province of Newfoundland and Labrador. It is north of Port aux Basques.

== Geography ==
Upper Ferry is in Newfoundland within Subdivision A of Division No. 4.

== Demographics ==
As a designated place in the 2016 Census of Population conducted by Statistics Canada, Upper Ferry recorded a population of 175 living in 77 of its 185 total private dwellings, a change of -3.3% from its 2011 population of 181. With a land area of 11.36 km^{2} (4.39 sq mi), it had a population density of 15.4/km^{2} (39.9/sq mi) in 2016.

== Government ==
Upper Ferry is a local service district (LSD) that is governed by a committee responsible for the provision of certain services to the community. The chair of the LSD committee is Robert O'Gorman.

== See also ==
- List of communities in Newfoundland and Labrador
- List of designated places in Newfoundland and Labrador
- List of local service districts in Newfoundland and Labrador
