= Codroy Valley =

Valley in Newfoundland and Labrador, Canada

Location of the Codroy Valley on Newfoundland

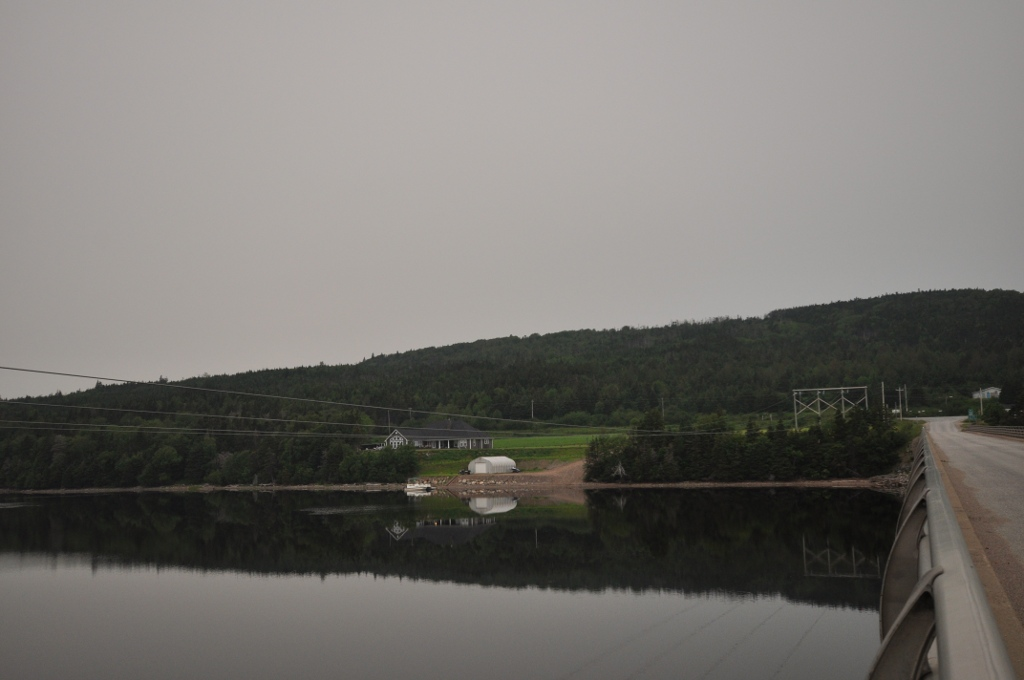
The Codroy River

The Codroy Valley is a valley in the southwestern part of the island of Newfoundland in the Canadian province of Newfoundland and Labrador.

== Layout ==
The Codroy Valley is a glacial valley formed in the Anguille Mountains, a sub-range of the Long Range Mountains which run along Newfoundland's west coast fronting the Gulf of St. Lawrence. The valley runs inland at a perpendicular angle from the coast along a bearing of 45° (northeast), carrying the Codroy River and its tributaries to the gulf.

The mouth of the Codroy Valley at the coast is extremely windy and is the location of Wreckhouse, so-named by employees of the historic Newfoundland Railway for the wind's ability to blow railway cars off the tracks.

== History ==
The area was settled families of French, Irish, Mi'kmaq, English, and Scots. The Scots were Highlanders who arrived between the 1840s and 1860s, most of them secondary migrants who had been living on Cape Breton Island in Inverness County, Nova Scotia. Of the roughly 171 households at Codroy Valley in the 1880s, 67 (38%) belonged to people of Scottish descent. The Scottish Gaelic language was once commonly spoken here, with some families continuing to speak Gaelic at home until the 1960s.

== See also ==
- Stormy Point, the headland just north of the valley's mouth
