= Émile Benoît =

Canadian musician (1913–1992)

- Born: March 24, 1913; Black Duck Brook, Dominion of Newfoundland
- Died: September 2, 1992 (aged 79)
- Genres: Folk
- Occupations: Musician, Fisherman
- Instrument: Fiddle

Émile Joseph Benoît (March 24, 1913 – September 2, 1992) was a Canadian fiddler who became known for popularizing Franco-Newfoundlander folk music traditions.

Born in Black Duck Brook, Dominion of Newfoundland, Benoît worked primarily as a fisherman for much of his life, playing fiddle mainly as a hobby and at local community events. After winning second prize at a fiddle contest in nearby Stephenville in 1973, he began to pursue music more actively, making it his primary career after his retirement from fishing. He became a popular performer, touring throughout Canada, appearing on 90 Minutes Live and in several documentary films, and performing in New Orleans, England, France and Norway. He released three albums and wrote nearly 200 songs during his lifetime.

His final album, 1992's Vive la rose, was recorded with Newfoundland folk-rock band Figgy Duff. He gave his final performance just two months before his death on September 2, 1992, in Stephenville. He was posthumously honoured by the East Coast Music Awards in 1993.

Musicians such as Kelly Russell, Noel Dinn, Pamela Morgan and Jim Payne have cited Benoît as an influence on their own music.

In 2009, Benoit's version of the song "Vive la rose" was the basis of a mixed media animated short of the same name, directed by Bruce Alcock and produced by the National Film Board of Canada.

He was the inspiration for College of the North Atlantic's 2015 intersession film project Emile's Legacy which detailed Figgy Duff's pursuit in convincing Emile to join them on a world tour.

== Discography ==
Albums

- Emile's Dream (1979)
- It Comes from the Heart (1982)
- Vive la Rose (1992)

Contributing artist

- Atlantic Fiddling (1979)
- The Rough Guide to the Music of Canada (2005)
