= Franco-Newfoundlander =

Franco-Newfoundlanders
Franco-Terreneuviens
- Franco-Newfoundlander flag

Languages
- Newfoundland French, Newfoundland English, Franglais

Related ethnic groups
- French Canadians, Québécois, Breton, Basque, Mi'kmaq Newfoundlanders, Acadians, Cajuns, French Americans, Métis, French

Franco-Newfoundlanders, also known as Franco-Terreneuvians (or just Terreneuvians) in English or Franco-Terreneuviens in French, are francophone and/or French Canadian residents of the Canadian province of Newfoundland and Labrador. The name Franco-Terreneuvian derives from Terre-Neuve, the French name of Newfoundland.

The Franco-Newfoundlander community is most prominently associated with the Port au Port area near Stephenville, in communities such as Trois-Cailloux, Cap-Saint-Georges, La Grand'Terre, L'Anse-aux-Canards and Maisons-d'Hiver. This region is unique as the only area in the province that is officially designated by provincial law as a bilingual district. However, francophone communities are also present throughout the province, particularly in St. John's, Labrador City and Happy Valley-Goose Bay.

Newfoundland and Labrador's francophone community and its culture derive from a unique mix of influences and immigrants from Quebec, Acadia, St. Pierre and Miquelon, Brittany and the Basque Country, much of it predating Newfoundland's admission as a Canadian province in 1949. Some aspects of the community's unique culture, however, have been lost or threatened as the community became more closely integrated into the mainstream of French Canadian culture and society after 1949.

== Flag ==
The Franco-Newfoundlander flag is based on the French tricolour and Acadian flag, with three unequal panels of blue, white, and red. Two yellow sails are set on the line between the white and red panels. The sail on top is charged with a spruce twig, while the bottom sail is charged with a pitcher flower. These emblems are outlined in black.

The sails represent early Basque, Breton, and French fishermen that came to the area in 1504. At the same time, they are symbols of action and progress. The yellow is taken from the star of the Acadian flag. The spruce twig is the emblem of Labrador and is also found on the Labrador flag. Newfoundland and Labrador's provincial flower is the insect-eating pitcher plant.

== History ==
Since the 16th century, fishermen from France have fished around Newfoundland. In the 17th century, the French established colonies in the coves of Placentia Bay and Fortune Bay and made settlements on the island's north coast, while the Basques used the west coast. French and English fishermen generally got along, but France and England both claimed Newfoundland and engaged in many wars over it, including the Avalon Peninsula Campaign, during which French forces burned English settlements on the Avalon Peninsula.

The Treaty of Utrecht required France to abandon its settlements on the island and recognize British sovereignty over it. However, the French were granted the French Shore (between Cape Bonavista and Point Riche), where they were allowed to fish. Most French settlers in Newfoundland left for Île-Royale (New France). The Treaty of Paris in 1763 ceded Saint Pierre and Miquelon from Newfoundland to France. As English settlers began to move into Bonavista Bay and Notre Dame Bay (both part of the French Shore), the location of the French Shore was shifted to between Cape St. John and Cape Ray. France continued to fish along the French Shore until 1904.

Although France was not allowed to establish settlements on the French Shore, some French people migrated to the region anyway. Migrants came from France and Saint-Pierre, while some Acadians settled on the shore. The highest concentration of French settlements was at Bay St. George. Some Mi'kmaq also settled alongside the French, many of whom had Acadian ancestry; however, many Mi'kmaq people hid their heritage and assimilated with the French.

In the 19th century, many English and Irish settlers arrived on the west coast, living alongside the French. Many French people concealed their origins and often adopted English names; for example, names like "Benoît," "Aucoin," "Leblanc," and "Lejeune" became "Bennett," and "O'Quinn."

== Language ==
Historically, Franco-Newfoundlanders were associated with the distinct Newfoundland French dialect. However, that dialect is now endangered, and most francophones in the province now speak either Acadian French, due to the influence of the Maritime Provinces, or Quebec French, which is the primary dialect of French instruction in schools.

The majority of Franco-Newfoundlanders, however, live their day-to-day lives partially or predominantly in English, due to their status as a small minority in a primarily anglophone province. In the Canada 2006 Census, just 650 people in the entire province identified themselves as being exclusively French-speaking, while 30,545 identified themselves as being of at least partial French descent.

Tony Cornect, the Port au Port region's representative in the Newfoundland and Labrador House of Assembly from 2007 to 2015, became the first Member of the House of Assembly in the province ever to take his oath in French when he was sworn into office in 2007.

== Media ==
Radio-Canada serves the province through rebroadcasters of its radio stations in other provinces, and does not originate any programming in Newfoundland and Labrador. CBAF-FM-5, Ici Radio-Canada Première's station in Halifax, Nova Scotia, has transmitters in St. John's and Port au Port, while Labrador City and Churchill Falls receive the service from CBSI-FM in Sept-Îles, Quebec. CBAX-FM, Ici Musique's station in Halifax, has a rebroadcaster in St. John's.

CJRM-FM was a short-lived community radio station in Labrador City that later operated rebroadcasters in La Grand'Terre and St. John's.

A provincewide francophone newspaper, Le Gaboteur, is published in St. John's.

== Culture ==
The community's main political and social organization is the Fédération des Francophones de Terre-Neuve et du Labrador.

One of the most famous francophone Newfoundlanders was Émile Benoît, a fiddler from L'Anse-aux-Canards.

Great Big Sea, a popular folk rock band from Newfoundland, included a cover of "Trois navires de blé", a traditional folk song associated with the francophone community of Port au Port, on their 1999 album Turn. Figgy Duff also recorded a number of French folk songs associated with the community, including "Quand j'étais fille à l'âge quinze ans" on their 1980 album Figgy Duff and "Dans la prison de Londres" on their 1982 album After the Tempest, as well as a song titled for Benoît, "Emile's Reels". A volume of Franco-Newfoundlander folk songs, Songs Sung by French Newfoundlanders, was published by Memorial University of Newfoundland in 1978.

The musical duo Port-Aux-Poutines is a traditional music group that celebrates the Francophone heritage of the province. They have received the very first MusicNL Award for Artiste/Groupe Francophone de l'Année in 2023.

== Other notable Franco-Newfoundlanders ==
- Claude Barrat
- Émile Benoît, musician
- Jacinta Cormier, musician and actress
- Tony Cornect, politician
- François-Gabriel D'Angeac (or Dangeac, Danjaique, Don Jaque), governor of Saint Pierre and Miquelon
- Danny Dumaresque, politician
- Mary Barry, musician
- Port-Aux-Poutines, musical group

== See also ==
- French Canadians
  - Acadians, French-speaking Quebecer, Franco-Albertan, Franco-Columbian, Franco-Manitoban, Franco-Ontarian, Fransaskois, Franco-Ténois, Franco-Yukonnais
- French language in Canada
- Newfoundland French
- Newfoundland and Labrador–Quebec border
- Franco-Newfoundlander
