= The Outhouse (comedy group) =

- The Outhouse cast members. From left to right: Markus Rose, Justin Hawco, and Michael Lynch.
- Notable work: Newfoundlander Vs.

Comedy career
- Years active: 2007 - present
- Genres: Satire, Newfoundland Humour
- Members: Justin Hawco; Michael Lynch; Markus Rose; Johnny Pike

YouTube information
- Channel: Jhawk23
- Years active: 2006–present
- Genre: Entertainment
- Subscribers: 37.8 thousand
- Views: 11.31 million
- Last updated: September 9, 2024
- Website: theouthousetv.com/password

The Outhouse is a comedy group from St. John's, Newfoundland and Labrador that became popular for their short skits that were originally posted on YouTube. The Outhouse is run by founder Justin Hawco. Their YouTube channel has over 37,800 subscribers, while their Facebook page has over 113, 000 followers and 79,600 likes, as of September 2024. The group has touched on many Newfoundland topics using satire, including poverty, tradition, alcoholism, news, politics, and pop culture.

== History ==
=== Early years ===
In 2007, Justin Hawco created his YouTube channel JHawk23, however it was not yet known as The Outhouse. That same year, Hawco, along with friend Justin Murphy appeared in their first video titled Two guys take three roman candles. The video featured Hawco and Murphy performing a stunt where the pair were shot with Roman Candle fireworks.

Two more short videos would be uploaded to JHawk23 before the group would upload their first skit, Two Guys Remake Aladdin. This short skit featured Hawco and Markus Rose lip syncing to A Whole New World from the Disney movie, Aladdin. Between 2007 and 2010 a few more short skits would be uploaded to YouTube, including the horror short "The Man Who Eats Kidz".

=== Newfoundlander Vs and rise in popularity ===
On July 1, 2010, Hawco would upload a video to his channel titled Newfoundlander vs Honeydew Melon. The short, unscripted, skit featured an unnamed "skeet", portrayed by Justin Murphy, eating and talking about how much he loved honeydew melon. This video would become the precursor to the infamous Newfoundlander Vs series, a series that is still very popular among fans today.

Newfoundlander vs Dinner would be the next in the series, introducing long time fan favourite character, Skip, portrayed by Justin Hawco. In this episode, Skip would refer to Murphy's character as "Buddy" which coined the previously unnamed character's name. Newfoundlander vs Dinner was quickly followed by the Halloween special, Newfoundlander vs Halloween. This episode introduced the character known as Da Youngster, this character was introduced as Buddy's child.

The fourth instalment of the Newfoundlander Vs series would be Newfoundlander vs. Da Flu. This episode introduced Newfoundlander Vs mainstay's Da Wife, portrayed by Justin Murphy; Johnny Butler, portrayed by Jake Murphy; and Cecil Butler, portrayed by Dan Keating.

The next Newfoundlander Vs instalment would become the group's most popular video on YouTube and still is as of January 2021, with over 380,000 views. Newfoundlander Vs Christmas was released on December 22, 2010, which was also the group's first Christmas special. This episode also introduced another Newfoundlander Vs mainstay, Dr. Tucker, better known as The Mainlander, portrayed by Mark LeMessurier. At this point, the Newfoundlander Vs series began moving in a linear story, with call backs to previous episodes.

Newfoundlander vs. West Side was the first video by the group to have celebrity guest appearances. This episode featured Canadian Idol stars Rex Goudie and Mark Day, playing themselves.

The Newfoundland Version of ET was another short skit released by the group which featured the first appearance of another fan favourite character, Troy Buckle, portrayed by Markus Rose. This short is also cited as one of the first official "Outhouse" videos. Between 2013 and 2014, the group also introduced a Newfoundland themed superhero series titled Blue Star Man, starring Markus Rose as Blue Star Man.

=== Not Quite ===
The Not Quite series were a collection of six shorts where the group did parodies and satirical public interviews. They were released between 2014 and 2015.

=== The Outhouse and Mike Lynch ===
The group was finally given a name in 2016 when Justin Hawco created a Facebook page called The Outhouse where he re-uploaded his old YouTube videos. He would also upload the group's new videos to this page as well as continue on YouTube.

2016 also saw the introduction to new member Michael "Mike" Lynch. Lynch's first appearance on The Outhouse was on a short called The Newfoundland Video Game, where he portrayed a Goulds Skeet in a Mortal Kombat parody.

Throughout 2016, Hawco and Lynch would popularize new characters, Rodney Lee and Randy Lee, respectively, in several more shorts. Lynch would also debut his character, Cecil O'Brien, another Outhouse mainstay, in a video titled Cecil Buys A Car; however, the character's first ever appearance was in a video published by Jeremy Nolan titled Weekend at Cecil's.

Lynch has also launched multiple nationwide comedy tours including The Taste of Home Comedy Tour, The Best Kind Comedy Tour and Getting To Know Me with Brian Aylward, Colin Hollett, and Lisa Baker. In 2018, Lynch sold out three shows at the Holy Heart Theatre, in St. John's, and also set the record at the theatre for the fastest sold-out show, at 20 minutes.

=== 2019 - 2021 ===
In 2019, Rum Ragged collaborated with The Outhouse in the creation of their music video Ladies Man, directed by John Pike. Justin Hawco and Michael Lynch both performed in the video. Lynch would take on the role of multiple female characters while Hawco would play one role. The music video won MusicNL's Music Video of the Year award that same year.

The Outhouse has continued to grow in popularity across the country. The group has been featured multiple times on CBC Television's Here and Now, and have been compared to older Newfoundland comedy groups such as CODCO and the cast of This Hour Has 22 Minutes.

The group has also partnered with the Quidi Vidi Brewing Company in the form of a sponsorship and the creation of The Outhouse Homebrew Session Lager

The Outhouse also regularly collaborates with members of Newfoundland folk bands Shanneyganock and Rum Ragged, as well as popular Newfoundland rapper Donnie Dumphy, on the creation of skits and videos.

In 2021, Lynch and The Outhouse launched the Show Mageddon comedy tour, with several sold-out shows.

=== The Outhouse of Horror ===
On August 25, 2021, The Outhouse announced the upcoming release of their first ever video special titled The Outhouse of Horror. The film is a collection of more than eight original Outhouse horror comedy shorts, starring Markus Rose, Mike Lynch, and Justin Hawco. The film also features special guests such as Donnie Dumphy, Shanneyganock's Chris Andrews, and Newfoundland premier Andrew Furey, as well as many other reoccurring cast members. The video special will also be the group's first ever pay-per-view release, available to stream online from October 15, 2021, to October 31, 2021. The group is also hosting in-person screenings of the film across the province some of which will feature cast members. The official trailer for The Outhouse of Horror was released on October 5, 2021.

== Filmography ==
Newfoundlander VS. Series

- Newfoundlander vs Honeydew Melon - (2010)
- Newfoundlander vs Dinner - (2010)
- Newfoundlander vs Halloween - (2010)
- Newfoundlander vs Da Flu - (2010)
- Newfoundlander vs Christmas - (2010)
- Newfoundlander vs A Hangover - (2011)
- Newfoundlander vs West Side - (2011)
- Newfoundlander vs Game A' Ball - (2011)
- Newfoundlander vs The Zombie Apocalypse - (2011)
- Newfoundlander vs The 12 Days of Christmas - (2011)
- Newfoundlander vs A Saucy Tucker - (2012)
- New Newfoundland Tv Shows! (Newfoundlander Vs) - (2012)
- Newfoundlander vs Newfoundland - (2012)
- Newfoundlander vs Halloween Pt.2 - (2012)
- Newfoundlander vs A Christmas Carol - (2012)
- Newfoundlander vs 2019 - (2019)

Films

- The Outhouse of Horror - (2021)

== Awards ==
| Year | Nominee / work | Award | Result |
|---|---|---|---|
| 2010 | JHawk23 for "Newfoundlander Vs Christmas" | Scope Magazine's YouTube Video of the Year | Won |
| 2012 | JHawk23 for "Newfie Problems" | Scope Magazine's YouTube Video of the Year | Won |
| 2019 | Rum Ragged and Michael Lynch for "Ladies Man" | MusicNL Music Video of the Year | Won |
| 2019 | The Outhouse | The Overcast's Best YouTube Series | Won |

== Recurring characters ==
- Buddy - Justin Murphy
- Skip - Justin Hawco
- Johnny Butler - Jake Murphy
- Cecil Butler - Dan Keating
- Troy Buckle - Markus Rose
- The Mainlander "Dr. Tucker" - Mark LeMessurier
- Da Youngster
- Da Wife - Justin Murphy
- Skip's Mudder
- DJ Dead Moo53
- Mark Day - Mark Day
- Rodney Lee - Justin Hawco
- Randy Lee - Michael Lynch
- Cecil O'Brien - Michael Lynch
- Nan - Michael Lynch
- Cabbage Gosse - Justin Hawco
- Bootsy Carter - Michael Lynch
- Moose Mitchell - Markus Rose
- Dicky Budgell - Shaun McCabe
- Donnie Dumphy - Leon Parsons
- Fetty Waps - Michael Lynch
- Puff Fadder - Brian Aylward
- Bay Kid - Markus Rose
- Mumbles - Justin Hawco
- Blue Star Man - Markus Rose
- Chelsay "The Bay Girl" - Michael Lynch
- Chelshayyyy "Bay Girl's Twin Sister" - Markus Rose
- Bay Girl's Dad - Michael Lynch
- Ryland - Michael Lynch

== Members ==
- Justin Hawco (2007–present)
- Markus Rose (2007–present)
- Michael Lynch (2016–present)
- Johnny Pike
