= Melissa O'Neil (album) =

Studio album by Melissa O'Neil
- Released: November 22, 2005
- Recorded: September–October 2005
- Genre: Pop
- Length: 41:26
- Label: Sony BMG
- Producer: Chris Anderson

Professional ratings
Review scores
Source	Rating
Allmusic	Link

Melissa O'Neil is the self-titled debut and only studio album by Canadian Idol winner Melissa O'Neil. It was released in Canada on November 22, 2005 through Sony BMG Music Canada. The album was produced by Rob Wells, Adam Alexander & Chris Perry, Jeff Dalziel and executive produced by Jennifer Hyland.

== Track listing ==
No.	Title	Writer(s)	Length
1.	"Let It Go"	Rob Wells; Alonso Wang; Rupert Gayle	3:20
2.	"String Me Along"	Chris Anderson; Frank Morell	3:25
3.	"Alive"	Wells; Lindy Robbins; Jess Cates	2:53
4.	"Kiss Goodnight"	Chris Perry; Adam Alexander	3:39
5.	"Just Like January"	Wells; Robbie Patterson; Ben Dunk; Mia Kulba	3:21
6.	"Forget About It"	Patterson; Perry; Alexander; Natasha Waterman	2:50
7.	"Driving Blind"	Xandy Barry; Perry; Alexander; Tebey	4:19
8.	"Speechless"	Jeff "Diesel" Dalziel; Waterman; Wang	4:05
9.	"Outside Looking In"	Perry; Alexander; Gayle	3:17
10.	"Original Girl"	Perry; Alexander; Jeen O'Brien	3:14
11.	"I Won't Take You Back"	Fred St-Gelais; Jasmine Baird; Ali Thomson	3:15
12.	"Safe Place To Hide"	Perry; Alexander; Melissa O'Neil	3:54
Total length:			41:26

== Singles ==
- "Alive" (October 2005)
- "Let It Go" (November 2005)
- "Speechless" (April 2006)
