= Tony Cornect =

Canadian politician

The Honourable Tony Cornect ECNL

Member of the Newfoundland and Labrador House of Assembly for Port au Port
- In office February 8, 2007 – November 30, 2015
- Preceded by: Jim Hodder
- Succeeded by: District Abolished

Minister of Service NL, Minister Responsible for the office of the chief Information Officer, Minister Responsible for Workplace Health, Safety and Compensation Commission, Minister Responsible for the Government Purchasing Agency, And Minister Responsible for the Labour relations Agency
- In office September 30, 2014 – March 12, 2015
- Preceded by: David Brazil
- Succeeded by: Dan Crummell

Minister of Tourism, Culture and Recreation, And Minister Responsible for Francophone Affairs of Newfoundland and Labrador
- In office July 17, 2014 – September 30, 2014
- Preceded by: Sandy Collins
- Succeeded by: Darin King

Personal details
- Born: Cape St. George, Newfoundland and Labrador
- Party: Progressive Conservative

Tony Cornect is a Canadian politician from Newfoundland and Labrador, who represented the district of Port au Port in the Newfoundland and Labrador House of Assembly from 2007 to 2015. He was a member of the Progressive Conservative Party, and served in the provincial cabinet as Minister of Tourism, Culture and Recreation and Minister of Service NL. He was defeated in the 2015 provincial election, in which he ran in the new district of Stephenville-Port au Port.

Cornect previously served as a town councillor and mayor in Cape St. George. He was also formerly a board member of Le Gaboteur, the province's only French-language newspaper. A fluently bilingual Franco-Newfoundlander, Cornect was the first MHA in the province ever to take his oath of office in French.

== Electoral record ==
2015 Newfoundland and Labrador general election
Party	Candidate	Votes	%	±%
Liberal	John Finn	3,262	64.8	–
Progressive Conservative	Tony Cornect	1,273	25.3	–
New Democratic	Bernice Hancock	499	9.9	–

2011 Newfoundland and Labrador general election
Party	Candidate	Votes	%	±%
Progressive Conservative	Tony Cornect	2,609	58.99%	–
Liberal	Kate Mitchell Mansfield	954	21.57%	

2007 Newfoundland and Labrador general election
Party	Candidate	Votes	%	±%
Progressive Conservative	Tony Cornect	3,936	81.22%	–
Liberal	Michelle Felix	910	18.78%	

By-election, February 8, 2007 resignation of Jim Hodder
Party	Candidate	Votes	%	+/-
Progressive Conservative	Tony Cornect	2,701	62.0	
Liberal	Mark Felix	1,521	34.9	
New Democrat	Paul O'Keefe	135	3.1	
