= Anita Best =

Singer, teacher, and broadcaster

- Born: Merasheen Island, Newfoundland and Labrador, Canada
- Genres: Folk
- Occupations: Singer, teacher, folklorist, archivist, broadcaster
- Label: Amber Music

Anita Best C.M. is a teacher, broadcaster, and well-known singer from the Atlantic province of Newfoundland and Labrador, Canada.

With Genevieve Lehr, Best collected the songs for Come and I Will Sing You: A Newfoundland Songbook, spending years travelling around the province collecting songs from anyone who cared to sing.

In 2015, the Newfoundland and Labrador Folk Arts Society awarded her their Lifetime Achievement Award.

Best was appointed a Member of the Order of Canada in 2011. The citation read, in part: "As a singer, storyteller and archivist, she has been active in collecting and performing the songs and tales of her ancestors, ensuring this priceless cultural legacy is not lost to future generations."

== Discography ==
Albums

- Some Songs (with Sandy Morris)
- Crosshanded
- The Color of Amber (with Pamela Morgan)
- Amber Christmas (with Pamela Morgan and others)
- Lately Come Over - Bristol's Hope
- Eleven Eleven

Contributing artist

- All The Best
- Another Time
- Rock Within The Sea
- Mujeres en la Musica (Spanish Release)
- Celtic Spirits II (German Release)
- Celtic Feelings (French Release)
- The Rough Guide to the Music of Canada (2005, World Music Network)
