= CJRM-FM =

Coordinates: 52°57′01″N 66°54′58″W

- Labrador City, Newfoundland and Labrador; Canada
- Broadcast area: Labrador City, St. John's, La Grand'Terre
- Frequency: 97.3 MHz
- Branding: Rafale FM

Programming
- Language: French
- Format: Community radio

Ownership
- Owner: Radio communautaire du Labrador Inc.

Technical information
- Class: A
- ERP: 456 watts
- HAAT: 4 metres (13 ft)
- Translators: CKIJ-FM 95.7 St. John's; CKIP-FM 96.1 La Grand'Terre

Links
- Website: rafalefm.ca

CJRM-FM was a Canadian radio station, broadcasting at 97.3 FM in Labrador City. It is a francophone community radio station branded as Rafale FM. Although still a licensed station, it has not broadcast regularly since 2015; this was due to a combination of technical and staffing problems.

On July 21, 2009, Radio communautaire du Labrador Inc. applied to add re-broadcasters in La Grand'Terre (CKIP-FM 96.1) and St. John's (CKIJ-FM 95.7). The CRTC approved the applications on September 14, 2009. The St. John's transmitter is reported to have launched in April 2011.

The station was the only broadcasting service in the province that originates locally oriented programming for the Franco-Newfoundlander community. Radio-Canada's Première Chaîne has four transmitters in the province, including Labrador City, St. John's and the Port au Port area, and Espace Musique has a transmitter in St. John's, although those services rebroadcast stations from other provinces and do not originate any programming in Newfoundland and Labrador.

On November 22, 2012, Radio communautaire du Labrador received CRTC approval to change the authorized contours of CKIP-FM La Grand'Terre, by increasing the transmitter's average ERP from 42 to 142 watts (maximum ERP of 250 to 632 watts) and to decrease the EHAAT from -17.6 to -37.6 metres.

The station is said to have stopped broadcasting in July 2018 due to technical difficulties with the studio and transmission equipment. The station faced controversy in 2019 when it was revealed that the station had continued to bill and accept payment for advertising that it had not aired. The CRTC announced an investigation into the allegations.

The station proceeded to close while after discussion with creditors. On June 12, 2019, Radio communautaire du Labrador Inc. has requested the revocation of the broadcasting licence for its French-language community radio station CJRM-FM Labrador City and its transmitters CKIJ-FM St. John’s and CKIP-FM La Grand’Terre. All station licenses were revoked by the CRTC on June 12, 2019 when the license renewal application was withdrawn.
