= The Rough Guide to the Music of Canada =

Compilation album by Various artists
- Released: 13 May 2003
- Genre: World, Canadian
- Length: 71:53
- Label: World Music Network

Full series chronology
The Rough Guide to the Music of Ethiopia (2004)	The Rough Guide to the Music of Canada (2003)	The Rough Guide to African Rap (2004)

The Rough Guide to the Music of Canada is a compilation album originally released in 2003. Part of the World Music Network Rough Guides series, it gives a wide overview of the music of Canada. Though contemporary styles are represented, the album focuses on roots revivalism, ranging from the traditional music of the Maritimes and Quebec to First Nations music and tracks representing Canada's wide ethnic range. The release was compiled by Dan Rosenberg & Philly Markowitz.

== Reception ==
Professional ratings
Review scores
Source	Rating
AllMusic	3/5 stars

Gregory McIntosh of AllMusic gave the album three stars, calling it diverse but nicely flowing. BBC Music Magazine claimed the album was balanced toward "updated Irish", and lamented the lack of "unvarnished" native music.

== Track listing ==
No.	Title	Artist	Length
1.	"Tshishe Manitu"	Zachary Richard & Florent Vollant	5:53
2.	"J'ai fait un rêve"	Hart-Rouge	3:14
3.	"Creation Dream"	Bruce Cockburn	4:03
4.	"Reel Béatrice (Béatrice (Oggi Nevica)/Seán Sa Chéo)"	Natalie MacMaster	3:36
5.	"Matapat"	Matapat	2:55
6.	"Dòmhnall Mac 'Ic Lain"	Mary Jane Lamond	3:34
7.	"Reel du Forgeron (The Blacksmith's Reel)"	La Bottine Souriante	3:50
8.	"Ed's Wake"	Zubot & Dawson	4:53
9.	"Bulkley Valley Home"	Bill Hilly Band	2:59
10.	"Ça va brasser"	Crystal Plamondon	2:50
11.	"Kelligrew's Soirée"	Anita Best	3:38
12.	"La Bastringue/Green Mountain Petronella"	Silk Road Music	1:59
13.	"Field Song"	Kanenhi:io	2:15
14.	"Rocks and Trees"	Wendell Ferguson	3:21
15.	"Seven (Northern Wish)"	Rheostatics	4:06
16.	"Le Papillon (Bourrée du papillon / Sans crier gare)"	Cordes en Folie	3:38
17.	"The Ballad of Gordy Ross"	Longbottom	3:15
18.	"Northwest Passage"	Stan Rogers	4:49
19.	"Vive La Rose"	Émile Benoît	3:22
20.	"The Black Fly Song"	Wade Hemsworth	2:59
21.	"Throat Singing"	Tudjaat	0:42
