= The Bills =

Canadian folk band

- Origin: West Coast of Canada
- Genres: Folk
- Labels: Red House Records; Borealis Records
- Members: Marc Atkinson; Richard Moody; Chris Frye; Adrian Dolan; Scott White
- Past members: Glen Manders; Nick Mintenko; Joey Smith
- Website: thebills.ca

The Bills are a high-impact, acoustic folk music quintet from the West Coast of Canada. Formed in 1996 (as The Bill Hilly Band), they have performed extensively throughout North America and Europe, with their strongest followings in Western Canada, the Western US, Ontario and the UK.

Though the lineup has had a few changes since the band first formed, the present-day Bills are:

- Marc Atkinson - mandolin, guitar, vocals
- Richard Moody - violin, viola, vocals
- Chris Frye - guitar, lead vocals
- Adrian Dolan - fiddle, piano, accordion, vocals
- Scott 'Grampa Bill' White - upright bass, vocals

The group has also toured and recorded with both Joey Smith and Nick Mintenko on bass; Glen Manders ("Reverend Bill Bass") was the bassist from 1998 to 2008.

== Awards ==
At the 2006 Western Canadian Music Awards, The Bills won the award for Entertainer of the Year. Their video for the song Old Blue Bridge was nominated for Video of the Year.

The Bills received a nomination for Roots and Traditional Album of the Year - Group at the 2005 Juno Awards

== Discography ==
Albums

Year	Title	Label
2000	The Bill Hilly Band	Independent
2002	All Day Every Day	Borealis
2004	Let Em Run	Borealis
2005	Let Em Run (US Release)	Red House Records
2012	Yes Please	Independent
2012	Yes Please (US Release)	Red House Records
2016	Trail of Tales	Borealis

Contributing artist

Year	Title	Label
2005	The Rough Guide to the Music of Canada	World Music Network
