= Rex Goudie =

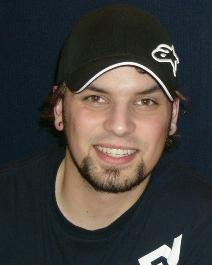

Background information
- Born: November 18, 1985 (age 40); Dawson Creek, British Columbia, Canada
- Origin: Burlington, Newfoundland, Canada
- Occupation: Singer/mechanic
- Instruments: Vocals; Guitar
- Years active: 2005–present
- Website: rexgoudie.com

Rex Goudie (born November 18, 1985) is a Canadian singer-songwriter and was the runner-up of Canadian Idol 3.

== Early life ==
Rex Goudie was born in Dawson Creek, British Columbia and moved back to his father's hometown of Burlington, Newfoundland, Canada with his family when he was a year old. His mother was born in Baie Verte, Newfoundland to a moderately affluent family. Goudie was studying mechanical engineering at Memorial University of Newfoundland as well as working as an auto mechanic part-time for his father's trucking company before Canadian Idol. He received his first guitar for Christmas 1996 from his grandmother.

== Musical career ==
Goudie's musical talents began in Sunday school, where he was encouraged by his grandmother Sophia to sing. By the time he turned sixteen, Goudie had formed a band with his friends, The Purple Monkey Bomb Squad, with a new rock/country focus. The band was moderately popular in Burlington, where they played in local bars after having received written permission to do so from his Grandmother. He was ousted from the band to make room for an older more "experienced" singer, Brandon Mitchell, when he was in grade 12. While frustrating, this inspired Rex to practice longer and harder, honing his skills that would eventually be used in Canadian Idol.

After all votes had been cast on Canadian Idol, Goudie finished as runner-up to winner Melissa O'Neil. On April 6, 2006, she and Rex confirmed in an interview with the CTV entertainment program eTalk Daily that he and O'Neil had been dating since the third week of Canadian Idol. They have since split up.

Although he has been criticized by some of the judges for his stiffness while on stage, a sports collision injury had caused him limited motion in both knees. Goudie missed a knee specialist appointment, in August 2005, due to his progress on Canadian Idol.

== Record deal and debut album ==
In September 2005, Goudie signed a major recording contract with Sony BMG. His debut CD Under the Lights was released on December 13, 2005, and debuted at No. 5 on the Canadian charts, selling 36,000 records in its first week. The album was certified gold in Canada 23 days after its release. In January 2006, Under the Lights was certified platinum by the Canadian Recording Industry Association.

== Canadian Idol performances ==
Songs that Rex performed on Canadian Idol include:

Week	Theme	Song(s)	Artist(s)
Audition	Contestant's Choice	"Folsom Prison Blues"	Johnny Cash
Top 32	Contestant's Choice	"After the Rain"	Blue Rodeo
Top 10	Canadian Hits	"Born to Be Wild"	Steppenwolf
Top 9	Songs of Stevie Wonder	"Pastime Paradise"	Stevie Wonder
Top 8	Eighties Music	"Every Breath You Take"	The Police
Top 7	Big Band	"Feeling Good"	Sammy Davis Jr.
Top 6	Week of Classic Rock	"Turn the Page"	Bob Seger
Top 5	Guess Who's Music It Is	"No Sugar Tonight/New Mother Nature"	The Guess Who
Top 4	Songs of Elvis	"Blue Suede Shoes" "If I Can Dream"	Elvis Presley
Top 3	BNL Week	"Brian Wilson" "Call and Answer"	Barenaked Ladies
Top 2	Idol Single; Contestant's Favorite; New Song	"Alive" "Bulletproof" "Superman (It's Not Easy)"	Rex Goudie/Melissa O'Neil; Blue Rodeo; Five for Fighting
Grand; Finale	Group Performance; Finalists' Duet; Favorite Song	"The Devil Went Down to Georgia" w/ Melissa O'Neil and Kalan Porter "Against All Odds (Take a Look at Me Now)" "Feeling Good"	Charlie Daniels Band; Phil Collins; Sammy Davis Jr.

== Post-Canadian Idol ==
On August 29, 2006, Goudie made a special guest appearance on the Top 4 results show of Canadian Idol season 4. After performing his hit single "Run", host Ben Mulroney presented him with an award for his platinum album Under the Lights.

His official biography Idolized, written by St. John's author Kim Kielley, was released in September 2006.

His second album, entitled Look Closer was released on December 12, 2006. The album made its debut at No. 19 on the Canadian charts, and sold over 11,000 copies in its first week. However, two weeks after its release, it fell off the top 100 chart.

In September 2006, Goudie, along with fellow Burlington native Shaun Majumder, started a foundation in their hometown to help raise money for medical needs. The Share Foundation has held several concerts, served with merchandise, and have raised over $50,000 Canadian dollars. The following month, Goudie appeared at the opening ceremonies of the 17th annual Provincial Student Leadership Conference of Newfoundland and Labrador, hosted by Laval High School, where he spoke about the importance of perseverance and getting involved in one's school.

In January 2007, it was revealed that Goudie would be travelling to the United States aboard a cruise ship, performing for the fans that decided to take a trip 'down south' with him. For a week, Goudie performed hits from his new album as well older hits from his platinum album Under The Lights.

In March 2007, he won a Canadian Radio Music Award for Best New Solo Artist (CHR) of the Year.

On Sunday, November 25, 2007, Goudie announced on his MySpace account the news that SONY BMG had indeed dropped him. He stated:

Here's what's goin' on. As most of you probably know, I've been dropped off of SBMG's roster. No biggie, I can survive.

After announcing this, Goudie quickly added that he is in Nashville working on songs for his new album. The album 100 Pages Later was released in December 2010.

In 2011 Goudie guest starred in JHawk23's short comedic skit, Newfoundlander Vs West Side, where he played himself.

Goudie also performed for the St. Anthony Come Home Year in 2017. That same year, he performed the national anthem at the close of the 2017 Tim Hortons Brier held in St. John's.

== Personal life ==
In early 2010, Rex travelled to Afghanistan to play for Canadian troops.

Rex currently works as a mechanic and is living life as a dad.

== Discography ==
=== Albums ===
Year	Album details	Peak	Certifications (sales threshold)
Year	Album details	CAN	Certifications (sales threshold)
2005	Under the Lights: Released: December 13, 2005; Label: Sony BMG; Format: CD	5	CA sales: 100,000; MC: Platinum
2006	Look Closer: Released: December 12, 2006; Label: Sony BMG; Format: CD, digital download	19	CA sales: 20,000
2010	One Hundred Pages Later: Released: December 7, 2010; Label: Fontana North; Format: CD, digital download	–	

=== Singles ===
- "Run" (2005)
- "Lie Awake" (2006)
- "You Got To Me" (2006)
- "One Good Reason" (2007)
- "Like I Was Dying" (2007)
- "Undone" (2009)
