= Port-Aux-Poutines =

Canadian traditional music group

- Origin: St. John's, Newfoundland and Labrador, Canada
- Genres: traditional music; folk music
- Years active: Since 2022
- Members: Jenna Maloney; Axel Belgarde

Port-Aux-Poutines is a traditional music group based in St. John's, Newfoundland and Labrador. It consists of Jenna Maloney and Axel Belgarde.

== History ==
Port-Aux-Poutines was formed in July 2022 during the 46th Newfoundland & Labrador Folk Festival, where musicians Jenna Maloney and Axel Belgarde decided to collaborate on a Franco-Newfoundland traditional music project.

The duo released their self-titled debut album on June 7, 2023. The recording features a mix of original compositions, traditional Franco-Newfoundland songs, and Francophone interpretations of Newfoundland songs. That same year, Port-Aux-Poutines won the first MusicNL Award for L’Artiste/Groupe Francophone de l'Année, a distinction created in 2023 to recognize the growing contribution of French-speaking artists in Newfoundland and Labrador.

In 2024, the group performed on the main stage of the Newfoundland & Labrador Folk Festival, confirming its presence among the most visible Francophone artists in the province.

Port-Aux-Poutines then released their second full-length album, Oui B’y, on April 25, 2025. The project continues the exploration of traditional repertoires and contemporary creation, consolidating the celebration of Francophone culture in Newfoundland and Labrador and Canada.

In the summer of 2025, the group expanded its international reach by performing at the Festival Interceltique de Lorient in France, where it represented the Canadian Francophonie as part of the theme "Les Cousins d’Amérique". During the same period, Port-Aux-Poutines performed at the televised National Acadian Day show, held in Charlottetown, then at the closing ceremony of the 2025 Canada Games in St. John's, strengthening its visibility on the pan-Canadian cultural scene.

The song Chapeau (French pronunciation: [ʃapo]) was also released in 2025 and was part of Manie Musicale.

== Discography ==
- Port-Aux-Poutines (2023)
- La Veille Du Réveillon EP (2023)
- Oui B'y (2025)

== Awards and nominations ==
=== MusicNL Awards ===
| Year | Category | Result |
|---|---|---|
| 2023 | Artiste/Groupe Francophone de l'Année | Winners |
| 2023 | Celtic/Traditional Artist of the Year | Nominated |
| 2024 | Artiste/Groupe Francophone de l'Année | Winners |
| 2024 | Celtic/Traditional Artist of the Year | Nominated |
| 2024 | Group of the Year | Nominated |
| 2025 | Artiste/Groupe Francophone de l'Année | Winners |
| 2025 | Celtic/Traditional Artist of the Year | Nominated |
| 2025 | International Touring Artist of the Year | Nominated |
| 2025 | Music Educator of the Year | Nominated |
| 2026 | Group of the Year | Nominated |
| 2026 | International Touring Artist of the Year | Nominated |
| 2026 | Ron Hynes Songwriter of the Year | Nominated |
| 2026 | Fan's Choice Entertainer of the Year | Nominated |
| 2026 | Album of the Year | Nominated |
| 2026 | Music Educator of the Year | Nominated |

=== East Coast Music Awards ===
| Year | Category | Result |
|---|---|---|
| 2026 | Children's Artist of the Year | Nominated |

=== Les Éloizes ===
| Year | Category | For | Result |
|---|---|---|---|
| 2026 | Découverte de l’année | "Port-Aux-Poutines" | Nominated |

=== ArtsNL Awards ===
| Year | Category | Result |
|---|---|---|
| 2025 | Emerging Artist Award | Longlisted |

== See also ==
- Poutine (dish)
