= Crystal Plamondon =

Crystal Plamondon (born in 1963 in Plamondon, Alberta, Canada) is a trilingual singer and performer of Cajun and country music.

Plamondon's birth town was founded by her great-grandfather. She began singing publicly at the age of ten but didn't record until 1990 when she made her own cassette. Plamondon lists her musical influences as Daniel Lanois, Zachary Richard, Dolly Parton, Sting, and Emmylou Harris. Her CDs include Carpe Diem in 1993, La Rousse Farouche in 1996, and Plus de Frontières in 2002. Plus de Frontières (English: No Borders) was nominated for a Western Canadian Music Award for "Outstanding Francophone Recording" in 2003. She speaks three languages: English, French, and Cree.

In 1992, she received the Molson Canadian ARIA (Alberta Recording Industry Association) Performer of the Year Award. In 1993, she was nominated for YWCA's Tribute to Women Award, for Arts & Culture. In 1994, Plamondon was given formal recognition of her talents by being made an honorary citizen of Breaux Bridge, Louisiana. Her music videos, Rendez-vous en Louisiane and Cajun Girl/ La Cajine filmed in Plamondon, Alberta, receive regular play in the southern U.S. and in Canada.

Plamondon had a television special filmed in Benin, West Africa and in her Alberta home in November, 1998 called Passeport Musique for Radio Canada. She has also performed live on Parliament Hill in 1997 for the Canada Day celebration; and on October 18, 2000, Crystal sang the Famous Five Anthem for the inauguration of the "Women are Persons!" monument on Parliament Hill to commemorate the day that women were declared "persons" in 1929.

Four of Plamondon's songs have been featured in the CBC TV show Heartland.

After living in southern Alberta and Louisiana, Plamondon is now living in the Plamondon area, and performs at the Calgary Stampede, local venues and at tour stops in Canada.

== Discography ==
=== Singles ===
- Carpe Diem! (1993) marked Crystal's first #1 hit "Capitaine" followed quickly by "On va faire le rigodon" in France.

=== Albums ===
Solo

- Carpe Diem! (1993)
- La Rousse Farouche/ Wild Red (1996)
- Plus de Frontières - No Borders (2002) This CD was nominated for a Western Canadian Music Award for "Outstanding Francophone Recording"
- On a Song and a Prayer / Une Chanson, une prière (2009)
- TORCH! (2010)
- Half Gospel, Half Heartbreak (2015)

Contributing artist

- Big Valley Jamboree (1993)
- The Rough Guide to the Music of Canada (2005)
