= Melissa O'Neil =

Canadian actress and singer (born 1988)

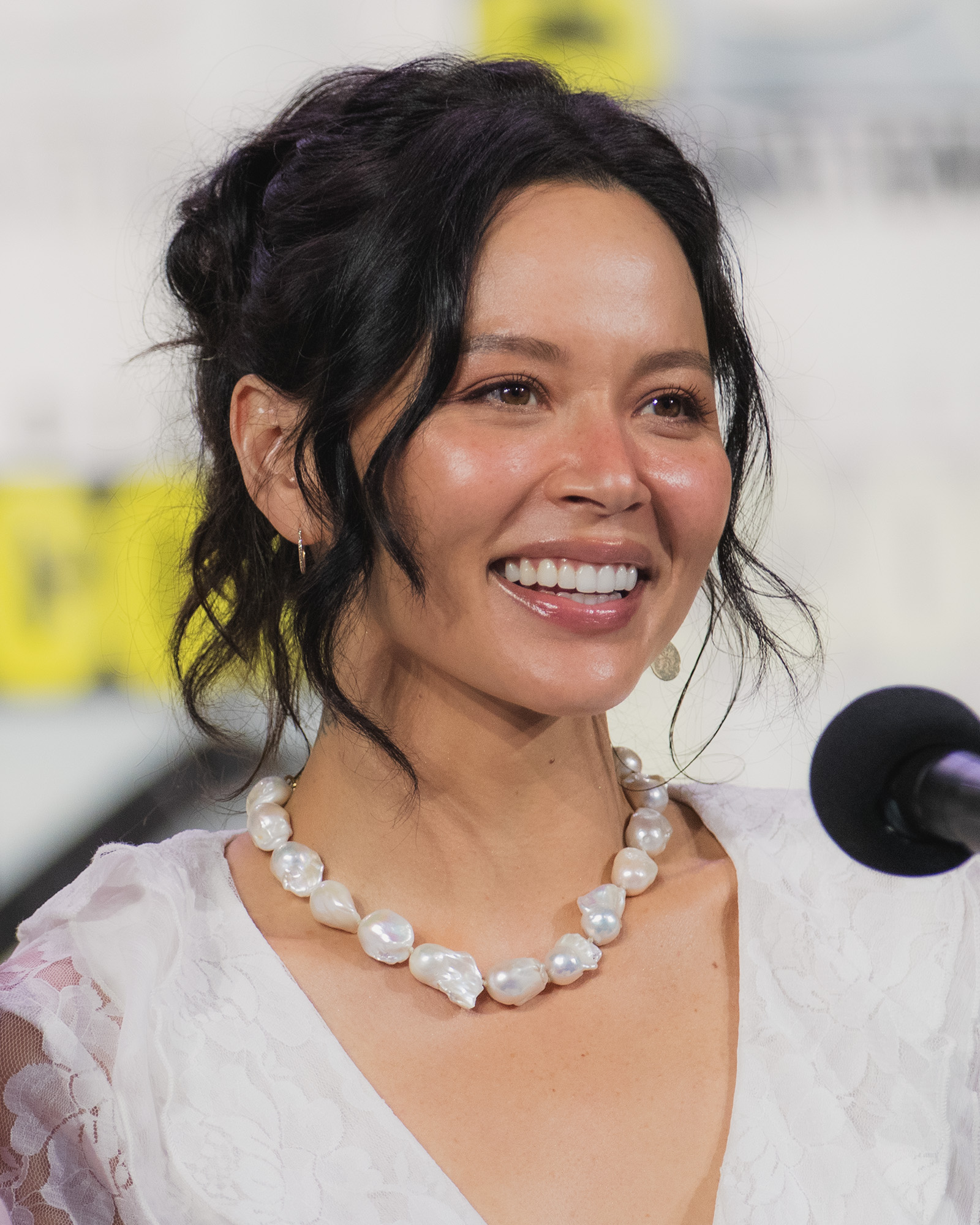
- O'Neil in 2026

Background information
- Born: July 12, 1988 (age 38); Calgary, Alberta, Canada
- Genre: Pop
- Occupations: Singer; actress
- Instrument: Vocals
- Years active: 2005–present
- Label: Sony Music Canada (2005–2007)

Melissa O'Neil (born July 12, 1988) is a Canadian actress and singer. In 2005, O'Neil won the third season of Canadian Idol. As an actress, she is known for her roles as Rebecca, Two, and Portia Lin in the Canadian science fiction series Dark Matter and as Sergeant Lucy Chen in the American police procedural drama series The Rookie.

== Early life and education ==
Melissa O'Neil was born in Calgary, Alberta, to a Chinese-Canadian mother from Hong Kong and an Irish-Canadian father. O'Neil attended Lester B. Pearson High School in Calgary, Alberta, where she performed in musicals, played rugby, and was on the basketball team.

== Career ==
=== Canadian Idol ===
In early 2005, while in high school, O'Neil auditioned for the third season of Canadian Idol. The judges were impressed by her vocals, and she made it through to the top 100 round. On the first day, she sang the song "Concrete Angel" by Martina McBride a cappella and again impressed the judges; but, on the final day of competition, she forgot the words to her chosen song and froze. Nevertheless, the judges were still so impressed by her singing abilities that she continued to the top 32. After scoring the highest number of votes in her semi-final group, again with "Concrete Angel", O'Neil was granted a place in the final 10 of the contest.

Although she was highly praised by the judges, O'Neil suffered huge setbacks in both the Top 10 and Top 9 weeks of the finals, as she was voted in both the bottom three and bottom two, respectively. Shocked by this, the judges urged viewers to vote for contestants like Melissa, who clearly had the best vocal abilities. From then on, O'Neil never fell back into the bottom three after delivering consistently praised performances, with judge Zack Werner declaring that she was "a threat to win the whole thing". On September 7, 2005, O'Neil made it into the final two of the competition, alongside Rex Goudie, and after more performances, judge Werner stated that the headlines of the next day's newspapers would be "The King [Kalan Porter] is dead, long live the Queen." During the grand finale results show on September 14, 2005, O'Neil defeated Goudie to be crowned the third Canadian Idol, as well as the first female winner, first winner of Chinese descent, and (at 17) the youngest winner in the show's history.

=== Singer ===
Immediately after her win on Canadian Idol, O'Neil received a congratulatory phone call from the Canadian Prime Minister Paul Martin. She then signed a recording contract with Sony BMG Canada and released her first single, "Alive", which hit stores on October 4, 2005, and debuted at number one on the Canadian singles chart, a position it held for four weeks. The single went on to be certified four-times platinum by the CRIA.

On November 22, 2005, O'Neil's self-titled debut album, Melissa O'Neil, was released on Sony and debuted at number sixteen on the Canadian albums chart. The second single from her album, "Let It Go," was released in late 2005 and peaked at number seven on the singles chart. On February 7, 2006, O'Neil embarked on her first solo tour in North Bay, Ontario, named the Let It Go Tour after her second single. Her support act was her Canadian Idol runner-up, Rex Goudie. The third single release from O'Neil's album was "Speechless", which peaked at number thirty-one. In March 2006, her debut album was certified gold by the CRIA for 50,000 units shipped, and her first single "Alive" was covered by Becki Ryan in the movie Flicka. On September 16, 2006 O'Neil returned to the Canadian Idol stage during the grand finale of its fourth season. Here, she was surprised with the certified-gold-presentation disc of her debut album.

In 2007, O'Neil was nominated for a Juno Award as New Artist of the Year, alongside Neverending White Lights, Tomi Swick, Patrick Watson, and Eva Avila (the latter, her Canadian Idol successor); however, Swick took home the award.

In 2009, O'Neil became the lead vocalist for the Toronto funk band God Made Me Funky.

As described by Glenn Sumi, of NOW Toronto, "After winning the third season of Canadian Idol... O'Neil released a best-selling disc and then promptly began doing musical theatre, with roles in Dirty Dancing, High School Musical and the acclaimed Stratford production of Jesus Christ Superstar."

=== Musical theatre ===
In the Toronto, Ontario, production of Dirty Dancing, O'Neil was a featured singer. In the Drayton Entertainment production of High School Musical On Stage (in St. Jacobs and Penetanguishene), O'Neil played the role of Gabriella. O'Neil's appearance as Martha/Maid by the Fire during the 2011 season's Jesus Christ Superstar was her Stratford Shakespeare Festival debut.

O'Neil was featured as a lead in the Stage West Calgary production of "British Invasion" alongside former lead singer of The Guess Who, Terry Hatty, and made an appearance in Camelot. She played Éponine in a sit-down production of Les Misérables in Toronto at the Princess of Wales Theatre, which ran from September 2013 through February 2014. She won the Dora Award for Outstanding Female Performance for that role.

In March 2012, O'Neil made her Broadway debut in Jesus Christ Superstar, where she played Martha, Maid by the Fire and worked as understudy to the role of Mary Magdalene.

In 2013, O'Neil was promoted to play Éponine.

In March 2014, O'Neil returned to Broadway in a revival of Les Misérables, where she was a member of the ensemble and worked as understudy for the roles of Éponine and Fantine.

=== Acting ===
O'Neil has been acting since 2015. She has had recurring roles in the 2015 CBC TV drama called This Life that was set in Montreal, the Cole Hauser TV crime series Rogue, and the musical drama web series, Lost Generation, which was set in Berlin. The show was originally called Pulse and had a book and score written by Duncan Sheik.

In December 2014, O'Neil was cast in the starring role of Two / Rebecca / Portia Lin, on the Syfy TV series space opera Dark Matter. It was a role she played from 2015 to 2017, for three seasons of the show.

In 2018, O'Neil played the role of Suki in The CW procedural crime drama iZombie created by Rob Thomas and had another recurring role in the thriller Condor, a TV remake of Three Days of the Condor.

In October 2018, O'Neil was cast in the role of LAPD Officer Lucy Chen in the ABC television police drama series The Rookie, where she plays a fellow rookie police officer opposite Nathan Fillion.

== Personal life ==
O'Neil's maternal grandfather gave her a Chinese name Ao Shimin (Traditional Chinese: 奧詩敏, Simplified Chinese: 奥诗敏, Pinyin: Ào Shī mǐn), which means ladylike. At the time when she was competing in Canadian Idol, O'Neil was said to be able to speak Cantonese, but not fluently.

== Discography ==
=== Albums ===
Year	Album details	Peak	Certifications (sales threshold)
Year	Album details	CAN	Certifications (sales threshold)
2005	Melissa O'Neil: Released: November 22, 2005; Label: Sony; Format: CD	14	MC: Gold

=== Singles ===
Year	Song	Canada	Certification	Album
2005	"Alive"	1	4xPlatinum (CRIA)	Melissa O'Neil
2005	"Let It Go"	7	—	Melissa O'Neil
2006	"Speechless"	31	—	Melissa O'Neil

=== Other appearances ===
Year	Song	Artist	Album
2005	"Concrete Angel"	Canadian Idol	High Notes
2005	"Whiskey Lullaby"	Rex Goudie	Under the Lights

== Filmography ==
Television and film roles
Year	Title	Role	Notes
2005	Canadian Idol	Herself	Contestant and winner on season 3
2010	Broken Hearts	Brandi	Film
2015–2017	Dark Matter	Two / Portia Lin	Main role
2015	This Life	Sarah	Recurring role (season 1), 7 episodes
2016	Rogue	Jen	Recurring role (seasons 3–4), 8 episodes
2016	Second Jen	Naomi	Episode: "Jenny Has the Gay"
2017	Ransom	Drita Jakupi	Episode: "The Artist"
2017	Lost Generation	Tasha	Web series; recurring role, 5 episodes
2018	iZombie	Suki	Recurring role (season 4), 5 episodes
2018	A Simple Favor	Beth T.A.	Film
2018	Condor	Janice	Recurring role (season 1), 5 episodes
2018–present	The Rookie	Sergeant Lucy Chen	Main role
2022	The Rookie: Feds	Officer Lucy Chen	Episodes: "Face Off", "The Reaper"
2026	Canada Day 2026 national noon ceremony	Herself	Co-host (with Julie St-Pierre)
2027	Stewie	Wanda	Voice, Main role

=== Video Game roles ===
Year	Title	Role	Notes
2016	Tom Clancy's The Division	Faye Lau	Main role; Voice
2019–2020	Tom Clancy's The Division 2	Faye Lau	Recurring role (Warlords of New York DLC, Season 4: End of Watch)

== Theater ==
- 2007–2009: Dirty Dancing
- High School Musical at the Drayton Theatre Festival
- Country Legends at the Drayton Theatre Festival
- 2010: British Invasion at Stage West (Calgary)
- 2010: Beauty and the Beast: The Savagely Silly Family Musical as Bella at Elgin Theatre (Calgary)
- 2011: Stratford Shakespeare Festival: Jesus Christ Superstar & Camelot
- 2012: Jesus Christ Superstar as Martha, Maid by the Fire and Mary Magdalene (understudy) at the Neil Simon Theatre (New York)
- 2013-14: Les Misérables: Princess of Wales Theatre
- 2014–2016: Les Misérables Ensemble and Fantine and Eponine (understudy) at the Imperial Theatre (New York)

== Awards and honors ==
- 2007: Juno Award, New Artist of the Year (nominee)
- 2014: Dora Award for Outstanding Female Performance for role of Éponine in Les Misérables

== See also ==
- Canadian rock
- Music of Canada
