= Rum Ragged =

Canadian folk music group

- Origin: St. John's, Newfoundland and Labrador, Canada
- Genres: Folk music
- Years active: 2014–present
- Members: Aaron Collis; Mark Manning; Colin Grant; Zack Nash
- Past members: Anthony Chafe; Michael Boone
- Website: http://www.rumragged.com/

Rum Ragged are a Canadian folk music group from Newfoundland and Labrador. They are most noted for their 2020 album The Thing About Fish, which was a shortlisted Juno Award nominee for Traditional Roots Album of the Year at the Juno Awards of 2021.

Originally consisting of accordionist Aaron Collis and singer/guitarist Mark Manning, the band released its self-titled debut album in 2016. They followed up with the album The Hard Times and a holiday-themed album titled Rum Ragged at Christmas in 2018, with new supporting members Anthony Chafe on bodhran and Michael Boone on bass and banjo. Chafe and Boone were subsequently replaced by fiddler Colin Grant and multi-instrumentalist Zack Nash in early 2019.

In addition to their Juno Award nomination, the band received two Canadian Folk Music Award nominations, including for New/Emerging Artist of the Year at the 16th Canadian Folk Music Awards. They have been nominated for several East Coast Music Awards, and won eleven MusicNL awards in their time as a band.

The band released their latest album, Gone Jiggin' in the spring of 2024. At the 20th Canadian Folk Music Awards in 2025, they won the award for Ensemble of the Year. Rum Ragged released their second and latest holiday album All The Bells and Wassails in the fall of 2025.

== Discography ==
- Rum Ragged (2016)
- The Hard Times (2018)
- Rum Ragged at Christmas (2018)
- The Thing About Fish (2020)
- Gone Jiggin' (2024)
- All The Bells and Wassails (2025)
