= Alive (Melissa O'Neil song) =

Single by Melissa O'Neil

from the album Melissa O'Neil
- Released: October 2005 (Canada)
- Genre: Pop
- Length: 2:53
- Label: Sony BMG
- Songwriters: Rob Wells; Jess Cates; Lindy Robbins
- Producer: Rob Wells

"Alive" is a pop song performed by Canadian Idol season three winner Melissa O'Neil. It was written for the final two contestants—O'Neil and Rex Goudie—of the third season of Canadian Idol, and both performed a different version of the song. When O'Neil won the competition, Sony BMG released "Alive" as her debut single in October 2005 (see 2005 in music). The single was produced by Rob Wells, who also shares the writing credits with J. Cates and L. Robbins. The single was recorded, engineered and mixed by Chris Anderson for Definitive Sound in Mississauga, Ontario. Executive produced by Jennifer Hyland

In "Alive", the narrator promises to live her life more fully. "Even if I crash down and burn out", she proclaims in the refrain, "at least I'm gonna know what it's like / to feel alive".

The song debuted at number one on the Canadian Singles Chart. It remained at the top for seven weeks and was eventually certified platinum for sales of more than 40,000 copies. "Alive" reached the BDS Airplay Chart top five.

No music video was filmed for "Alive"; its success was solely off O'Neil's win on Canadian Idol.

On the season 4 finale of Canadian Idol, Melissa was presented with a 4-time multi-platinum record for "Alive" by Craig Sharpe, the runner-up of that season.

The song was later covered by Becki Ryan for the film Flicka.
