= Mainland, Newfoundland and Labrador =

Canadian community

Coordinates: 48°33′52″N 59°10′52″W

Mainland (known in French as La Grand'Terre) is a local service district and designated place in the Canadian province of Newfoundland and Labrador. It is on the western shore of the Port au Port Peninsula approximately 50 kilometres (31 miles) from the Stephenville International Airport. Mainland is a coastal community, bordered by both the ocean and forest. The main industry in the community has traditionally been fishing, but currently (2016) a large portion of the inhabitants leave the community seasonally to earn income.

The community is home to one of six Francophone schools in the province, Centre Scolaire et Communautaire Ste-Anne (École Sainte-Anne), which serves students from kindergarten to grade 12. The school is adjoined by L'Association Régionale de la Côte Ouest (ARCO) and L'Héritage de l'Île Rouge.

The predominant religion practiced is Roman Catholic. The chapel (St. Ann's Chapel) is part of the Roman Catholic Diocese of Corner Brook and Labrador.

There is a small island clearly visible from the town, named L'Île Rouge (Red Island). Local folklore is that it was given the name, as it appears to glow red during sunset at a certain point in the year. The island is uninhabited and with the exception of birds, holds no wildlife.

The nearest towns are Three Rock Cove and Cape St. George. The nearest large shopping center is Stephenville. The nearest hospital is also located in Stephenville.

Mainland has the status of designated place in Canadian census data. In the Canada 2006 Census, the community had a population of 311.

The community is historically notable as one of the island's centres of Franco-Newfoundlander settlement and culture. In 2009, CJRM-FM, a francophone community radio station from Labrador City, applied to add a rebroadcaster in the community.

After a successful community fundraising campaign, Bell Mobility agreed to install a cellphone tower to serve Mainland and nearby Three Rock Cove.

== Geography ==
Mainland is in Newfoundland within Subdivision E of Division No. 4.

== Demographics ==
As a designated place in the 2016 Census of Population conducted by Statistics Canada, Mainland recorded a population of 314 living in 144 of its 156 total private dwellings, a change of -7.9% from its 2011 population of 341. With a land area of 11.28 km^{2} (4.36 sq mi), it had a population density of 27.8/km^{2} (72.1/sq mi) in 2016.

== Government ==
Mainland is a local service district (LSD) that is governed by a committee responsible for the provision of certain services to the community. The chair of the LSD committee is Sherisse Benoit.

== Amalgamation and incorporation ==
On March 2, 2026, the Government of Newfoundland and Labrador approved a request by Mainland and the LSD of Three Rock Cove to amalgamate together and incorporate as a new municipality.

== See also ==
- List of communities in Newfoundland and Labrador
- List of designated places in Newfoundland and Labrador
- List of local service districts in Newfoundland and Labrador
