= Le Gaboteur =

Canadian newspaper

- Front page of the April 20, 2020 edition
- Type: Biweekly newspaper
- Founded: 1984
- Headquarters: St. John's, Newfoundland and Labrador
- Website: Le Gaboteur

Le Gaboteur is a Canadian newspaper, published in St. John's, Newfoundland and Labrador. The province's only French language newspaper, the publication serves the Franco-Newfoundlander community as well as the nearby French territory of St. Pierre and Miquelon.

The paper was established in 1984 in St. John's by the Fédération des Francophones de Terre-Neuve et du Labrador, and moved to Stephenville in 1987 to be closer to the province's primary francophone settlements on the Port au Port Peninsula. The publication later moved its offices back to St. John's in the early 2000s.

Originally launched as a monthly publication, Le Gaboteur expanded to a biweekly in 1986.

In 2014, to mark the 100th anniversary of the start of World War I, the newspaper published a special edition commemorating the Franco-Newfoundlanders who had served in the war.
