= Pamela Morgan =

Canadian musician (born 1967)

- Born: Pamela Morgan; November 25, 1957 (age 68); Grand Falls, Newfoundland and Labrador, Canada
- Origin: St. John's, Newfoundland and Labrador, Canada
- Genres: Folk-Rock
- Occupations: Musician, Pop
- Instruments: Singing, piano, guitar, tin whistle, mandolin
- Years active: 1974–present
- Website: www.pamelamorgan.ca

Pamela Morgan (born November 25, 1957) is a Canadian musician, songwriter and owner of independent label Amber Music, now living in St. John's, Newfoundland and Labrador. From 1976 to 1995, she was lead singer of folk rock band Figgy Duff.

== Discography ==
Solo:

- 2013: Play On
- 2007: Ancestral Songs
- 2002: Seven Years
- 1995: On a Wing and a Prayer
- 1998: Collection
- 1997: Amber Christmas (with Anita Best)
- 1992: The Color of Amber (with Anita Best)

With Figgy Duff:

- 2008: Figgy Duff Live
- 1995: Retrospective
- 1993: Downstream
- 1989: Weather Out the Storm
- 1982: After the Tempest
- 1980: Figgy Duff
