= Black Duck Brook and Winterhouse, Newfoundland and Labrador =

Local service district in Canada

Coordinates: 48.6951°N 58.9122°W

Black Duck Brook and Winterhouse is a local service district and designated place in the Canadian province of Newfoundland and Labrador. It consists of the unincorporated fishing settlements of Black Duck Brook and Winterhouse on the Port au Port Peninsula. The communities had a combined population of 57 in the Canada 2006 Census.

The communities are closely associated with Franco-Newfoundlander history. The communities may also be known as L'Anse-aux-Canards and Maisons-d'Hiver in French.

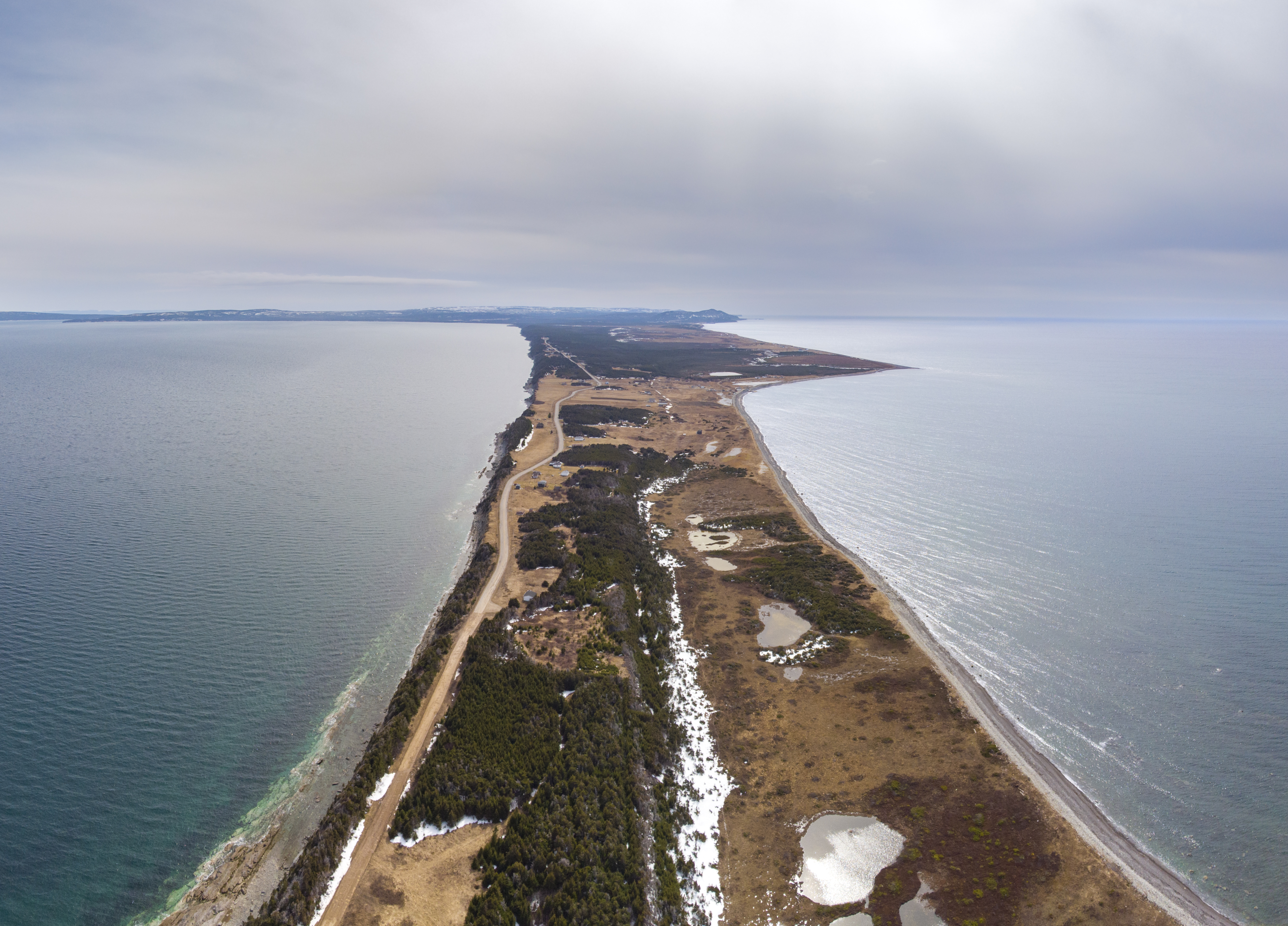
Black Duck Brook-Winterhouse aerial view

== Geography ==
Black Duck Brook and Winterhouse is in Newfoundland within Subdivision E of Division No. 4.

== Demographics ==
As a designated place in the 2016 Census of Population conducted by Statistics Canada, Black Duck Brook and Winterhouse recorded a population of 172 living in 82 of its 95 total private dwellings, a change of 48.3% from its 2011 population of 116. With a land area of 12.58 km^{2} (4.86 sq mi), it had a population density of 13.7/km^{2} (35.4/sq mi) in 2016.

== Government ==
Black Duck Brook and Winterhouse is a local service district (LSD) that is governed by a committee responsible for the provision of certain services to the community. The chair of the LSD committee is Bernie Duffenais.

== See also ==
- List of communities in Newfoundland and Labrador
- List of designated places in Newfoundland and Labrador
- List of local service districts in Newfoundland and Labrador
