= Figgy Duff =

Canadian folk-rock band

- Origin: Newfoundland, Canada
- Genre: Folk rock
- Years active: 1976–1995, 1999, 2008, 2016
- Label: Amber Music (1991–1995)
- Past members: Noel Dinn (1948–1993); Pamela Morgan; Frank Maher; Dave Panting; Geoff Butler; Philip Dinn (1949–2013); Art Stoyles (1943–2015); Derek Pelley; Kelly Russell; Sandy Morris; Anita Best; Jamie Snider; Bruce Crummell; Rob Laidlaw
- Website: Figgy Duff (defunct)

Figgy Duff was a Canadian folk-rock band from Newfoundland, Canada. They played a major role in the Newfoundland cultural renaissance of the 1970s and 1980s. Formed in 1976 by Noel Dinn, who named the band after a traditional pudding, Figgy Duff travelled across Newfoundland, learning traditional songs and performing them with distinct elements of rock and roll.

The band relied heavily on the research of ethnomusicologist Kenneth Peacock's 1965 3-volume Songs of the Newfoundland Outports as a resource for songs that they adapted into a new rock-based sound called “trad-rock” — an amalgamation of rock music and traditional folk music of unknown authors.

They began working with Island Records early, though the album that resulted has yet to be released. Instead, they released their independent self-titled debut album: Figgy Duff in 1980. The album was also released by Ottawa-based Posterity Records. It was followed by After the Tempest in 1982.

Through the next thirteen years, Figgy Duff continued touring and released three more albums: Weather Out the Storm (1989), Downstream (1993) and the compilation Retrospective (1995).

The band's line-up changed several times, but the core of Noel Dinn and Pamela Morgan, singer-songwriter, stayed the same. Weather Out the Storm was nominated for a 1991 Juno Award. Dinn died of cancer in 1993, and Morgan disbanded Figgy Duff soon after.

The band has since reunited three times, once in 1999 for a silver anniversary tour, again in summer 2008 to celebrate the release of a CD of live recordings from the bands' previous reunion, and for the 2016 Newfoundland and Labrador Folk Festival, featuring Aaron Collis on accordion.

== Discography ==
- 1980: Figgy Duff
- 1982: After the Tempest
- 1989: Weather Out the Storm
- 1993: Downstream
- 1995: Retrospective
- 2008: Figgy Duff Live Silver Reunion
