= MusicNL =

Canadian music trade association

- Abbreviation: 1
- Type: Trade association
- Region served: Newfoundland and Labrador, Canada
- Official language: English; French
- Website: www.musicnl.ca
- Formerly called: Music Industry Association of Newfoundland and Labrador

MusicNL (also spelled Music NL, previously known as the Music Industry Association of Newfoundland and Labrador, abbreviated MIANL) is a trade association for the music industry for the Canadian province of Newfoundland and Labrador. The 2006 MusicNL awards were presented in Stephenville. Danny Williams, the province's premier, presented the Lifetime Achievement Award at the 2007 MusicNL awards gala. In 2008, the MusicNL awards gala was held in Gander.

In 2011, the MusicNL awards were announced in St. John's between October 24 and 30. East of Empire was nominated for three awards, but didn't win either of them. At the 2012 gala, indie pop quartet Repartee won the awards in all five of the categories for which it was nominated. Tom Power, a CBC Radio host, introduced Repartee at the gala.

== Award winners by year ==
The following is a list of winners of the MusicNL Awards, organized by year. Category names and sponsor designations have changed over time. They are given here as they were used in the corresponding year.

=== 2025 ===
The 2025 MusicNL Awards Gala was held on November 15, 2025, at the St. John's Convention Centre in St. John's, as part of MusicNL Week (November 12–16, 2025).

Category	Winner
Album of the Year	Kelly McMichael – After The Sting Of It
Alternative Artist of the Year	Kelly McMichael
Classical Artist of the Year	Deantha Edmunds
Country Artist of the Year	Mallory Johnson
Electronic Artist of the Year	Andrew Gosse
Fan's Choice Entertainer of the Year	Justin Fancy
Folk Artist of the Year	Quote the Raven
Global Music Artist of the Year	XIA-3
Group of the Year	Nick Earle & The Reckless Hearts
Indigenous Artist of the Year	Deantha Edmunds
Instrumental Artist of the Year	XIA-3
International Touring Artist of the Year	Rum Ragged
Jazz Artist of the Year	Natasha Blackwood
L'Artiste Francophone de L'Année	Port-Aux-Poutines
Loud Artist of the Year	Smoke Signals
Music Video of the Year	Quote the Raven – "Already Gone"
Pop Artist of the Year	With Violet
R&B Artist of the Year	Zaynab Wilson
Rising Star of the Year	Evan Watts Smith
Rock Artist of the Year	Nick Earle & The Reckless Hearts
Ron Hynes Songwriter of the Year	Mick Davis and Thin Love
Side Musician of the Year	Hunter Madden
Solo Artist of the Year	Nico Paulo
Sound on Screen of the Year	Ian Foster
Traditional Artist of the Year	Jim Payne and Fergus O'Byrne
Lifetime Achievement	Dave Panting

=== 2024 ===
Music Celebration Week was held September 4–7, 2024, in St. John's; the Awards Gala took place September 7 at the St. John's Convention Centre, hosted by comedian Matt Wright.

Category	Winner
Album of the Year	Rum Ragged – Gone Jiggin'
Alternative Artist of the Year	With Violet
Celtic/Traditional Artist of the Year	Rum Ragged
Classical Artist of the Year	Iris Trio
Country Artist of the Year	Justin Fancy
Fan's Choice Entertainer of the Year	Jason Benoit
L'Artiste Francophone de L'Année	Port-Aux-Poutines
Folk/Roots Artist of the Year	Kellie Loder
Global Music Artist of the Year	Ana Luísa Ramos
Group of the Year	With Violet
Indigenous Artist of the Year	Summer Bennett
Instrumental Artist of the Year	Maria Cherwick & Jockey Special
Jazz Artist of the Year	Ana Luísa Ramos; Adrian House
Loud Artist of the Year	The Order of the Precious Blood
Music Video of the Year	Rum Ragged (dir. Roger Maunder)
Pop Artist of the Year	Rachel Cousins
Rap/Hip-Hop Artist of the Year	Albert Dalton
Rising Star of the Year	Andrew Rodgers; Len O'Neill
Rock Artist of the Year	Nick Earle & the Reckless Hearts
Side Musician of the Year	Hunter Madden
Solo Artist of the Year	Valmy
Ron Hynes Songwriter of the Year	Kellie Loder
Lifetime Achievement	Shanneygannock

=== 2023 ===
Music Celebration Week was held October 18–21, 2023, in St. John's; the Awards Gala took place October 21 at Holy Heart Theatre.

Category	Winner
Album of the Year	Nico Paulo – Nico Paulo; Jing Xia – The Numinous Journey
Alternative Artist of the Year	Youngtree and the Blooms
Celtic/Traditional Artist of the Year	The Navigators
Classical Artist of the Year	Bill Brennan
Country Artist of the Year	Mallory Johnson
Electronic Artist of the Year	It Could Be Franky
Fan's Choice Entertainer of the Year	Jason Benoit
L'Artiste Francophone de L'Année	Port-Aux-Poutines
Folk/Roots Artist of the Year	Darcy Scott
Global Music Artist of the Year	Baraka
Group of the Year	With Violet
Indigenous Artist of the Year	Jason Benoit
Instrumental Artist of the Year	XIA-3
Jazz Artist of the Year	Duane Andrews and the Hot Club of Conception Bay
Loud Artist of the Year	Da Slyme
Music Video of the Year	Rum Ragged – "Let Me Fish Off Cape St. Mary's" (dir. Cecil Johnson)
Pop Artist of the Year	Nico Paulo
Rap/Hip-Hop Artist of the Year	Albert Dalton
Rising Star of the Year	XIA-3
Rock Artist of the Year	Fairgale
Side Musician of the Year	Clare Follett
Solo Artist of the Year	Jing Xia
Ron Hynes Songwriter of the Year	Nico Paulo
Lifetime Achievement	Buddy Wasisname and the Other Fellers

=== 2022 ===
Music Celebration Week was held in Corner Brook; the Industry Award reception was held October 28 at the Corner Brook Civic Centre, and Music Awards were presented October 29 at the Corner Brook Arts and Culture Centre.

Category	Winner
Album of the Year	Nick Earle & The Reckless Hearts – No More Hiding
Alternative Artist of the Year	Swimming
Celtic/Traditional Artist of the Year	Rosemary Lawton
Classical Artist of the Year	Deantha Edmunds
Country Artist of the Year	Youngtree & The Blooms
Electronic Artist of the Year	Alex Byrne
Entertainer of the Year	Justin Fancy
Folk/Roots Artist of the Year	Kubasonics
Global Music Artist of the Year	Florian Hoefner
Group of the Year	Quote the Raven
Indigenous Artist of the Year	Deantha Edmunds
Instrumental Artist of the Year	Florian Hoefner
Loud Artist of the Year	Slowpoke
Music Video of the Year	Rosemary Lawton – "Little Fires"
Pop Artist of the Year	Rachel Cousins
Rap/Hip-Hop Artist of the Year	King Sway
Rising Star of the Year	Jing Xia
Rock Artist of the Year	Nick Earle & The Reckless Hearts
Side Musician of the Year	Dan George
Solo Artist of the Year	Rachel Cousins
Ron Hynes Songwriter of the Year	Kelly McMichael
Lifetime Achievement	Don & Kathy Weary (Sound Symposium)

=== 2021 ===
Music Celebration Week was held November 29 – December 5, 2021, in St. John's; the Awards Gala was held December 4 at Holy Heart Theatre.

Category	Winner
Album of the Year	Sherman Downey – New Beautiful
Alternative Artist of the Year	Clare Follett
Celtic/Traditional Artist of the Year	Maria Cherwick
Classical Artist of the Year	Ofra Harnoy
Country Artist of the Year	Carolina East
Electronic Artist of the Year	Virginia Fudge
Folk/Roots Group of the Year	Quote the Raven
Global Music Artist of the Year	Ofra Harnoy
Group of the Year	Quote the Raven
Indigenous Artist of the Year	Jason Benoit
Instrumental Artist of the Year	Duane Andrews
Jazz/Blues Artist of the Year	Ana Luísa Ramos
Music Video of the Year	Mallory Johnson & Twin Kennedy – "Wise Woman"
Pop Artist of the Year	Rachel Cousins
Rap/Hip-Hop Artist of the Year	Winnie Churchill
Rising Star of the Year	Matthew Hender
Rock Artist of the Year	Kelly McMichael
Side Musician of the Year	Maria Cherwick
Solo Artist of the Year	Kelly McMichael
Ron Hynes Songwriter of the Year	Kellie Loder
Fans' Choice Entertainer of the Year	Rum Ragged
Lifetime Achievement	The Flummies

=== 2020 ===
Presented virtually as "MusicNL Week 2020–2021" from February 1–7, 2021, due to the COVID-19 pandemic; the Music and Honorary Awards show was broadcast February 7 from the Canadian AV Sound Stage in St. John's, hosted by Petrina Bromley and The Once's Phil Churchill.

Category	Winner
Album of the Year	Rum Ragged – The Thing About Fish
Alternative Artist of the Year	Adam Baxter
Celtic/Traditional Artist of the Year	Rum Ragged
Classical Artist of the Year	Atlantic String Quartet
Country Artist of the Year	Justin Fancy
Electronic Artist of the Year	Alex Byrne
Fan's Choice Entertainer of the Year	Rum Ragged
Folk/Roots Artist of the Year	Rube & Rake
Group of the Year	Nick Earle & The Reckless Hearts
Indigenous Artist of the Year	Silver Wolf Band
Inspirational Artist of the Year	Kathy Stock
Instrumental Artist of the Year	Wade Tarling
Jazz/Blues Artist of the Year	Beauwater
Loud Artist of the Year	Qyn
Music Video of the Year	The Heavy Horses – "Weight in My Lungs"
Pop Artist of the Year	Rachel Cousins
Rap/Hip-Hop Artist of the Year	Albert Dalton
Rising Star of the Year	Justin Fancy
Rock Artist of the Year	Nick Earle & The Reckless Hearts
Side Musician of the Year	Dan George
Solo Artist of the Year	Sherman Downey
Ron Hynes Songwriter of the Year	Sherman Downey

=== 2019 ===
Awards presented during MusicNL Week in St. John's the week of January 27, 2020, at St. John's City Hall, following an eight-day state of emergency caused by a major snowstorm on January 17, 2020.

Category	Winner
Album of the Year	Jenina MacGillivray – Marion
Alternative Artist of the Year	Youngtree & The Blooms
Celtic/Traditional Artist of the Year	Rosemary Lawton
Country Artist of the Year	Carolina East
Electronic Artist of the Year	Galaa
Fan's Choice Entertainer of the Year	Dion Todd
Female Artist of the Year	Jenina MacGillivray
Folk/Roots Artist of the Year	Rum Ragged
Group of the Year	Quote the Raven
Indigenous Artist/Group of the Year	Eastern Owl
Male Artist of the Year	Nick Earle
Music Video of the Year	Rum Ragged – "Ladies Man"
Pop Artist of the Year	It Could Be Franky
Rap/Hip-Hop Artist of the Year	JYAY
Rising Star of the Year	Nick Earle
Rock Artist of the Year	Nick Earle
Ron Hynes Songwriter of the Year	Peter Smith (Youngtree & The Blooms – "She Found Me")
Side Musician of the Year	Dan George
Lifetime Achievement	Gary Graham

=== 2018 ===
The 26th MusicNL Awards and Gala was held October 14, 2018, in Twillingate.

Category	Winner
Album of the Year	Fortunate Ones – Hold Fast
Male Artist of the Year	Mark Bragg
Female Artist of the Year	Sherry Ryan
Fan's Choice/Entertainer of the Year	The Swinging Belles
Songwriter of the Year	Mark Bragg
Group of the Year	Rum Ragged
Rising Star of the Year	Rube & Rake
Pop Artist of the Year	Fortunate Ones
Alternative Artist of the Year	Mark Bragg
Video of the Year	Fortunate Ones – "Northern Star"
Traditional Artist of the Year	Rum Ragged
Folk/Roots Artist of the Year	Rube & Rake
Jazz/Blues Artist of the Year	Earle and Coffin
Rap/Hip-Hop Artist of the Year	ChessClub
Rock Artist of the Year	Mick Davis and Thin Love
Country Artist of the Year	Carolina East
Electronic Artist of the Year	Game Boy
Instrumental Artist/Group of the Year	Ouroboros
Lifetime Achievement	Ralph O'Brien

=== 2017 ===
The 25th Anniversary Show was held October 15, 2017, at the St. John's Convention Centre, hosted by Alan Doyle.

Category	Winner
Album of the Year	Janet Cull – Real Tough Love
Alternative Artist of the Year	Steve Maloney
Celtic/Traditional Artist of the Year	Rum Ragged
Country Artist of the Year	Steve Maloney
Fans' Choice Entertainer of the Year	The Kubasonics
Female Artist of the Year	Janet Cull
Folk/Roots Artist of the Year	The Kubasonics
Group of the Year	The Kubasonics
Instrumental Artist of the Year	Fretboard Journey
Male Artist of the Year	Mick Davis
Pop/Rock Artist of the Year	Janet Cull
Rap/Hip-Hop Artist of the Year	JYAY
Rising Star of the Year	Clare Follett; Town House
Ron Hynes Songwriter of the Year	Steve Maloney
Electronic Artist of the Year	Happy Beats
Music Video of the Year	Kellie Loder – "Boxes"
Jazz/Blues Artist of the Year	Earle & Coffin
Side Musician of the Year	Darren "Boobie" Browne
Lifetime Achievement	Glen Tilley

=== 2016 ===
MusicNL Week was held October 13–16, 2016, in Bonavista; the Awards Gala was held October 16.

Category	Winner
Album of the Year	Repartee
Alternative Recording of the Year	Cabbages and Kings
Country Recording of the Year	Peter Willie Youngtree
Entertainer of the Year	Everglow
Female Artist of the Year	Rozalind MacPhail
Folk/Roots Recording of the Year	Rum Ragged
Group of the Year	Repartee
Instrumental Recording of the Year	Ewan Dobson
Jazz/Blues Recording of the Year	Duane Andrews
Male Artist of the Year	Duane Andrews
Music Video of the Year	Repartee; Cabbages and Kings
Pop/Rock Recording of the Year	Repartee
Rising Star of the Year	Waterfront Fire
Ron Hynes Songwriter of the Year	Chris Kirby
Urban/Electronic Artist of the Year	It Could Be Franky
Lifetime Achievement	Sandy Morris

=== 2015 ===
Awards presented October 18, 2015, at an awards brunch at the Delta Hotel, St. John's.

Category	Winner
Album of the Year	Fortunate Ones – The Bliss
Alternative Recording of the Year	Waterfront Fire – First Light
Celtic/Traditional Recording of the Year	Aaron Collis and Duane Andrews – The Mallard Cottage Sessions
Country Recording of the Year	Dave McHugh
Entertainer of the Year	The Once
Female Artist of the Year	Kat McLevey
Folk/Roots Recording of the Year	Fortunate Ones
Group of the Year	Fortunate Ones
Instrumental Recording of the Year	Ouroboros
Jazz/Blues Recording of the Year	Denis Parker and the Modern Saints
Male Artist of the Year	Jerry Stamp
Music Video of the Year	The Once – "We Are All Running"
Pop/Rock Recording of the Year	Mick Davis
Rising Star of the Year	Kat McLevey
Songwriter of the Year	Fortunate Ones
Lifetime Achievement	Harry Martin

=== 2014 ===
Awards show held October 26, 2014, in Corner Brook.

Category	Winner
Factor Album of the Year	Brianna Gosse – Aera
Group of the Year	The Once
Female Artist of the Year	Brianna Gosse
Male Artist of the Year	Mick Davis
Songwriter of the Year	Sherman Downey
Rising Star of the Year	Steve Maloney and the Wandering Kind
Music Video of the Year	Chris Kirby – "Leave of Absence" (dir. Don-E Coady)
Alternative Artist of the Year	Cabbages and Kings
Celtic/Traditional Recording of the Year	Aaron Collis & Emilia Bartellas
Classical Recording of the Year	Rob Power
Country Recording of the Year	The Secrets
Folk/Roots Recording of the Year	The Once
Gospel Recording of the Year	Dan Bursey
Instrumental Recording of the Year	Duane Andrews & Craig Young
Jazz/Blues Recording of the Year	The Hip Waders
Loud Recording of the Year	Monsterbator
Pop/Rock Recording of the Year	Sherman Downey & The Ambiguous Case
Urban/Electronic Recording of the Year	Hear/Say
Unsung Hero Award	Paul Heppleston
Industry Builder Award	Shirley Montague
Lifetime Achievement Award	Mattis Benoit

=== 2013 ===
Music Awards presented Sunday night at the Arts and Culture Centre in Gander; Industry Awards presented the previous night, also in Gander.

Category	Winner
Album of the Year	Ennis – The Fortunate Ones
Alternative Artist/Group of the Year	Idlers – Idlers
Celtic/Traditional Artist/Group of the Year	Ennis Sisters – It's Christmas
Classical Artist/Group of the Year	Lady Cove Women's Choir – Heart's Delight
Country Artist/Group of the Year	Craig Young – Black Diamond Strings
Entertainer of the Year	The Once
Fan's Choice Album of the Year	The Rolling Kings – Raise a Glass
Female Artist of the Year	Amelia Curran – Spectators
Folk/Roots Artist/Group of the Year	Amelia Curran – Spectators
Gospel Artist/Group of the Year	Dan Bursey – Priceless
Group of the Year	Ennis – The Fortunate Ones
Instrumental Artist/Group of the Year	Gordon Quinton – A Guitar's Story
Male Artist of the Year	Chris Picco – The Beach
Pop/Rock Artist/Group of the Year	RocketRocketShip – Your Best Kept Secret
Rising Star New Artist/Group of the Year	Adam McGrath & The Tearjerkers – My Colour Red
Side Musician of the Year	Craig Young
Songwriter of the Year	Amelia Curran – "Years"
Urban/Electronic Artist/Group of the Year	Blair Goudie – Death Beach Boat Club
Lifetime Achievement	Maxine Stanley
Industry Builder	Dean Stairs

=== 2012 ===
Awards presented October 14, 2012, in St. John's.

Category	Winner
Album of the Year	Repartee – Repartee
Alternative Artist/Group of the Year	Mark Bragg – "Your Kiss"
Celtic/Traditional Artist/Group of the Year	The Dardanelles – The Eastern Light
Country Artist/Group of the Year	Terry Penney – The Last Guitar
Fan's Choice Entertainer of the Year	Repartee
Female Artist of the Year	Katie Baggs – Home Again Home Again
Folk/Roots Artist/Group of the Year	The Once – Row Upon Row of the People They Know
Gospel Artist/Group of the Year	Dan Bursey – "Spread Your Love"
Group of the Year	Repartee
Jazz/Blues Artist/Group of the Year	Dwayne Cote and Duane Andrews – The Empress
Male Artist of the Year	Chris Kirby – Wonderizer
Pop/Rock Artist/Group of the Year	Repartee – Repartee
Rising Star New Artist/Group of the Year	Repartee
Side Musician of the Year	Sandy Morris
Songwriter of the Year	Chris Kirby – "Waiting So Long"

=== 2011 ===
Winners were announced in St. John's between October 24 and 30, 2011.

Category	Winner
Album of the Year	Hey Rosetta! – Seeds
Alternative Album of the Year	Hey Rosetta!
Celtic-Traditional Artist of the Year	Shanneyganock
Country Artist of the Year	Craig Young
Entertainer of the Year (fan-voted)	Shanneyganock
Female Singer of the Year	Colleen Power (with Crooked Stovepipe)
Folk/Roots Artist of the Year	Ron Hynes
Gospel Artist of the Year	Dan Bursey
Group of the Year	Hey Rosetta!
Male Artist of the Year	Andrew James O'Brien – Songs For Searchers
Pop-Rock Artist/Group of the Year	Andrew James O'Brien
Rising Star of the Year	Andrew James O'Brien
Side Musician of the Year	Sandy Morris
Songwriting Award	Hey Rosetta! – "Yer Spring"
Industry Builder	Fred's Records

=== 2010 ===
The 19th Annual MusicNL Conference & Awards was hosted by Rocky Harbour/Gros Morne National Park, October 22–24, 2010; the Awards Gala was held October 24 at Gros Morne Academy.

Category	Winner
Album of the Year	Amelia Curran – Hunter, Hunter
Female Artist of the Year	Amelia Curran
Songwriter of the Year	Amelia Curran – "The Mistress"
Folk/Roots Artist/Group of the Year	Amelia Curran
Male Artist of the Year	Sherman Downey
Group of the Year	Matthew Hornell and the Diamond Minds
Pop/Rock Artist/Group of the Year	Matthew Hornell and the Diamond Minds
Entertainer of the Year	Matthew Hornell and the Diamond Minds
Rising Star New Artist/Group of the Year	Matthew Hornell and the Diamond Minds
Instrumental Group/Artist of the Year	Duane Andrews & Dwayne Cote
Country Artist/Group of the Year	Joe Belly
Alternative Artist/Group of the Year	Pathological Lovers
Gospel Artist/Group of the Year	Jerry Stamp
Side Musician Award	Sandy Morris

=== 2009 ===
Presented at the MUSICNL gala held November 15, 2009, in St. John's.

Category	Winner
Album of the Year	The Once
Rising Star	The Once
Folk Roots Group	The Once
Group of the Year	The Once
Male Artist	Curtis Andrews
Instrumental Artist	Curtis Andrews
Female Artist	Karla Pilgrim
Country Artist	Karla Pilgrim
Entertainer of the Year	Shanneyganock
Best Pop Rock Group	The Novaks
Alternative Artist of the Year	Colleen Power
Jazz and Blues Award	Chris Kirby
Gospel Award	Rod Jackson

=== 2008 ===
MusicNL awards show held in Gander, in the first week of November 2008.

Category	Winner
Male Artist of the Year	Duane Andrews
Galaxie Rising Star of the CBC Award	The Idlers
Country Artist/Group of the Year	Joe Belly & the Sin City Ramblers
Gospel Artist/Group of the Year	Janet Cull & Kelly-Ann Evans
Instrumental Artist/Group of the Year	Bill Brennan
Album of the Year	Duane Andrews – Raindrops
Side Musician of the Year	Patrick Boyle
Female Artist of the Year	Sherry Ryan
Entertainer of the Year	Hey Rosetta!
Pop/Rock Artist/Group of the Year	Hey Rosetta!
Folk/Roots Artist/Group of the Year	Graham Wells
Group of the Year	Hey Rosetta!
Alternative Artist/Group of the Year	The Idlers
Jazz/Blues Artist/Group of the Year	Duane Andrews
Songwriter of the Year	Duane Andrews – "D.D's Blues"
Lifetime Achievement	Simani (Bud Davidge and Sim Savory)

=== 2007 ===
Gala held October 28, 2007, in St. John's, concluding that year's annual meeting. The evening included a tribute to Dermot O'Reilly, the Ryan's Fancy co-founder and songwriter, who died in February of that year; then-premier Danny Williams presented the Lifetime Achievement Award to O'Reilly's family.

Category	Winner
Album of the Year (tie)	Shanneyganock – Fling Out the Flag; The Cormiers
Group of the Year	Shanneyganock
Entertainer of the Year	Shanneyganock
Folk-Roots Artist of the Year	Shanneyganock
Song of the Year	The Cormiers – "Miracle of Christmas"
Female Artist of the Year	Mary Barry
Jazz and Blues Award	Mary Barry
Male Artist of the Year	Chris LeDrew
Country Artist of the Year	Chris LeDrew
Gospel Award	David Chafe
Classical Award	David Chafe and Christopher Bowman
Rising Star Award (CBC Galaxie)	Dana Parsons
Pop-Rock Award	Blair Harvey
Instrumental Artist of the Year	Gordon Quinton
Side Musician of the Year	Brian Way
Alternative Group of the Year	The Kremlin
Lifetime Achievement	Dermot O'Reilly (posthumous)

=== 2006 ===
Held November 6, 2006, in Stephenville.

Category	Winner
Album of the Year	Hey Rosetta! – Plan Your Escape
Group of the Year	Hey Rosetta!
Pop/Rock Group of the Year	Hey Rosetta!
CBC Galaxie Rising Star of the Year	Hey Rosetta!
Entertainer of the Year	Ron Hynes
SOCAN Song of the Year	Ron Hynes – "Dry"
Best Folk-Roots Artist	Ron Hynes
Male Artist of the Year	Kevin Collins
Country Artist of the Year	Kevin Collins
Female Artist of the Year	Sherry Ryan
Jazz-Blues Award	Duane Andrews
Alternative Artist of the Year	Mark Bragg
Gospel Award	David Chafe
Instrumental Group of the Year	Celtic Fiddlers
Classical Award	Lloyd Bartlett
Industry Builder	College of the North Atlantic
Side Musician of the Year	Patrick Boyle
