= Three Rock Cove, Newfoundland and Labrador =

Human settlement in Newfoundland, Canada

Coordinates: 48°37′N 59°06′W

Three Rock Cove is a local service district and designated place in the Canadian province of Newfoundland and Labrador. It is northwest of Stephenville.

== History ==
Three Rock Cove was originally known as Trois Cailloux, named for the three large rocks located just off of the shore. Due to erosion two rocks are reduced in size and the last has been reduced to a stub that can only be seen at low tide.

== Geography ==
Three Rock Cove is in Newfoundland within Subdivision E of Division No. 4.

== Demographics ==
As a designated place in the 2016 Census of Population conducted by Statistics Canada, Three Rock Cove recorded a population of 188 living in 88 of its 96 total private dwellings, a change of -0.5% from its 2011 population of 189. With a land area of 10.6 km^{2} (4.1 sq mi), it had a population density of 17.7/km^{2} (45.9/sq mi) in 2016.

== Government ==
Three Rock Cove is a local service district (LSD) that is governed by a committee responsible for the provision of certain services to the community. The chair of the LSD committee is Maureen Dennis.

== Amalgamation and incorporation ==
On March 2, 2026, the Government of Newfoundland and Labrador approved a request by Three Rock Cove and the LSD of Mainland to amalgamate together and incorporate as a new municipality.

== See also ==
- List of communities in Newfoundland and Labrador
- List of designated places in Newfoundland and Labrador
- List of local service districts in Newfoundland and Labrador
