= List of airports in Canada (N–Q) =

This is an list of all Nav Canada certified and registered water and land airports, aerodromes and heliports in the provinces and territories of Canada. The list is sorted alphabetically as shown in the Canada Flight Supplement (and the name as used by the airport if different) and airports names in italics are part of the National Airports System.

They are listed in the format:

- Airport name as listed by either the Canada Flight Supplement (CFS) or the airport authority, alternate name, International Civil Aviation Organization (ICAO) code, Transport Canada Location identifier (TC LID) International Air Transport Association (IATA) code, community and province.

== N ==
Airport name	ICAO	TC LID	IATA	Community	Province or territory
Nahanni Butte Airport		CBD6		Nahanni Butte	Northwest Territories
Náįlįcho Water Aerodrome		CFV5		Nahanni National Park Reserve	Northwest Territories
Nain Airport	CYDP		YDP	Nain	Newfoundland and Labrador
Nairn (Triple Nickel) Aerodrome		CTN8		Nairn	Ontario
Nakina Airport	CYQN		YQN	Nakina	Ontario
Nakina Water Aerodrome		CNE7		Nakina	Ontario
Nakusp Airport		CAQ5		Nakusp	British Columbia
Nakusp (Arrow Lakes Hospital) Heliport		CAL2		Nakusp	British Columbia
Nampa/Hockey Aerodrome		CNP6		Nampa	Alberta
Namur Lake Airport		CFB5		Namur Lake	Alberta
Namushka Lodge Water Aerodrome		CEP9		Namushka Lodge (Harding Lake)	Northwest Territories
Nanaimo Airport	CYCD		YCD	Nanaimo	British Columbia
Nanaimo Boat Harbour Heliport		CMM3		Nanaimo	British Columbia
Nanaimo/Gabriola Island (Health Clinic) Heliport		CGB4		Nanaimo	British Columbia
Nanaimo Harbour Heliport		CDH5		Nanaimo	British Columbia
Nanaimo Harbour Water Aerodrome		CAC8	ZNA	Nanaimo Harbour	British Columbia
Nanaimo/Quennell Lake Water Aerodrome		CBQ9		Quennell Lake	British Columbia
Nanaimo (Regional Hospital) Heliport		CBG5		Nanaimo	British Columbia
Naramata Heliport		CNM6		Naramata	British Columbia
Natashquan Airport	CYNA		YNA	Natashquan	Quebec
Natashquan (Lac de l'Avion) Water Aerodrome		CSY8		Natashquan	Quebec
Natuashish Airport		CNH2		Natuashish	Newfoundland and Labrador
Naujaat Airport	CYUT		YUT	Naujaat	Nunavut
Neepawa Airport		CJV5		Neepawa	Manitoba
Neilburg Airport		CJV2		Neilburg	Saskatchewan
Nejanilini Lake Airport	CYNN			Nejanilini Lake	Manitoba
Nekweaga Bay Airport		CKN8		Nekweaga Bay	Saskatchewan
Nelson Airport	CZNL			Nelson	British Columbia
Nelson/Blaylock Estate Heliport	CYB3			Nelson	British Columbia
Nelson (High Terrain Helicopters) Heliport		CHT4		Nelson	British Columbia
Nelson Water Aerodrome		CAD8		Nelson	British Columbia
Nemiscau Airport	CYHH		YNS	Nemaska	Quebec
Nestor Falls Airport		CJA5		Nestor Falls	Ontario
Nestor Falls/Sabaskong Bay Water Aerodrome		CKW3		Nestor Falls	Ontario
Nestor Falls Water Aerodrome		CKT3		Nestor Falls	Ontario
Neuville Airport (Quebec/Neuville Airport)		CNV9		Neuville	Quebec
Newburgh Aerodrome		CNB6		Newburgh	Ontario
New Denver/Slocan Community (Health Centre) Heliport		CND7		New Denver	British Columbia
New Germany Water Aerodrome		CCA2		New Germany	Nova Scotia
New Glasgow (Aberdeen Hospital) Heliport		CNG2		New Glasgow	Nova Scotia
New Liskeard (Temiskaming Hospital) Heliport		CNV3		New Liskeard	Ontario
Newtonville/Steeves Field Aerodrome		CNT9		Newtonville	Ontario
Niagara Central Dorothy Rungeling Airport (Welland/Niagara Central Dorothy Rungeling Airport)		CNQ3		Welland	Ontario
Niagara Falls (Greater Niagara General Hospital) Heliport		CNG8		Niagara Falls	Ontario
Niagara Falls Heliport		CPQ3		Niagara Falls	Ontario
Nicolet Heliport		CSK9		Nicolet	Quebec
Nimpo Lake Water Aerodrome		CAF8		Nimpo Lake	British Columbia
Nipawin Airport	CYBU		YBU	Nipawin	Saskatchewan
Nipawin Hospital Heliport		CNH3		Nipawin	Saskatchewan
Nipigon (District Memorial Hospital) Heliport		CKE9		Nipigon	Ontario
Nixon Airport		CNX8		Nixon	Ontario
Nobel/Sawdust Bay Water Aerodrome		CNT2		Nobel	Ontario
Nora Lake/Comak Landing Water Landing		CNL7		Dorset	Ontario
Nordegg/Ahlstrom Heliport		CEG6		Nordegg	Alberta
Norland/Shadow Lake (Penny) Water Aerodrome		CNP9		Norland (Shadow Lake)	Ontario
Norland/Shadow Lake (Trotter) Water Aerodrome		CTR5		Norland (Shadow Lake)	Ontario
Norland/Trotter Aerodrome		CNR5		Norland	Ontario
Norman Wells Airport	CYVQ		YVQ	Norman Wells	Northwest Territories
Norman Wells Water Aerodrome		CEU8		Norman Wells	Northwest Territories
North Battleford Airport	CYQW		YQW	North Battleford	Saskatchewan
North Bay/Jack Garland Airport (North Bay Airport)	CYYB		YYB	North Bay	Ontario
North Bay (North Bay Regional Health Centre) Heliport		CNB3		North Bay	Ontario
North Bay Water Aerodrome		CNH7		North Bay	Ontario
North Peace Airport (Fort St. John Airport)	CYXJ		YXJ	Fort St. John	British Columbia
North Seal River Airport		CEG8		North Seal River	Manitoba
North Spirit Lake Airport		CKQ3	YNO	North Spirit Lake First Nation	Ontario
Northwest Regional Airport Terrace-Kitimat (Terrace Airport)	CYXT		YGB	Terrace / Kitimat	British Columbia
Norway House Airport	CYNE		YNE	Norway House	Manitoba
Norway House Water Aerodrome		CKY3		Norway House	Manitoba
Nueltin Lake Airport		CNL9		Nueltin Lake	Manitoba

== O ==
Airport name	ICAO	TC LID	IATA	Community	Province or territory
Oak Hammock Air Park Airport		CAV9		Oak Hammock Marsh	Manitoba
Oakville (Trafalgar Memorial Hospital) Heliport		CTM9		Oakville	Ontario
Oakwood Aerodrome		COK3		Oakwood	Ontario
Obre Lake/North of Sixty Airport		CKV4	YDW	North of Sixty Fishing Camps	Northwest Territories
Obre Lake/North of Sixty Water Aerodrome		CKP8		North of Sixty Fishing Camps	Northwest Territories
Ocean Falls Water Aerodrome		CAH2	ZOF	Ocean Falls	British Columbia
Odessa/Strawberry Lakes Aerodrome		CSL7		Odessa	Saskatchewan
Ogilvie Aerodrome		CFS4		Ogilvie River	Yukon
Ogoki Post Airport	CYKP		YOG	Marten Falls First Nation	Ontario
Oie Lake/Dougall Campbell Field Aerodrome		CDC5		Oie Lake	British Columbia
Old Crow Airport	CYOC		YOC	Old Crow	Yukon
Olds-Didsbury Airport		CEA3		Olds	Alberta
Olds (Hospital) Heliport		CFU9		Olds / Didsbury	Alberta
Olds (Netook) Airport		CFK6		Olds	Alberta
Oliver Municipal Airport		CAU3		Oliver	British Columbia
Omemee Aerodrome		CME2		Omemee	Ontario
100 Mile House Airport		CAV3		100 Mile House	British Columbia
108 Mile Ranch Airport (South Cariboo Regional Airport)	CZML		ZMH	108 Mile Ranch	British Columbia
Opapimiskan Lake Airport		CKM8		Musselwhite mine	Ontario
Orangeville/Castlewood Field Aerodrome		CPV2		Orangeville	Ontario
Orangeville (Headwaters Healthecare Centre) Heliport		CHW2		Orangeville	Ontario
Orangeville/Laurel Aerodrome		COL2		Orangeville	Ontario
Orilla/Pumpkin Bay Water Aerodrome		COP4		Orillia (Lake Couchiching)	Ontario
Orillia/Lake St John (Orillia Rama Regional) Water Aerodrome		CNV6		Orillia	Ontario
Orillia/Matchedash Lake Water Aerodrome		CPU5		Orillia	Ontario
Orillia (Ontario Provincial Police) Heliport		COP2		Orillia	Ontario
Orillia/Port Lehmann Water Aerodrome		CLM9		Orillia (Lake Couchiching)	Ontario
Orillia Rama Regional Airport		CNJ4		Orillia	Ontario
Orono Field Aerodrome		COR3		Orono	Ontario
Orono/Hawkefield Aerodrome		CHF4		Orono	Ontario
Orrville/Martin Lake Water Aerodrome		CMA7		Orrville	Ontario
Oshawa Executive Airport (Toronto/Oshawa Executive Airport)	CYOO		YOO	Oshawa	Ontario
Osoyoos Airport		CBB9		Osoyoos	British Columbia
Ospika Airport		CBA9		Ospika	British Columbia
Ottawa/Casselman (Shea Field) Aerodrome		CSF7		Ottawa	Ontario
Ottawa (Children's Hospital) Heliport		CPK7		Ottawa	Ontario
Ottawa (Civic Hospital) Heliport		CPP7		Ottawa	Ontario
Ottawa/Dwyer Hill Heliport	CYDH			Ottawa	Ontario
Ottawa/Embrun Aerodrome		CPR2		Embrun	Ontario
Ottawa/Gatineau Airport (Gatineau-Ottawa Executive Airport)	CYND		YND	Gatineau	Quebec
Ottawa/Gatineau (Casino) Heliport		CTA9		Gatineau	Quebec
Ottawa Macdonald–Cartier International Airport (Macdonald-Cartier International Airport)	CYOW		YOW	Ottawa	Ontario
Ottawa/Rockcliffe Airport (Rockcliffe Airport)	CYRO		YRO	Ottawa	Ontario
Ottawa/Rockcliffe Water Aerodrome		CTR7		Ottawa	Ontario
Ottawa (Winchester District Memorial Hospital) Heliport		CWH4		Winchester	Ontario
Otter Lake Water Aerodrome		CKB4		Otter Lake	Saskatchewan
Outlook (South) Aerodrome		CCL9		Outlook	Saskatchewan
Owen Sound (Brightshores Health System) Heliport		CNK6		Owen Sound	Ontario
Owen Sound (Cook Field) Aerodrome		CCK5		Owen Sound	Ontario
Oxbow Airport		CJW2		Oxbow	Saskatchewan
Oxford House Airport	CYOH		YOH	Oxford House	Manitoba
Oyen Municipal Airport		CED3		Oyen	Alberta

== P ==
Airport name	ICAO	TC LID	IATA	Community	Province or territory
Paddy Lake Water Aerodrome		CPL8		Burwash	Ontario
Palmerston (District Hospital) Heliport		CPA3		Palmerston	Ontario
Pangman Airport		CKC9		Pangman	Saskatchewan
Pangnirtung Airport	CYXP		YXP	Pangnirtung	Nunavut
Parc Gatineau Water Aerodrome		CSD9		Lac-des-Loups	Quebec
Parent Airport	CYPP			Parent	Quebec
Parkhill (Yellow Gold) Aerodrome		CYG2		Parkhill	Ontario
Parksville (Ascent Helicopters) Heliport		CAH5		Parksville	British Columbia
Parrry Sound/Revilo Island Water Aerodrome		CRV7		Parry Sound (Georgian Bay)	Ontario
Parry Sound Area Municipal Airport		CNK4	YPD	Parry Sound	Ontario
Parry Sound (B183 Island) Water Aerodrome		CPS7		Parry Sound (Georgian Bay)	Ontario
Parry Sound/Deep Bay Water Aerodrome		CPT8		Parry Sound	Ontario
Parry Sound/Frying Pan Island-Sans Souci Water Aerodrome		CPS9		Parry Sound (Georgian Bay)	Ontario
Parry Sound Harbour Water Aerodrome		CPS1		Parry Sound (Georgian Bay)	Ontario
Parry Sound/Huron Island Water Aerodrome		CPS8		Parry Sound (Georgian Bay)	Ontario
Parry Sound Medical Heliport		CRS2		Parry Sound	Ontario
Parry Sound (Portage Lake) Water Aerodrome		CPS3		Parry Sound	Ontario
Parry Sound (Roberts Lake) Water Aerodrome		CRL8		Parry Sound	Ontario
Parry Sound/Salmon Lake Water Aerodrome		CSJ9		Parry Sound	Ontario
Parry Sound/St. Waleran Island Water Aerodrome		CPD6		Parry Sound (Georgian Bay)	Ontario
Patuanak Airport		CKB2		Patuanak	Saskatchewan
Paudash Lake (Marina) Water Aerodrome		CPD5		Paudash (Paudash Lake)	Ontario
Paudash Lake (Murray's Landing) Water Aerodrome		CWP4		Paudash (Paudash Lake)	Ontario
Paulatuk (Nora Aliqatchialuk Ruben) Airport	CYPC		YPC	Paulatuk	Northwest Territories
Paulatuk Water Aerodrome		CEW8		Paulatuk	Northwest Territories
Peace River Airport	CYPE		YPE	Peace River	Alberta
Peawanuck Airport	CYPO		YPO	Peawanuck	Ontario
Pelee Island Airport	CYPT			Pelee	Ontario
Pelican Airport		CFT8		Wabasca oil field	Alberta
Pelican Narrows Airport		CJW4		Pelican Narrows	Saskatchewan
Pelican Narrows Water Aerodrome		CKE4		Pelican Narrows	Saskatchewan
Pelly Crossing Airport		CFQ6		Pelly Crossing	Yukon
Pemberton Regional Airport	CYPS			Pemberton	British Columbia
Pembroke Airport	CYTA		YTA	Pembroke	Ontario
Pembroke (Regional Hospital) Heliport		CNG5		Pembroke	Ontario
Pender Harbour Water Aerodrome		CAG8	YPT	Pender Harbour	British Columbia
Pendleton Airport		CNF3		Pendleton	Ontario
Penticton Regional Airport	CYYF		YYF	Penticton	British Columbia
Penticton Regional Hospital Heliport		CPH6		Penticton	British Columbia
Perth (Great War Memorial Hospital) Heliport		CNC9		Perth	Ontario
Petawawa \ Vermette Landing Water Aerodrome		CVL4		Petawawa, Ontario (Ottawa River)	Quebec
Petawawa Heliport	CYWA		YWA	Petawawa	Ontario
Peterborough Regional Airport	CYPQ		YPQ	Peterborough	Ontario
Peterborough (Regional Health Centre) Heliport		CNU3		Peterborough	Ontario
Petrolia/Butler Airfield		CBA7		Petrolia	Ontario
Pickle Lake Airport	CYPL		YPL	Pickle Lake	Ontario
Pickle Lake Water Aerodrome		CKG4		Pickle Lake	Ontario
Picton (Greenbush) Aerodrome		CGB3		Picton	Ontario
Pierceland (Turchyn Field) Aerodrome		CTF5		Pierceland	Saskatchewan
Pikangikum Airport	CYPM		YPM	Pikangikum First Nation	Ontario
Pikwitonei Airport	CZMN		PIW	Pikwitonei	Manitoba
Pilot Butte Airport		CPB5		Pilot Butte	Saskatchewan
Pincher Creek Airport	CZPC			Pincher Creek	Alberta
Pincher Creek (Hospital) Heliport		CPR8		Pincher Creek	Alberta
Pine Dock Water Aerodrome		CKT8		Pine Dock	Manitoba
Pinehouse Lake Airport	CZPO			Pinehouse	Saskatchewan
Pine Lake Aerodrome		CFY5		Pine Lake	Yukon
Pintendre Aerodrome		CPT9		Pintendre	Quebec
Pitt Meadows Regional Airport	CYPK		YPK	Pitt Meadows	British Columbia
Pitt Meadows Water Aerodrome		CAJ8		Pitt Meadows	British Columbia
Plattsville (Edward's Air Base) Aerodrome		CLB2		Plattsville	Ontario
Plevna/Tomvale Airport		CNA9		Plevna	Ontario
Pointe au Baril Station Water Aerodrome		CPB6		Pointe au Baril	Ontario
Points North Landing Airport	CYNL		YNL	Points North Landing	Saskatchewan
Points North Landing Water Aerodrome		CKC2		Points North Landing	Saskatchewan
Pokemouche Airport		CDA4		Pokemouche	New Brunswick
Pond Inlet Airport	CYIO		YIO	Pond Inlet	Nunavut
Ponoka (Hospital & Care Centre) Heliport		CHC4		Ponoka	Alberta
Ponoka (Labrie Field) Airport		CEH3		Ponoka	Alberta
Poplar Hill Airport		CPV7	YHP	Poplar Hill First Nation	Ontario
Poplar River Airport	CZNG		XPP	Poplar River First Nation	Manitoba
Porcupine Plain Airport		CKD2		Porcupine Plain	Saskatchewan
Portage (District General Hospital) Heliport		CPO2		Portage la Prairie	Manitoba
Portage Lake Water Aerodrome		CND9		Port Loring (Portage Lake)	Ontario
Portage la Prairie (North) Airport		CJZ2		Portage la Prairie	Manitoba
Portage la Prairie/Southport Airport	CYPG		YPG	Portage la Prairie	Manitoba
Port Alberni (Alberni Valley Regional) Airport		CBS8	YPB	Port Alberni	British Columbia
Port Alberni/Sproat Lake Landing Water Aerodrome		CSP4		Port Alberni (Sproat Lake)	British Columbia
Port Alberni/Sproat Lake Tanker Base Heliport		CBT9		Port Alberni	British Columbia
Port Alberni/Sproat Lake Water Aerodrome		CAA9		Port Alberni (Sproat Lake)	British Columbia
Port Alberni Water Aerodrome		CPW9		Port Alberni	British Columbia
Port Alberni (West Coast General Hospital) Heliport		CBK5		Port Alberni	British Columbia
Port Alice (Hospital) Heliport		CBB5		Port Alice	British Columbia
Port au Choix Airport		CCM4		Port au Choix	Newfoundland and Labrador
Port Carling Aerodrome		CPC2		Port Carling	Ontario
Port Carling (Avon Bay) Water Aerodrome		CPC5		Port Carling	Ontario
Port Carling/Butterfly Lake Water Aerodrome		CPY8		Port Carling	Ontario
Port Carling/Elarton Point Heliport		CPE3		Port Carling	Ontario
Port Carling/Fig Air Heliport		CFA2		Port Carling	Ontario
Port Carling/Horseshoe Island Heliport		CHS8		Port Carling	Ontario
Port Carling/Lake Joseph Water Aerodrome		CLJ2		Port Carling (Lake Joseph)	Ontario
Port Carling/W Shores Heliport		CPC8		Port Carling	Ontario
Port Colborne Airport		CPE5		Port Colborne	Ontario
Port Elgin Airport		CNL4		Port Elgin	Ontario
Porters Lake Airport		CCF4		Porters Lake	Nova Scotia
Porters Lake South Water Aerodrome		CLS4		Porters Lake	Nova Scotia
Porters Lake Water Aerodrome		CDD2		Porters Lake	Nova Scotia
Port Hardy Airport	CYZT		YZT	Port Hardy	British Columbia
Port Hardy (Hospital) Heliport		CBS5		Port Hardy	British Columbia
Port Hardy Water Aerodrome		CAW5		Port Hardy	British Columbia
Port Hawkesbury Airport (Allan J. MacEachen Port Hawkesbury Airport)	CYPD		YPS	Port Hawkesbury	Nova Scotia
Port Hope (Millson Field) Aerodrome		CMF4		Port Hope	Ontario
Port Hope (Peter's Field) Aerodrome		CPH3		Port Hope	Ontario
Port Hope Simpson Airport		CCP4	YHA	Port Hope Simpson	Newfoundland and Labrador
Port Loring Water Aerodrome		CNQ7		Port Loring	Ontario
Port McNeill Airport		CAT5	YMP	Port McNeill	British Columbia
Port McNeill (Hospital) Heliport		CBM9		Port McNeill	British Columbia
Port McNeill Water Aerodrome		CAM8		Port McNeill	British Columbia
Port-Menier Airport	CYPN		YPN	Port-Menier	Quebec
Port-Menier (H. Stever) Heliport		CPM2		Port-Menier	Quebec
Port Perry/Hoskin Aerodrome		CPP3		Port Perry	Ontario
Port Perry (Lakeridge Health) Heliport		CPX6		Port Perry	Ontario
Port Perry/Utica Field Aerodrome		CUT2		Port Perry	Ontario
Port Renfrew (Mill Bay Marine Group) Heliport		CMB9		Port Renfrew	British Columbia
Port Severn/Oak Bay Water Aerodrome		COB2		Port Severn	Ontario
Port Stanton/Sparrow Lake Water Aerodrome		CNX7		Port Stanton	Ontario
Poste Lemoyne (Complex LG-3) Heliport		CSY6		Poste Lemoyne	Quebec
Poste Montagnais Airport (Poste Montagnais		CSF3		Poste Montagnais	Quebec
Postville Airport		CCD4	YSO	Postville	Newfoundland and Labrador
Pourvoirie Mirage Aerodrome		CPM3		Mirage Lodge, Trans-Taiga Road	Quebec
Poverty Valley Aerodrome		CPV9		Poverty Valley	Saskatchewan
Powell Lake Water Aerodrome		CAQ8	WPL	Powell Lake	British Columbia
Powell River Airport	CYPW		YPW	Powell River	British Columbia
Powell River (Qathet General Hospital) Heliport		CPW8		Powell River	British Columbia
Prairie Creek Airport		CBH4		Prairie Creek	Northwest Territories
Preeceville Airport		CJK9		Preeceville	Saskatchewan
Primrose Aerodrome		CFN6		Primrose	Alberta
Prince Albert (Fire Centre) Heliport		CAL6		Prince Albert	Saskatchewan
Prince Albert (Glass Field) Airport	CYPA		YPA	Prince Albert	Saskatchewan
Prince Albert (Victoria Hospital) Heliport		CPV3		Prince Albert	Saskatchewan
Prince George Airport	CYXS		YXS	Prince George	British Columbia
Prince Rupert Airport	CYPR		YPR	Prince Rupert	British Columbia
Prince Rupert/Digby Island Water Aerodrome		CAN6		Prince Rupert	British Columbia
Prince Rupert (Hospital) Heliport		CBR8		Prince Rupert	British Columbia
Prince Rupert/Seal Cove (Coast Guard) Heliport		CBY5		Prince Rupert	British Columbia
Prince Rupert/Seal Cove (Public) Heliport		CBF6		Prince Rupert	British Columbia
Prince Rupert/Seal Cove Water Aerodrome	CZSW		ZSW	Prince Rupert	British Columbia
Princeton Aerodrome	CYDC			Princeton	British Columbia
Provost Airport		CEH6		Provost	Alberta
Pukatawagan Airport	CZFG		XPK	Mathias Colomb First Nation	Manitoba
Puntzi Mountain Airport	CYPU		YPU	Puntzi Mountain	British Columbia
Puvirnituq Airport	CYPX			Puvirnituq	Quebec

== Q ==
Airport name	ICAO	TC LID	IATA	Community	Province or territory
Qikiqtarjuaq Airport	CYVM		YVM	Qikiqtarjuaq	Nunavut
Qualicum Beach (Aerosmith Heli Service) Heliport		CAS5		Qualicum Beach	British Columbia
Qualicum Beach Airport		CAT4	XQU	Qualicum Beach	British Columbia
Quamichan Lake (Raven Field) Airport		CML2		Quamichan Lake	British Columbia
Quamichan Lake (Raven Field) Water Aerodrome		CRF6		Quamichan Lake	British Columbia
Quaqtaq Airport	CYHA		YQC	Quaqtaq	Quebec
Quebec/Capitale Hélicoptère Heliport		CCH7		Quebec City	Quebec
Québec City Jean Lesage International Airport	CYQB		YQB	Quebec City	Quebec
Québec/Lac Saint-Augustin Water Airport		CSN8		Quebec City	Quebec
Quebec/Neuville Airport (Neuville Airport)		CNV9		Neuville	Quebec
Queen Charlotte City Water Aerodrome		CAQ6		Daajing Giids	British Columbia
Quesnel Airport	CYQZ		YQZ	Quesnel	British Columbia
Quesnel Lake Airport		CBK6		Quesnel Lake	British Columbia
Quill Lake Airport		CKE2		Quill Lake	Saskatchewan
