= List of Canadian airports by location indicator: CC =

This is a list of all Nav Canada certified and registered water and land airports, aerodromes and heliports in the Provinces and territories of Canada sorted by location identifier.

They are listed in the format:

- Location indicator – IATA – Airport name (alternate name) – Airport location

== CC – Canada – CAN ==
Also see airport category and list.

TC LID	IATA	Airport name	Community	Province or territory
CCA2		New Germany Water Aerodrome	New Germany	Nova Scotia
CCA3		Cable Head Airpark	Cable Head	Prince Edward Island
CCA4		Lake Muskoka/Cottage Air Water Aerodrome	Bracebridge (Lake Muskoka)	Ontario
CCA5		Stenen/Clayton Air 3 Aerodrome	Stenen	Saskatchewan
CCB2		Seabee Mine Aerodrome	Seabee Gold Mine	Saskatchewan
CCB5		Goose (Otter Creek) Water Aerodrome	Happy Valley-Goose Bay	Newfoundland and Labrador
CCB7		Cumberland Bay Water Aerodrome	Cumberland Bay	New Brunswick
CCB8		Kilbride (Bot) Heliport	Kilbride	Ontario
CCB9		Lake Muskoka/Spirit Bay Water Aerodrome	Bracebridge (Lake Muskoka)	Ontario
CCC2		Winterland Airport	Winterland	Newfoundland and Labrador
CCC3		Cooks Creek Aerodrome	Cooks Creek	Manitoba
CCD2		Springdale Aerodrome	Springdale	Newfoundland and Labrador
CCD3		Woodstock Aerodrome	Woodstock	New Brunswick
CCD4	YSO	Postville Airport	Postville	Newfoundland and Labrador
CCE3		Juniper Airport	Juniper	New Brunswick
CCE4	YBI	Black Tickle Airport	Black Tickle	Newfoundland and Labrador
CCE5		Canso (Eastern Memorial Hospital) Heliport	Canso	Nova Scotia
CCE6		Camden East Aerodrome	Camden East	Ontario
CCE7		Edmonton (City) Heliport	Edmonton	Alberta
CCF4		Porters Lake Airport	Porters Lake	Nova Scotia
CCF6		Edmonton/Morinville (Currie Field) Aerodrome	Edmonton	Alberta
CCF7		Alida/Cowan Farm Private Aerodrome	Alida	Saskatchewan
CCF9		Scottsfield Airpark	Fredericton	New Brunswick
CCG3		Weyman Airpark	Keswick River	New Brunswick
CCG4		Moncton/McEwen Aerodrome	Moncton	New Brunswick
CCG5		Cayuga (Bruce Field) Aerodrome	Cayuga	Ontario
CCG6		St. Peter's/Cape George Water Aerodrome	St. Peter's	Nova Scotia
CCH2		Upper Kent Aerodrome	Upper Kent	New Brunswick
CCH3		Canmore (Hospital) Heliport	Camrose	Alberta
CCH4	YHG	Charlottetown Airport	Charlottetown	Newfoundland and Labrador
CCH6		Summerside (Prince County Hospital) Heliport	Summerside	Prince Edward Island
CCH7		Quebec/Capitale Hélicoptère Heliport	Quebec City	Quebec
CCH9		Cold Lake Healthcare Centre Heliport	Cold Lake	Alberta
CCI9	YCF	Cortes Island Aerodrome	Cortes Island	British Columbia
CCJ3		Boston Brook Airport	Boston Brook	New Brunswick
CCK2		St. John's (Health Sciences Centre) Heliport	St. John's	Newfoundland and Labrador
CCK3		Grand Falls Airport	Grand Falls	New Brunswick
CCK4		St. Lewis (Fox Harbour) Airport	St. Lewis	Newfoundland and Labrador
CCK5		Owen Sound (Cook Field) Aerodrome	Owen Sound	Ontario
CCL2		Candle Lake Airpark	Candle Lake	Saskatchewan
CCL3		Christina Lake Aerodrome	Christina Lake	Alberta
CCL5		Chandos Lake/Sciuk's Landing Water Aerodrome	Apsley (Chandos Lake)	Ontario
CCL6		Chilko Lake (Wilderness Lodge) Aerorome	Chilko Lake	British Columbia
CCL7		Walsingham/Ceilidh Aerodrome	Walshingham	Ontario
CCL9		Outlook (South) Aerodrome	Outlook	Saskatchewan
CCM2		Earlton/McLean Heliport	Earlton	Ontario
CCM3		Sevogle Airport	Big Sevogle River	New Brunswick
CCM4		Port au Choix Airport	Port au Choix	Newfoundland and Labrador
CCN2		Grand Manan Airport	Grand Manan	New Brunswick
CCN4		Conn Aerodrome	Conn	Ontario
CCP2		Exploits Valley (Botwood) Airport	Botwood	Newfoundland and Labrador
CCP3		Chute-Saint-Philippe Aerodrome	Chute-Saint-Philippe	Quebec
CCP4	YHA	Port Hope Simpson Airport	Port Hope Simpson	Newfoundland and Labrador
CCP5		Rawdon/Camping Pontbriand (Hydro) Water Aerodrome	Rawdon	Quebec
CCP7		Eaglesham/Codesa South Aerodrome	Eaglesham	Alberta
CCQ3		Debert Airport (CFS Debert)	Debert	Nova Scotia
CCQ5		St. John's (Paddys Pond) Water Aerodrome	St. John's	Newfoundland and Labrador
CCR3		Florenceville Airport	Florenceville-Bristol	New Brunswick
CCR5		Cline River Heliport	Cline River	Alberta
CCR6		Campbell River (Graham Air Limited) Heliport	Campbell River	British Columbia
CCR8		Conne River Water Aerodrome	Miawpukek First Nation	Newfoundland and Labrador
CCR9		Creemore Aerodrome	Creemore	Ontario
CCS2		Consort (Health Centre) Heliport	Consort	Alberta
CCS3		St. Stephen Airport	St. Stephen	New Brunswick
CCS4		Chipman Airport	Chipman	New Brunswick
CCS5		Havelock Airport	Havelock	New Brunswick
CCS6		Courtenay (Smit Field) Airport	Courtenay	British Columbia
CCS7		Chicoutimi (C. H. de Chicoutimi) Heliport	Chicoutimi	Quebec
CCT2		Cookstown Airport	Cookstown	Ontario
CCT3		Castlegar (Tarrys Convention Centre) Heliport	Castlegar	British Columbia
CCT5		South Brook Water Aerodrome	South Brook	Newfoundland and Labrador
CCU2		Saint-Cuthbert (Ulm Québec) Aerodrome	Saint-Cuthbert	Quebec
CCV4		Bell Island Airport	Bell Island	Newfoundland and Labrador
CCW2		Collingwood (Wilsons) Heliport	Collingwood	Ontario
CCW4		Stanley Airport	Stanley	Nova Scotia
CCW5		Thorburn Lake Water Aerodrome	Thorburn Lake	Newfoundland and Labrador
CCW6		Washago/Clearwater Lake Water Aerodrome	Washago	Ontario
CCX2		Long Pond Heliport	Foxtrap	Newfoundland and Labrador
CCX3		Brockway Airport	Brockway	New Brunswick
CCX5		Wabush Water Aerodrome	Wabush	Newfoundland and Labrador
CCX6		Comox Water Aerodrome	Comox	British Columbia
CCY2		Swift Current (Cypress Regional Hospital) Heliport	Swift Current	Saskatchewan
CCY3		Sussex Aerodrome	Sussex	New Brunswick
CCY4		East Gore Eco Airpark	East Gore	Nova Scotia
CCZ2	YRG	Rigolet Airport	Rigolet	Newfoundland and Labrador
CCZ3		Clarenville Airport	Clarenville	Newfoundland and Labrador
CCZ5		Thorburn Airport	Thorburn	Nova Scotia
CCZ9		Shelburne (Roseway Hospital) Heliport	Shelburne	Nova Scotia

== CD – Canada – CAN ==
Also see airport category and list.

TC LID	IATA	Airport name	Community	Province or territory
CDA4		Pokemouche Airport	Pokemouche	New Brunswick
CDA5		St. Andrews (Codroy Valley) Airport	St. Andrew's	Newfoundland and Labrador
CDA6		Bristol Aerodrome	Florenceville-Bristol	New Brunswick
CDA7		Shunda (Fire Base) Heliport	Shunda	Alberta
CDA8		Kirkfield/Balsam Lake (Dutto) Water Aerodrome	Kirkfield (Balsam Lake)	Ontario
CDB2		DeBolt Fire Hall Heliport	DeBolt	Alberta
CDB3		Delburne/Hall Residence Heliport	Delburne	Alberta
CDB5		Moncton/Sailsbury Heliport	Moncton	New Brunswick
CDC2		St. John's (Quinlan Heliflight Services) Heliport	St. John's	Newfoundland and Labrador
CDC3		Dawson Creek (Flying L Ranch) Airport	Dawson Creek	British Columbia
CDC5		Oie Lake/Dougall Campbell Field Aerodrome	Oie Lake	British Columbia
CDD2		Porters Lake Water Aerodrome	Porters Lake	Nova Scotia
CDD7		Didsbury District Health Services Heliport	Didsbury	Alberta
CDE2		Lac-des-Écorces/Heliport Belle-Île	Lac-des-Écorces	Quebec
CDF2		Teeswater (Dent Field) Aerodrome	Teeswater	Ontario
CDF3		Englehart (Dave's Field) Aerodrome	Englehart	Ontario
CDF5		Elora Aerodrome	Elora	Ontario
CDF6		Arthur (Damascus Field) Aerodrome	Arthur	Ontario
CDF7		Millgrove/Dragon’s Fire Heliport	Millgrove	Ontario
CDG2		Digby (General Hospital) Heliport	Digby	Nova Scotia
CDG3		Dungannon Aerodrome	Dungannon	Ontario
CDH2		Drumheller (Health Centre) Heliport	Drumheller	Alberta
CDH3		Finlay Air Park	Finlay	Nova Scotia
CDH4		Duncan (Cowichan District Hospital) Heliport	Duncan	British Columbia
CDH5		Nanaimo Harbour Heliport	Nanaimo	British Columbia
CDH6		Delhi Aerodrome	Delhi	Ontario
CDJ4		Clearwater Aerodrome	Clearwater	New Brunswick
CDJ5		Strathmore (D.J. Murray) Airport	Strathmore	Alberta
CDJ8		Dunrobin/Django Field Aerodrome	Dunrobin	Ontario
CDK2		Diavik Airport	Diavik Diamond Mine	Northwest Territories
CDK3		Dorset/Kawagama Lake (South) Water Aerodrome	Dorset	Ontario
CDL3		Daysland Health Centre Heliport	Daysland	Alberta
CDL5		Doctor's Lake East Water Aerodrome	Yarmouth	Nova Scotia
CDL6		Doctor's Lake West Water Aerodrome	Yarmouth	Nova Scotia
CDL8		Centredale Aerodrome	Centredale	Nova Scotia
CDM2		Didsbury/Minty Field Aerodrome	Didsbury	Alberta
CDM3		Kirkfield/Dimkovski Airpark	Kirkfield	Ontario
CDM4		Mono/Dunby Manor Heliport	Mono	Ontario
CDN2		Danville Aerodrome	Danville	Quebec
CDP2		Ear Falls Aerodrome	Ear Falls	Ontario
CDP3		Utik Lake/Dennis G Punches Field Aerodrome	Utik Lake	Manitoba
CDR2		Dalrymple Lake/Powers Water Aerodrome	Kirkfield	Ontario
CDS2		Disley Aerodrome	Lumsden	Saskatchewan
CDS5		Dunsford Seaplane Base Water Aerodrome	Dunsford	Ontario
CDT2		Hoopers Lake Water Aerodrome	Hoopers Lake	Nova Scotia
CDT3		Arichat (St. Anne Ladies Auxiliary Hospital) Heliport	Arichat	Nova Scotia
CDT5		Bouctouche Aerodrome	Grand-Bouctouche	New Brunswick
CDT6		Bridgewater (South Shore Regional Hospital) Heliport	Bridgewater	Nova Scotia
CDT8		Eaglesham/Delta Tango Field Aerodrome	Eaglesham	Alberta
CDT9		Detour Lake Aerodrome	Detour Lake Mine	Ontario
CDU2		Dundas Heliport	Dundas	Ontario
CDU3		Yarmouth (Regional Hospital) Heliport	Yarmouth	Nova Scotia
CDU4		Springdale/Davis Pond Water Aerodrome	Springdale	Newfoundland and Labrador
CDU5		Dunsford Aerodrome	Dunsford	Ontario
CDU6		Doaktown Airport	Doaktown	New Brunswick
CDU7		Brechin/Ronan Aircraft Aerodrome (Note: Includes a 2,000 ft (610 m) long water runway.)	Brechin	Ontario
CDU8		Dunsford Heliport	Dunsford	Ontario
CDU9		Lake Doucette Water Aerodrome	Lake Doucette	Nova Scotia
CDV2		Downs Gulch Aerodrome	Downs Gulch	New Brunswick
CDV3		Charlottetown (Queen Elizabeth Hospital) Heliport	Charlottetown	Prince Edward Island
CDW2		Baddeck (Guneden) Aerodrome	Baddeck	Nova Scotia
CDW3		De Winton (Hamlet) Heliport	De Winton	Alberta
CDY3		Fogo Aerodrome	Fogo	Newfoundland and Labrador
CDY5		Antigonish (St. Martha's Regional Hospital) Heliport	Antigonish	Nova Scotia
CDY6		Bridgewater/Dayspring Airpark	Bridgewater	Nova Scotia
