= List of airports in Newfoundland and Labrador =

Newfoundland and Labrador

This is a list of airports in Newfoundland and Labrador. It includes all Nav Canada certified and registered water and land airports, aerodromes and heliports in the Canadian province of Newfoundland and Labrador. Airport names in italics are part of the National Airports System.

== List of airports and heliports ==
Gander and St. John's are classified as international airports by Transport Canada.

The list is sorted by the name of the community served; click the sort buttons in the table header to switch listing order.

Community	Airport name	PU PR MI	AOE (Note: An airport of entry has four different categories. An AOE which can accept "all classes of scheduled and non-scheduled aircraft (passenger and cargo)." An AOE/# which can handle aircraft in the previous category but up to maximum number. This number can be exceeded if done in stages as shown in parentheses. An AOE/15 that can accept general aviation aircraft with a maximum of 15 passengers. An AOE/CAN which can handle aircraft subject to the CANPASS regulations.)	Operator	Elevation	ICAO	TC LID	IATA	Image	Coordinates
Bell Island	Bell Island Airport	PU		Govt of Newfoundland and Labrador	191 ft (58 m)		CCV4			47°38′06″N 52°58′48″W
Black Tickle	Black Tickle Airport	PU		Govt of Newfoundland and Labrador	52 ft (16 m)		CCE4	YBI		53°28′12″N 55°47′15″W
Botwood	Exploits Valley (Botwood) Airport	PU		Govt of Newfoundland and Labrador	319 ft (97 m)		CCP2			49°03′22″N 55°26′52″W
Cartwright	Cartwright Airport	PU		Govt of Newfoundland and Labrador	42 ft (13 m)	CYCA		YRF		53°40′58″N 57°02′31″W
Cartwright (Eagle River)	Eagle River/Rifflin' Hitch Water Aerodrome	PR		Rifflin' Hitch Lodge	151 ft (46 m)		CRH3			53°25′14″N 57°41′39″W
Charlottetown	Charlottetown Airport	PU		Govt of Newfoundland and Labrador	210 ft (64 m)		CCH4	YHG		52°45′54″N 56°06′56″W
Churchill Falls	Churchill Falls Airport	PU		Churchill Falls (Labrador) Corp	1,437 ft (438 m)	CZUM		ZUM		53°33′43″N 64°06′23″W
Clarenville	Clarenville Airport	PU		Govt of Newfoundland and Labrador	196 ft (60 m)		CCZ3			48°16′29″N 53°55′26″W
Deer Lake	Deer Lake Regional Airport	PU	120 (250)	Deer Lake Regional Airport Authority	72 ft (22 m)	CYDF		YDF		49°12′40″N 57°23′29″W
Fogo	Fogo Aerodrome	PU		Govt of Newfoundland and Labrador	97 ft (30 m)		CDY3			49°39′27″N 54°14′15″W
Foxtrap	Long Pond Heliport	PR		Cougar Helicopters	42 ft (13 m)		CCX2			47°30′59″N 52°58′52″W
Gander	Gander International Airport	PU	AOE	Gander International Airport Authority	496 ft (151 m)	CYQX		YQX		48°56′13″N 54°34′05″W
Gander	Gander (James Paton Memorial Regional Health Centre) Heliport	PR		James Paton Memorial Regional Health Centre	432 ft (132 m)		CGH2			48°57′19″N 54°37′38″W
Grand Falls-Windsor	Grand Falls-Windsor Heliport	PU		Town of Grand Falls-Windsor	157 ft (48 m)		CFW8			48°55′29″N 55°38′50″W
Happy Valley-Goose Bay	CFB Goose Bay	MI	15 (Note: AOE/M for military aircraft in addition to general aviation)	5 Wing Ops Centre (military); Goose Bay Airport Corporation (civilian)	160 ft (49 m)	CYYR		YYR		53°19′09″N 60°25′33″W
Happy Valley-Goose Bay	Goose (Otter Creek) Water Aerodrome	PU	15 (Note: Seaplanes only.)	Goose Bay Airport Corporation	0 ft (0 m)		CCB5			53°21′00″N 60°25′00″W
Harbour Grace	Harbour Grace Airport	PU		Town of Harbour Grace	325 ft (99 m)		CHG2			47°41′08″N 53°15′14″W
Hopedale	Hopedale Airport	PU		Govt of Newfoundland and Labrador	46 ft (14 m)	CYHO		YHO		55°26′54″N 60°13′43″W
Long Harbour River	Long Harbour River Heliport	PR		Canadian Northern Outfitters	300 ft (91 m)		CLH7			47°54′16″N 54°55′13″W
Makkovik	Makkovik Airport	PU		Govt of Newfoundland and Labrador	231 ft (70 m)	CYFT		YMN		55°04′38″N 59°11′15″W
Mary's Harbour	Mary's Harbour Airport	PU		Govt of Newfoundland and Labrador	35 ft (11 m)	CYMH		YMH		52°18′10″N 55°50′52″W
Miawpukek First Nation	Conne River Water Aerodrome	PU		Micmac Air Services	350 ft (110 m)		CCR8			47°55′30″N 55°34′40″W
Nain	Nain Airport	PU		Govt of Newfoundland and Labrador	21 ft (6.4 m)	CYDP		YDP		56°33′02″N 61°40′56″W
Natuashish	Natuashish Airport	PU		Govt of Newfoundland and Labrador	33 ft (10 m)		CNH2			55°54′50″N 61°11′04″W
Port au Choix	Port au Choix Airport	PU		Govt of Newfoundland and Labrador	90 ft (27 m)		CCM4			50°41′20″N 57°19′53″W
Port Hope Simpson	Port Hope Simpson Airport	PU		Govt of Newfoundland and Labrador	339 ft (103 m)		CCP4	YHA		52°31′41″N 56°17′10″W
Postville	Postville Airport	PU		Govt of Newfoundland and Labrador	223 ft (68 m)		CCD4	YSO		54°54′37″N 59°47′07″W
Rigolet	Rigolet Airport	PU		Govt of Newfoundland and Labrador	186 ft (57 m)		CCZ2	YRG		54°10′47″N 58°27′27″W
St. Andrew's	St. Andrews (Codroy Valley) Airport	PU		Govt of Newfoundland and Labrador	90 ft (27 m)		CDA5			47°46′33″N 59°18′45″W
St. Anthony	St. Anthony Airport	PU		Transport Canada	108 ft (33 m)	CYAY		YAY		51°23′31″N 56°04′59″W
St. John's	St. John's International Airport	PU	165 (450)	St. John's International Airport Authority Inc	461 ft (141 m)	CYYT		YYT		47°37′07″N 52°45′09″W
St. John's	St. John's (Health Sciences Centre) Heliport	PR		Eastern Health Care	216 ft (66 m)		CCK2			47°34′21″N 52°44′44″W
St. John's	St. John's (Paddys Pond) Water Aerodrome	PU		Avalon Float Plane Association	375 ft (114 m)		CCQ5			47°28′00″N 52°54′00″W
St. John's	St. John's (Quinlan Heliflight Services) Heliport	PR		Quinlan Heliflight Services	412 ft (126 m)		CDC2			47°36′30″N 52°43′37″W
St. Lewis	St. Lewis (Fox Harbour) Airport	PU		Govt of Newfoundland and Labrador	74 ft (23 m)		CCK4			52°22′22″N 55°40′26″W
South Brook	South Brook Water Aerodrome	PR		Air Sport Inc.	17 ft (5.2 m)		CCT5			49°01′00″N 57°38′00″W
Springdale	Springdale Aerodrome	PU		Govt of Newfoundland and Labrador	250 ft (76 m)		CCD2			49°28′44″N 56°10′41″W
Springdale	Springdale/Davis Pond Water Aerodrome	PR		Springdale Aviation Ltd.	80 ft (24 m)		CDU4			49°33′00″N 56°03′00″W
Stephenville	Stephenville International Airport	PU	30	Stephenville Dymond Airport	81 ft (25 m)	CYJT		YJT		48°32′29″N 58°33′00″W
Thorburn Lake	Thorburn Lake Water Aerodrome	PR		Clarenville Aviation; Thorburn Aviation	350 ft (110 m)		CCW5			48°16′00″N 54°09′00″W
Voisey's Bay Mine	Voisey's Bay Aerodrome	PR		Vale Inco	246 ft (75 m)		CVB2			56°20′41″N 62°05′17″W
Wabush	Wabush Airport	PU		Transport Canada	1,809 ft (551 m)	CYWK		YWK		52°55′22″N 66°51′53″W
Wabush	Wabush Water Aerodrome	PR		Air Tunilik	1,700 ft (520 m)		CCX5			52°56′00″N 66°54′00″W
Winterland	Winterland Airport	PU	15	Govt of Newfoundland and Labrador	156 ft (48 m)		CCC2			47°08′13″N 55°19′45″W

== Defunct airports ==
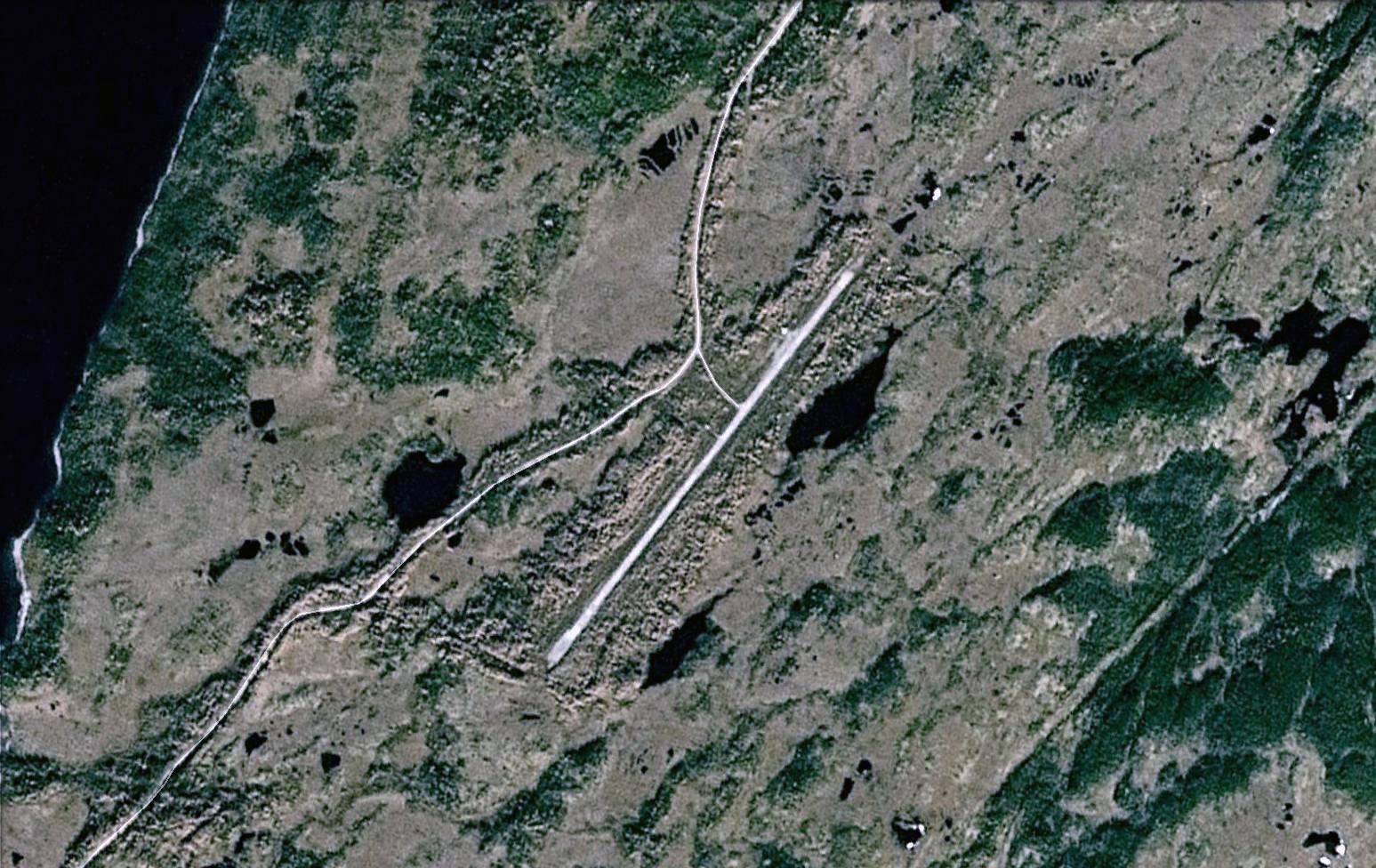
Bay d'Espoir Aerodrome

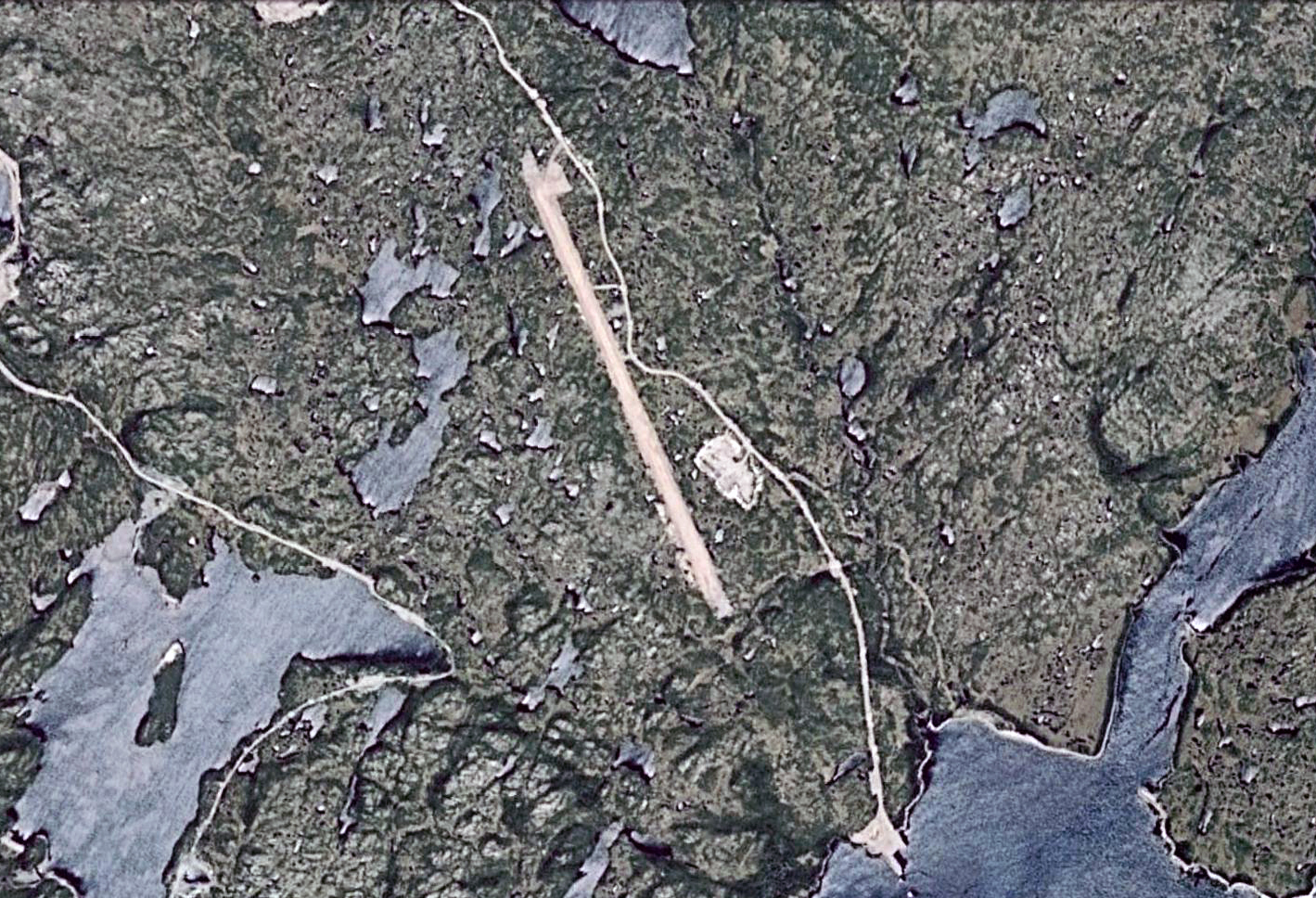
Hope Brook Aerodrome

Community	Airport name	ICAO	TC LID	IATA	Coordinates
Argentia	Naval Station Argentia	CWAR		NWP	47°18′22″N 053°59′24″W
Argentia	McAndrew Air Force Base				47°17′09″N 053°58′53″W
Bay d'Espoir Hydroelectric Power Station	Bay d'Espoir Aerodrome		CCX4		47°57′30″N 055°51′14″W
Bonavista	Bonavista Aerodrome	CWVA			48°34′00″N 053°03′27″W
Botwood	RCAF Station Botwood				49°09′11″N 055°20′24″W
Buchans	Buchans Airport	CYZM			48°50′50″N 056°50′20″W
Churchill Falls Generating Station	Michelin Falls Aerodrome				53°37′39″N 064°29′17″W
Davis Inlet	Davis Inlet Aerodrome		CCB4	YDI	55°53′51″N 060°54′28″W
Emeril	Ross Bay Junction Airport				53°01′43″N 066°14′40″W
Hope Brook Gold Mine	Hope Brook Aerodrome				47°43′21″N 058°03′33″W
Livingston	Livingston Aerodrome				53°55′41″N 066°27′39″W
Menihek Hydroelectric Generating Station	Menihek Aerodrome				54°27′15″N 066°35′35″W
Mid-Canada Line Site 212	Border Beacon				55°19′59″N 063°12′16″W
Paradise River	Paradise River Airport		CDF4	YDE	53°25′38″N 057°13′51″W
Saglek Bay	Saglek Airport (CFS Saglek)	CYSV		YSV	58°28′28″N 062°39′15″W
St. John's	Pepperrell Air Force Base				47°35′10″N 052°41′31″W
Stephenville	Ernest Harmon Air Force Base				48°32′29″N 058°33′00″W
Twin Falls	Twin Falls Aerodrome				53°29′19″N 064°30′45″W
William's Harbour	Williams Harbour Airport		CCA6		52°34′03″N 055°47′06″W
