= CCP2 =

CCP2 may stand for:

- Compact Camera Port 2 – an electrical and data interface standard for cameras used in Mobile phones, defined by Standard Mobile Imaging Architecture (SMIA)

Other uses:

- Exploits Valley (Botwood) Airport – An airport with a Transport Canada Location Identifier of "CCP2"
