= Williams Harbour Airport =

Former airfield in William's Harbour, Newfoundland and Labrador

- IATA: YWM; ICAO: none

Summary
- Airport type: Public
- Operator: Government of Newfoundland and Labrador
- Location: William's Harbour, Newfoundland and Labrador
- Time zone: NST (UTC−03:30)
  - Summer (DST): NDT (UTC−02:30)
- Elevation AMSL: 73 ft (22 m)
- Coordinates: 52°34′03″N 055°47′06″W

Map
- Location in Newfoundland and Labrador CCA6 (Canada)

Runways
| Direction | Length | | Surface |
| Direction | ft | m | Surface |
|---|---|---|---|
| 14/32 | 2,273 | 693 | Gravel |
- Source: Canada Flight Supplement

Williams Harbour Airport IATA: YWM, TC LID: CCA6 is an abandoned airport located adjacent to William's Harbour, Newfoundland and Labrador, Canada. The community was entirely resettled in 2017.

== Former airlines and destinations ==
| Airlines | Destinations |
|---|---|
| Air Labrador | Black Tickle, Cartwright, Charlottetown (NL), Fox Harbour, Goose Bay, Mary's Harbour, Port Hope Simpson, St. Anthony |
