= CYCA =

CYCA may refer to:

- Cruising Yacht Club of Australia
- CYCA, ICAO code for Cartwright Airport, Newfoundland and Labrador, Canada
