= YSO =

YSO may refer to:

- Yale Symphony Orchestra
- Young stellar object
- Postville Airport, Postville, Labrador, Canada (IATA airport code)
