= PAL Airlines =

Regional airline in Canada

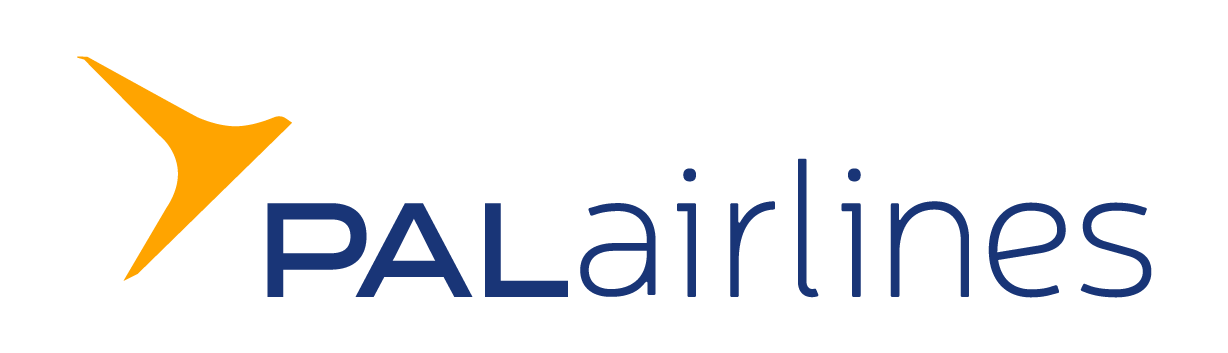

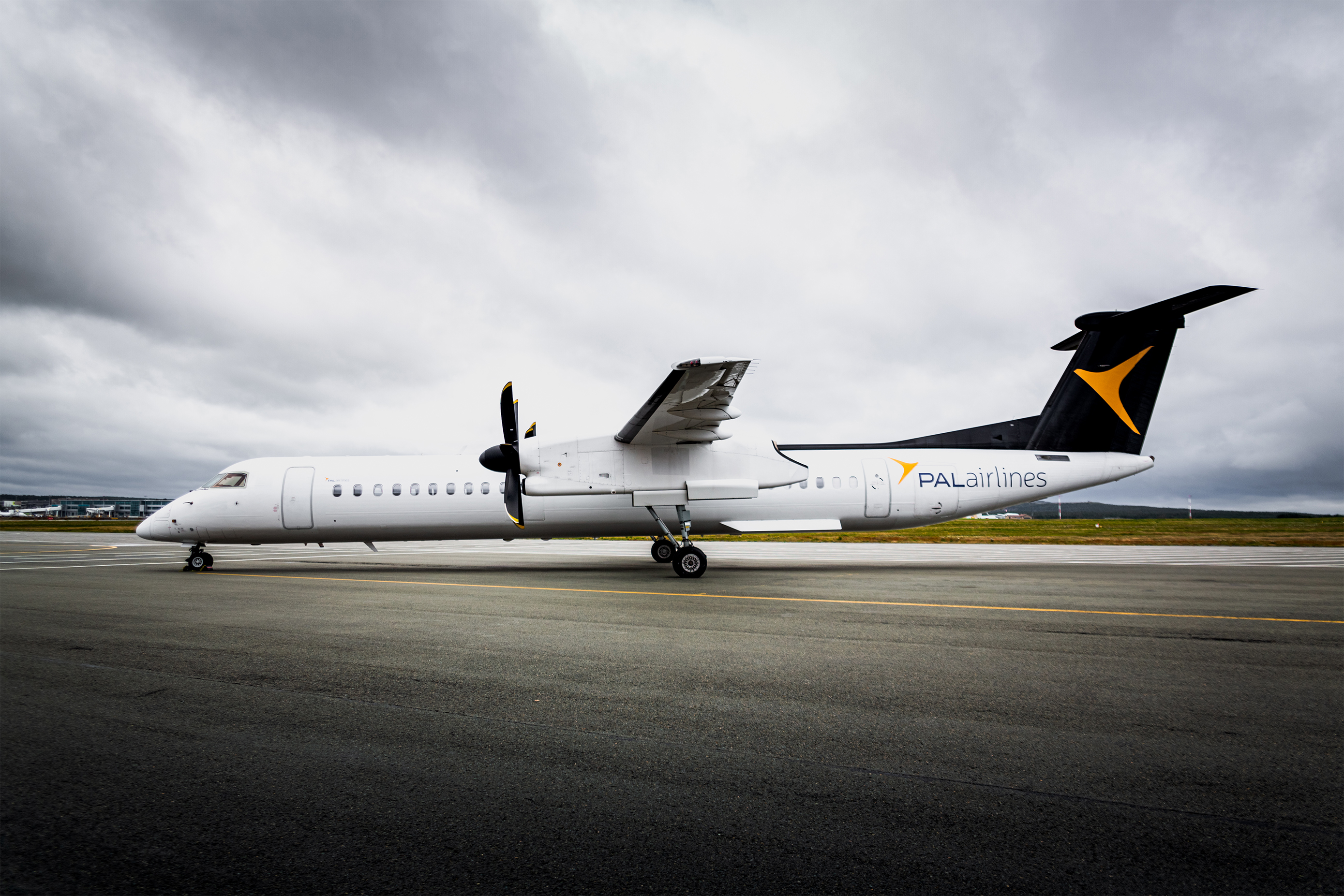
IATA	ICAO	Call sign
PB	PVL	PROVINCIAL
- Founded: August 1974; 52 years ago
- AOC #: 2569
- Operating bases: Goose Bay; Halifax; Montréal–Trudeau; St. John's; Wabush
- Frequent-flyer program: Aeroplan
- Subsidiaries: Air Borealis; PAL Aerospace
- Fleet size: 58 (24 PAL Airlines, 23 PAL Aerospace, 11 Air Borealis)
- Destinations: 22 (15 by PAL and 7 by Air Borealis)
- Parent company: Exchange Income Corporation
- Headquarters: St. John's International Airport; St. John's, Newfoundland and Labrador
- Website: www.palairlines.ca; www.airborealis.ca/en/; www.palaerospace.com/en

PAL Airlines (formerly Provincial Airlines and stylized as PALairlines) is a Canadian regional airline with headquarters at St. John's International Airport in St John's, Newfoundland and Labrador, Canada. PAL operates scheduled passenger, cargo, air ambulance and charter services. PAL is the commercial airline arm of the PAL Group of Companies. In addition to its head office, it also has bases in Halifax, Nova Scotia (Halifax Stanfield International Airport), Happy Valley-Goose Bay (CFB Goose Bay), Montreal, Quebec (Montréal–Trudeau International Airport) and Kitchener, Ontario (Waterloo Regional Airport). However, PAL only operates charter flights out of the latter airport. PAL is the second largest regional airline operator in Eastern Canada next to Jazz Aviation.

== History ==
The airline was established in August 1974 as a flight training and charter operator. Scheduled airline operations began in 1980. In the 1980s, the company also developed its airborne maritime surveillance division, which operated until 1989 as Atlantic Airways. In 1988, it acquired Eastern Flying Service (established in 1956 and operating an extensive air courier network and charter services). From 1995 to 1997 it used the brand Interprovincial Airlines to operate scheduled regional airline services in a commercial agreement with Air Nova. The Provincial Airlines brand was restored in 1997 to enhance network growth and focus on regional air transport needs. In 1988 PAL Airlines joined with the Innu Development Limited Partnership, to establish Innu Mikun Airlines, which grew to be the largest Labrador based air carrier providing charter services throughout Labrador and scheduled airline services to coastal Labrador communities. In 2017 PAL Airlines, Innu Development LP, and NGC Nunatsiavut established Air Borealis through a merger of Innu Mikun Airlines and Air Labrador to enhance indigenous aviation, expand and improve regional transportation infrastructure, and foster community economic growth.

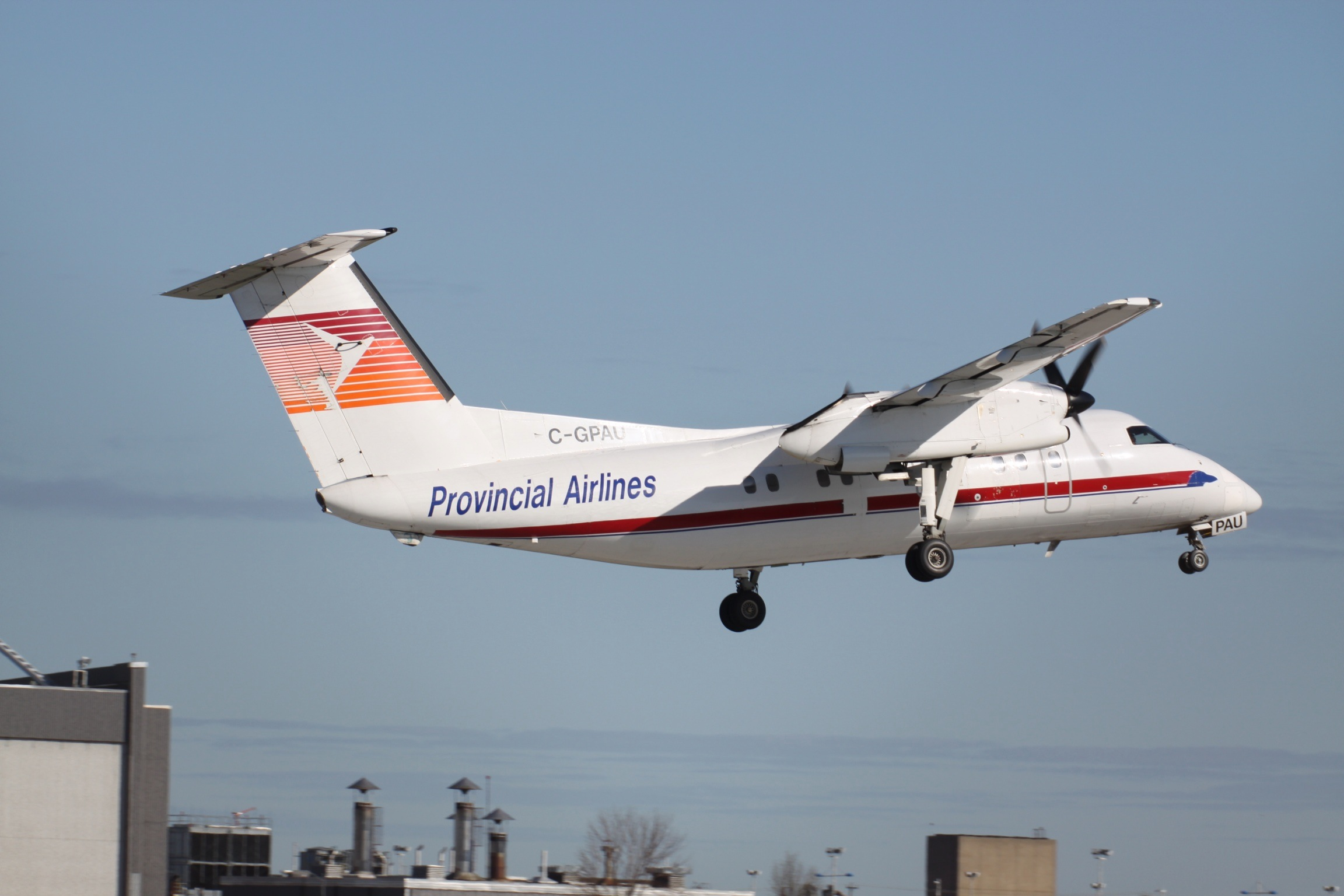
Provincial Airlines Dash-8 departs Montréal–Trudeau International Airport in 2010

In its early years, the company operated light aircraft such as the Piper Navajo and the Britten-Norman Islander around Atlantic Canada. In 1988, the company introduced Fairchild Metroliners, initially for courier services and in 1989 in scheduled passenger services, eventually building one of the larger Metro fleets through the success of the aircraft in building regional air passenger traffic. From 1996 to 1998, it operated a Convair 580 for courier and cargo services. In 1995 the first DHC-6 Twin Otters were purchased for services in Labrador. In 2001, PAL took the delivery of its first Saab 340 aircraft. This meant that PAL Airlines had become a 705 carrier, as per the Canadian Aviation Regulations, maintained by Transport Canada, and thus the first class of flight attendants were trained at this time. The airline added to its 705 fleet three years later when the company was awarded the Vale Canada contract for the Voisey's Bay Mine in Labrador. This contract required the use of De Havilland Canada Dash 8s which began to arrive in 2004. Provincial eventually added more Dash 8s as part of the airline's scheduled air service.

On March 12, 2009, one of PAL Aerospace's Maritime Patrol Aircraft was first on the scene of Cougar Helicopters Flight 91's ditching, flying "top cover" until other help could arrive, leading to the rescue of the sole survivor.

Between 2011 and 2012, the company divided into two operating segments. Remaining under the same ownership, two separate corporate divisions were formed: PAL Aerospace and PAL Airlines. Provincial Aerospace remains as the parent company. PAL Aerospace is an international aerospace and defence contractor with maritime patrol and intelligence, surveillance, and reconnaissance operations in Canada, Curaçao, under contract to the Netherlands Ministry of Defence, and the United Arab Emirates. The Cessna Citation jets, and the charter and MEDIVAC King Airs are also operated by PAL Aerospace. PAL Aerospace is a specialty operator (Part 702, 703, and 704). PAL Aerospace has the MRO operations providing integration, modification, and maintenance and overhaul services. PAL Airlines is focused on regional airline operations with 704 and 705 aircraft which in 2011 consisted of Dash-8s, Twin Otters, and a Metroliner, at four bases in St. John's, Halifax, Goose Bay, and Montreal.

In November 2014, the company was purchased by Exchange Income Corporation, a Toronto Stock Exchange (TSX)-listed stock that owns regional airlines and several manufacturing companies, for a combination of cash and stock worth about $246 million.

In June 2017, PAL Airlines established Air Borealis LP in partnership with the Innu, the First Nations people of Labrador (through Innu Development LP) and the government of Nunatsiavut (through the Nunatsiavut Group of Companies). Air Borealis operates a large fleet of Series 300 Twin Otter in regional airline and charter operations in Labrador. In 2020, Air Borealis established a rotary wing division providing charter helicopter services throughout Labrador.

In July 2023, PAL Airlines became a service provider for Air Canada Express for flights in Eastern Canada. On October 1, 2024, PAL Airlines completed its inaugural transborder Air Canada Express flight, having departed Halifax Stanfield International Airport for Newark Liberty International Airport and Boston Logan International Airport.

On January 9, 2026, Air Canada and PAL renewed the capacity purchase agreement through 2032, adding five additional Q400s into Air Canada Express' fleet, as well as protecting services from Montréal–Trudeau International Airport to destinations in Quebec and New Brunswick.

== Bases and operations ==
=== PAL Airlines bases ===
St. John's International Airport: PAL operates Dash 8s, King Airs, Beechcraft 1900s as well as aircraft from the aerospace side of the company out of St. John's. PAL Airlines operates two hangars in St. John's and shares one, Hangar 2, with the aerospace division. Hangar 2 houses Dash 8s and the Metroliner; Hangar 3 holds Dash 8 maintenance. Hangar 4 previously housed a number of departments, however, in August 2023, PAL began leasing the previous Zellers and Target Canada building, located on Stavanger Drive in St. John's. This building is now occupied by a majority of PAL's departments, including accounting, finance, IT, reservations, Human Resources, crew scheduling, training and dispatch. Building maintenance, PAL Cargo, chief pilot and Fisheries and Oceans Canada (DFO) of PAL Airlines, flight attendant management, System Operational Control Centre (SOCC), and a Shell Canada, a PAL owned fixed-base operator (FBO), still operate from Hangar 4. Hangar 4 can also be rented to store aircraft.

Halifax Stanfield International Airport: PAL operates one hangar in Halifax, which houses a Dash 8. This hangar is shared with the Aerospace Division and its aircraft as well. PAL also operates an Esso Avitat FBO at this hangar. The hangar also has management offices and a crew room.

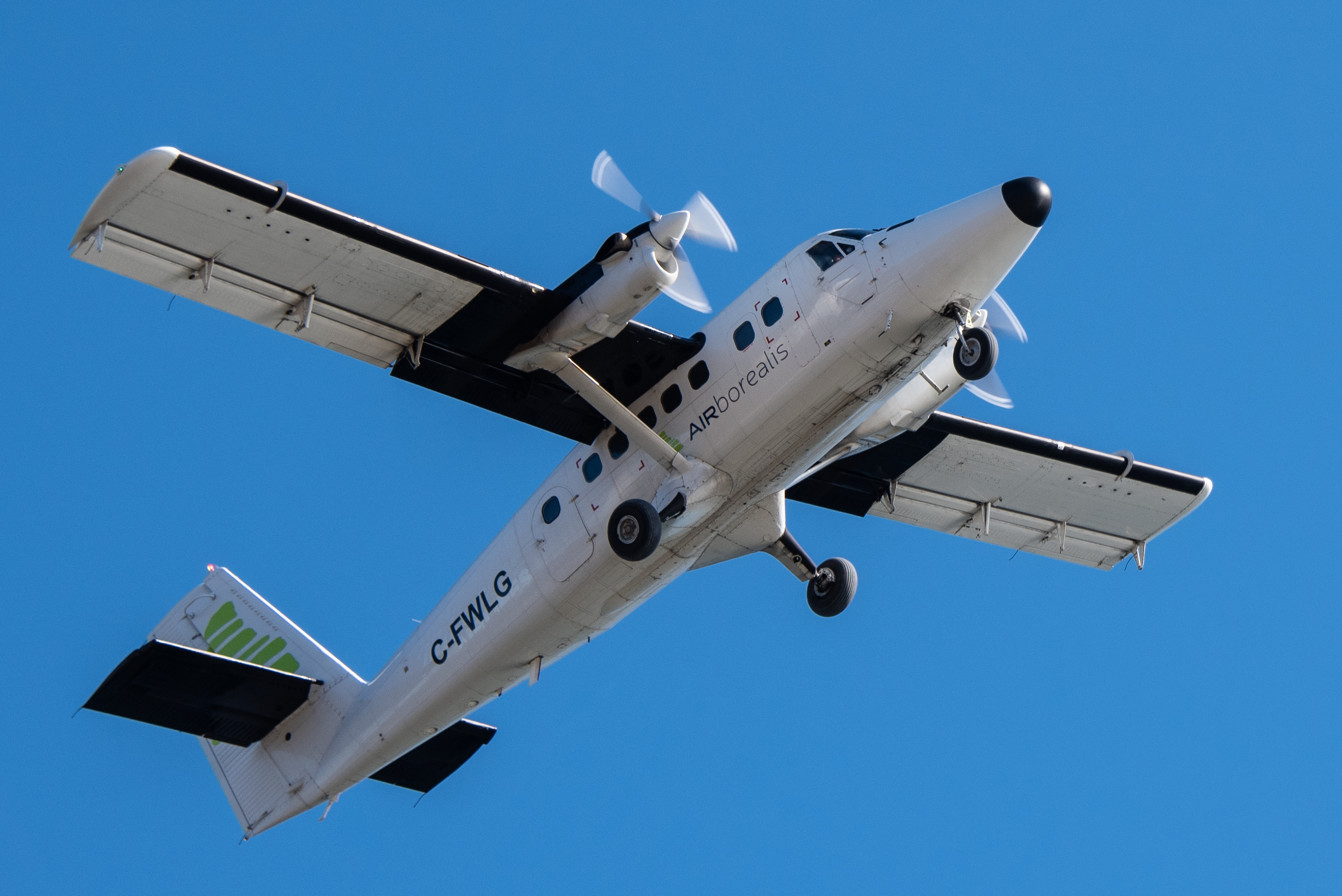
Air Borealis (PAL Airlines) DHC-6 Twin Otter, 2017

Goose Bay Airport: Goose Bay is home to PAL Airlines Twin Otter operation under the name of Air Borealis. PAL owns two hangars in Goose Bay. Hangar 14 houses the aircraft groomers, aircraft maintenance for Twin Otters (all PAL aircraft can be serviced in Goose Bay), crew room and dispatch. Hangar 18 in Goose Bay houses the Voisey's Bay check-in desk for the daily charter the Dash 8 provides to Voisey's Bay Aerodrome at the Voisey's Bay Mine in Voisey's Bay, northern Labrador. PAL Cargo, Air Borealis charters and management offices are also in Hangar 18.

Montréal–Trudeau International Airport: PAL Airlines operates from the Starlink Aviation hangar at Montreal's Trudeau airport. The hangar houses Dash 8s for scheduled and charter service throughout Quebec.

=== PAL Aerospace bases ===
- St. John's International Airport: Hangars 1 and 6 in St. John's are owned by Provincial Aerospace. Hangar 2 houses the Cessna Citation II MEDIVAC, and four Maritime Surveillance (AMSD) King Air 200's. It is shared with the airline division's Dash 8s and Metroliner. Hangar 2 also has the offices of the chief pilot of the AMSD Division, other managers and part of the IT department. Hangar 1 houses the Cessna Citation X and the office of the chief pilot of the jet division and DFO of PAL Aerospace). It also accommodates a Shell FBO and executive offices. The training department for both Aerospace and Airlines is also located in Hangar 1. Hangar 6 is home to PMMD, Provincial's internationally known modification division. This hangar contains a variety of aircraft that PAL is contracted to modify or restore). The accounting department is located 7 km (4.3 mi) from the hangars in the Prince Charles Building.
- Halifax Stanfield International Airport: Provincial Aerospace and PAL Airlines share a hangar in Halifax which houses one of PAL Aerospace's King Air 200 Maritime Surveillance aircraft, another King Air 200 MEDIVAC aircraft and two King Air 350 charter aircraft. Provincial Aerospace also has a training base located 3 km (1.9 mi) from the hangar in Halifax for the radar operators of two Dash 8s being operated in the Middle East and the King Air radar operators in Canada. The charter department, which operates the King Air 350's, Citation X and other Provincial Airlines aircraft at its disposal, is also located at the Hangar in Halifax.
- CFB Comox: The hangar in Comox, British Columbia is part of CFB Comox and is the base of one of Provincial Aerospace's King Air 200 maritime surveillance aircraft and its pilots.
- Curaçao International Airport: Provincial has a maritime surveillance base in Curaçao, Kingdom of the Netherlands, where it operates two Dash 8s under contract for the Dutch Government. PAL aircraft in Curaçao use the call signs "Coast Guard" (for routine patrols or search and rescue operations) and "SAM" (which stands for Special Air Missions when on a classified mission which can be launched without filing a flight plan).
- Abu Dhabi, UAE: Provincial has pilots and maintenance of two Dash 8s modified by PMMD in the Middle East based in Abu Dhabi, UAE. The crews are not based permanently in Abu Dhabi: they operate on a rotation from Canada. The UAE aircraft use the call sign "Sea Lord".

== Cargo ==
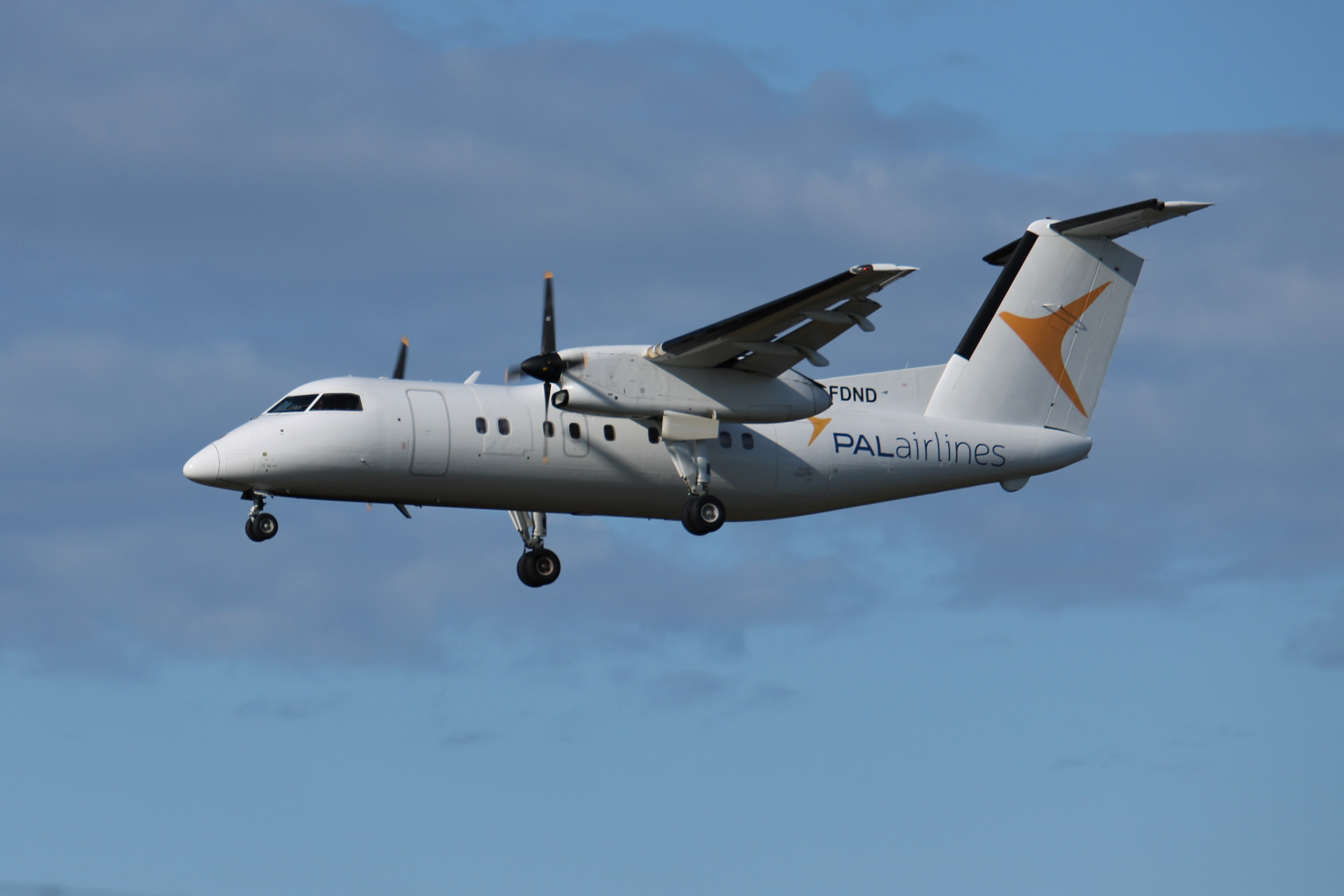
PAL Airlines De Havilland DHC-8-100

PAL Airlines offers cargo service to all of its destinations. St. John's and Goose Bay each operate a full cargo facility. The Metroliner is PAL's dedicated cargo aircraft and operate daily cargo flights throughout Newfoundland and Labrador. The Twin Otters also are used for cargo flights along the Labrador Coast. For destinations in the Maritimes and Quebec, cargo is moved on scheduled flights. The Dash 8-100's are also capable of being converted to fly as a passenger/cargo combination.

== Charters ==
Provincial Aerospace has three aircraft dedicated to charters. The aircraft in the PAL Airlines fleet are also often used for larger charters. PAL has flown charters all over North America and to Africa. Air Borealis also has its own charter division which flies charters along the coast of Labrador and Northern Quebec and specializes in off-strip charters and float operations.

== Aerospace and defence company ==
PAL Aerospace is an international aerospace and defence company. It is responsible for providing the Royal Canadian Air Force (RCAF) with in-service support for the CC-295 Kingfisher variant of the Airbus C295 (previously CASA C-295) search and rescue fleet.

PAL Aerospace is working with Bombardier Aviation in offering a Canadian-built solution, Bombardier Global P-6, to replace the Lockheed CP-140 Aurora as the RCAF's maritime patrol aircraft. According to PAL they have marketed the De Havilland Canada Dash 8-based P-4 MPA (DHC-8 MPA-D8) to smaller militaries and coast guards requiring maritime patrol capability.

== Destinations ==
As of November 18, 2025, PAL Airlines and Air Borealis serve 21 communities in Newfoundland and Labrador, New Brunswick, and Quebec.

On August 8, 2025, CBC News reported that PAL, along with the Government of Canada and the provincial governments of Prince Edward Island, New Brunswick and Nova Scotia, had signed an agreement to resume air service connecting Halifax, Nova Scotia, Sydney, Nova Scotia, Charlottetown, Fredericton and Moncton. At the time of the announcement no start date had been set.

Province	Community	Airport	Notes
Newfoundland and Labrador	Churchill Falls	Churchill Falls Airport	
Newfoundland and Labrador	Deer Lake	Deer Lake Regional Airport	
Newfoundland and Labrador	Gander	Gander International Airport	
Newfoundland and Labrador	Happy Valley-Goose Bay	Goose Bay Airport	Hub, both airlines
Newfoundland and Labrador	Hopedale	Hopedale Airport	Air Borealis only
Newfoundland and Labrador	Makkovik	Makkovik Airport	Air Borealis only
Newfoundland and Labrador	Nain	Nain Airport	Air Borealis only
Newfoundland and Labrador	Natuashish	Natuashish Airport	Air Borealis only
Newfoundland and Labrador	Postville	Postville Airport	Air Borealis only
Newfoundland and Labrador	Rigolet	Rigolet Airport	Air Borealis only
Newfoundland and Labrador	St. Anthony	St. Anthony Airport	
Newfoundland and Labrador	St. John's	St. John's International Airport	Hub
Newfoundland and Labrador	Wabush	Wabush Airport	
New Brunswick	Moncton	Greater Moncton Roméo LeBlanc International Airport	
Quebec	Blanc-Sablon	Lourdes-de-Blanc-Sablon Airport	
Quebec	Gaspé	Michel-Pouliot Gaspé Airport	
Quebec	Îles-de-la-Madeleine	Îles-de-la-Madeleine Airport	
Quebec	Mont-Joli	Mont-Joli Airport	
Quebec	Montreal	Montréal–Trudeau International Airport	Hub
Quebec	Quebec City	Québec City Jean Lesage International Airport	
Quebec	Sept-Îles	Sept-Îles Airport	

=== Interline agreements ===
- Air Canada
- WestJet

== Fleet ==
As of August 31, 2026, the following aircraft are listed by Transport Canada as being registered to Air Borealis, PAL Airlines, and PAL Aerospace:

=== Air Borealis ===
ICAO airline designator: LBR. Telephony (callsign): NORTHLIGHT.

Air Borealis fleet
Aircraft	In service	Orders	Variants	Passengers	Notes
De Havilland Canada DHC-6-300	11	—	Series 300	19	
Total	11	—			

=== PAL Airlines ===
ICAO airline designator: PVL. Telephony (callsign): PROVINCIAL.

PAL Airlines fleet
Aircraft	In service	Orders	Variants	Passengers	Notes
De Havilland Canada Dash 8	24	—	2 - Series 100 (102, 106); 3 - Series 300 (311, 314, 315); 19 - Q400 (402)	37; 50; 76	Seven of the Q400 are operated for Air Canada Express
Total	20	—			

=== PAL Aerospace ===
ICAO airline designator: SPR. Telephony (callsign): SPEEDAIR.

PAL Aerospace fleet
Aircraft	In service	Orders	Variants	Passengers	Notes
Beechcraft 1900	2	—	1900D		
Beechcraft Super King Air	16	—	9 - 200 series 7 - 300 series		
Bombardier Challenger 600 series	1	—	CL-604		
Cessna Citation II	1	—	Citation S/II (S550)		
De Havilland Canada Dash 8	6	—	5 - Series 100 (102, 106); 1 - Series 300 (315)		Operated in MPA and ISR operations
Gulfstream G280	1	—	—		
Total	27	—			

== Historical fleet ==
Former aircraft flown include:

- Britten-Norman Islander
- Convair 580
- Piper PA-31 Navajo
- Piper PA-34 Seneca
- Saab 340
- Swearingen Merlin

== Accidents and incidents ==
- On December 28, 2024, a De Havilland Dash 8-400, registered as C-GPNA, operating for Air Canada Express as Flight 2259, from St. John's International Airport to Halifax Stanfield International Airport, lost the wheels from the left side main under wing gear upon departure from St. John's. The loss of the wheels was not discovered prior to landing in Halifax, and the aircraft landed on just the strut on the left side on runway 23. All 77 occupants were safely evacuated to a nearby hangar. Halifax Stanfield was temporarily closed, forcing several flights to divert to nearby airports for a short time.
