= South Shore Regional Centre for Education =

Public school board in Nova Scotia, Canada

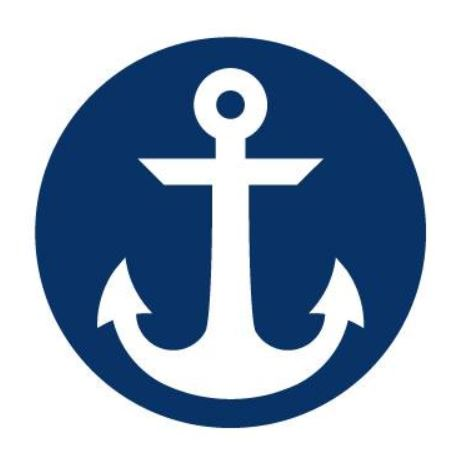

Location
- Bridgewater, Nova Scotia Canada

District information
- Regional Executive Director of Education: Paul Ash
- Schools: 34

Students and staff
- Students: 6,471 (2015-16)

Other information
- Website: ssrce.ca

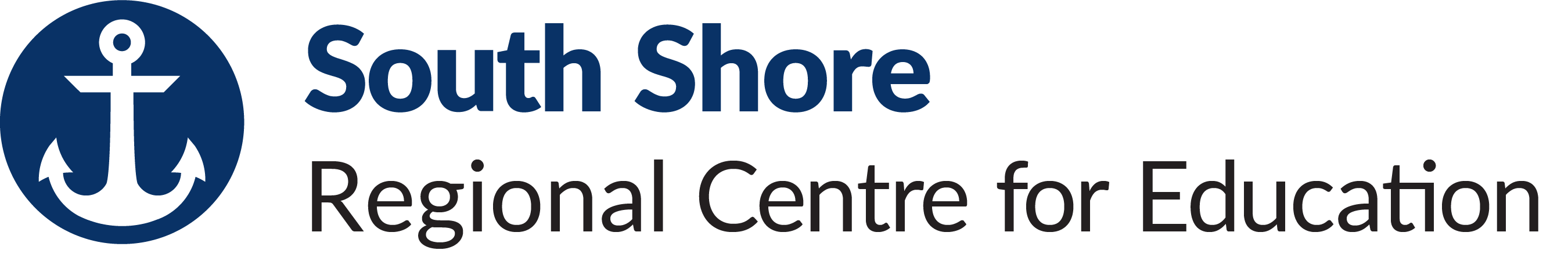

The South Shore Regional Centre for Education (SSRCE) is the public school board responsible for the administration of elementary, junior high, and high school education in Lunenburg County and Queens County in Nova Scotia, Canada. The South Shore Regional Centre for Education was established on April 1, 2018 by the Nova Scotia Education Reform Act. It replaced the South Shore Regional School Board which was created August 1, 2004 by an Act of the provincial legislature.

== Enrolments ==
As of 2020 the school board had an enrolment of over 12,886 students enrolled in elementary, junior and senior schools.

== Controversies ==
=== Religious discrimination ===
On May 3, 2012, the South Shore Regional School Board (the precursor to the South Shore Regional Centre for Education) drew attention to itself in the Canadian media for allowing a student from Forest Heights Community School to be suspended by the school's principal for wearing a T-shirt that had the words, "Life is wasted without Jesus" on it, drawing criticism that it was discriminating against Christians and violating the boy's Charter rights to freedom of expression and religion. The T-shirt was an expression of the scriptural passage from the St. Paul's Letter to the Philippians 3:8, which says, "More than that, I even consider everything as a loss because of the supreme good of knowing Christ Jesus my Lord. For his sake I have accepted the loss of all things and I consider them so much rubbish, that I may gain Christ....".

On May 4, 2012, the South Shore Regional School Board decided to allow the boy to return to school on the following Monday and gave him permission to wear the shirt at school. They also hired a facilitator to deal with the issue; however, reports by CTV News indicated that the boy was not sure he wanted to return to school, feeling both discriminated against by administrators and bullied.

=== Verbal attack on hearing impaired student ===
In 2018 Fred Forsyth, a teacher of the Bayview Community School, repeatedly verbally attacked Amy Bennett, a hearing impaired student of the same school, after she went to the bathroom for a prolonged time. Accusing her of skipping classes, he yelled at her for a couple of minutes. The parents of Amy Bennett claimed that the incident caused permanent damage to her ears due to the fact that her hearing aid magnifies certain noises and caused a permanent tinnitus. The incident escalated up to Education Minister Zach Churchill, who made a public statement condemning the teacher for his behavior while denying to meet neither the student nor her parents. Despite a nine month long investigation of the accident, there was no public statement made regarding the disciplinary actions against the teacher to protect the privacy of the teacher.

== Schools ==
=== Lunenburg County ===
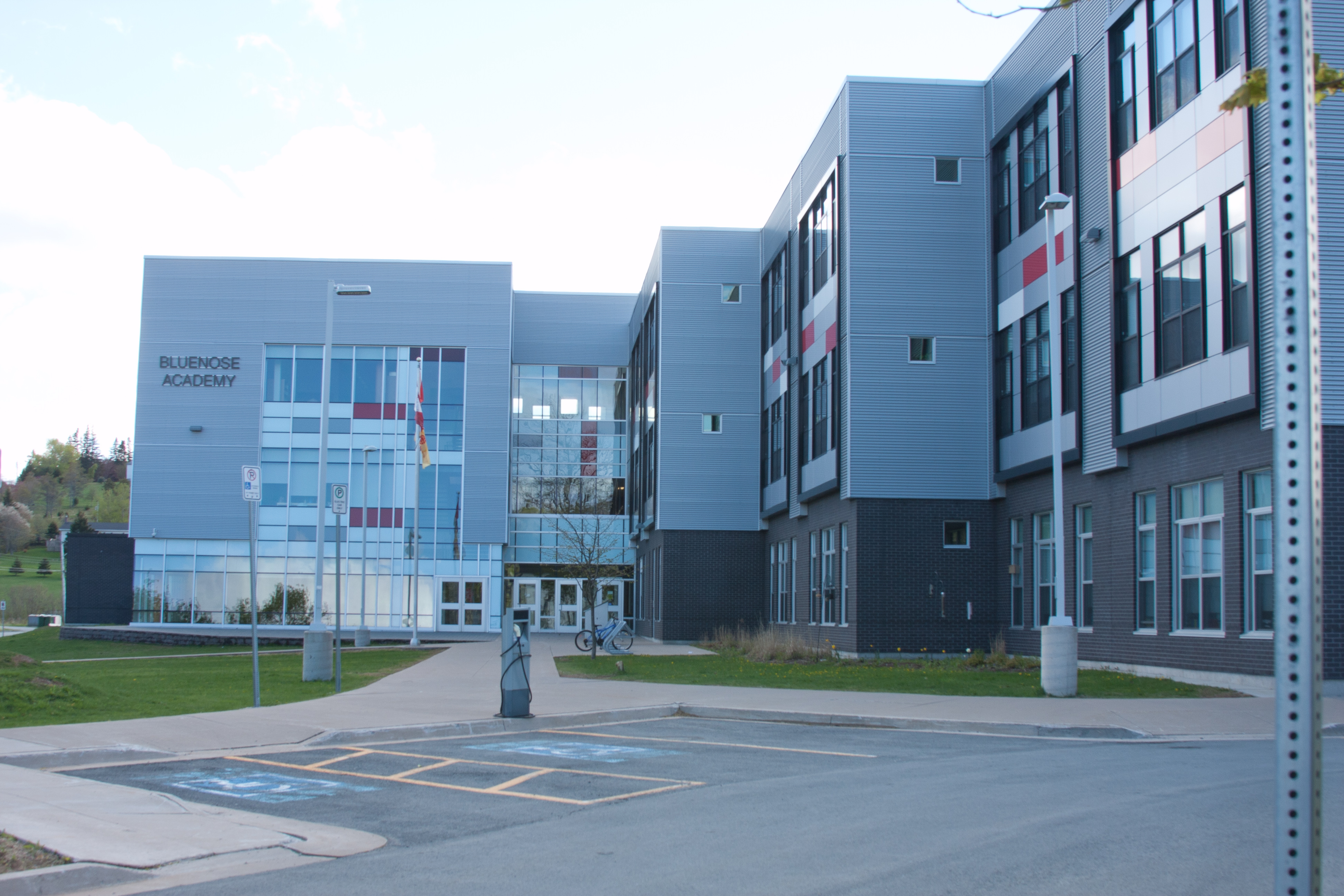
Bluenose Academy school in Lunenburg, Nova Scotia

- Aspotogan Elementary, pr. to 5, Mill Cove
- Bayview Community School, pr. to 9, Mahone Bay
- Big Tancook Elementary, pr. to 5, Tancook Island
- Bluenose Academy, pr. to 9 Lunenburg
- Bridgewater Elementary, pr. to 6, Bridgewater
- Bridgewater Junior High, 7 to 9, Bridgewater
- Centre Consolidated, pr. to 9, Lunenburg (closed 2012)
- Chester Area Middle School (CAMS), 6 to 8, Chester
- Chester District Elementary, pr. to 5, Chester
- Forest Heights Community School, 9 to 12, Chester Basin
- Gold River-Western Shore Elementary, pr. to 5, Western Shore (closed in 2013)
- Hebbville Academy, pr. to 9, Hebbville
- New Germany Elementary, pr. to 6, New Germany
- New Germany Rural High School, 7 to 12, New Germany
- New Ross Consolidated, pr. to 8, New Ross
- Newcombville Elementary, pr. to 4, Newcombville
- Park View Education Centre, 10 to 12, Bridgewater
- Pentz Elementary, pr. to 6, Pentz
- Petite Rivière Elementary, pr. to 6, Petite Rivière
- Riverport District Elementary, pr. to 6, Riverport (closed September 2011)
- West Northfield Elementary, pr. to 6, Bridgewater

=== Adult & Alternative Education Programs ===
- Bridgewater Adult High School, (NSCC Lunenburg Campus), Bridgewater
- Queens County Adult Program, (Rossignol Centre), Bridgewater
- Mahone Bay Centre (Junior/Senior Alternate Programs), Mahone Bay

=== Queens County ===
- Dr. John C. Wickwire Academy, pr. to 5, Liverpool
- Greenfield Elementary, pr. to 6, Caledonia
- Liverpool Regional High School, 9 to 12, Liverpool
- Mill Village Elementary, pr. to 6, Mill Village - (closed)
- Milton Centennial, pr. to 2, Milton - (closed)
- North Queens Elementary, pr. to 6, Caledonia (Destroyed by fire September 14, 2006 - re-opened 2008)
- North Queens High, 7 to 12, Caledonia
- South Queens Junior High, 6 to 8, Liverpool

== See also ==
- List of Nova Scotia schools
- Education in Canada
