= Dany Pen =

Canadian human rights activist, artist and educator

Dany Pen (born September 22, 1986) is a Khmer-Canadian human rights activist, artist and educator.

== Early life ==
Dany Pen was born to a Cambodian refugee family who arrived in America in the 1980s. She spent the first few years of her childhood living in Toronto, Ontario, Canada under the sanctuary of the Catholic Church with her mother. In the late 1980s, Pen and her mother were transitioned into the community of St. Jamestown by the Toronto Housing Corporation. In 1995, she and her mother were relocated again to the housing projects of Regent Park.

At the age of 12, Pen was nominated by her school for the Toronto Star Honderich Award. The submission of her essay "Pride in the Ghetto" granted her the award and a full academic scholarship from the University of Toronto.

Pen began using art as a platform for her political and social agendas. She then decided to transfer her University of Toronto scholarship to attend OCAD University. She completed her Bachelor of Fine Arts degree at OCAD in sculpture and installation and was honoured with the "Faculty Chair" award upon graduation.

== Career ==
After graduating from OCAD, Pen had her first solo art show at The Board of Directors in Toronto.

The spotlight gave her the opportunity to also showcase her work at XPACE Gallery in conjunction with the CONTACT Photography Festival in Canada and a solo show at the Society of Arts in Bermuda.

Her art show titled "Deja Vu 1965" in Bermuda caught the attention of art critic Charles Zuill, who compared her works to that of post-impressionist artist Paul Gauguin.

== Artistic work ==
Her artwork Erasures, influenced by the history of the Cambodian genocide and the Khmer Rouge regime, was featured in the 2012 Bermuda Biennial.

Her artwork Grooming Goods, which spoke to slavery and consumerism, was selected and featured in the 2014 International Bermuda Biennial.

Her Self-Portrait and Family artwork series, which also comments on her family history with the Cambodian genocide, were featured in the 2015 Charman exhibition at the Museum of Masterworks. She was also previously awarded the 2013 Charman Prize for the artist with "Best Source of Inspiration".

Her artwork Last Breath featured in the 2016 Bermuda Biennial.

== Political and social work ==
In 2006, Pen became involved with June Callwood Centre (formerly known as Jessie's Centre) and began advocating for the rights of young mothers and the protection of young girls from sexual abuse. The same year, Pen explicitly spoke out for women's rights and addressed the North York Community Council, the City of Toronto government, and the City of North York to provide adequate housing to young single mothers in the city of Toronto and North York. Her advocacy was challenged by the Bayview community, but the city councilors' vote resulted in the approval of the building permits.

In 2016, Pen was appointed to serve on the Human Rights Commission as a commissioner in Bermuda. As the Human Rights Commissioner, Pen held special interests in women's rights, gender equality and education.

Also in 2016, Pen founded the international advocacy group called Women's A.C.T (action, change, today) This organization is about equality, justice, empowerment and support for women who are survivors of sexual assault, violence and domestic abuse.

Notably and controversially, on April 9, 2021, VICE Media Group published an article titled, "These People Were Arrested by the Khmer Rouge and Never Seen Again," featuring photos of Tuol Sleng victims with their faces manipulated — erased and subjectively colorized — by Matt Loughrey, a "self-taught artist". The photos were used without the community's consent, including many of the surviving family members of those murdered at the Tuol Sleng execution site. Pen, along with other members of the Cambodian community, launched an international petition demanding that Loughrey and VICE Media Group issue an apology to the Cambodian community. The petition amassed over 10,000 signatures worldwide, with press releases in the New York Times Washington Post, BBC News, and Southeast Asian Globe. The petition received worldwide support and direct support from the Kingdom of Cambodia, which released its own international public statement. Pen and VICE Media Group were able to reconcile the situation through private meetings. VICE issued a public and private apology

== Awards ==
In 2006, Pen was recognized by the City of Toronto government and former Mayor David Miller for her philanthropic work and advocacy for women's rights.

In 2016, she was honored with the "World Builder" award from OCAD University, Canada, which is the highest honors for alumni achievement. The "World Builder" award is bestowed upon individuals who have made substantive humanitarian contributions to their community and culture; individuals who are active in supporting global causes.

In 2017, Pen was nominated as "Woman of the Year" in Bermuda at the Women's Empowerment Summit, hosted by Today in Bermuda. She was recognized for her ongoing advocacy for women's rights.
