= LRHS =

LRHS may refer to:

Canada:

- Laurentian Regional High School, in Lachute, Quebec
- Liverpool Regional High School, in Liverpool, Nova Scotia
- Lockeport Regional High School, in Lockeport, Nova Scotia

United States:

- La Reine High School, in Suitland, Prince George's County, Maryland,
- Lakeland Regional High School, in Passaic County, New Jersey
- Lake Ridge High School, in Mansfield, Texas
- Lakewood Ranch High School, in Bradenton, Florida
- Leesville Road High School, in Raleigh, North Carolina
- Lenape Regional High School, in Medford, New Jersey
- Loch Raven High School, in Towson, Maryland
- Logan-Rogersville High School, in Rogersville, Missouri
- Long Reach High School, in Columbia, Maryland
