= Forest Heights Community School =

Coordinates: 44.600326°N 64.321276°W

Information
- School type: High school
- Established: 1992; 34 years ago
- Staff: 38 (including teachers)
- Teaching staff: 22
- Grades: 9-12
- Enrollment: 272 (2013-2014)

Forest Heights Community School is a high school located in Chester Basin, Nova Scotia, Canada. Servicing students and families from eastern Lunenburg County, it is a member school of the South Shore Regional School Board.

== Background ==
Forest Heights Community School, often referred to as FHCS or Forest Heights, was founded in 1992 as part of an amalgamation due to the closing of Chester High School and New Ross High School located in two nearby communities. Forest Heights is seeded by two middle schools – Chester Area Middle School and New Ross Consolidated School. Although students from Chester and New Ross make up the bulk of the student body, other communities serviced by Forest Heights include Chester Grant, Western Shore, Tancook Island, Hubbards, Fox Point, Mill Cove, and Blandford. Forest Heights is actually in Chester Grant, just past the Chester Basin/Chester Grant road signs.

== Enrollment ==
Given the rural location of FHCS the student body has historically hovered around the 400 student mark with all students having access to school bus transportation. 272 students were officially enrolled in 2013–14. The staff is made up of 22 teachers, 4 teaching assistants, 2 counselors, 2 administrators, 1 secretary, 3 custodians, 3 cafeteria staff and 1 community coordinator. Currently, there is no librarian working there, due to Nova Scotia education cuts.

== Academics ==
Forest Heights is a grade 9-12 school and offers a variety of course options for students. Several math streams ranging from essentials to calculus are offered as well as several English streams. Art, Drama, Dance, Music, Child Studies, Production Technology, Science, Biology, Chemistry, Physics, Film and Video, Design, Sociology, Geography, History, Law, Political Science, French, and Physical Education are all offered.

Forest Heights also provides the Options and Opportunities program that give students co-op placements in the workplace while still earning class credit.

== Controversies ==
=== Discrimination Against Religious Expression ===
On May 3, 2012, the Board drew attention to itself in the Canadian media for allowing a student from Forest Heights Community School to be suspended by the school's principal for wearing a T-shirt that had the words, "Life is wasted without Jesus" on it, drawing criticism that it was discriminating against Christians and violating the boy's Charter rights to freedom of expression and religion. The T-shirt was an expression of the scriptural passage from the St. Paul's Letter to the Philippians 3:8, which says, "More than that, I even consider everything as a loss because of the supreme good of knowing Christ Jesus my Lord. For his sake I have accepted the loss of all things and I consider them so much rubbish, that I may gain Christ....".

On May 4, 2012, the South Shore Regional School Board decided to allow the boy to return to school on the following Monday and gave him permission to wear the shirt at school. They also hired a facilitator to deal with the issue; however, reports by CTV News indicated that the boy was not sure he wanted to return to school, feeling both discriminated against by administrators and bullied.

== Notable faculty ==
Judy Streatch is the former Member of the Legislative Assembly (MLA) for the riding of Chester-St. Margaret's. Judy was a teacher at Forest Heights Community School until June 21, 2005, when she took a permanent leave of absence when she won a by-election for a seat vacated by the late John Chataway.

Patricia Arab is the current member of the Legislative Assembly (MLA) for the riding of Fairview-Clayton Park. Arab was a member of the Forest Heights Community School faculty until her election.

Former Principal Joe Feeney is the current mayor for the town of Mahone Bay, Nova Scotia.
