= CKOH-FM =

Community radio station in Happy Valley-Goose Bay, Newfoundland and Labrador, Canada

Coordinates: 53°18′59″N 60°17′13″W

- Happy Valley-Goose Bay, Newfoundland and Labrador; Canada
- Frequency: 99.3 MHz

Programming
- Format: Indigenous community radio

Ownership
- Owner: Okalakatiget Society

History
- Former call signs: CKHV
- Former frequencies: 1340 kHz

Technical information
- Class: C
- ERP: 1,000 watts

Links
- Webcast: Okalakatiget Society Live Web Stream [Local Programming Only]
- Website: www.oksociety.com

CKOH-FM is a Canadian radio station, broadcasting at 99.3 FM in Happy Valley-Goose Bay, Newfoundland and Labrador. Owned by the Okalakatiget Society, the station broadcasts a community radio format for the region's First Nations and Inuit communities.

CKHV also has a Class A re-broadcaster in Nain, operating on 99.9 FM with the call sign CKOK-FM. CKOK was first used by CKOK, Penticton, British Columbia, now known as CKOR.

As of the end of 2014, the station now streams online. The stream is live during local programming only. At other times, the stream is not available.

In January 2016, the OKalaKatiget Society applied to convert CKHV to 99.3 FM. Power will be 1,710 watts (average and maximum ERP). Antenna height will be 187 metres (614') (EHAAT). The station will simulcast programming from CKOK 99.9 in Nain. Call letters will be CKOH-FM. This application was approved by the CRTC on June 1, 2016.
