= New Germany Rural High School =

Coordinates: 44.540173°N 64.720837°W

Location
- 44 School Street; New Germany, Nova Scotia, B0R 1E0; Canada

Information
- School type: High school
- Motto: Carpe Diem (Seize the day)
- Religious affiliation: Secular
- Founded: 1965 - Present
- School board: South Shore Regional Center for Education
- Principal: Calvin Regan
- Grades: 7-12
- Language: English
- Colours: Blue and gold
- Mascot: Bernie The Saint Bernard
- Team name: Saints
- Website: ngrhs.ednet.ns.ca
- Last updated: September 2025

New Germany Rural High School is a high school in Lunenburg County, Nova Scotia, Canada. It is administered by the South Shore Regional Centre for Education.
