= Park View Education Centre =

School in Nova Scotia, Canada

- Park View Education Centre’s coat of arms

Location
- 1485 King Street; Bridgewater, Nova Scotia, B4V 1C4; Canada
- Coordinates: 44°23′53″N 64°32′38.1″W

Information
- School type: High school
- Motto: Proud to serve students from anywhere in the world
- Established: 1968
- School board: South Shore Regional Centre for Education
- Principal: Vicki Crozier
- Grades: 10-12
- Enrollment: approx. 1000
- Language: English French immersion
- Colors: Black and Orange
- Mascot: Panther
- Team name: Park View Panthers
- Website: www.pvec.ednet.ns.ca
- Last updated: July 25, 2025

Park View Education Centre is a Canadian public secondary school located in the town of Bridgewater, Nova Scotia. It is operated by the South Shore Regional School Board (SSRSB).
