= Compact Camera Port 2 =

Compact Camera Port 2 (CCP2) is an electrical and data interface standard for cameras used in Mobile phones. It uses high speed differential serial signaling, and is defined by the Standard Mobile Imaging Architecture (SMIA) group.

== Classes ==
CCP2 supports several different speed classes:

Class	Speed
0	208 Mbit/s
1	416 Mbit/s
2	650 Mbit/s
