= Bayview Community School =

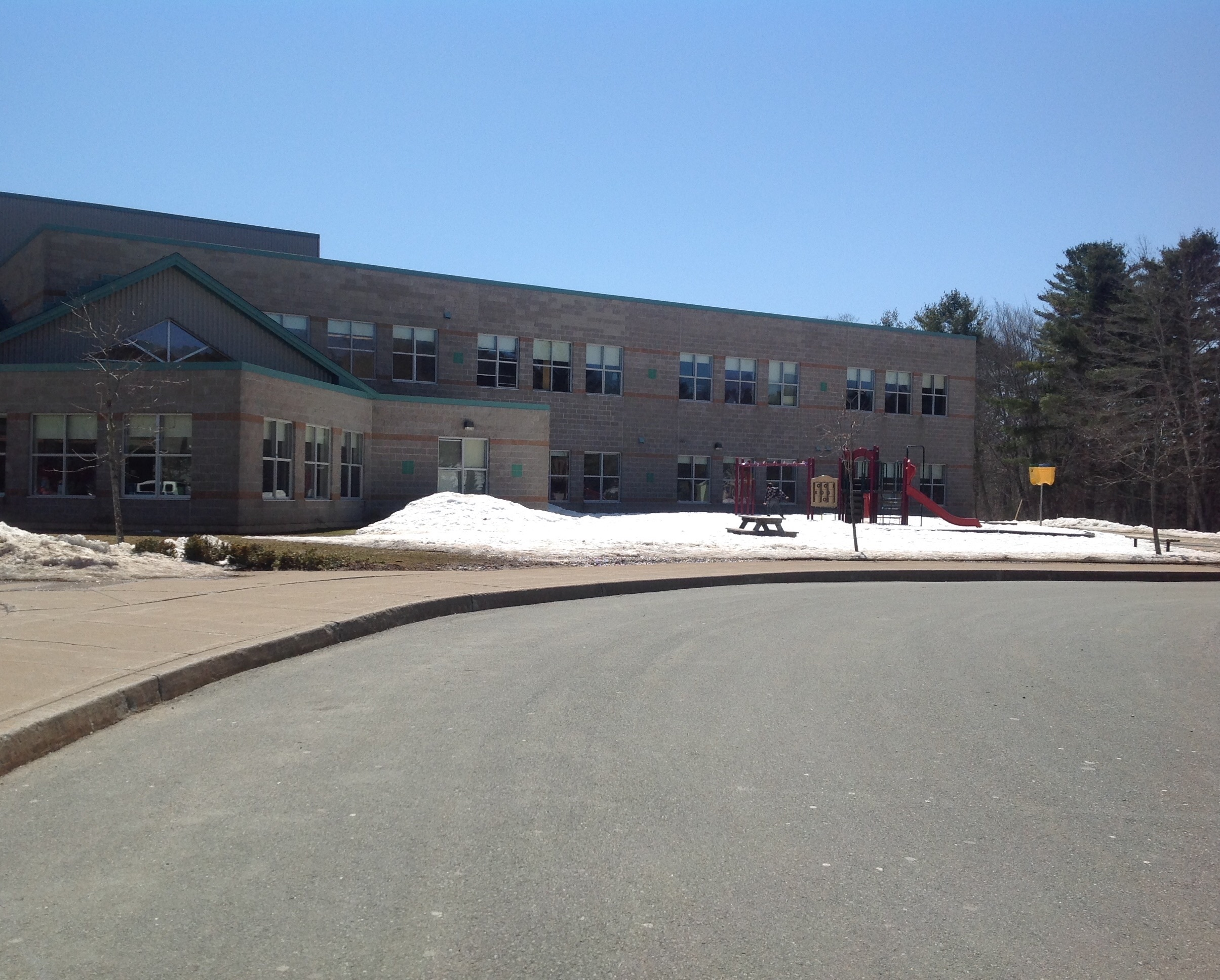

Location
- 110 Clearway Street; Mahone Bay, Nova Scotia, B0J 2EO; Canada
- Coordinates: 44°27′13.5″N 64°23′7.5″W

Information
- School type: Elementary to Junior High
- Motto: We are only defeated when we give up.
- Founded: 2000
- School board: South Shore Regional School Board
- Superintendent: Scott Milner
- School number: 191
- Principal: Lamar Eason
- Grades: P-9
- Enrollment: 401 (September 2013)
- Language: English
- Colors: Navy and Silver
- Mascot: Bobcats
- Team name: Bayview Bobcats
- Website: www.bayviewcommunity.ednet.ns.ca
- Last updated: December 3, 2018

Bayview Community School is located in Mahone Bay, Nova Scotia. It was built on a reclaimed marsh in September, 2000.

There are 430 students currently enrolled in the school from primary (or kindergarten) to grade 9. The principal is Lamar Eason, who was previously the vice principal of the Mahone Bay school.

== Achievements ==
Bayview Community School has won the following regional championships.

- 2001-2002 Junior Girls Basketball Champions
- 2002-2003 Junior Girls Basketball Champions
- 2004-2005 Junior Girls Basketball Champions
- 2007-2008 Junior Boys Champion Soccer, Junior Champions Badminton, Junior Boys Softball Champions
- 2009-2010 Junior Champions Badminton, Junior Girls Cross Country Champions, Junior Boys Basketball Champions
- 2010-2011 Junior Boys Soccer Champions, Junior Boys Cross Country Champions, Junior Boys Basketball Champions, Junior Girls Track and Field Champions, Junior Girls Volleyball Champions, Junior Boys Volleyball
- 2014-2015 Girls Wrestling Regional Champions
