= Liverpool Regional High School =

Coordinates: 44.032722°N 64.706019°W

Location
- P.O. Box 1266; Liverpool, Nova Scotia; Canada

Information
- Type: Senior High School
- Principal: Todd Symes
- Grades: 9-12
- Enrollment: 350
- Colors: Red and Black
- Mascot: Warriors
- Nickname: LRHS
- Website: lrhs.ednet.ns.ca

Liverpool Regional High School (LRHS) is a secondary school located in Liverpool, Nova Scotia, Canada. LRHS is part of the South Shore Regional School Board and is the only high school in the town of Liverpool.

== Sports Teams ==
Liverpool Regional High School has tons of sports teams. As of the school year of 2024-25, they have sports teams consisting of: Baseball, Boys' and Girls' Basketball, Cheerleading(Under the name "Cheer"), Cross country running, Curling, Golf, Soccer, Snowboarding, Softball, Table tennis, Track and field, and finally, Volleyball.
