= Hopedale Airport =

Airport in Newfoundland and Labrador, Canada

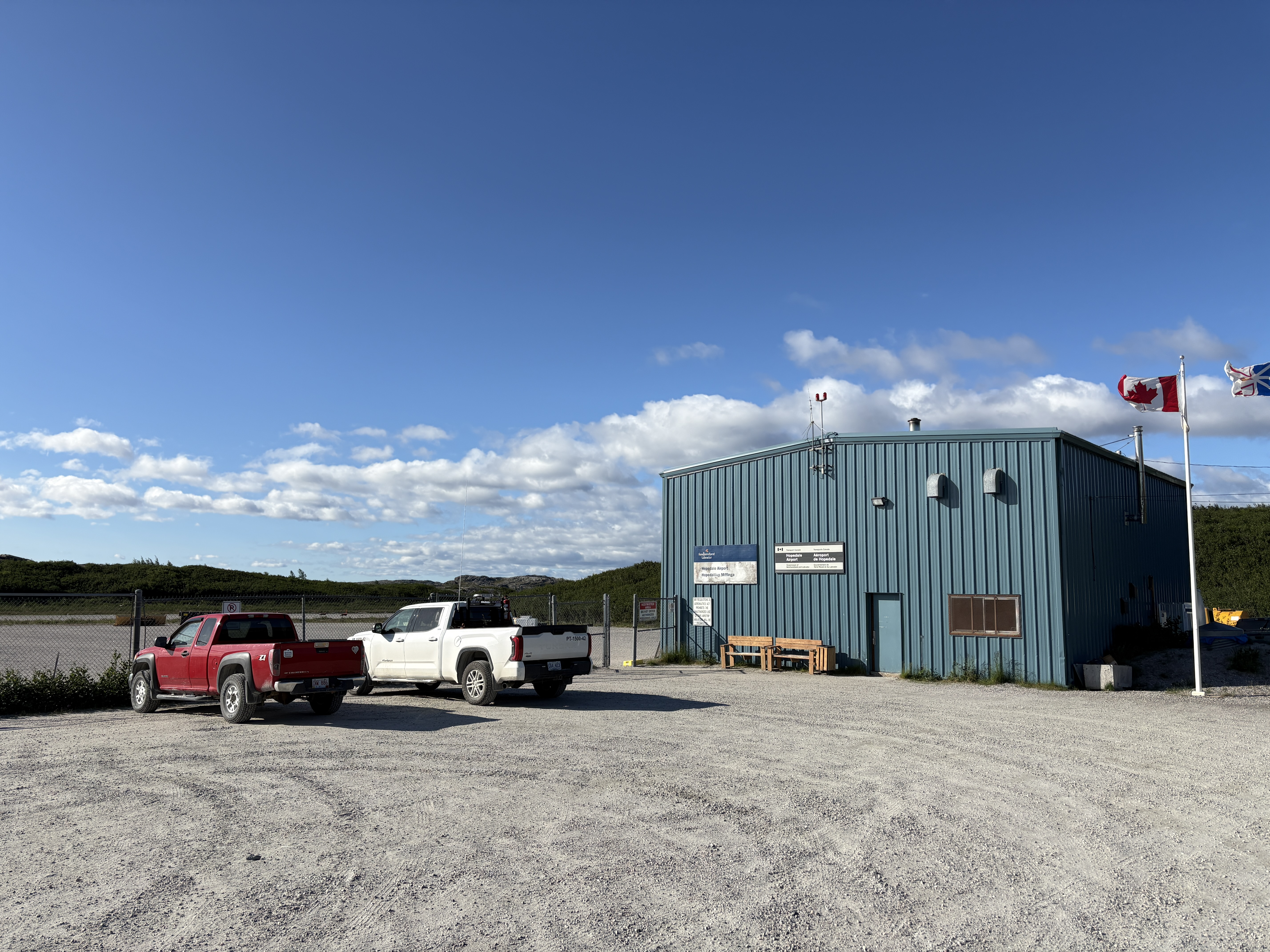
- IATA: YHO; ICAO: CYHO; WMO: 71900

Summary
- Airport type: Public
- Operator: Government of Newfoundland and Labrador
- Location: Hopedale, Newfoundland and Labrador
- Time zone: AST (UTC−04:00)
  - Summer (DST): ADT (UTC−03:00)
- Elevation AMSL: 46 ft (14 m)
- Coordinates: 55°26′56″N 060°13′41″W

Map
- Location in Newfoundland and Labrador

Runways
Direction	Length		Surface
Direction	ft	m	Surface
07/25	2,501	762	Gravel
- Source: Canada Flight Supplement

Hopedale Airport (IATA: YHO, ICAO: CYHO) is 1 nautical mile (1.9 km; 1.2 mi) west of Hopedale, Newfoundland and Labrador, Canada.

The airport was built in the 1960s to provide air support for Hopedale Air Station, a USAF station. After the US military left in 1968, the airport became a civilian airfield.

== Facilities ==
A large pre-fabricated building acts as a terminal building, but there are no other structures and the airfield.

Fuel cans litter the airfield and snow plow blades are stored outside on the tarmac.

There is no FBO at the airfield, thus no fuel available for aircraft landing at the airport. There is no control tower at the airport, so radio communication is made with Halifax Radio (flight service station) and ATC is supported by Gander Centre.

== Airlines and destinations ==
Airlines	Destinations
Air Borealis	Natuashish, Nain, Makkovik, Postville, Rigolet, Goose Bay

All commercial flights out of Hopedale Airport are operated by de Havilland DHC-6 Twin Otter 19-seat aircraft.
