= Makkovik Airport =

Airport in Newfoundland and Labrador, Canada

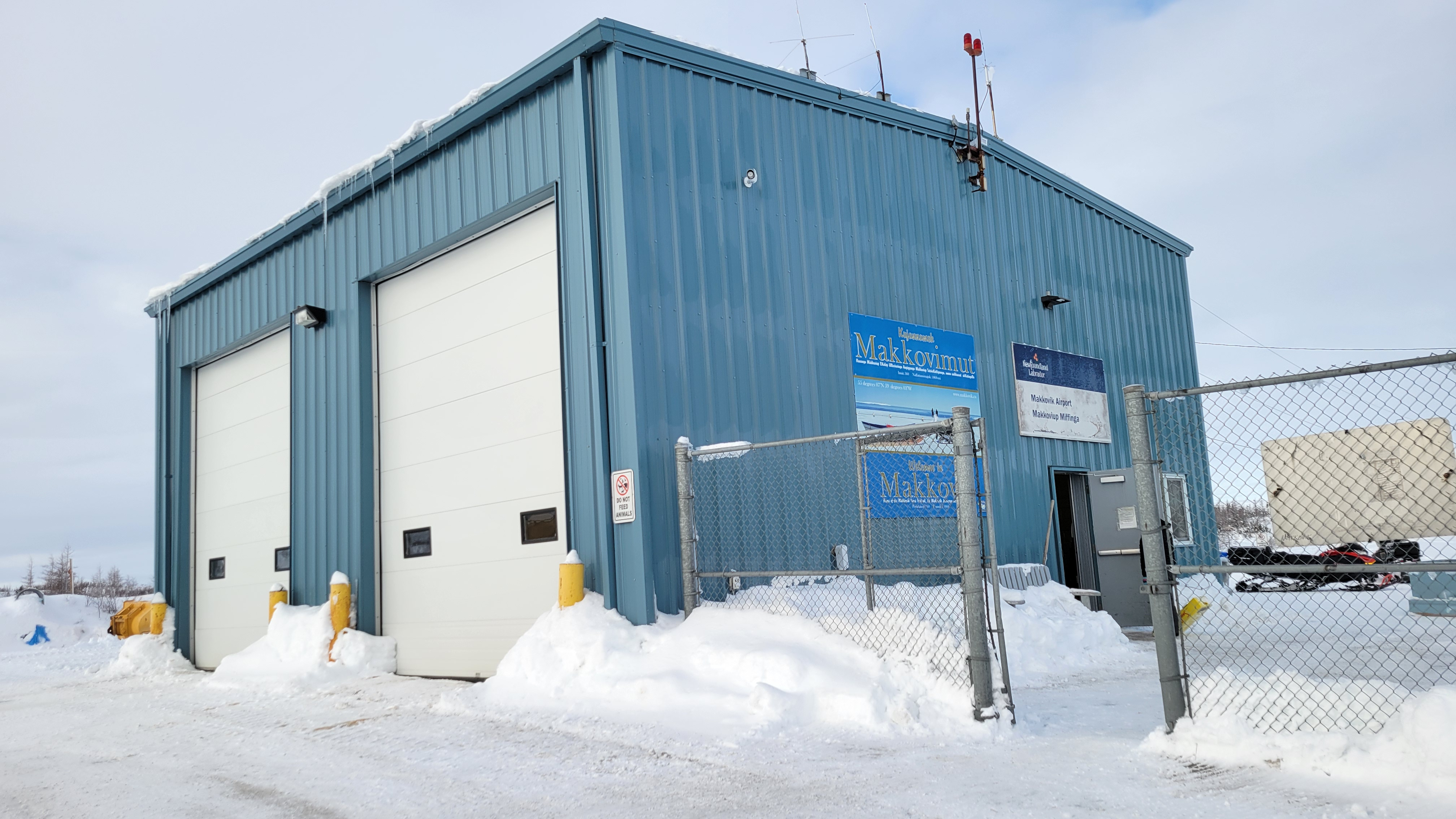
- IATA: YMN; ICAO: CYFT; WMO: 71596

Summary
- Airport type: Public
- Operator: Government of Newfoundland and Labrador
- Location: Makkovik, Newfoundland and Labrador
- Time zone: AST (UTC−04:00)
  - Summer (DST): ADT (UTC−03:00)
- Elevation AMSL: 231 ft / 70 m
- Coordinates: 55°04′36″N 059°11′11″W

Map
- Location in Newfoundland and Labrador

Runways
Direction	Length		Surface
Direction	ft	m	Surface
09/27	2,592	790	Gravel
- Sources: Canada Flight Supplement; Environment and Climate Change Canada

Makkovik Airport (IATA: YMN, ICAO: CYFT) is 0.5 nautical miles (0.93 km; 0.58 mi) west of Makkovik, Newfoundland and Labrador, Canada.

== Airlines and destinations ==
Airlines	Destinations
Air Borealis	Goose Bay, Hopedale, Nain, Natuashish, Postville, Rigolet
