= Rigolet Airport =

Airport in Newfoundland and Labrador, Canada

- IATA: YRG; ICAO: none; TC LID: CCZ2

Summary
- Airport type: Public
- Operator: Government of Newfoundland and Labrador
- Location: Rigolet, Newfoundland and Labrador
- Time zone: AST (UTC−04:00)
  - Summer (DST): ADT (UTC−03:00)
- Elevation AMSL: 186 ft / 57 m
- Coordinates: 54°10′46″N 058°27′26″W

Map
- Location in Newfoundland and Labrador

Runways
Direction	Length		Surface
Direction	ft	m	Surface
11/29	2,496	761	Gravel
- Source: Canada Flight Supplement

Rigolet Airport (IATA: YRG, TC LID: CCZ2) is located adjacent to Rigolet, Newfoundland and Labrador, Canada.

== Airlines and destinations ==
Airlines	Destinations
Air Borealis	Goose Bay, Hopedale, Makkovik, Nain, Natuashish, Postville
