= Nain Airport =

Airport in Newfoundland and Labrador, Canada

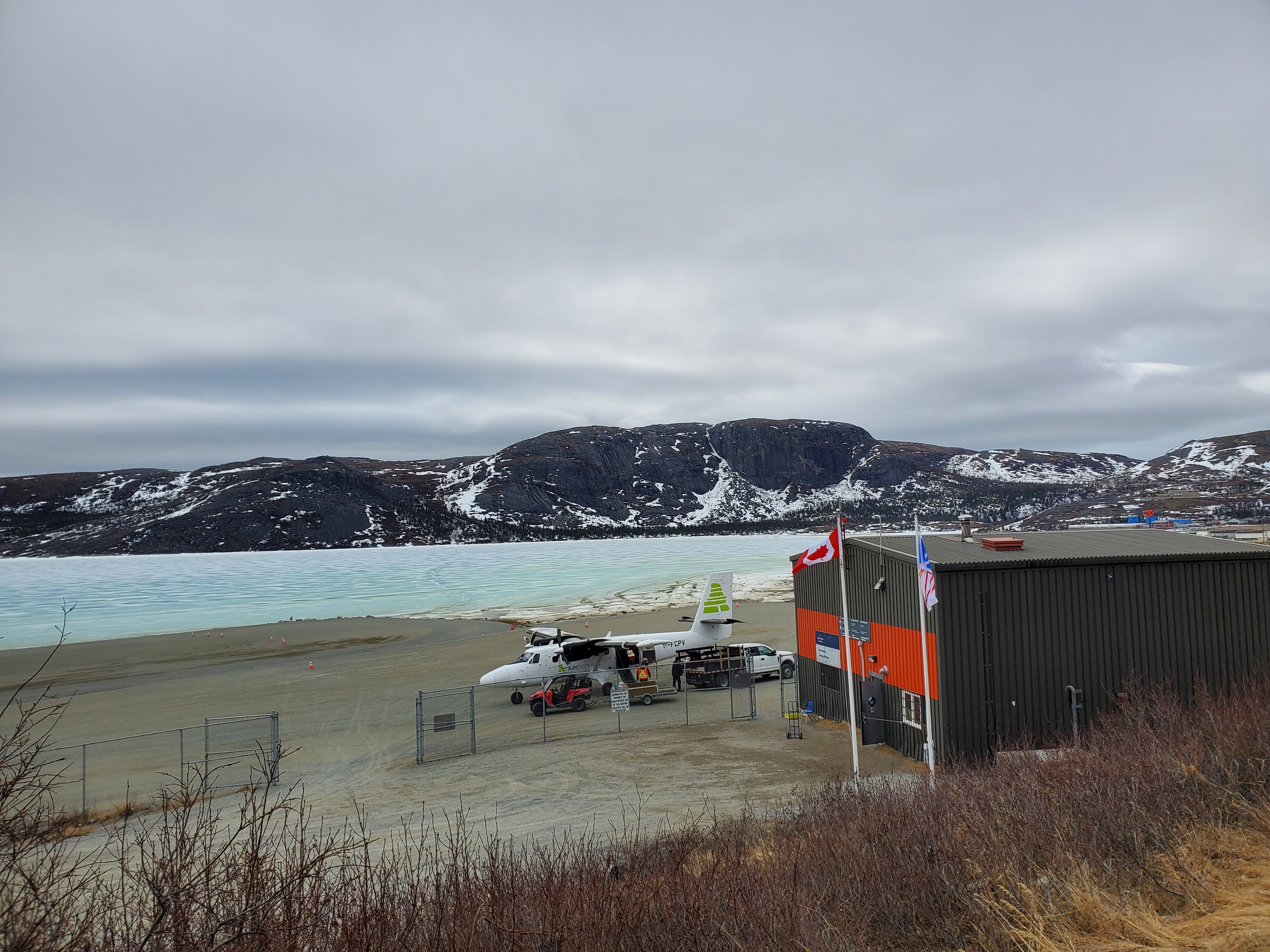
- IATA: YDP; ICAO: CYDP; WMO: 71902

Summary
- Airport type: Public
- Operator: Government of Newfoundland and Labrador
- Location: Nain, Newfoundland and Labrador
- Time zone: AST (UTC−04:00)
  - Summer (DST): ADT (UTC−03:00)
- Elevation AMSL: 21 ft / 6 m
- Coordinates: 56°33′02″N 061°40′56″W

Map
- Location in Newfoundland and Labrador

Runways
Direction	Length		Surface
Direction	ft	m	Surface
04/22	1,986	605	Gravel
- Sources: Canada Flight Supplement; Environment Canada

Nain Airport (IATA: YDP, ICAO: CYDP) is located on the shore of Unity Bay near Nain, Newfoundland and Labrador, Canada.

== Replacement ==
A study was completed in 2007 to identify alternate sites for the Nain Airstrip. Two potential sites met the attributes for a more detailed analysis.

In October 2018, the Nunatsiavut Government commissioned OCTANT Aviation Inc. to update an earlier study for this airstrip. The study concluded that the current airstrip’s location prohibits required upgrades to enable 24 hour operations and permit larger aircraft. A new airstrip would have to be located outside the community and would require the construction of a new airstrip access road.

In 2020, the Nunatsiavut government partnering with the Atlantic Canada Opportunities Agency (ACOA) funded a pre-feasibility study which determined the current airstrip was unsuitable for upgrades, but identified a potential site to develop about seven kilometres southwest of Nain.

Currently, the Nunatsiavut government is attempting to secure funding for a full feasibility study.

== Airlines and destinations ==
Airlines	Destinations
Air Borealis	Goose Bay, Hopedale, Makkovik, Natuashish, Postville, Rigolet

Flights are operated by PAL Airlines subsidiary, Air Borealis.

Direct flights to Goose Bay and Natuashish. Flights to other destinations are flown via Natuashish - Onwards to Hopedale, Postville, Makkovik and Rigolet and Goose Bay.
