= William's Harbour =

Settlement in Newfoundland and Labrador, Canada

Coordinates: 52.332°N 56.004°W

Location of William's Harbour in Newfoundland and Labrador

William's Harbour is a former local service district and designated place in the Canadian province of Newfoundland and Labrador. The community was entirely resettled in 2017. The settlement was part of the NunatuKavut territory.

== History ==
A fishing community, William's Harbour went into decline following the 1992 cod moratorium with the closure of its fish plant in 1992. The local school closed in 2000.

In a March 28, 2013 interview on CBC Radio's As It Happens programme, area administrator George Russell stated that the 17 remaining residents of William's Harbour were willing to accept a new re-settlement offer of $275,000.00 per household from the government of Newfoundland and Labrador to residents of struggling outport communities.

On August 15, 2017, the CBC reported that the residents of William's Harbour had agreed to relocate. The entire community was in agreement with the decision to move. The cost was approximately $4 million (Canadian) to complete the relocation. The government expects to save about $7.9 million Canadian dollars over the next two decades. Residents will be able to return for berry picking or fishing by applying for a five-year permit after they have relocated to a new community. On November 10, 2017 the last residents left William's Harbour.

As a designated place in the 2021 Census of Population conducted by Statistics Canada, William's Harbour recorded a population of 0 down from 15 in the 2016 census.

== Geography ==
William's Harbour is in Labrador within Subdivision B of Division No. 10.

== See also ==
- List of designated places in Newfoundland and Labrador
- NunatuKavut
- Resettlement (Newfoundland)
- Todd Russell
