= St. Anthony Airport =

- IATA: YAY; ICAO: CYAY

Summary
- Airport type: Public
- Operator: Transport Canada
- Location: St. Anthony, Newfoundland and Labrador
- Time zone: NST (UTC−03:30)
  - Summer (DST): NDT (UTC−02:30)
- Elevation AMSL: 108 ft / 33 m
- Coordinates: 51°23′31″N 056°04′59″W

Map
- Location in Newfoundland and Labrador

Runways
Direction	Length		Surface
Direction	ft	m	Surface
10/28	4,003	1,220	Asphalt

Statistics (2010)
- Aircraft movements: 4,239
- Sources: Canada Flight Supplement; Statistics from Transport Canada.

St. Anthony Airport (IATA: YAY, ICAO: CYAY) is located 19 nautical miles (35 km; 22 mi) west northwest of St. Anthony, Newfoundland and Labrador, Canada.

== Airlines and destinations ==
Airlines	Destinations
PAL Airlines	Blanc-Sablon, Goose Bay, St. John's, Wabush
