= Natuashish Airport =

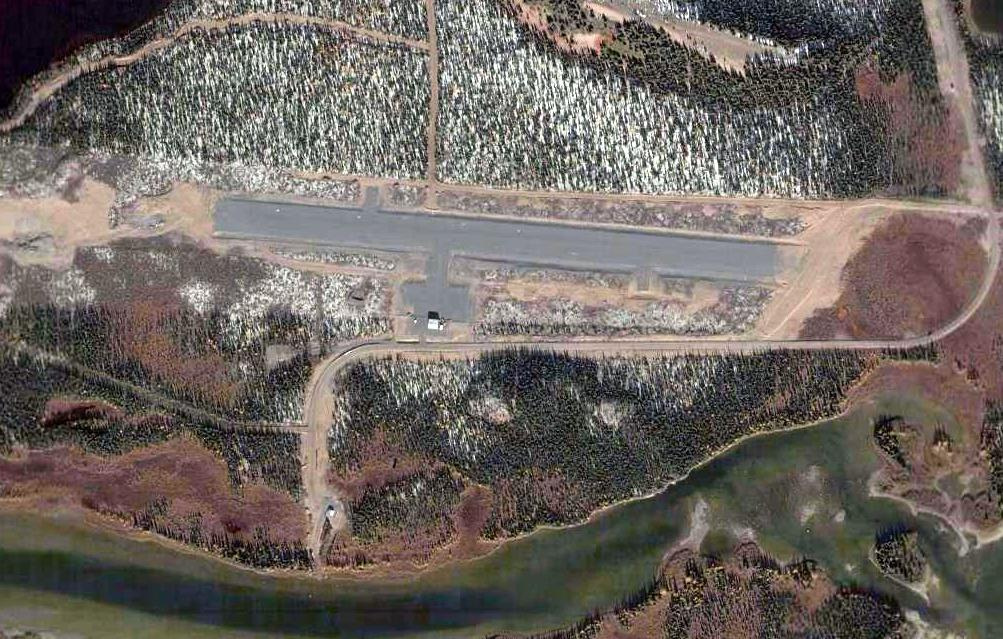
- IATA: YNP; ICAO: none; TC LID: CNH2

Summary
- Airport type: Public
- Operator: Government of Newfoundland and Labrador
- Location: Natuashish, Newfoundland and Labrador
- Time zone: AST (UTC−04:00)
  - Summer (DST): ADT (UTC−03:00)
- Elevation AMSL: 33 ft / 10 m
- Coordinates: 55°54′50″N 061°11′04″W

Map
- Location in Newfoundland and Labrador

Runways
Direction	Length		Surface
Direction	ft	m	Surface
12/30	2,500	762	Gravel
- Sources: Canada Flight Supplement

Natuashish Airport (IATA: YNP, TC LID: CNH2) is 1.6 nautical miles (3.0 km; 1.8 mi) west of Natuashish, Newfoundland and Labrador, Canada.

== Airlines and destinations ==
Airlines	Destinations
Air Borealis	Goose Bay, Hopedale, Makkovik, Nain, Postville, Rigolet
