= New Germany, Nova Scotia =

Community in Nova Scotia, Canada

Coordinates: 44.550°N 64.717°W

New Germany in Nova Scotia

New Germany is a community in the Canadian province of Nova Scotia, located in Lunenburg County. Located along the LaHave River and New Germany Lake, it is a main service centre connecting Bridgewater and Middleton via highway Trunk 10. New Germany is situated 25 kilometres north of Bridgewater and 64 kilometres south of Middleton Annapolis Valley. It has a population of 447 as of the 2021 census.

== History ==
The original inhabitants of the New Germany area were the Mi'kmaq people. Several Mi'kmaq families, including the Beeler, Jeremy and Soulnow families, lived in the area for generations prior to the arrival of the European settlers.

The first European settler to arrive was John Feindel around the year 1803, soon followed by Varner, Penney, and Woodworth families all descendants of the Foreign Protestants who arrived in Lunenburg in the 18th century. The first settlement was along the New Germany Lake on the north side. The first recorded church service was in a barn owned by John Feindel in 1828. The early pioneers in New Germany learned many skills from the Mi'kmaq inhabitants such as hunting, fishing, and tea-making. The European settlers sought to create farms around the area's arable soil, which resulted in several Mi'kmaq families being displaced from their land. In 1829, a petition was written to the governor by Joseph Soulnow, a Mi'kmaw man, asking for his inherited land to be returned to him.

Throughout the years, New Germany has been the site of varied economic activity. The first major industrial project was in 1811 when area founder John Feindel built a small sawmill at Morgan's Falls. Near 1898 Edward Zwicker Senior built a new sawmill and fish box factory and later sold electric power to the community under the name Barss Corner Electric Light Company. There was also a water wheel driven Pulp Mill at Morgan Falls on east end of the village which operated until 1958. During the mid-20th century, the town was particularly vibrant and home to numerous grocery stores, clothing stores, a hotel, and the York Movie Theatre. During World War Two the village showed its hatred of the Nazi regime by burning an effigy of Hitler on Tower Hill. Many men of the area worked either directly or indirectly for the Bowater Sawmill outside Bridgewater or the larger Bowater Pulp and Paper Mill near Liverpool. With the construction of the new Michelin Tire Factory in Bridgewater near 1971, New Germany continued to grow with many new families moving to the area. Until 1981, New Germany was also accessible by the Halifax and Southwestern Railway, though the now-abandoned railroad tracks are popular with all-terrain vehicle enthusiasts and as a walking path.

== Present day ==
Local employment hinges on natural resources such as farming, blueberries, maple syrup, forestry and Christmas trees, which are shipped over North America. Many workers are employed in the nearby town of Bridgewater, with the Michelin tire plant in the industrial park employing numerous people from the area. Current conditions in the forestry industry have led to many small operators leaving the business and journeying to Alberta.

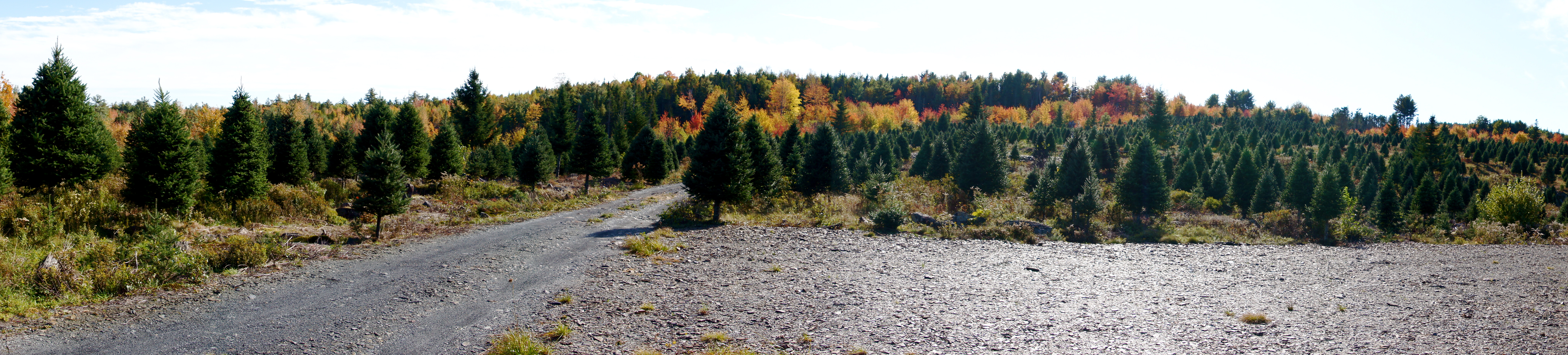
A Christmas tree farm near New Germany, Nova Scotia.

During the COVID-19 pandemic in Canada, sales of houses and land in New Germany rose with people looking for homes along lakes and rivers. New Germany is surrounded by lakes, rivers, tributaries, and brooks, making the area more desirable for outdoorsmen. New Germany was connected with Fibre Optic Internet in 2020 and has great coverage from Starlink Satellite Internet. The community holds a regular Farmers Market on Friday afternoon from June to October and a Community Cafe on Thursday mornings to encourage fellowship. New Germany Lake is a registered landing strip for floatplanes.

New Germany is home to a community-built medical centre, New Germany Elementary School, New Germany Rural High School, bank, convenience store, Post Office, several churches, shops and restaurants. It has a fairly large volunteer fire department, which covers an extensive district, as well as an RCMP outpost which is housed in the same building as the fire department. In 2021, a new bridge is being built across the Lahave river so the South Shore Annapolis Valley Trail can connect to the former Caledonia rail line expanding recreational activities for walkers, cyclists, and ATV users.

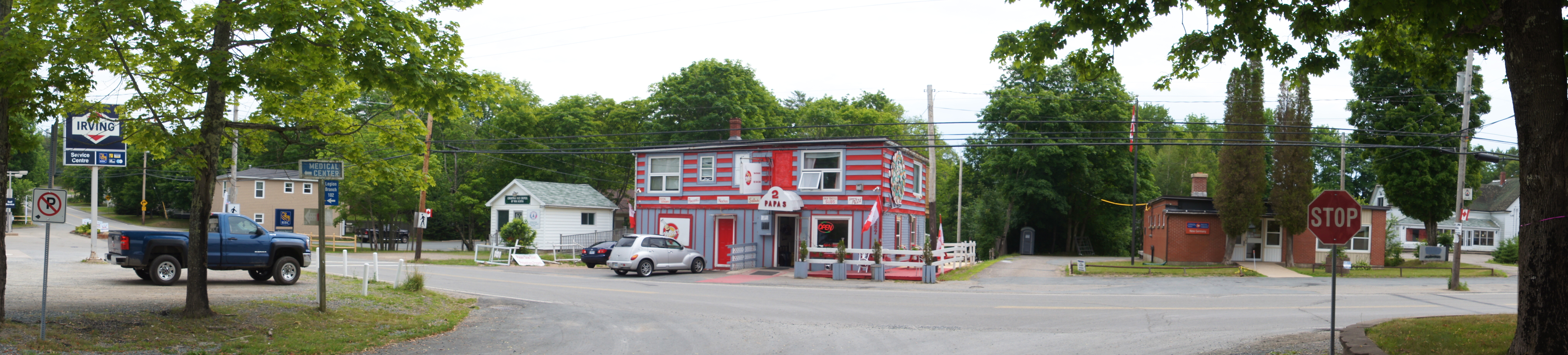
A few of the services available in New Germany, Nova Scotia, Canada.

== Demographics ==
In the 2021 Census of Population conducted by Statistics Canada, New Germany had a population of 447 living in 213 of its 230 total private dwellings, a change of −2.4% from its 2016 population of 458. With a land area of 2.49 km^{2} (0.96 sq mi), it had a population density of 179.5/km^{2} (464.9/sq mi) in 2021.

== Education ==
New Germany Rural High School was built in 1964 and has since been modernized once. It serves students ranging from grades seven to twelve. New Germany Elementary School was built in 1954 as the High School, but it was converted to the Elementary School when the new High School was built. Both Schools are on School Street and contain very large outdoor playing fields. New Germany High School's mascot is Bernie the Saint Bernard Dog, school moto is Carpe Diem. Currently, plans are in the works to merge the schools into one large school that ranges from primary to grade twelve.
