= Postville Airport =

Airport in Newfoundland and Labrador, Canada

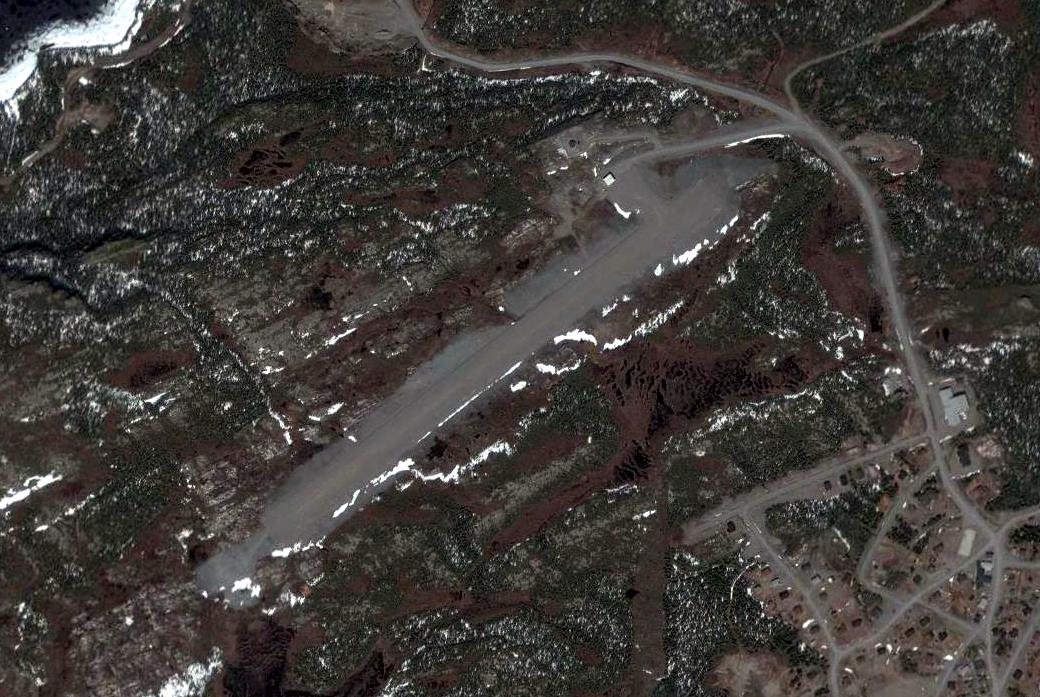
- IATA: YSO; ICAO: none; TC LID: CCD4

Summary
- Airport type: Public
- Operator: Government of Newfoundland and Labrador
- Location: Postville, Newfoundland and Labrador
- Time zone: AST (UTC−04:00)
  - Summer (DST): ADT (UTC−03:00)
- Elevation AMSL: 223 ft / 68 m
- Coordinates: 54°54′37″N 059°47′07″W

Map
- Location in Newfoundland and Labrador

Runways
Direction	Length		Surface
Direction	ft	m	Surface
05/23	2,576	785	Gravel
- Source: Canada Flight Supplement

Postville Airport (IATA: YSO, TC LID: CCD4) serves Postville, Newfoundland and Labrador, Canada.

== Facility layout ==
The airport has one gravel runway that is 2,576 ft × 75 ft (785 m × 23 m). In 2023 the Government of Newfoundland and Labrador announced it would be upgrading the airport and access road.

== Airlines and destinations ==
The PAL Airlines subsidiary Air Borealis operates flights to and from Postville.

Airlines	Destinations
Air Borealis	Goose Bay, Hopedale, Makkovik, Nain, Natuashish, Rigolet
