= List of airports in Nova Scotia =

Nova Scotia

This is a list of airports in Nova Scotia. It includes all Nav Canada certified and registered water and land airports, aerodromes and heliports in the Canadian province of Nova Scotia. Airport names in italics are part of the National Airports System.

== List of airports and heliports ==
Halifax Stanfield is classified as an international airport by Transport Canada.

The list is sorted by the name of the community served; click the sort buttons in the table header to switch listing order.

Community	Airport name	PU PR MI	AOE (Note: An airport of entry has four different categories. An AOE which can accept "all classes of scheduled and non-scheduled aircraft (passenger and cargo)." An AOE/# which can handle aircraft in the previous category but up to maximum number. This number can be exceeded if done in stages as shown in parentheses. An AOE/15 that can accept general aviation aircraft with a maximum of 15 passengers. An AOE/CAN which can handle aircraft subject to the CANPASS regulations.)	Operator	Elevation	ICAO	TC LID	IATA	Image	Coordinates
Antigonish	Antigonish (St. Martha's Regional Hospital) Heliport	PR		St. Martha's Regional Hospital	70 ft (21 m)		CDY5			45°37′36″N 61°58′55″W
Arichat	Arichat (St. Anne Ladies Auxiliary Hospital) Heliport	PR		St. Anne Ladies Auxiliary	70 ft (21 m)		CDT3			45°30′41″N 61°02′01″W
Baddeck	Baddeck (Guneden) Aerodrome	PR		Guneden Place	291 ft (89 m)		CDW2			46°09′51″N 60°47′30″W
Bridgewater	Bridgewater/Dayspring Airpark	PU		K. Bennett	150 ft (46 m)		CDY6			44°22′55″N 64°27′27″W
Bridgewater	Bridgewater (South Shore Regional Hospital) Heliport	PR		Nova Scotia Health Authority	100 ft (30 m)		CDT6			44°22′56″N 64°30′38″W
Canso	Canso (Eastern Memorial Hospital) Heliport	PR		Municipality of the District of Guysborough	19 ft (5.8 m)		CCE5			45°19′58″N 60°58′53″W
Carleton	Mink Lake Water Aerodrome	PU		Allister d'Entremont	70 ft (21 m)		CML3			44°00′39″N 65°53′20″W
Centredale	Centredale Aerodrome	PR		Mike Gourd	591 ft (180 m)		CDL8			45°24′34″N 62°37′07″W
Church Lake	Church Lake Water Aerodrome	PU		Christopher Ball	280 ft (85 m)		CHL3			44°33′34″N 64°36′44″W
Debert	Debert Airport (CFS Debert)	PU	CANPASS	Debert Flight Centre	136 ft (41 m)		CCQ3			45°25′07″N 63°27′38″W
Digby	Digby Municipal Airport	PU	CANPASS	Municipality of the District of Digby	499 ft (152 m)	CYID		YDG		44°32′44″N 65°47′20″W
Digby	Digby (General Hospital) Heliport	PR		Nova Scotia Health Authority	142 ft (43 m)		CDG2			44°36′57″N 65°45′43″W
East Gore	East Gore Eco Airpark	PR		Mike C Bloise	615 ft (187 m)		CCY4			45°07′00″N 63°42′00″W
Fall River	Fall River Water Aerodrome	PR		David Comeau	122 ft (37 m)		CFR3			44°47′04″N 63°38′30″W
Finlay	Finlay Air Park	PU		Finlay Air Park	145 ft (44 m)		CDH3			43°57′44″N 65°59′39″W
Fox Harbour	Fox Harbour Airport	PR	CANPASS	Fox Harbour Development	62 ft (19 m)		CFH4			45°52′12″N 63°27′40″W
Greenwood	CFB Greenwood (Greenwood Airport)	MI		DND	92 ft (28 m)	CYZX		YZX		44°59′03″N 64°55′03″W
Halifax	Halifax (IWK Health Centre) Heliport	PR		IWK Health Centre	223 ft (68 m)		CIW2			44°38′13″N 63°35′04″W
Halifax	Halifax (QE II Health Sciences Centre) Heliport	PR		Queen Elizabeth II Health Sciences Centre	260 ft (79 m)		CHQE			44°38′45″N 63°35′12″W
Halifax	Halifax (South End) Heliport	PR		Halifax Port Authority	13 ft (4.0 m)		CHS7			44°37′32″N 63°33′48″W
Halifax	Halifax Stanfield International Airport	PU	AOE	Halifax International Airport Authority	477 ft (145 m)	CYHZ		YHZ		44°52′51″N 63°30′31″W
Hillaton	Hillaton/Kings Aerodrome	PR		CHL2 Aviation	98 ft (30 m)		CHL2			45°08′34″N 64°25′22″W
Hoopers Lake	Hoopers Lake Water Aerodrome	PU		Hoopers Lake Repairs & Services	100 ft (30 m)		CDT2			43°57′14″N 65°59′27″W
Inverness	Inverness (Consolidated Memorial Hospital) Heliport	PR		Cape Breton District Health Authority	100 ft (30 m)		CNV2			46°11′58″N 61°17′29″W
Kentville	Kentville (Camp Aldershot) Heliport	MI		DND	100 ft (30 m)		CKM9			45°05′39″N 64°30′32″W
Kentville	Kentville (Valley Regional Hospital) Heliport	PR		Valley Regional Hospital	80 ft (24 m)		CKV8			45°04′54″N 64°30′00″W
Lake Doucette	Lake Doucette Water Aerodrome	PR		Mike A Gittens	39 ft (12 m)		CDU9			44°03′30″N 66°07′34″W
Liverpool	Liverpool (Queens General Hospital) Heliport	PR		Queens General Hospital	66 ft (20 m)		CLQ2			44°02′19″N 64°42′19″W
Liverpool	South Shore Regional Airport	PU		South Shore Flying Club	325 ft (99 m)	CYAU				44°13′49″N 64°51′22″W
Lower East Pubnico	Lower East Pubnico (La Field) Airport	PR		Ronald Belliveau	107 ft (33 m)		CLE4			43°37′20″N 65°45′44″W
Lower West Pubnico	Grand Etang Pubnico Water Aerodrome	PU		Brad d'Entremont	10 ft (3.0 m)		CGE2			43°37′43″N 65°48′49″W
Meteghan	Meteghan/Keizers Air Park	PR		Calvin Kelzer	134 ft (41 m)		CKZ5			44°10′21″N 66°09′45″W
Middleton	Middleton (Soldiers Memorial Hospital) Heliport	PR		Soldiers Memorial Hospital	70 ft (21 m)		CMS2			44°56′46″N 65°03′32″W
Musquodoboit Harbour (Paces Lake)	Musquodoboit Harbour/Paces Lake Water Aerodrome	PR		Les Boutilier	57 ft (17 m)		CPL5			44°49′13″N 63°12′50″W
Musquodoboit Harbour (Petpeswick Lake)	Musquodoboit Harbour/Petpeswick Lake Water Aerodrome	PR		David Grimes	49 ft (15 m)		CPL9			44°06′04″N 63°10′51″W
Musquodoboit Harbour (Scots Lake)	Musquodoboit Harbour/Scots Lake Water Aerodrome	PR		Don Whitton	46 ft (14 m)		CSL2			44°47′23″N 63°10′46″W
New Germany	New Germany Water Aerodrome	PR		Mervin E. Zinck	205 ft (62 m)		CCA2			44°33′08″N 64°44′11″W
New Glasgow	New Glasgow (Aberdeen Hospital) Heliport	PR		Aberdeen Hospital	77 ft (23 m)		CNG2			45°34′20″N 62°38′39″W
Porters Lake	Porters Lake Airport	PR		R. MacFarlane	20 ft (6.1 m)		CCF4			44°42′36″N 63°18′06″W
Porters Lake	Porters Lake Water Aerodrome	PR		R. MacFarlane	0 ft (0 m)		CDD2			44°42′44″N 63°17′56″W
Porters Lake	Porters Lake South Water Aerodrome	PR		John J. Neima	0 ft (0 m)		CLS4			44°39′56″N 63°18′53″W
Port Hawkesbury	Allan J. MacEachen Port Hawkesbury Airport (Port Hawkesbury Airport)	PU	15	Celtic Air Services	373 ft (114 m)	CYPD		YPS		45°39′24″N 61°22′05″W
Sable Island	Sable Island Aerodrome	PR		Parks Canada	4 ft (1.2 m)		CSB2			43°55′50″N 59°57′35″W
Sable Island	Sable Island Heliport	PR		Parks Canada	15 ft (4.6 m)		CST5			43°55′59″N 60°00′20″W
St. Peter's	St. Peter's/Cape George Water Aerodrome	PU		Michael Schinzig	0 ft (0 m)		CCG6			45°43′50″N 60°48′38″W
Shearwater	Shearwater Heliport (CFB Shearwater, Halifax/Shearwater Heliport)	MI		DND	144 ft (44 m)	CYAW		YAW		44°38′14″N 63°30′08″W
Shelburne	Shelburne (Roseway Hospital) Heliport	PR		Roseway Hospital	75 ft (23 m)		CCZ9			43°45′01″N 65°18′35″W
Shubenacadie	Shubenacadie Heliport	PR		Nova Scotia Department of Natural Resources and Renewables	80 ft (24 m)		CSU4			45°05′36″N 63°23′43″W
Stanley	Stanley Airport	PU		Stanley Sport Aviation	95 ft (29 m)		CCW4			45°06′02″N 63°55′14″W
Sydney	JA Douglas McCurdy Sydney Airport	PU	44 (200)	Sydney Airport Authority	203 ft (62 m)	CYQY		YQY		46°09′41″N 60°02′53″W
Sydney	Sydney (Cape Breton Regional Hospital) Heliport	PR		Cape Breton Regional Hospital	204 ft (62 m)		CSY9			46°06′36″N 60°10′34″W
Thorburn	Thorburn Airport	PU		Scotia Pine	120 ft (37 m)		CCZ5			45°33′38″N 62°35′41″W
Trenton	Trenton Aerodrome	PU	CANPASS	Trenton Airport Limited	319 ft (97 m)	CYTN				45°36′43″N 62°37′16″W
Truro	Truro (Colchester Health Centre) Heliport	PR		Colchester East Hants Health Centre	140 ft (43 m)		CEH9			45°20′59″N 63°18′20″W
Yarmouth	Doctor's Lake East Water Aerodrome	PU		Richard Hurlburt	10 ft (3.0 m)		CDL5			43°52′54″N 66°05′51″W
Yarmouth	Doctor's Lake West Water Aerodrome	PR		David Arenburg	10 ft (3.0 m)		CDL6			43°53′04″N 66°06′09″W
Yarmouth	Yarmouth Airport	PU	110 (225)	Yarmouth Airport Commission	140 ft (43 m)	CYQI		YQI		43°49′38″N 66°05′18″W
Yarmouth	Yarmouth (Regional Hospital) Heliport	PR		Yarmouth Regional Hospital	43 ft (13 m)		CDU3			43°50′54″N 66°07′17″W

== Defunct airports ==
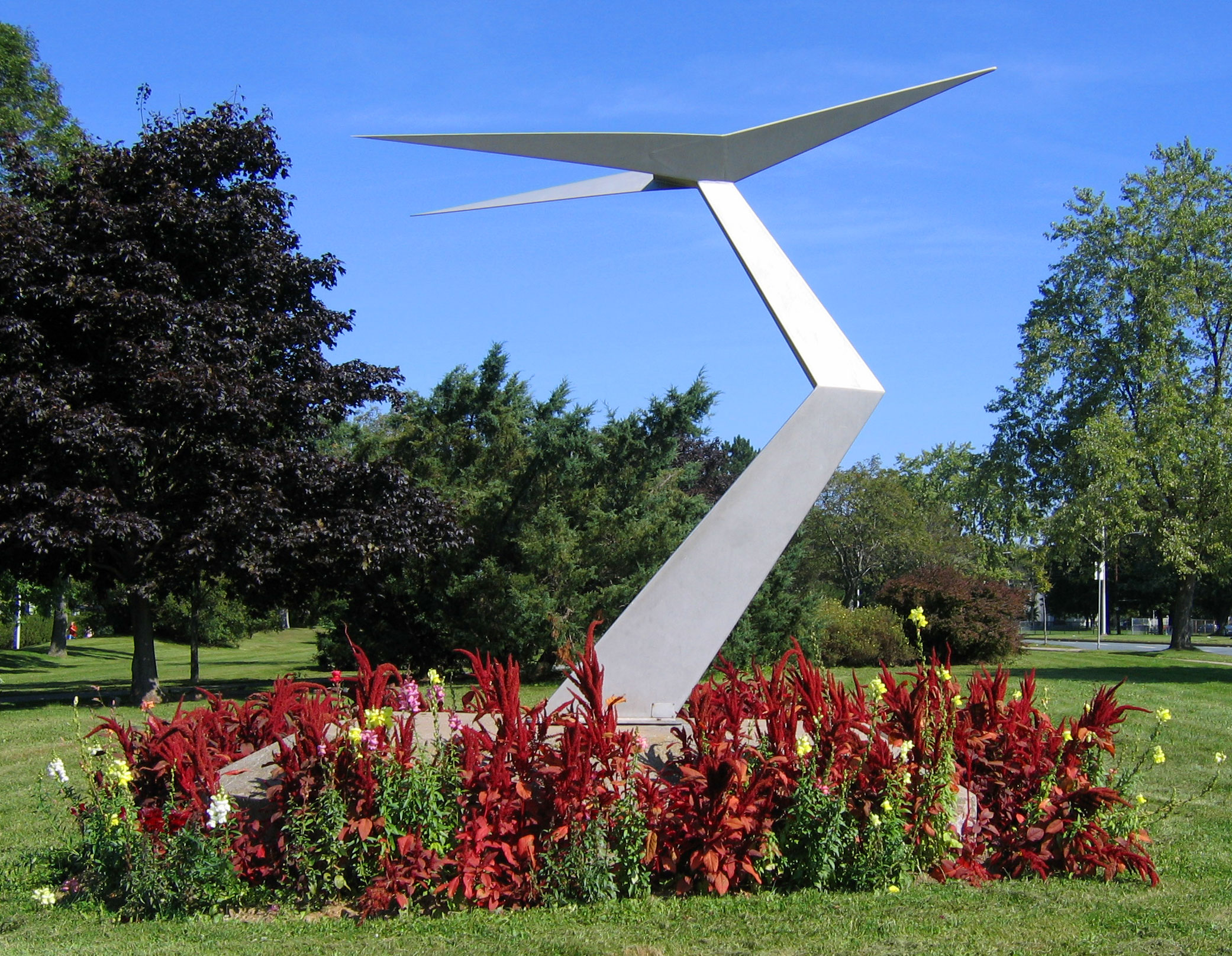
Memorial at Saunders Park, formerly the Halifax Civic Airport, to commemorate the life work of a pioneer in Canadian aviation, Wing Commander Donald W. Saunders

Community	Airport name	ICAO	TC LID	IATA	Coordinates
Amherst	Amherst Airport		CCQ4		45°48′49″N 064°14′09″W
Apple River	Apple River Airport		CCA7		45°27′43″N 064°49′17″W
Fancy Lake	Fancy Lake Water Aerodrome		CDX4		44°18′00″N 064°33′00″W
Langille Lake	Langille Lake Water Aerodrome		CLL2		44°27′00″N 064°26′52″W
Margaree Valley	Margaree Airport		CCZ4		46°20′28″N 60°58′47″W
Stewiacke River	Middle Stewiacke Airport		CCB2		45°13′17″N 063°08′55″W
Tatamagouche	Tatamagouche Airport		CDA2		45°44′08″N 063°19′06″W
Valley	Valley Airport		CDA3		45°23′48″N 063°12′56″W
Waterville	Waterville/Kings County Municipal Airport		CCW3		45°05′23″N 064°39′06″W
Waverley	Waverley/Lake William Water Aerodrome		CLW3		44°46′51″N 063°35′48″W
West End, Halifax	Halifax Civic Airport				44°38′45″N 063°36′40″W
