= Aéroports de Montréal =

Main airport authority in the Greater Montreal Area

ADM Aéroports de Montréal
- Type: Nonprofit organization
- Industry: Airport
- Founded: 1992
- Headquarters: Pierre Elliott Trudeau International Airport, Dorval, Quebec, Canada
- Key people: Yves Beauchamp, CEO
- Products: Airport
- Number of employees: 600
- Website: admtl.com/en/ADM

ADM Aéroports de Montréal, often abbreviated ADM, is the main airport authority in the Greater Montreal area. It is headquartered in Suite 1000 of the Leigh-Capreol Place in Dorval, Quebec. It is responsible for both Montréal–Trudeau International Airport and Montréal–Mirabel International Airport. It is a non-profit private enterprise that neither issues share capital nor receive government funding. Its missions are to provide quality airport service for the Montréal region, support its economic development, and develop a harmonious coexistence with the surrounding environment.

== History ==
Dorval Airport and Mirabel Airport were built and operated by the government of Canada until 1992.

In 1987 the federal government developed a national policy to give the operation and maintenance of all major airports to the private sector. The airports remained property of the government. In 1992 Aéroport de Montréal was created to maintain and operate Dorval Airport and Mirabel Airport.

At its inception, the ADM faced many challenges, mainly maintaining two underused airports with similar mission serving one city. In 1995, ADM announced that it would invest in order to modernize the aging Dorval Airport and improve the Mirabel Airport. At that time the passenger traffic was split between the two airports; intercontinental flight flying from Mirabel and local flight from Dorval. In 1997, in order to simplify connecting flight, Dorval was chosen to receive all scheduled passenger flights. Mirabel was to remain operational but with limited traffic. Cargo and charter flight were to fly from Mirabel.

From 2002 and 2006, ADM invested $716 million in the Dorval Airport. ADM added several new features to the airport, including a new international jetty and a new arrival complex. In 2004, ADM further consolidated the passenger traffic by moving all charter flights from Mirabel to Dorval. Since then Mirabel only operates cargo flight, aircraft construction and maintenance. In 2004, the Canadian government renamed Dorval Airport to Pierre Elliott Trudeau International Airport.

== Current projects ==
ADM development of the Montréal's airports is not over and still in the process of improving Pierre Elliott Trudeau International Airport. A project to connect Pierre Elliott Trudeau International Airport to Montréal downtown via express-trains is currently in development and was given a priority status. ADM is also financing the Aérogalerie program, which aims to gives the airports a Montréal character and to support local artists by displaying Montréal artistic creations in the airport.

== See also ==
- Edmonton Airports
- Greater Toronto Airports Authority
- Halifax International Airport Authority
- Regina Airport Authority
- Vancouver Airport Services
