= Calgary Airport Authority =

Airport authority in Alberta, Canada

- Company type: Community-based, non-profit
- Founded: Calgary, Alberta, July 26, 1990; 35 years ago
- Headquarters: Calgary International Airport
- Number of locations: 2
- Area served: Calgary Metropolitan Region
- Key people: Andrea Robertson (Board Chair); Chris Dinsdale (President & CEO)
- Services: Airport operator
- Revenue: ▲CA$518.9 million (2024)
- Owner: Community-based
- Website: yyc.com/corporate/

The Calgary Airport Authority is an airport operator formed on July 26, 1990 through the Regional Airports Authorities Act passed by the Legislative Assembly of Alberta in 1989. It is responsible for the management and operation of Calgary International Airport, the fourth largest airport in Canada by passenger traffic with 18.9 million passengers traversing through the airport in 2024, and the Springbank Airport, which serves as a backup to the main airport. The authority is a non-profit organisation and, as per the Act, has no shareholders and does not pay dividends.

The authority is governed by a 14-member board of directors with members appointed to represent the various municipalities and municipal districts that the airport serves, as well as the Government of Canada. The municipalities, municipal districts, and organisations that the board represents are Calgary through three members, Rocky View County through a single member, and the Calgary Camber of Commerce Long Range Planning Committee through eight members. The Government of Canada is represented by two members directly appointed by the government.

== Operations ==
The Calgary Airport Authority primarily operates the Calgary International Airport, part of the National Airports System, and has been its operator since the authority's formation. It has additionally operated the Springbank Airport since 1997. Both airports are owned by Transport Canada and leased back to the authority.

== See also ==
- Greater Toronto Airports Authority and Toronto Port Authority
- Edmonton Regional Airports Authority
- Regina Airport Authority
- Vancouver Airport Services
- Halifax International Airport Authority
