= Regina Airport =

Regina Airport may refer to:

- Regina International Airport (IATA: YQR, ICAO: CYQR) in Regina, Saskatchewan, Canada
  - Regina Airport Authority
- Régina Airport (IATA: REI, ICAO: SOOR) in Régina, French Guiana
- Regina/Aerogate Aerodrome (TC LID: CAG2)
- Regina Beach Airport (TC LID: CKL9)
