= National Airports System =

Airports in Canada

In Canada, the National Airports System (French: Réseau national d'aéroports, NAS) is a group of major airports defined in the National Airports Policy published in 1994. It was intended to include all airports with an annual traffic of 200,000 passengers or more, as well as airports serving the national, provincial and territorial capitals.

All airports in the NAS, with the exception of the three territorial capitals, are owned by Transport Canada and leased to the local authorities operating them. The three territorial airports are owned and, with the exception of Iqaluit Airport, are operated by their respective territorial governments. (Note: Transport Canada indicates that Iqaluit is operated by the Government of Nunavut. The Canada Flight Supplement, published by Nav Canada, and WASCO say that it is operated by Nunavut Airport Services Limited.) Iqaluit is operated by Nunavut Airport Services Limited (NASL), a subsidiary of WASCO (Winnipeg Airport Services Corporation), which in turn is a subsidiary of Winnipeg Airports Authority.

== NAS airports ==
The following list contains the 26 NAS airports effective 13 May 2024, the location, operator, and their passenger numbers for 2023 (except where noted):

Province/territory	Airport	City	IATA Code	Operator	Passengers (2023)
Alberta	Calgary International	Calgary	YYC	Calgary Airport Authority	18,490,283
Alberta	Edmonton International	Edmonton	YEG	Edmonton Regional Airports Authority	7,499,163
British Columbia	Kelowna International	Kelowna	YLW	City of Kelowna	2,032,624
British Columbia	Prince George	Prince George	YXS	Prince George Airport Authority	417,848
British Columbia	Vancouver International	Vancouver	YVR	Vancouver International Airport Authority	24,938,184
British Columbia	Victoria International	Victoria	YYJ	Victoria Airport Authority	1,740,107
Manitoba	Winnipeg International	Winnipeg	YWG	Winnipeg Airports Authority	4,094,793
New Brunswick	Fredericton International	Fredericton	YFC	Fredericton International Airport Authority	333,813
New Brunswick	Greater Moncton International	Greater Moncton	YQM	Greater Moncton International Airport Authority	600,121
New Brunswick	Saint John	Saint John	YSJ	Saint John Airport Inc	175,100
Newfoundland and Labrador	Gander International	Gander	YQX	Gander International Airport Authority	109,678
Newfoundland and Labrador	St. John's International	St. John's	YYT	St. John's International Airport Authority	1,260,000
Northwest Territories	Yellowknife	Yellowknife	YZF	Government of the Northwest Territories	392,130 (2015)
Nova Scotia	Halifax International	Halifax	YHZ	Halifax International Airport Authority	3,579,293
Nunavut	Iqaluit	Iqaluit	YFB	Nunavut Airport Services Limited	156,633 (2015)
Ontario	London International	London	YXU	Greater London International Airports Authority	332,447
Ontario	Ottawa International	Ottawa	YOW	Ottawa Macdonald-Cartier International Airport Authority	4,095,914
Ontario	Thunder Bay International	Thunder Bay	YQT	Thunder Bay International Airports	714,070
Ontario	Toronto International	Toronto	YYZ	Greater Toronto Airports Authority	44,800,000
Prince Edward Island	Charlottetown	Charlottetown	YYG	Charlottetown Airport Authority	402,686
Quebec	Montréal–Trudeau International	Montreal	YUL	Aéroports de Montréal	21,173,941
Quebec	Montréal–Mirabel International	Montreal	YMX	Aéroports de Montréal	0
Quebec	Québec City International	Quebec City	YQB	Aéroport de Québec	1,688,736
Saskatchewan	Regina International	Regina	YQR	Regina Airport Authority	981,845
Saskatchewan	Saskatoon International	Saskatoon	YXE	Saskatoon Airport Authority	1,277,863
Yukon	Whitehorse International	Whitehorse	YXY	Government of Yukon	286,407 (2015)
