= Petpeswick Lake =

Lake in Nova Scotia

- Interactive map of Petpeswick Lake
- Location: Nova Scotia
- Coordinates: 44°45′33″N 63°11′10″W
- Type: Glacial
- Etymology: Koolpijooik
- Basin countries: Canada
- Max. length: 3 kilometres (1.9 mi)
- Max. width: 0.8 kilometres (0.50 mi)
- Islands: 4

Petpeswick Lake (IPA: /ˈpɛt.pəz.wɪk leɪk/) is a glacial lake located in Halifax County, Nova Scotia, Canada, near Head of Jeddore and Musquodoboit Harbour. It is located approximately 33.5 kilometres (20.8 mi) to Halifax and 66 kilometres (41 mi) to Truro. The lake was named in October 4, 1921.

== Etymology ==
Petpeswick Lake is named after the Mi’kmaq word Koolpijooik, which referred to what is now known as Petpeswick Harbour.

== Geography ==
Petpeswick Lake is measured approximately 3 kilometres (1.9 mi) in length and 0.8 kilometres (0.50 mi) in width. The lake is connected to Long Bridge Lake by a small, narrow stream. The lake has four islands. However, only one islands are named, Big Island. Near lakes include Scots Lake, Paces Lake, Grassy Lake, and Chezzetcook Lake.

== Musquodoboit Harbour/Petpeswick Lake Water Aerodrome ==
Petpeswick Lake is a private site of a water aerodrome used for seaplane operations. The facility, Musquodoboit Harbour/Petpeswick Lake Water Aerodrome supports general aviation seaplane activity in the surrounding area. The registered aerodrome is listed in aviation databases and is recognized as a public water aerodrome serving in the Eastern Shore. Its elevation is 49 feet (15 m), and operated by David Grimes. Its Transport Canada Location Identifier code is CPL9.

== Access ==
Petpeswick Lake can be accessed via Nova Scotia Trunk 7 and Nova Scotia Highway 107. It can also be accessed by East Petpeswick Road and minor forest trails.

== See also ==
- List of lakes of Nova Scotia
- List of airports in Nova Scotia
