= Halifax Stanfield International Airport =

Airport in Goffs, Nova Scotia, Canada

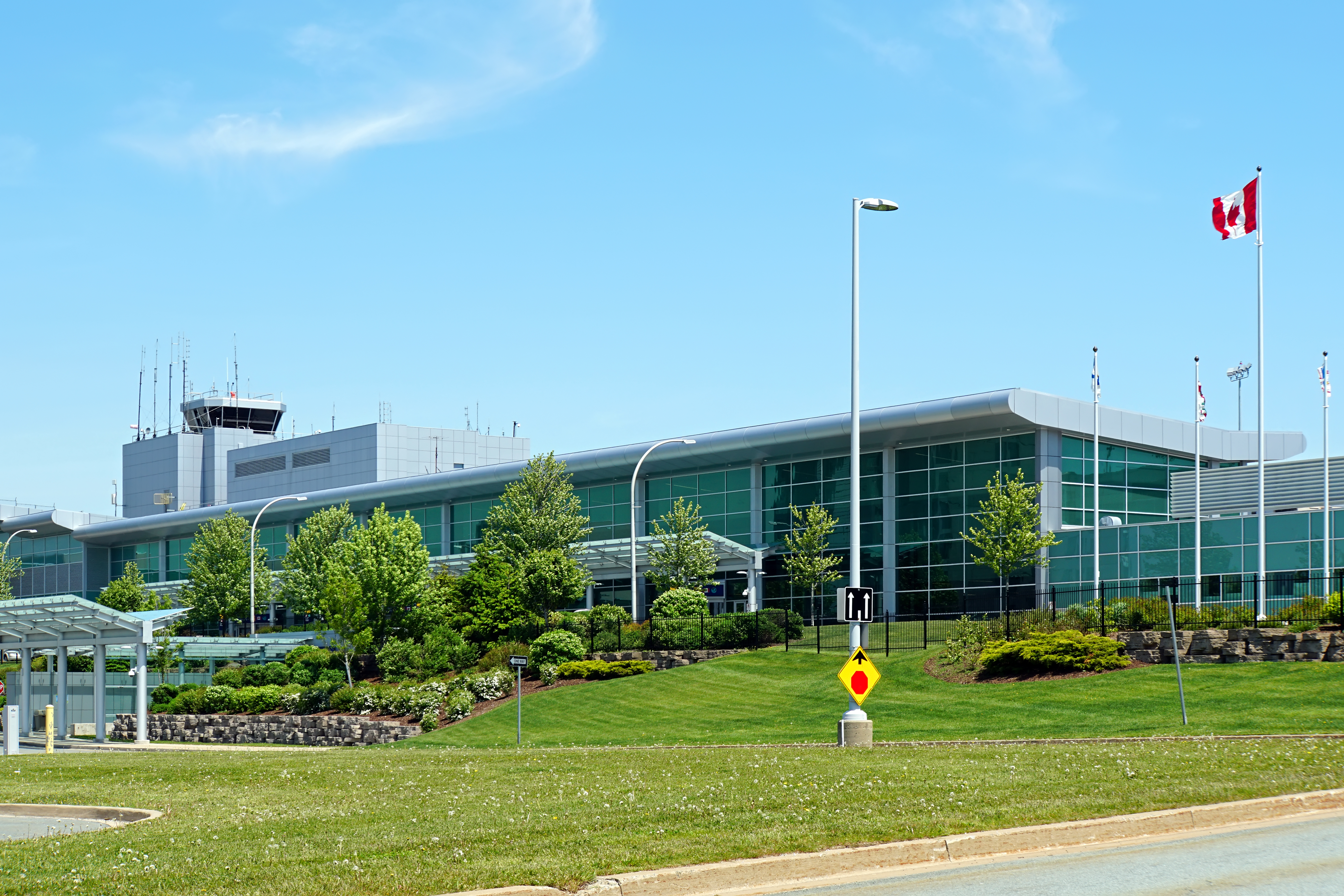
- IATA: YHZ; ICAO: CYHZ; WMO: 71395

Summary
- Airport type: Public
- Owner: Transport Canada
- Operator: Halifax International Airport Authority
- Serves: Halifax Regional Municipality
- Location: Goffs, Nova Scotia, Canada
- Opened: August 1, 1960; 66 years ago
- Focus city for: Air Canada; Porter Airlines; WestJet
- Operating base for: Cougar Helicopters; Maritime Air Charter; PAL Airlines
- Time zone: AST (UTC−04:00)
  - Summer (DST): ADT (UTC−03:00)
- Elevation AMSL: 477 ft (145 m)
- Coordinates: 44°52′47″N 063°30′37″W
- Public transit access: MetroX 320
- Website: www.halifaxstanfield.ca

Map
- Location within Nova Scotia YHZ/CYHZ (Canada)

Runways
Direction	Length		Surface
Direction	ft	m	Surface
05/23	10,500	3,200	Asphalt/Concrete
14/32	7,700	2,347	Asphalt

Statistics (2025)
- Total passengers: 4,140,484
- Sources: CFS, HIAA

Halifax Stanfield International Airport (IATA: YHZ, ICAO: CYHZ) is a Canadian airport in Goffs, Nova Scotia, a rural community of the Halifax Regional Municipality. It serves the Halifax region, mainland Nova Scotia, and adjacent areas in the neighbouring Maritime provinces. The airport is named in honour of Robert Stanfield, the 17th Premier of Nova Scotia and former leader of the federal Progressive Conservative Party of Canada.

The airport, owned by Transport Canada since it opened in 1960, has been operated since 2000 by the Halifax International Airport Authority (HIAA). It forms part of the National Airports System.

Designated as an international airport by Transport Canada, Halifax Stanfield is the 8th busiest airport in Canada by passenger traffic. It handled a total of 4,140,484 passengers in 2025 and 84,045 aircraft movements in 2017. It is an operating base for Cougar Helicopters, Maritime Air Charter, and PAL Airlines, as well as a focus city for Air Canada and Porter Airlines.

== History ==
The airport terminal soon after construction in 1960

=== Background ===
An airfield in the West End, known as Chebucto Field, was built as the Halifax Civic Airport by the City of Halifax in 1931 on the former site of Blueball Farm. It served as the city's main airport until 1941, when it was closed and leased to the federal government to serve as an army camp in World War II. Today Saunders Park, named after the first Halifax airport manager and Aero Club manager Donald Saunders, and some parts of the residential area of Westmount Subdivision, mark the site. RCAF Station Shearwater subsequently functioned as Halifax's primary airport until the current airport was opened. In October 1945, the City of Halifax asked the federal Department of Transport for help choosing a site for a new civil airport.

A key factor was to find a site near Halifax with a minimal number of days per year when fog would affect airport operation. Lucasville was favoured, but after a year of study it was found to have similar average visibility to the frequently foggy airport at Shearwater. A site near Kelly Lake was then scrutinized based on a recommendation by Trans-Canada Air Lines. After two years of monitoring, the site was officially approved in 1954 for construction of a modern, C$5 million airport. The land was purchased by the City of Halifax on April 5, 1955, while the Department of Transport was tasked with building the airport.

=== Construction and early years ===
Construction of the new airport began in November 1955. The runways were built by Diamond Construction of Halifax. The modernist terminal building was designed by Gilleland and Strutt, an architecture firm which previously designed a similar-looking terminal at Ottawa.

The new airport was substantially completed in June 1960, and a temporary licence for daytime visual flight rules (VFR) operations was issued that month. An opening gala was held on Dominion Day of 1960, the same day a licence permitting full operations was issued. At 4:50 am on August 1, 1960 the first airplane landed there, a Vickers Viscount running the Trans-Canada Airlines Flight 400 between Montreal and Newfoundland. It was piloted by Halifax native W.E. Barnes. The first overseas flight arrived an hour later, travelling from London en route to Montreal. The airport was formally inaugurated on September 10, 1960 by the Minister of Transport, George Hees. The cost of construction was about $18 million.

Passenger numbers grew steadily during the first few decades of operation. The passenger terminal was substantially renovated in 1966. A 5,000-square-metre (54,000 sq ft) passenger terminal extension opened in July 1976, which saw the installation of the airport's first three air bridges. New temporary passenger walkways were constructed in 1988 to serve regional carriers. By 1990, approximately 2,500,000 passengers passed through the airport annually, up from about 180,000 when it first opened. A 400-square-metre (4,300 sq ft) southern expansion was opened in December 1994 by Minister of Transport Doug Young, while the check-in area was expanded in 1998.

Owing to the National Airports Policy, announced in 1994, the Halifax International Airport Authority (HIAA) was founded in November 1995. Management of the airport was officially passed from Transport Canada to HIAA on February 1, 2000.

=== Operation Yellow Ribbon ===
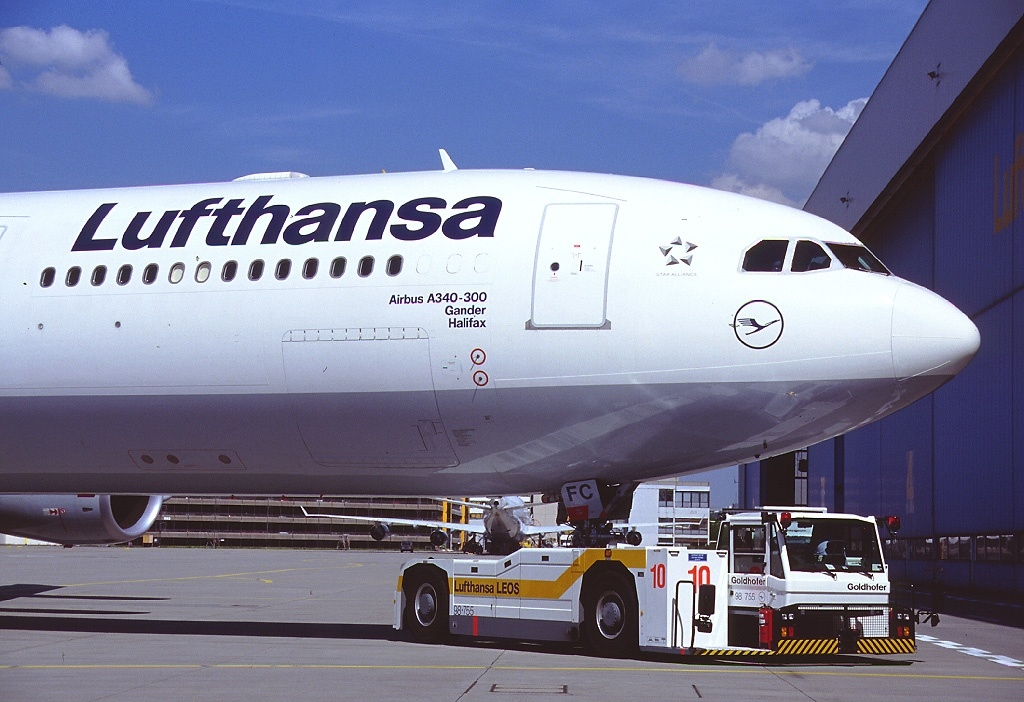
Lufthansa's Gander Halifax plane

Following the September 11 attacks in 2001 the airport took part in Operation Yellow Ribbon, commenced to accept United States civilian flights after the Federal Aviation Administration closed down U.S. airspace. Halifax airport took in 47 flights, more flights than any other Canadian airport involved in the operation. These flights were in total carrying about 7,300 passengers, more than any other Canadian airport involved in the operation other than Vancouver, which registered 8,500. Much of this was because flights that were coming from Europe were told to avoid the major airports in Central Canada, like Toronto Pearson, Montréal-Dorval, and Ottawa Macdonald–Cartier International Airport.

Shortly after the attacks, the airport was advised that as many as 40 to 50 planes would divert to Halifax. In response, runway 15/33 (now 14/32) was shut down to accommodate the parked aircraft. The first diverted aircraft, a United Airlines Boeing 767, arrived at 11:35 am. The number of arriving passengers greatly outstripped the capacity of the airport, which faced processing 7,000–8,000 people with an arrivals facility designed to handle 900 per hour. The Halifax municipal government was tasked with providing emergency shelter, food, transportation and care to the stranded travellers, who were housed in city sports complexes and schools, churches, universities, military bases, as well as the homes of private citizens. A memorial ceremony was held in the airport terminal on September 14, 2001.

To honour the people of Gander and Halifax for their support during the operation, Lufthansa named a new Airbus A340-300 Gander-Halifax on May 16, 2002. That airplane is listed with the registration D-AIFC, and is the first aircraft of the whole fleet with a city name outside of Germany. On September 11, 2006, five years after the attacks, United States Secretary of State Condoleezza Rice visited Halifax airport and delivered a speech of thanks.

=== Renaming ===
After the December 2003 death of Robert Stanfield, the former Premier of Nova Scotia and federal Leader of the Official Opposition, several proposals were made in Nova Scotia to honour the widely respected politician. In early 2005 the airport's governing board voted to rename the terminal building after Stanfield. The terminal was officially rechristened in a ceremony held on September 9, 2005, when the Stanfield family unveiled a brass memorial plaque in the airport observation floor.

On Friday, February 9, 2007, Prime Minister Stephen Harper arrived at the airport and formally renamed the entire facility from "Halifax International Airport" to "Halifax Robert L. Stanfield International Airport" in a further honour to Stanfield; at that time the terminal name was dropped and reverted to its original status.

== Awards ==
Halifax International Airport fared well in the 2005 AETRA survey for passenger satisfaction, produced by the International Air Transport Association (IATA) and Airports Council International. The airport was ranked the best airport in the Americas for the second year in a row, as well as the best airport in the less than 5 million passengers a year category for the third year in a row (worldwide), and best domestic airport for the second year in a row.

In March 2007, the airport earned two first-place finishes in the 2006 Airports Council International (ACI) Service Quality Awards held in Dubai, United Arab Emirates. For the fourth consecutive year, it ranked first in overall passenger satisfaction for airports worldwide with under five million passengers. In addition, the airport ranked first in the Americas in the new category of Airport People Awards, and second in the best domestic airport worldwide category.

In early 2010, Halifax Stanfield was rated by passengers as the Best Airport in the World in its class (under 5 million) for the seventh year in a row.

In 2011, it won third Best Airport in North America of the Airport Service Quality Awards by Airports Council International, as well as 3rd Best Airport by Size in the 2 to 5 million passenger category.

== Facilities ==
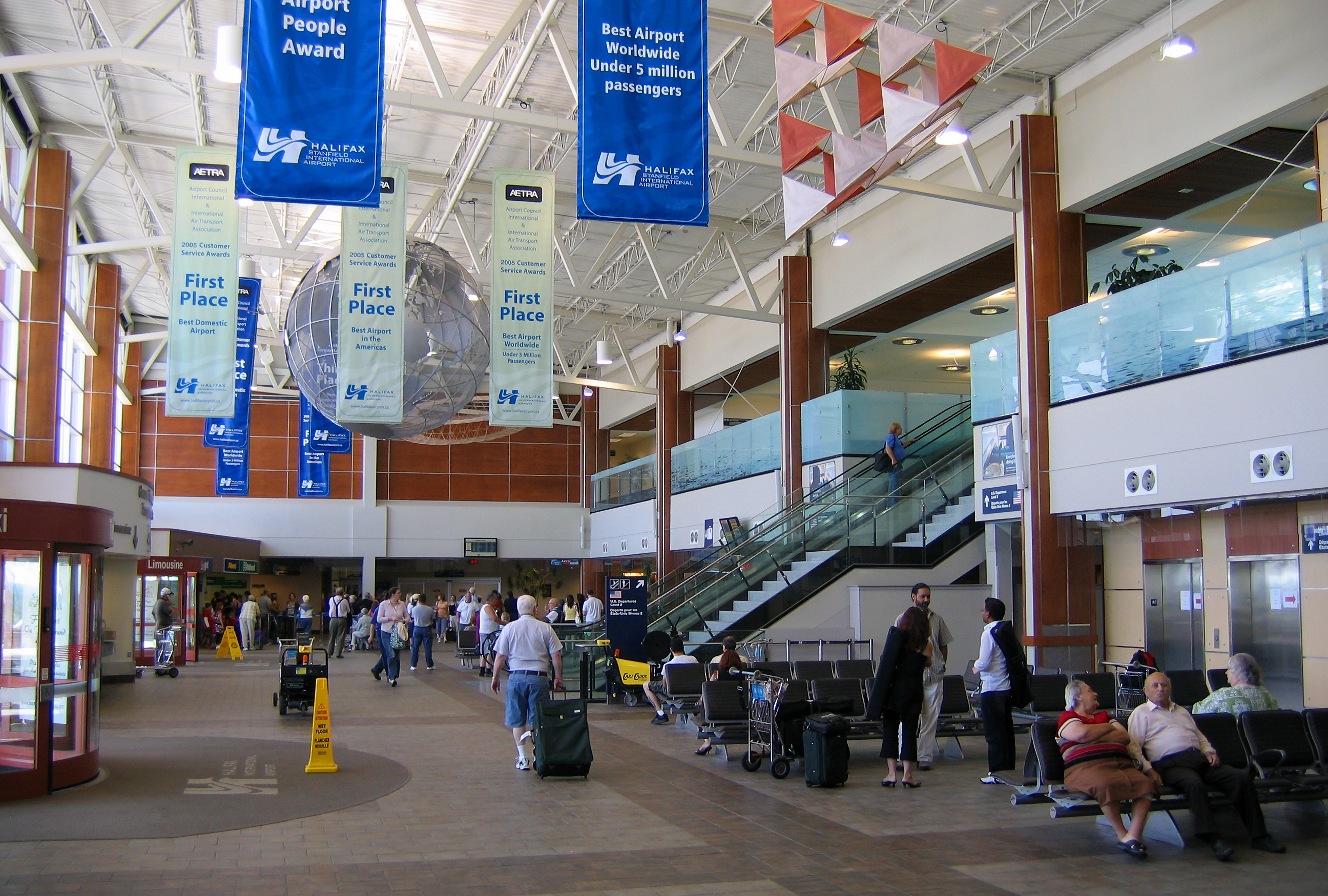
Domestic arrivals hall and escalators to U.S. departures

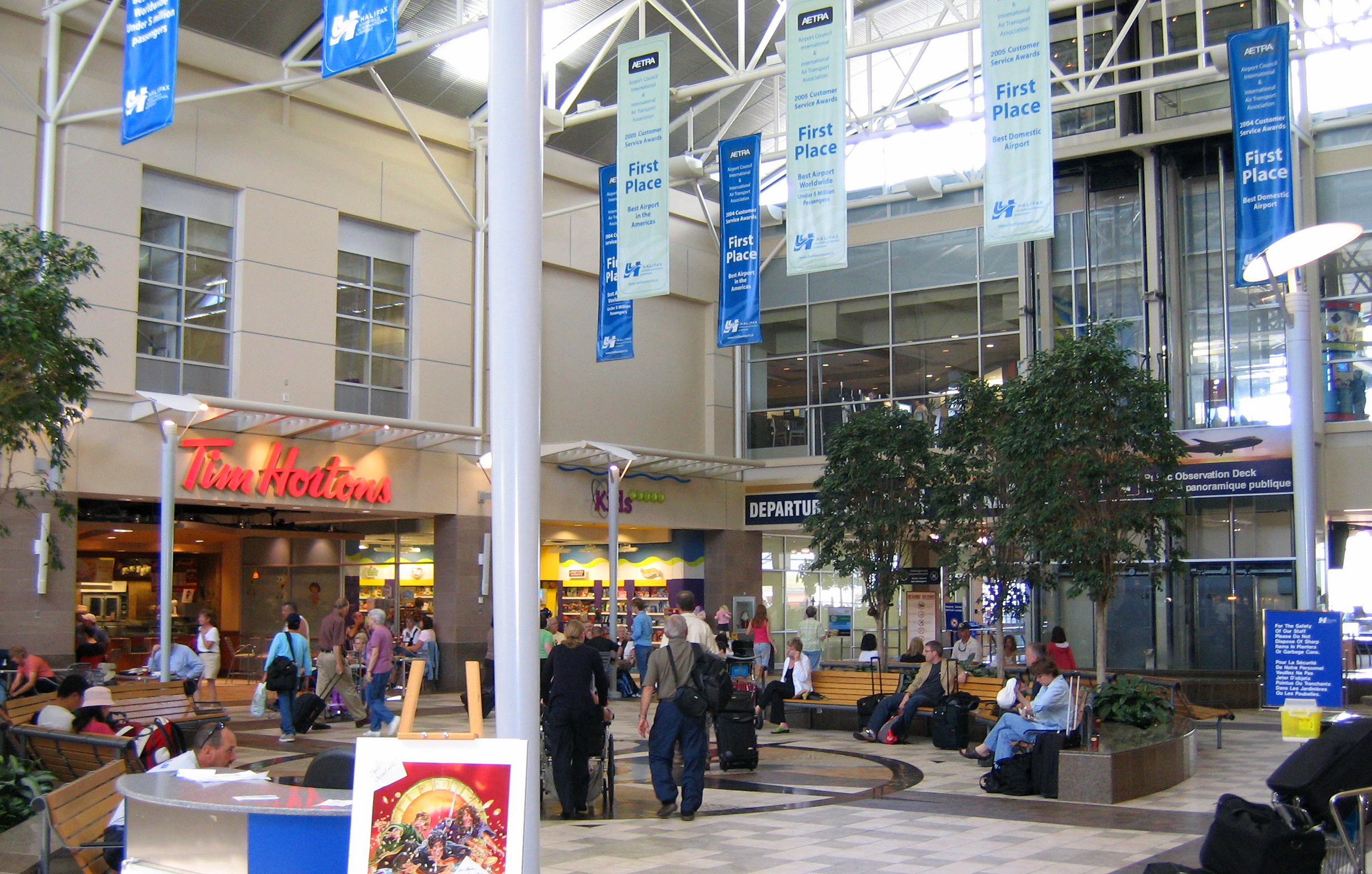
Airport Square with elevators to observation deck

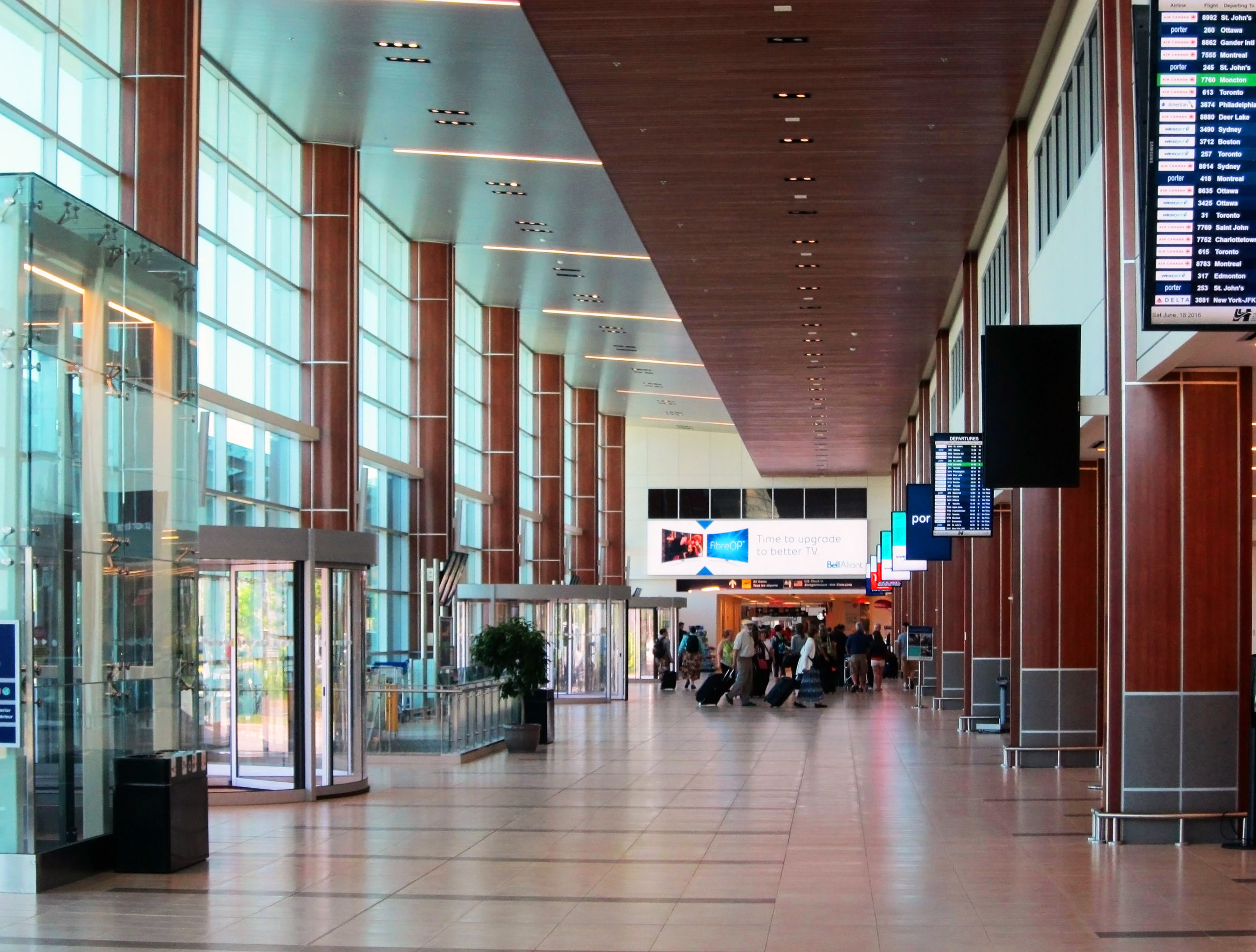
Check-in hall

=== Terminal ===
The Air Terminal Building (ATB) was opened in August 1960. It cost about C$4.5 million to construct and, upon opening, included health, immigration and customs facilities for international passengers; a restaurant; a control tower and administrative offices; and two observation decks that projected onto the apron. It was designed by Gilleland and Strutt of Ottawa, in collaboration with C.D. Davidson of Halifax as well as A.W. Ramsey, chief architect at the Department of Transport. The main contractor was Ellis-Don. The modern complex contained Nova Scotia's first set of escalators.

Today, the terminal serves over four million passengers per year. The growth experienced in the decades since the airport's construction has necessitated constant renovations, and there is often construction occurring there. Since the HIAA took over management of the airport in 2000, over $200 million has been invested in improvements to the terminal building.

A new international arrivals area, three times larger than the previous one, opened at the north end of the terminal in August 2001. The upper level of this expansion included a space reserved for United States border preclearance facilities (see below). A new domestic arrivals hall, accommodating three baggage reclaim belts and a Nova Scotia visitor's centre, officially opened on December 18, 2002. Work also began in 2002 on a significant renovation to the central lobby of the terminal building. This expanded retail and dining space opened as the Airport Square on November 9, 2003. A third-storey public observation deck opened at the same time. A southern terminal expansion was completed in 2005, expanding the departures holdroom, adding three new jet bridges, and creating a dedicated commuter aircraft facility with new ground-loading gates.

Several improvements to the terminal were made in 2018–19. A three-storey extension to the central portion of the terminal building was constructed, projecting into the centre apron. The ground floor houses an expanded security screening area, increasing capacity and allowing for the implementation of "CATSA Plus", the Canadian Air Transport Security Authority's latest checkpoint design, which requires more space. The second floor contains an expanded, double-height passenger waiting area, with additional seating, as well as new dining and retail space. At the same time, new security features were added around the terminal, including anti-ramming bollards, blast-resistant glazing, more security cameras, and new access control features. Lastly, the domestic baggage claim area was renovated for cosmetic reasons. Ceilings were raised, column sizes were reduced, and new flooring was installed.

In 2025–26, the airport unveiled a renovated international arrivals area and a new International Connections Facility (ICF). The ICF allows international passengers to transfer to domestic flights without exiting the secure area of the airport.

The terminal now has a total of 32 gate positions, with 13 using airbridges (gates 12, 14–16, 18, 20, 22–24, and 26–28). The remaining gates are ground-loading positions. Gates 22–24 and 26–28 are swing gates: a glassed-in secure corridor allows incoming international passengers and pre-cleared departing US passengers to be segregated from those in the domestic/international departure lounge; when used for US departures, these gates are numbered 52–54 and 56–58, respectively. Gates 2 (a-e) to 9 are ground-loading positions dedicated to domestic regional operations. Gates 34 to 46 are ground-loading gate positions for US flights.

=== Runways and taxiways ===
Halifax Stanfield has had two runways, arranged perpendicular to each other, since opening in 1960. In press releases the airport authority refers to the longer one as the "main runway" and the shorter as the "secondary runway".

Number	Length	Width
05/23	3,200 metres (10,500 ft)	61 metres (200 ft)
14/32	2,346 metres (7,700 ft)	61 metres (200 ft)

All taxiways are 75 feet (23 m) wide except for the 50-foot-wide taxiway K.

The airport opened with (using the present-day naming scheme) taxiways A, B (formerly part of A), C, D (section between the apron and the main runway), G, E, F, and H. Then-taxiway B and most of taxiway D (now M and D; see below) were constructed in 1982, providing a taxi route paralleling runway 14/32. In 2010, extension of the taxiway system resulted in an increased airside area, creating space for several newly constructed large hangars. Canadian Helicopters, Cougar Helicopters, Gateway Facilities, and IMP Group operate these new hangars along taxiways J and K.

In November 2012, an extension of both ends of runway 05/23 was completed to accommodate larger, wide-body aircraft. This increased its length from 8,800 ft (2,682 m) to 10,500 ft (3,200 m). This increase resulted in the renaming of several taxiways: taxiway B became M, and the end of taxiway A was renamed B. Taxiway F was also extended to meet the threshold of runway 23. In 2016 a new apron was constructed off taxiway J to serve primarily as a place to park cargo freighters.

The airport covers a total of 2,372 acres (960 ha) of land.

=== Hotel ===
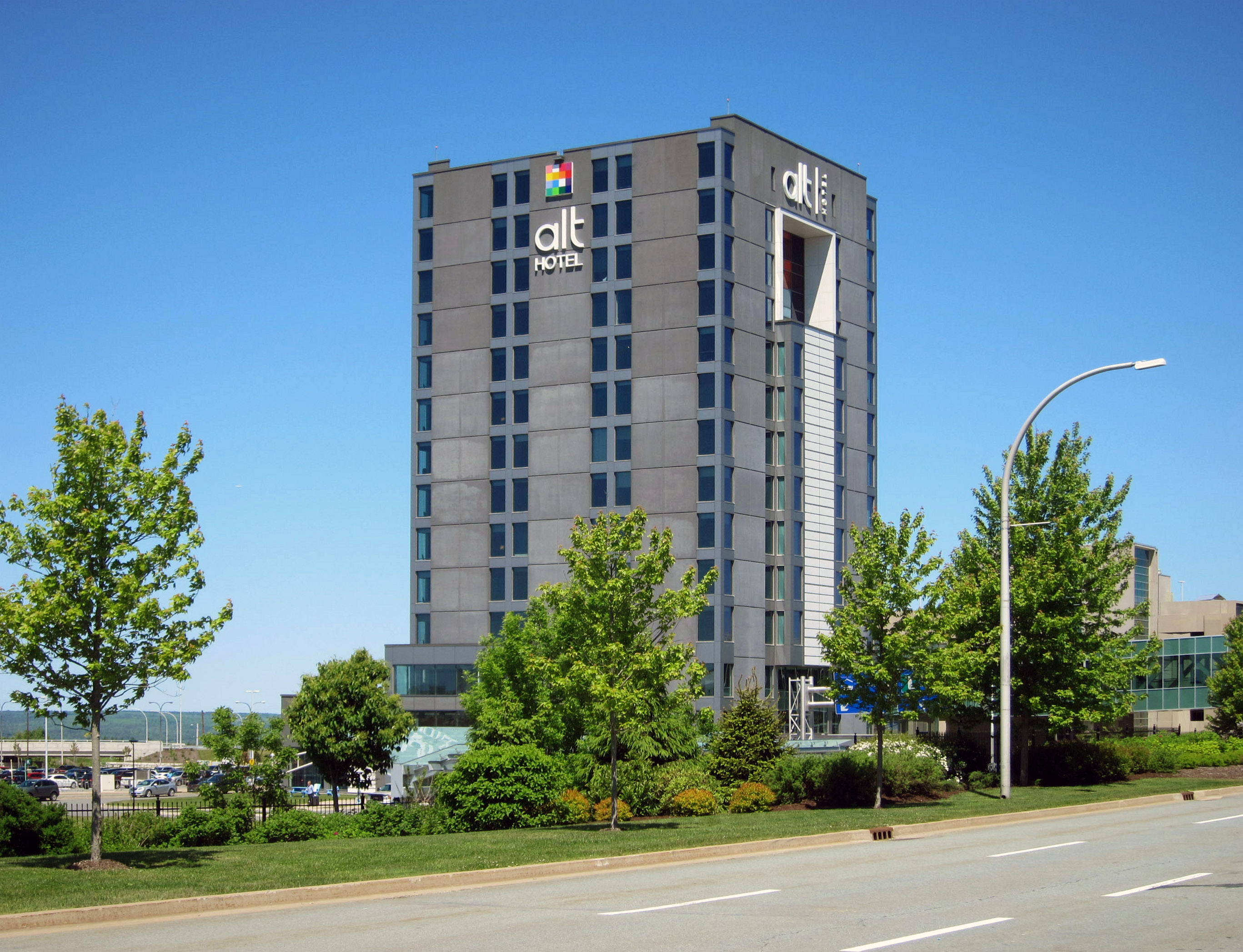
Alt Hotel

As early as the 1980s, the private sector expressed interest in building a hotel next to the airport terminal. In May 1988, Halifax-based Keddy's Motor Inns, a major Maritime hotel chain, signed a contract with Transport Canada to build a $20-million, 200-room hotel on Transport Canada-owned land opposite the terminal. Work on the Pegasus Hotel began in May 1990. After over $4 million had been spent, construction was halted in December 1990 by the main contractor, GEM Construction Specialists, due to unpaid work. Keddy's faced financial troubles and was $35 million in debt, and project funding from a consortium of Hong Kongese and Taiwanese immigrant investors fell through. The federal government searched for a company interested in completing the project, but the only proposal received was deemed inadequate. The unfinished shell of the hotel was considered an embarrassing eyesore, and Transport Canada demolished it in 1996.

The airport authority announced on May 13, 2008, that a letter of intent had been signed with New Castle Hotels and Southwest Properties for construction of a 176-room Sheraton hotel. It was estimated to cost about $30 million and would have included a fitness centre, swimming pool, conference centre, and dining facilities. In early 2009, the airport authority and the developers jointly agreed to postpone construction of the hotel due to the global economic downturn. In early 2010 the developers pulled out of the deal.

On October 26, 2011, the airport authority announced the construction of an on-site 14-storey, 169-room, Alt Hotel. Linked to both the passenger terminal and the parking garage by an enclosed footbridge, the $27-million building was built by Marco Construction of Halifax and opened in 2013. Operated by Groupe Germain Hospitalité, the hotel includes conference and banquet facilities, a fitness centre, a pool, and a 24-hour cafe. It was built with soundproof windows to block aircraft noise.

=== Operations ===
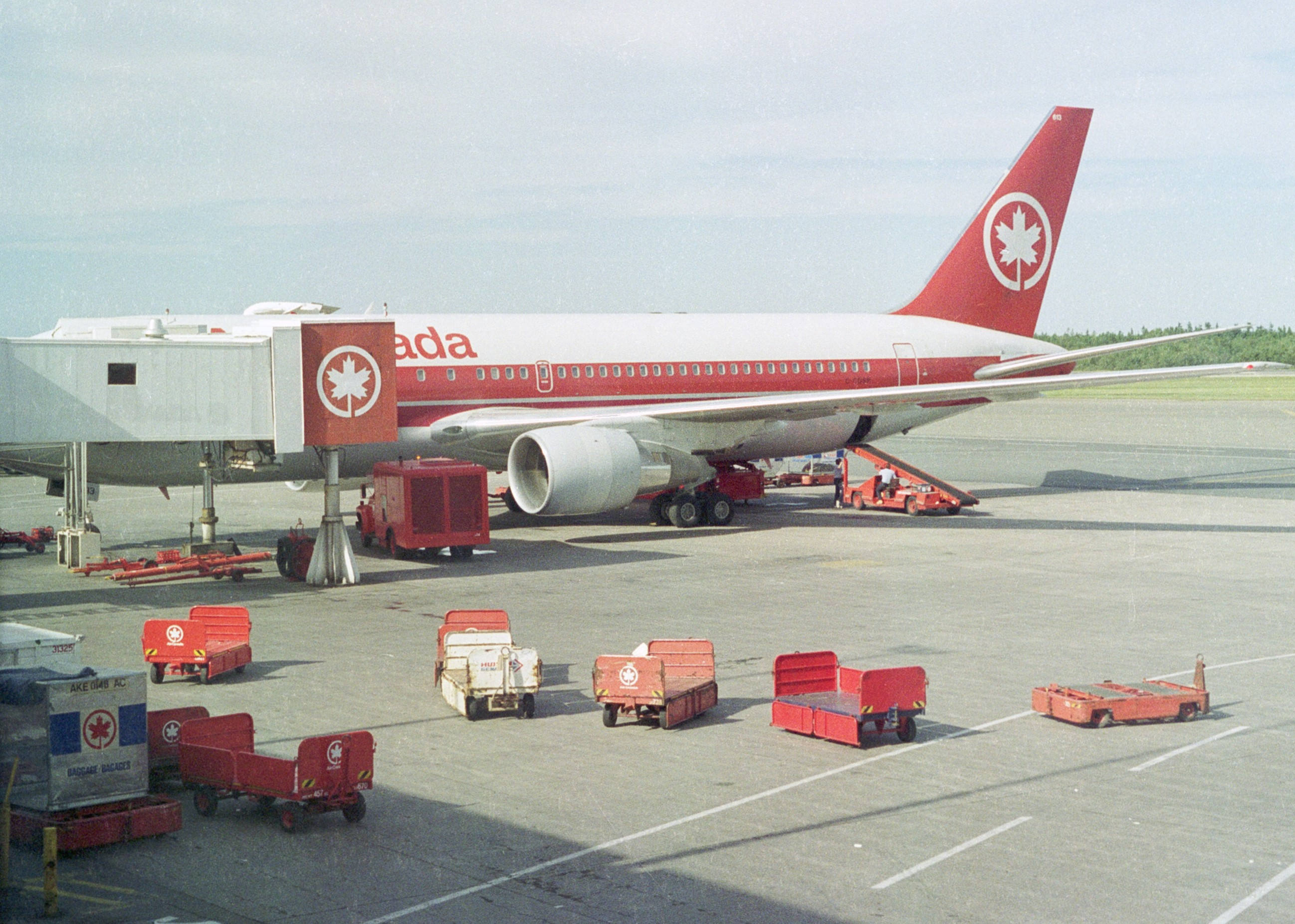
An Air Canada Boeing 767-200 parked at the gate in 1990

The airport is served by several fixed-base operators (FBOs), which handle fueling, ground handling, hangarage, catering, etc. They include Air Canada Technical Services, Aircraft Service International, Gateway Facilities, Halifax International Fuel Facility Consortium (HIFFC), Inland Technologies, Innotech-Execaire, PAL Aviation Services, Shell AeroCentre, Strategic Aviation, and Swissport.

Halifax Regional Police provides policing services. Emergency rescue and firefighting services are based in the Combined Services Complex (CSC), which also houses the airport's maintenance operations. The C$24-million, 6,000-square-metre (65,000 sq ft) building opened in 2010, replacing the previous fire hall (built 1981) as well as the former maintenance garage, which opened with the airport in 1960. The complex includes a fire station, vehicular wash and storage bays, offices, conference rooms, staff rooms, sleeping quarters, and an emergency communications centre. The CSC was the first LEED certified building at the airport.

Halifax International Airport was one of a handful of sites in eastern North America designated an emergency landing site for the Space Shuttle if a launch was aborted following liftoff. The airport kept in contact with Transport Canada and the National Aeronautics and Space Administration during each shuttle launch.

=== Business park ===
The airport is located adjacent to the Aerotech Business Park, a municipally run business park originally catering towards aviation companies. The zoning has since been changed to allow for other types of companies to locate there. The largest tenants are Pratt & Whitney Canada and L3 Communications.

== Ongoing developments ==
The latest airport master plan was published in January 2011. Many of its proposals have since been realised, such as construction of an on-site hotel, the southern terminal expansion, and extensions of the main runway. Possible future plans outlined in this document include new taxiways and parking stands, another de-icing area, space for new logistics and aviation services development, and a major expansion of the public road network (partly built) to facilitate development of a large commercial area between the airport and the highway.

On November 15, 2018, transport minister Marc Garneau announced Government of Canada funding, via the National Trade Corridors Fund, toward a $36-million expansion of the airport's air cargo handling facilities. The federal government will contribute $18 million, while $5 million will come from the province and $13 million from the airport authority. The expansion will be built on forested land adjacent to the existing cargo area.

== Airlines and destinations ==
=== Passenger ===
Airlines	Destinations
Air Canada	London–Heathrow (resumes December 1 2026), Montréal–Trudeau, Toronto–Pearson; Seasonal: Montego Bay (resumes December 3, 2026), Nassau, Vancouver
Air Canada Express	Boston, Deer Lake, Gander, Goose Bay, Newark, Ottawa, St. John's (NL)
Air Canada Rouge	Seasonal: Barbados (begins December 17, 2026), Cancún, London–Heathrow (ends November 30, 2026), Montréal–Trudeau, Orlando, Tampa
American Airlines	Seasonal: Washington–National
American Eagle	Seasonal: Boston, Chicago–O'Hare, New York–LaGuardia
BermudAir	Bermuda
Delta Connection	Seasonal: Boston, New York–LaGuardia
Discover Airlines	Seasonal: Frankfurt
Edelweiss Air	Seasonal: Zurich
Flair Airlines	Kitchener/Waterloo, Toronto–Pearson
Pascan Aviation	Saint John (NB)
Porter Airlines	Hamilton (ON), London (ON) (begins April 12, 2027), Montréal–MET, Montréal–Trudeau, Ottawa, St. John's (NL), Toronto–Billy Bishop, Toronto–Pearson; Seasonal: Cancún (begins December 18, 2026), Deer Lake, Fort Lauderdale (begins December 17, 2026), Orlando
United Express	Newark; Seasonal: Chicago–O'Hare
WestJet	Calgary, Edmonton, Toronto–Pearson; Seasonal: Amsterdam, Barcelona, Dublin, Edinburgh, Lisbon, London–Gatwick, Paris–Charles de Gaulle, Regina, Saskatoon, Vancouver, Winnipeg

=== Cargo ===
Airlines	Destinations
Cargojet	Montréal–Mirabel
FedEx Express	Toronto–Pearson
Korean Air Cargo	Seoul–Incheon
Maersk Air Cargo	Liège
SF Airlines	Ezhou
Sky Lease Cargo	Changsha

== Statistics ==
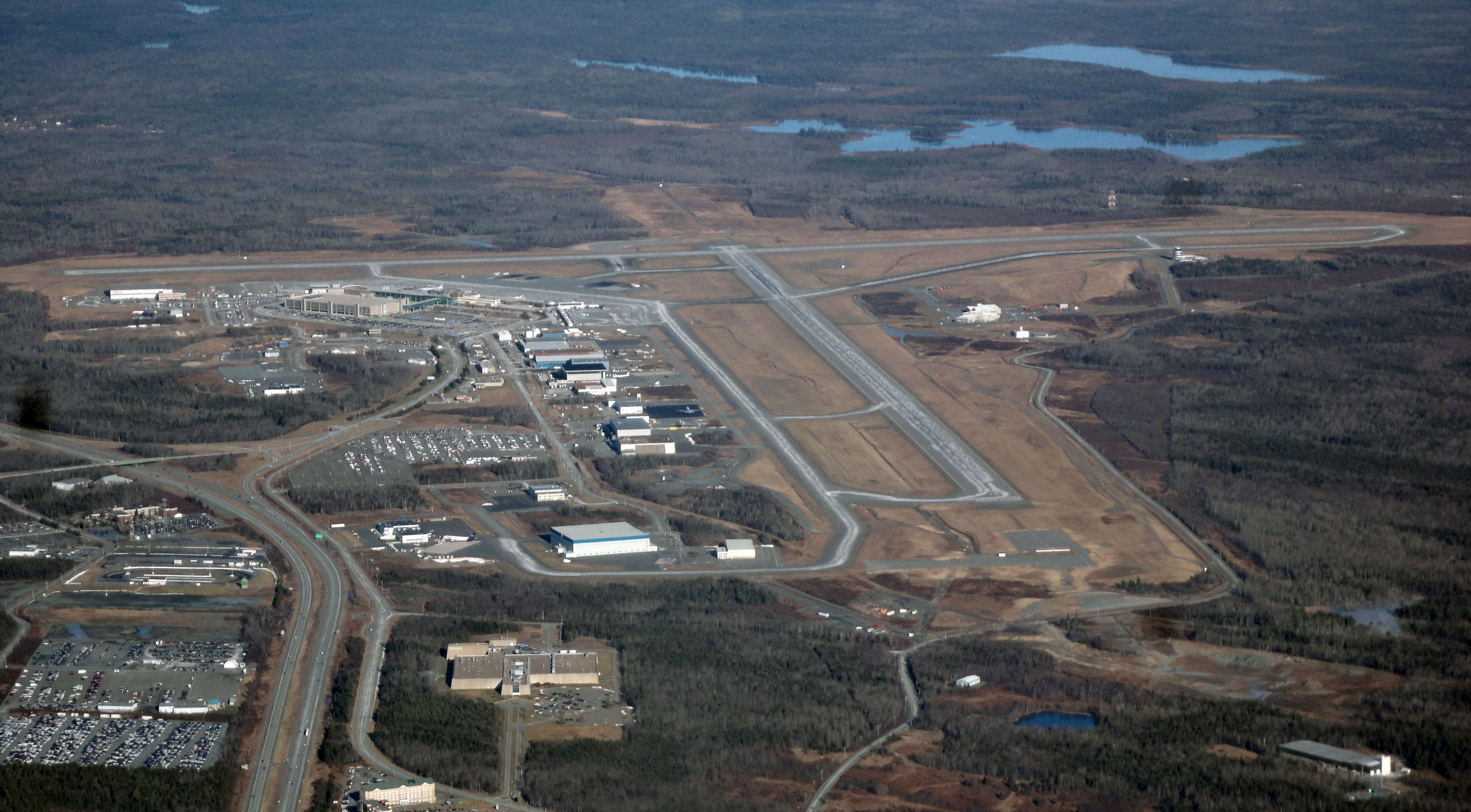
Aerial view of the airport in 2011, prior to the extension of runway 05/23

Annual passenger traffic (enplaned and deplaned) at Halifax Airport, 1996 through 2024
Year	Passengers	Year	Passengers	Year	Passengers	Year	Passengers	Year	Passengers
2025	4,140,484	2015	3,702,705	2005	3,229,111	1995		1985	
2024	3,979,785	2014	3,663,039	2004	3,242,389	1994		1984	
2023	3,579,293	2013	3,585,864	2003	2,973,187	1993		1983	
2022	3,107,425	2012	3,605,701	2002	2,853,778	1992		1982	
2021	1,076,458	2011	3,594,164	2001	2,852,061	1991		1981	
2020		2010		2000		1990		1980	
2019		2009		1999		1989		1979	
2018		2008		1998		1988		1978	
2017		2007		1997		1987		1977	
2016		2006		1996		1986		1976	

=== Top destinations ===
Busiest domestic routes from YHZ (as of 6 July 2025)
Rank	Airport	Flights per week	Carriers
1	Toronto–Pearson, Ontario	128	Air Canada, Flair, Porter, WestJet
2	St. John's, Newfoundland and Labrador	55	Air Canada, Porter
3	Montreal, Quebec	48	Air Canada, Porter
4	Ottawa, Ontario	43	Air Canada, Porter
5	Calgary, Alberta	26	WestJet
6	Deer Lake, Newfoundland and Labrador	14	Air Canada, Porter
7	Edmonton, Alberta	13	WestJet
8	Vancouver, British Columbia	11	Air Canada, WestJet
8	Winnipeg, Manitoba	11	WestJet
10	Toronto–Billy Bishop, Ontario	7	Porter

Busiest international destinations from YHZ (2024)
Rank	Airport	Passengers	Carriers
1	London–Heathrow, United Kingdom (LHR)	88,869	Air Canada
2	New York-Newark, New Jersey	84,446	Air Canada, United
3	Frankfurt, Germany	79,647	Discover
4	Orlando, Florida	56,324	Air Canada, Air Transat, Porter, WestJet
5	New York–LaGuardia, New York	45,893	American, Delta
6	Philadelphia, Pennsylvania	33,984	American
7	Boston, Massachusetts	31,957	Air Canada, American
8	London–Gatwick, United Kingdom	23,836	WestJet
9	Cancún, Mexico	20,612	Air Canada, Air Transat, WestJet
10	Tampa, Florida	15,136	Air Canada, Porter

== Accidents and incidents ==
- On March 17, 1965, Eastern Provincial Airways Flight 102, a Handley Dart Herald bound for Sydney, NS, crashed in Upper Musquodoboit, about 15 minutes after taking off from Halifax. While climbing, the aircraft broke apart due to corrosion. The three crew members and five passengers on board were all killed.
- On December 18, 1979, a Piper Navajo light plane working a courier service crashed at Halifax airport, killing two and destroying many documents detailing transactions from 59 banks in Prince Edward Island and Cape Breton.
- On July 17, 1987, a four-seat Bell 206 helicopter operated by Versatile Air Services crashed next to Highway 102 near the airport. Two were injured and the aircraft was destroyed.
- On the night of September 2, 1998, Swissair Flight 111, a scheduled flight from New York City to Geneva, declared a pan-pan after the crew noticed smoke in the cockpit. The flight crew attempted to divert to Halifax after dumping fuel, but crashed into the sea at the entrance of St. Margarets Bay, Nova Scotia, about 60 km from the airport. All 229 passengers and crew were killed.
- On October 14, 2004, MK Airlines Flight 1602, a Boeing 747-200F, crashed during takeoff from runway 23. All seven crew members died.
- On March 29, 2015, Air Canada Flight 624 crashed while attempting to land at the airport, shortly after midnight in stormy weather. All 137 passengers and crew survived. The crash cut power to the airport and damaged runway 05's antenna array. The aircraft was destroyed.

== Ground transport ==
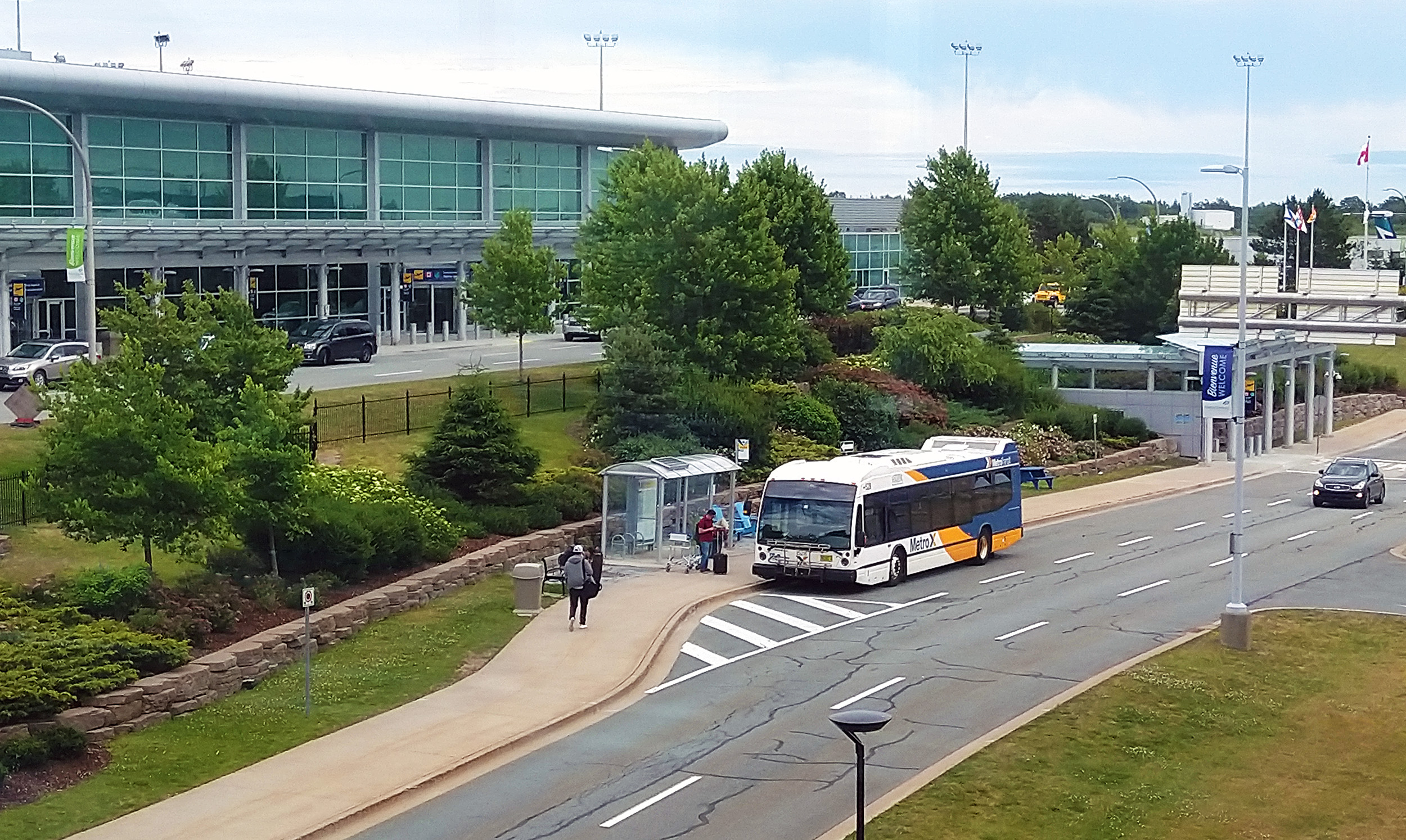
MetroX bus destined for downtown

=== Bus ===
MetroX route 320 is an express bus service that travels between the city centre and the airport, with intermediate stops at the Dartmouth Bridge Terminal and the suburb of Fall River. The route is operated by Halifax Transit (formerly Metro Transit) and runs all day on both weekdays and weekends.

=== Car ===
The airport is located at Exit 6 of Highway 102, which connects Halifax to the Trans-Canada Highway. It is a 28-minute drive from Halifax City Hall, the centre of Downtown Halifax. There are numerous car rental agencies located in the lower level of the airport car park. The airport is also reachable by using route 212

Aside from the parking garage connected to the terminal, the airport also offers Park 'N Fly Airport Parking, a long-term parking service, the brand name licensed to the airport by Hong Kong company CK Hutchison Holdings.

== See also ==
- Atlantic Canada Aviation Museum – located nearby, offering both military and civil aviation exhibits
- List of airports in Nova Scotia
