= Park 'N Fly Airport Parking =

Airport parking operator in Canada

Park 'N Fly Canada Airport Parking
- Company type: Subsidiary
- Industry: Parking
- Headquarters: 5905 Campus Road, Mississauga, Ontario
- Area served: Canada
- Key people: Carlo Marrello, CEO
- Owner: CK Hutchison Holdings
- Website: www.parknfly.ca

Park'N Fly Airport Parking, also known as Park'N Fly, is a Canadian airport parking operator based in Mississauga, Ontario. It is the largest and only national operator for off-airport car parks in Canada. Park'N Fly is currently owned by CK Hutchison Holdings, a conglomerate in Hong Kong.

== History ==
Park'N Fly began its business operations in Canada. It is the largest Canadian operator of off-airport car parks, providing 22,400 car parking spaces over 180 acres of land.

In May 2014, Park'N Fly was acquired by two subsidiaries of Hutchison Whampoa. The joint venture allocated ownership between Cheung Kong Holdings and Cheung Kong Infrastructure, both controlled by Hong Kong business magnate Li Ka-shing. As part of the agreement, each party holds a 50% interest in the assets of Park'N Fly. This agreement also included the licensing rights of its brand name to Halifax International Airport Authority, which started since 2005. The transaction was estimated to be worth $397.5 million in Canadian currency ($366 million US). Prior to the acquisition, Park'N Fly was previously owned by BRL Realty, RNE Realty and Park'N Fly Partnership.

The acquisition was officially finalized in July 2014. Subsequently, Carlo Marrello became the new CEO of Park'N Fly.

== Locations ==
Park'N Fly offers economy, self-park and valet parking services at seven major airports in Canada, including the cities of Vancouver, Edmonton, Winnipeg, Toronto, Ottawa, Montreal and Halifax. All parking locations are offsite and near the major international airports in Canada.

- Vancouver International Airport
- Edmonton International Airport
- Winnipeg International Airport
- Toronto Pearson International Airport
- Ottawa International Airport
- Montréal–Pierre Elliott Trudeau International Airport
- Halifax Stanfield International Airport
