= HIAA =

HIAA may refer to:

- Health Insurance Association of America
- Halifax International Airport Authority, a Canadian airport authority charged with operating Halifax Stanfield International Airport on behalf of Transport Canada
- 5-Hydroxyindoleacetic acid (5-HIAA), a metabolite of serotonin used to diagnose carcinoid tumors
