= Westmount Subdivision =

Coordinates: 44°38′48.86″N 63°36′33.69″W

- Subdivision
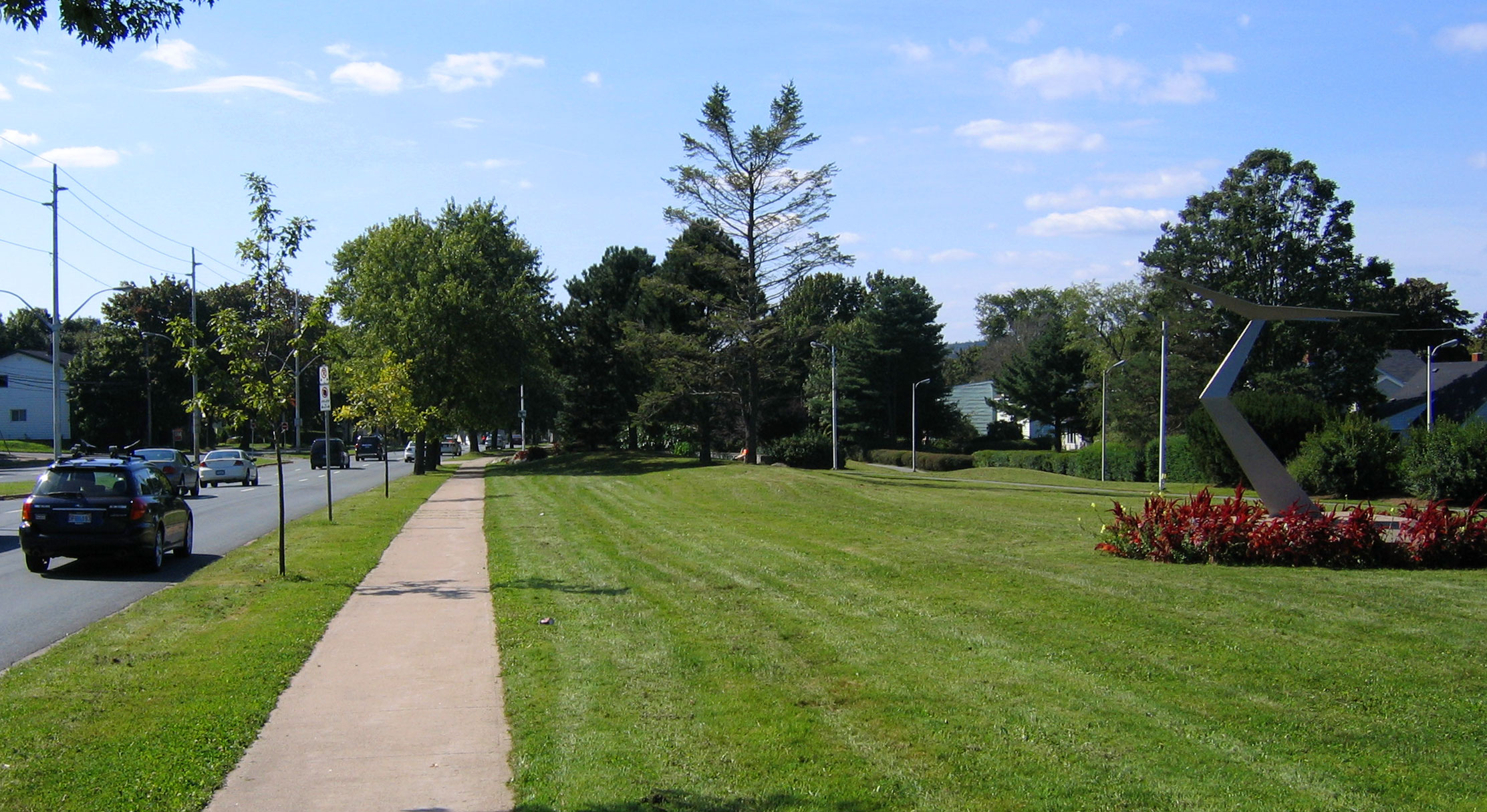
- Chebucto Road forms part of the boundary of Westmount Subdivision in west end Halifax, Nova Scotia.
- Interactive map of Westmount Subdivision
- Country: Canada
- Province: Nova Scotia
- Municipality: Halifax Regional Municipality
- Community: Halifax
- Community council: Halifax and West
- Municipal District: 9 - Halifax West Armdale

Westmount Subdivision is a neighbourhood in Halifax Regional Municipality.

== History ==
In 1931 the Halifax Municipal Airport was built on the site of the future neighbourhood. Pan American Airways operated at the airport, running a route between Halifax and Boston until the outbreak of World War II when the airport was closed and operations shifted to Naval Air Station Halifax (Shearwater). During the war, military supplies were stored on the field.

After World War II, the federal government turned over the land to the then City of Halifax. In March 1948, construction began on Westmount Subdivision. A total of 305 detached units were built using just 4 house designs. The first chance given to buy the homes were to World War II veterans. It has an unusual design inspired by New Jersey's Radburn, of which a local newspaper said, "service streets wind along the rear lot lines and all houses will face on spacious park strips where children can play in safety, far removed from traffic lanes."

Saunders Park was created from part of the former airport land, named after Wing Commander Donald W. Saunders who was a pioneer in the development of aviation in Halifax.
