= Paces Lake =

Lake in Halifax County, Canada

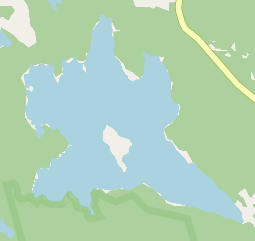
- Map of Paces Lake
- Interactive map of Paces Lake
- Location: Halifax County
- Coordinates: 44°48′57″N 63°12′49″W
- Basin countries: Canada
- Max. length: 2.38 kilometres (1.48 mi)
- Max. width: 1.35 kilometres (0.84 mi)
- Surface area: 372 hectares (920 acres)

Paces Lake is a glacial lake in Halifax County, Nova Scotia, Canada. It has an associated provincial park named Paces Lake Provincial Park, which is measured 399.36 hectares (986.8 acres) in area. It is measured 35.2 kilometres (21.9 mi) from Halifax and 64.1 kilometres (39.8 mi) from Truro. The lake is near Musquodoboit Harbour.

== Geography ==
Paces Lake contains three named islands, namely Firebrand Island, Spark Island, and Ember Island. It also has a cove, named Innis Cove. The lake is connected to Scots Lake by a small stream named Little River. The lake area is measured 372 hectares (920 acres) in area, 2.38 kilometres (1.48 mi) in length, and 1.35 kilometres (0.84 mi) in width. Near lakes around Paces Lake include Bear Lake, Farquhars Lake, Sugar Camp Lake, Caribou Lake, and Long Bridge Lake.

=== Hydrology ===
Paces Lake drains into Scots Lake via Little River, forming part of a local freshwater drainage system in central Nova Scotia. The lake is supplied primarily by surface runoff and small inflows typical of glacial lakes in the region.

== Musquodoboit Harbour/Paces Lake Water Aerodrome ==
Paces Lake is a private site of a water aerodrome used for seaplane operations. The facility, known as the Musquodoboit Harbour/Paces Lake Water Aerodrome, supports general aviation seaplane activity in the surrounding area. The registered aerodrome is listed in aviation databases and is recognized as a public water aerodrome serving in the Eastern Shore. The elevation of the seaplane base is 57 feet (17 m). It is operated by Les Boutiller and serves the Musquodoboit Harbour Area. Its Transport Canada Location Identifier code is CPL5.

== Route ==
Paces Lake is accessible by road via Nova Scotia Route 357 and Nova Scotia Highway 7, which provide regional access to the lake and the surrounding parklands.

== See also ==
- List of lakes of Nova Scotia
- List of airports in Nova Scotia
- Tangier Grand Lake Wilderness Area
