= Saunders Park (Nova Scotia) =

Urban park in Halifax

Coordinates: 44°38′45.2″N 63°36′40″W

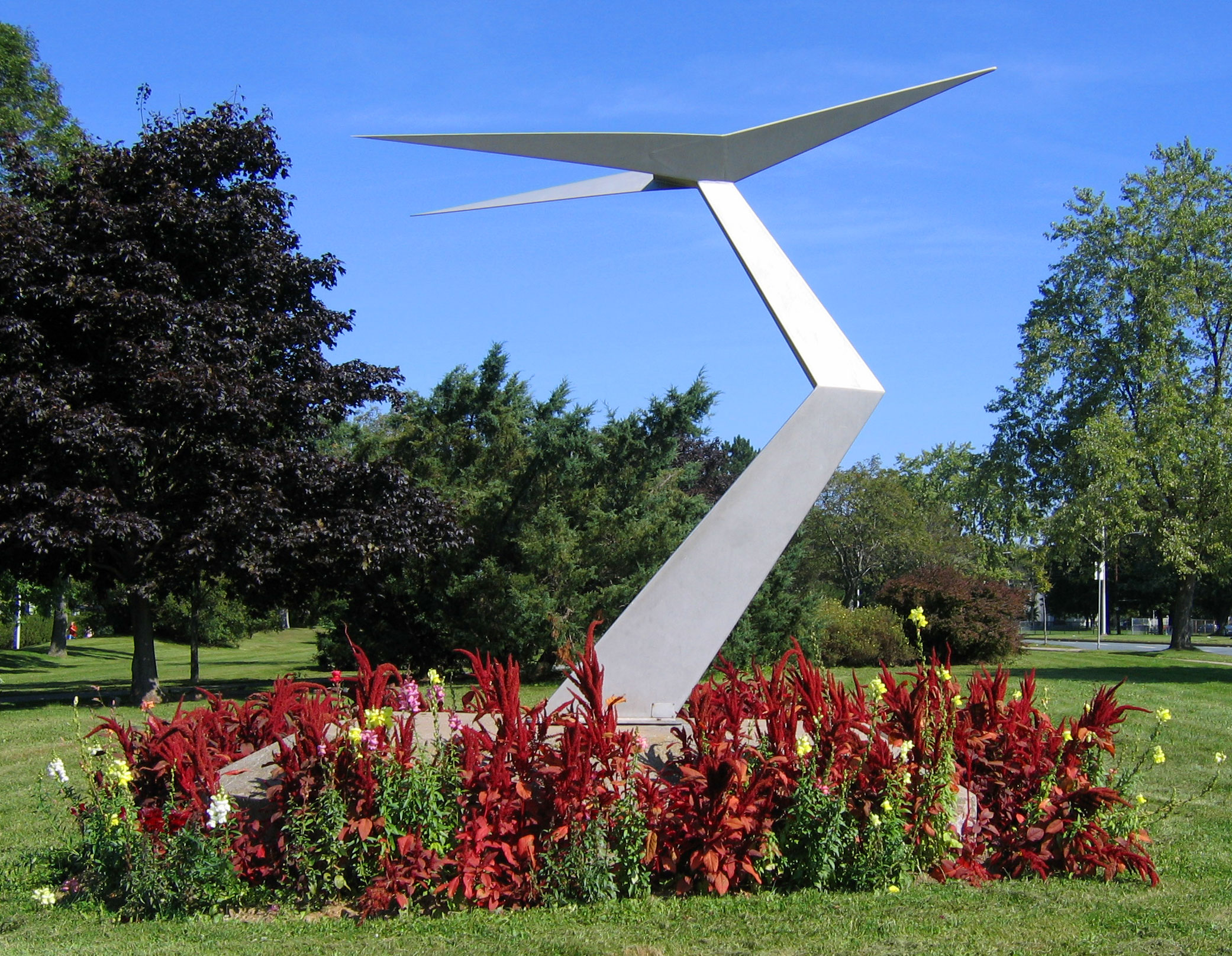
- Saunders Park memorial sculpture
- Interactive map of Saunders Park
- Type: Public park
- Location: Halifax, Nova Scotia
- Operator: City of Halifax

Saunders Park is an urban park in Halifax, Nova Scotia, Canada. It is located in West End, Halifax on Chebucto Road at the site of the now defunct Halifax Civic Airport (on west side of Connaught Avenue between Bayers Road and Chebucto Road), the city's first aerodrome built on the former Bluebell Farm in 1931. The airfield had two grass airstrips, initially at 1800 x 600 feet and 2000 x 600 feet and extended by 200 and 250 respectively in 1938. It operated until 1941 when the land was converted to an army base and civil airport operations were moved to Dartmouth Airport (now CFB Shearwater) and then to Halifax International Airport in 1960. The hangars and terminal building were located near the present day park along Connaught Avenue. The park serves the neighbourhood of Westmount.

The park is named after Donald Saunders whose contribution to aviation in Halifax is explained on a plaque under the memorial sculpture in the park:

"This park was created for the citizens of Halifax and is named Saunders Park to commemorate the life work of a pioneer in Canadian aviation. Wing Commander Donald W. Saunders was associated with the development of aviation in the Halifax area for many years. He was instructor to the Halifax Flying Club from 1928 to 1937, served with the Royal Flying Corps in the War of 1914-1918 and with the Royal Canadian Air Force in World War II. From 1931-1937 Wing Commander Saunders was Manager of the Halifax Municipal Airport. This park is located on a portion of the old airport. During the War of 1939-1945 this area was occupied by Military District Number Six Depot, Canadian Army."

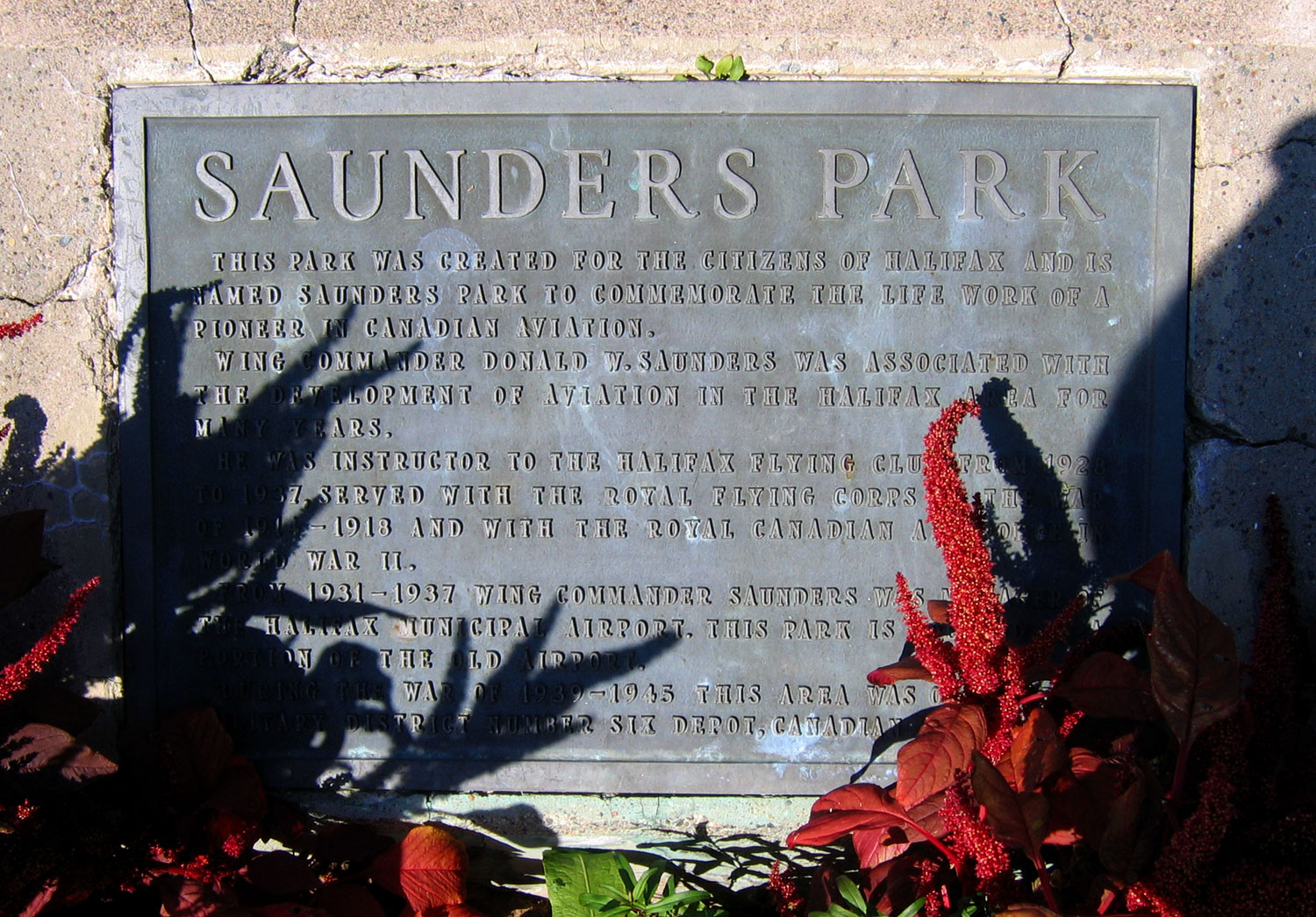
Plaque at Saunders Park

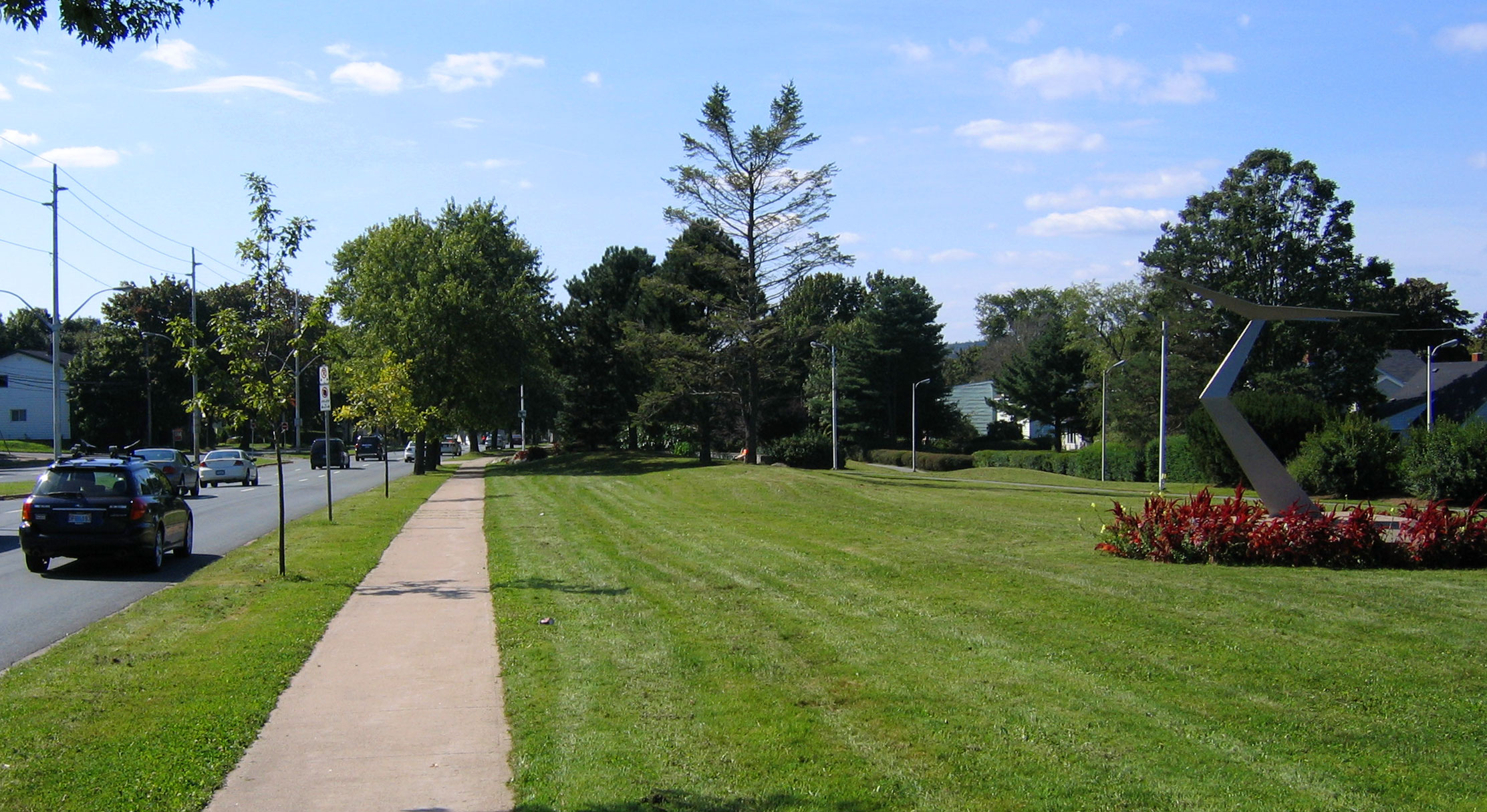
Saunders Park, showing today's roads and housing
