= Amherst Airport =

Former airfield in Amherst, Nova Scotia

- IATA: none; ICAO: none; TC LID: ~~CCQ4~~

Summary
- Airport type: ~~Private~~
- Operator: ~~M. Logan~~
- Location: Amherst, Nova Scotia
- Time zone: AST (UTC−04:00)
  - Summer (DST): ADT (UTC−03:00)
- Elevation AMSL: 80 ft (24 m)
- Coordinates: 45°48′49″N 064°14′09″W

Map
- Location in Nova Scotia

Runways
Direction	Length		Surface
Direction	ft	m	Surface
~~08/26~~	~~2,000~~	~~610~~	~~Turf~~
- Source: Canada Flight Supplement

Amherst Airport ~~(TC LID: CCQ4)~~ is an abandoned airport that was located 1 NM (1.9 km; 1.2 mi) west of Amherst, Nova Scotia, Canada. It was a small turf airstrip, located perpendicular to Highway 104 opposite the Amherst Industrial Park.

== History ==
=== Aerodrome ===
In approximately 1942 a Department of Transport Aerodrome was listed at 45°49′N 64°13′W with a Var. 24 degrees W and elevation of 75 feet (23 m). The field was listed as "turf" and had one runway listed as follows:

Runway name	Length	Width	Surface
8/26	3,700 feet (1,128 m)	500 feet (152 m)	Turf

== Current ==
The airport was listed as abandoned as of 8 June 2006.
