= Edmonton Airports =

Airport authority in Alberta, Canada

Edmonton Regional Airports Authority
- Company type: Community-based, not-for-profit
- Founded: Edmonton, Alberta, 1990; 36 years ago
- Headquarters: Edmonton International Airport, Leduc County, Alberta, Canada
- Number of locations: 2
- Area served: Edmonton Metropolitan Region
- Key people: Naseem Bashir (Board Chair); Myron Keehn (President & CEO)
- Services: Airport operator
- Owner: Community-based
- Number of employees: 4,000+ (2011)
- Website: corporate.flyeia.com

Edmonton Airports, officially the Edmonton Regional Airports Authority, is an airport authority responsible for the management and operation of two airports in the Edmonton area. Established in 1990, following the Regional Airports Authorities Act passed by the Legislative Assembly of Alberta, It is a non-profit organisation and, as per the act, has no shareholders and does not pay dividends.

The authority is governed by a 15-member board of directors appointed to represent the various municipalities and the Government of Canada (2 members). These municipalities include the cities of Edmonton (six members), Leduc (one member), Leduc County (one member), Parkland County (one member), Strathcona County (one member) and Sturgeon County (one member). The board also appoints two members at-large.

== Operations ==
Edmonton Airports operates the Edmonton International Airport (EIA) and the Edmonton/Villeneuve Airport. The EIA is owned by Transport Canada, leased by Edmonton Airports, and part of the National Airports System. It includes a planned inland port logistics support facility in support of the Port Alberta initiative. The Villeneuve Airport is owned by Edmonton Airports.

== See also ==
- Greater Toronto Airports Authority and Toronto Port Authority
- Calgary Airport Authority
- Regina Airport Authority
- Vancouver Airport Services
- Halifax International Airport Authority
