= West End, Halifax =

Coordinates: 44°39′0.03″N 63°37′16.64″W

West End
- Neighborhood
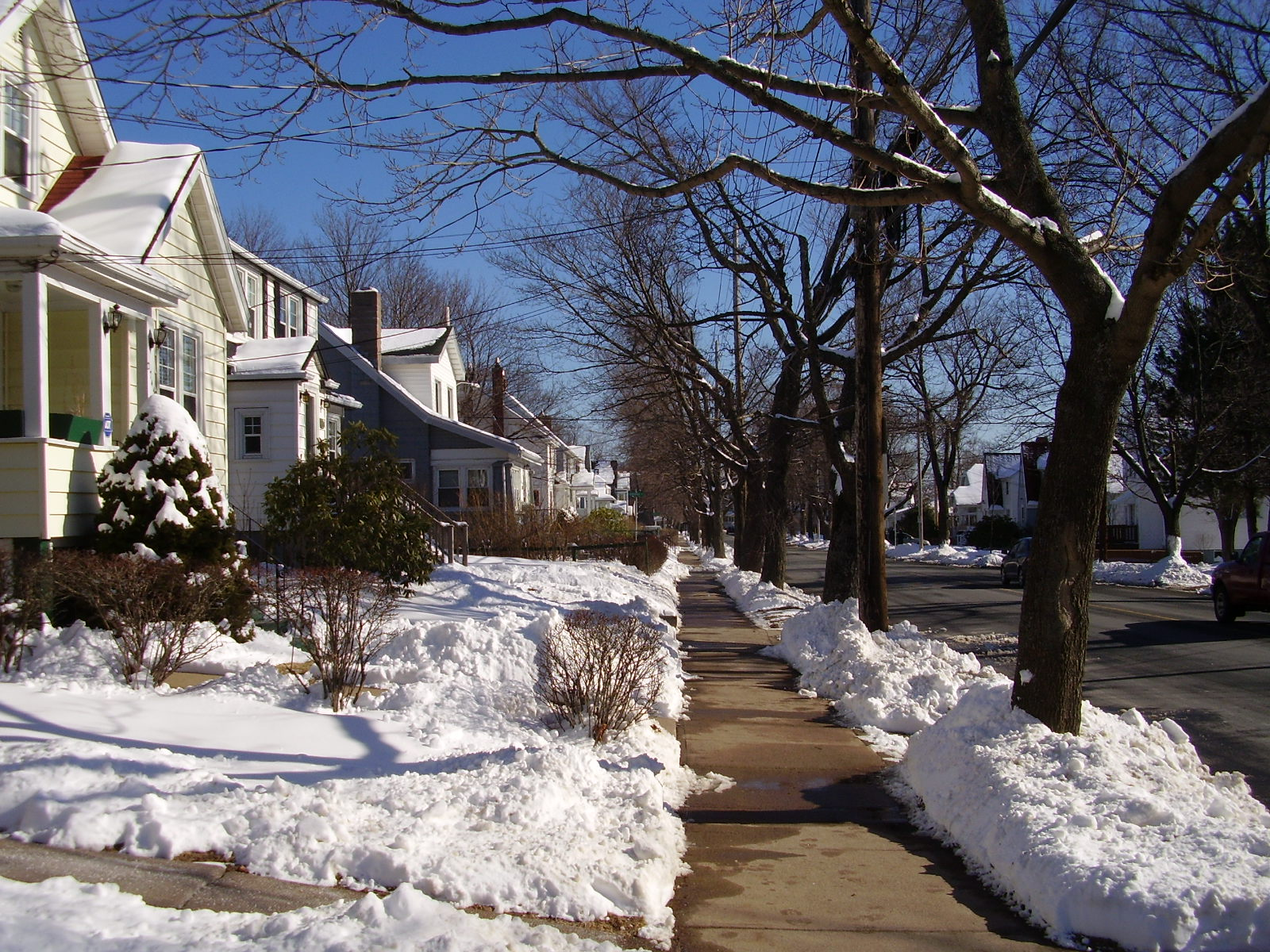
- Oxford Street, a typical West End street
- Interactive map of West End
- Country: Canada
- Province: Nova Scotia
- Municipality: Halifax Regional Municipality
- Community: Halifax
- Community council: Halifax and West
- Municipal District: Halifax West Armdale
- Area Codes: 782, 902

The West End is a neighbourhood of Halifax Regional Municipality in the Canadian province of Nova Scotia, located on the western half of the Halifax Peninsula. The West End is predominantly middle class with many blocks of tree-lined older residential streets. However, it is also home to many students and small low rent units. Rising real estate prices have also led to some levels of gentrification.

== Boundaries ==
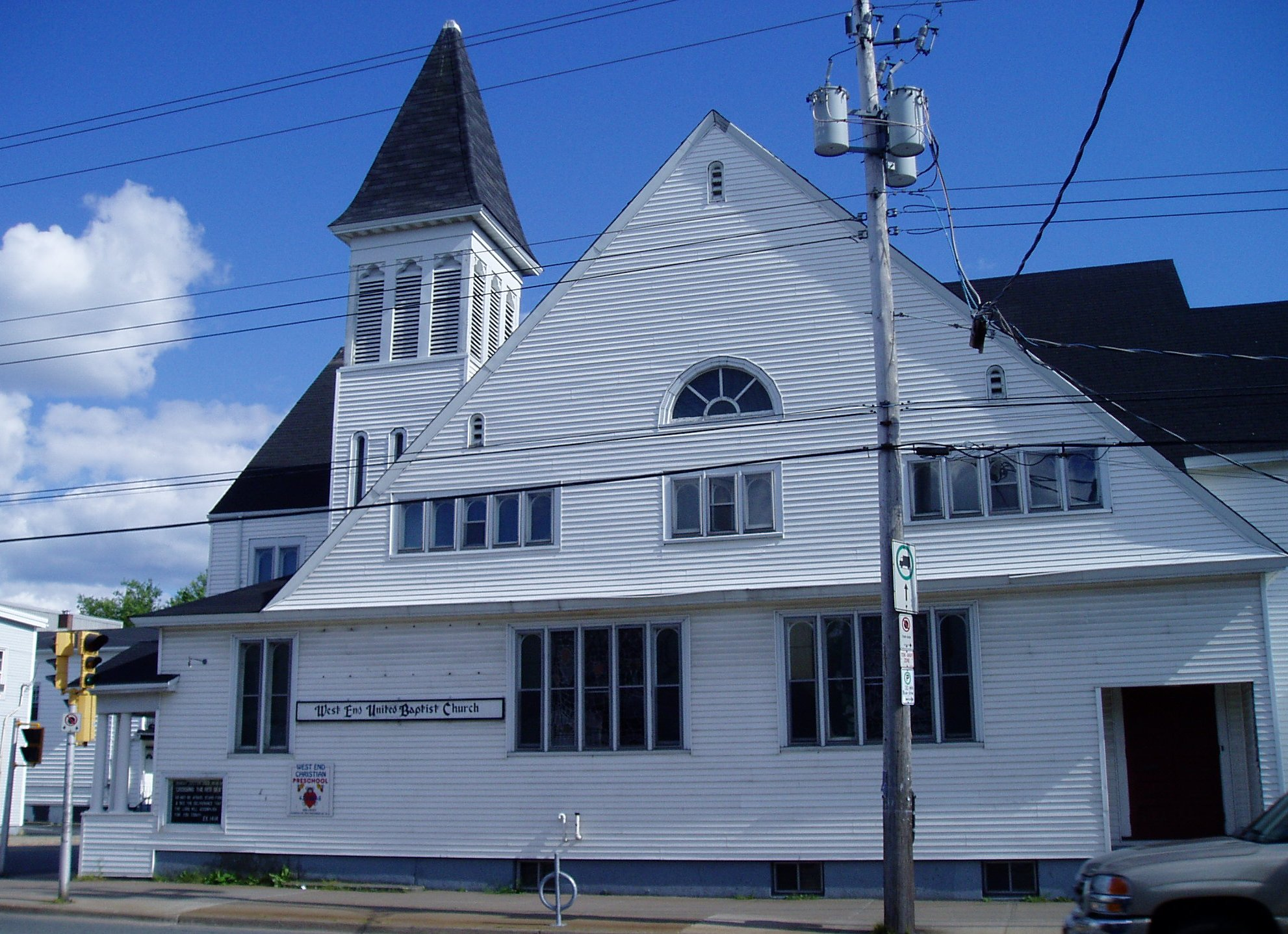
West End United Baptist Church on Quinpool Road

The border between the West and South End's of Halifax has crept north as the southern section has gentrified. While Jubilee Road has long been considered as the southern boundary, some now regard Quinpool Road as the area's southern edge. Quinpool is generally considered the heart of the West End, and site of such landmarks as the West End Baptist Church, the Oxford Theatre and a diverse array of small businesses. The northern boundary is also subject to interpretation but is widely regarded as Kempt Road and Windsor Street. The western boundary between the West End and Mainland Halifax is generally considered to run from the Northwest Arm and northward along Dutch Village Road and Joseph Howe Drive. The neighbourhood is defined municipally by District 14 Connaught-Quinpool and provincially as the Constituency of Halifax Chebucto.

== History ==
For the first century and a half of Halifax's history, the area of the West End was occupied by small farms and country estates. It was developed in the 1870s as residential streets were laid out. The growth of streetcar lines accelerated development. Chebucto School was built in 1912 to serve the expanding neighbourhood and the building served as a morgue for the Halifax Explosion as it was close to the north end but relatively undamaged.

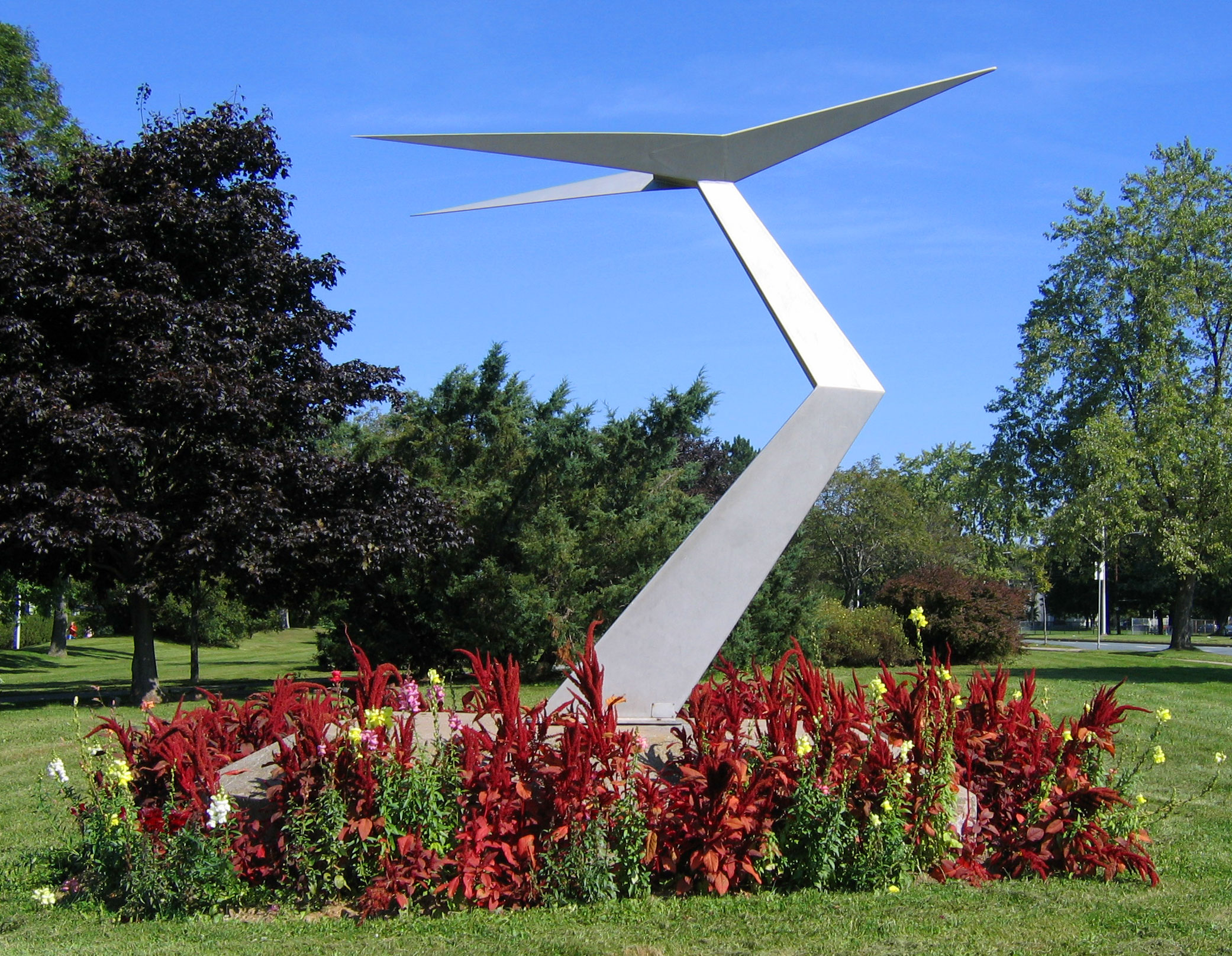
Saunders Park Monument, the site of Chebucto Field airport

In 1931, "Bluebell Farm" between Chebucto and Bayers Road was converted to Chebucto Field, the first airport in Halifax with terminal buildings near Connaught and Chebucto Road. Today the air field location is marked by Saunders Park. Simpsons built a large department store in the West end in the 1930s, the first retail centre outside the downtown. The large remaining open areas of the West End filled with housing after World War II with many blocks of Victory Houses and 1950s suburban homes. The West End was severely affected by Hurricane Juan in 2003 as the high density of large, older trees in the neighbourhood resulted in many toppled trees, damaged houses, blocked streets and prolonged power outages. A major controversy in 2008 was a project to widen Chebucto Road. Opponents argued it would increase traffic volume, noise and waste two million dollars better spent on public transit, while supporters argued it would reduce commuting times and congestion in the expanding municipality. Despite a widespread protest by environmentalists and West End residents, and after some consultation with residents and a public information campaign, the widening went ahead, albeit slightly altered in that it did not require the demolition of a house originally set to be destroyed.
