= Scots Lake =

Glacial lake in Nova Scotia

- Interactive map of Scots Lake
- Location: Halifax County
- Coordinates: 44°47′29″N 63°10′50″W
- Basin countries: Canada
- Max. length: 1,843 metres (6,047 ft)
- Max. width: 811.47 metres (2,662.3 ft)
- Surface area: 75.8 hectares (187 acres)

Scots Lake is a glacial lake in Halifax County, Nova Scotia, Canada. It has an associated pond named Scots Pond. It is measured approximately 35.82 kilometres (22.26 mi) from Halifax and 64.45 kilometres (40.05 mi) from Truro. The lake is near Musquodoboit Harbour.

== Geography ==
Scots Lake has no islands. The lake is connected to Paces Lake by a small stream named Little River. The lake is measured 75.8 hectares (187 acres) in area, 811.47 metres (2,662.3 ft) in width, and 1,843 metres (6,047 ft) in length. Near lakes around Paces Lake include Long bridge Lake, Petpeswick Lake, Musquodoboit Lake, Church Lake, Duck Lake, and Granite Lake.

== Musquodoboit Harbour/Scots Lake Water Aerodrome ==
Scots Lake is a private site of a water aerodrome used for seaplane operations. The facility, Musquodoboit Harbour/Scots Lake Water Aerodrome supports general aviation seaplane activity in the surrounding area. The registered aerodrome is listed in aviation databases and is recognized as a public water aerodrome serving in the Eastern Shore. Its elevation is 46 feet (14 m), and operated by Don Whitton. Its Transport Canada Location Identifier code is CSL2.

== Route ==
Scots Lake can be accessed via Nova Scotia Route 7 and Nova Scotia Route 357, which provide regional access to the lake and the surrounding parklands.

== See also ==
- List of lakes of Nova Scotia
- List of airports in Nova Scotia
- Nova Scotia Route 207
