= Vantage Group =

Airport management company

- Founded: Vancouver, British Columbia, Canada (1994)
- Headquarters: Vancouver, British Columbia, Canada
- Number of locations: 13 airports
- Key people: George H. Casey; CEO and Chair
- Services: Airport manager, investor and developer
- Subsidiaries: North Peace Airport Services Limited; Tradeport International Corporation; Kamloops Airport Limited; Vantage Airport Group (New York)
- Website: vantagegroup.com

Vantage Group (or Vantage, formerly known as Vantage Airport Group, and/or Vancouver Airport Services or YVRAS) is an airport management, development and investment company with 13 airports in Canada, the United States, Cyprus, The Bahamas and Jamaica.

== History ==
Vantage Group (Vantage), formerly known as Vantage Airport Group, was formed in 1994 as Vancouver Airport Services (YVRAS), a subsidiary of Vancouver Airport Authority. Vancouver Airport Authority and Vantage Group have a strategic partnership agreement that allows for the sharing of best practices and expertise. YVRAS was part of a consortium that was going to privatize Midway Airport in Chicago. In April 2009 the deal fell through.

Vantage led the LaGuardia Gateway Partners consortium bid to operate and redevelop LaGuardia Airport's Terminal B. On May 28, 2015, the Port Authority of New York and New Jersey voted to move forward on the Central Terminal Building Redevelopment Project, announcing LaGuardia Gateway Partners as preferred proposer.

On June 1, 2016, LaGuardia Gateway Partners assumed the lease of Terminal B, commencing a $5.1B terminal redevelopment plan, the largest aviation infrastructure P3 in the U.S.

In March 2018, Vantage and RXR Realty were selected by JetBlue Airways as the preferred development partner for the airline's terminals at John F. Kennedy International Airport (JFK).

Vantage is wholly owned by Corsair Capital Infrastructure Partners. On February 4, 2019, Corsair announced the closing of a fundraising initiative for Vantage.

JetBlue Technology Ventures announced on April 25, 2019, that Vantage had joined its International Partnership Program to scout new startups and technologies to improve the travel experience.

== Airports ==
Vantage provides management services to various airports owned by Vantage or via a consortium:

- United States
  - Green Bay–Austin Straubel International Airport, Wisconsin
    - responsible for operations, airport itself is publicly owned
  - LaGuardia Airport, Queens, New York
    - responsible for operations and redevelopment of Terminal B
- Midway Partnership, Midway Airport, Chicago
  - a consortium (composed of Vantage, SSP America, Hudson Group) responsible for operations and redevelopment of Midway's concessions program
- Canada
  - North Peace Regional Airport, Fort St. John, British Columbia
    - owned via North Peace Airport Services Limited
  - John C. Munro Hamilton International Airport, Hamilton, Ontario
    - acquired through purchase of Tradeport International Corporation 2007
  - Kamloops Airport, Kamloops, British Columbia
    - owned via Kamloops Airport Limited
  - Greater Moncton Romeo LeBlanc International Airport, Moncton, New Brunswick
- Caribbean
  - Sangster International Airport, Montego Bay, Jamaica
    - Leading stakeholder of the operating consortium, MBJ Airports Ltd (25.5% stake), Abertis is also a partner.
  - Lynden Pindling International Airport, Nassau, The Bahamas
- Europe
  - Larnaka International Airport, Cyprus
  - Paphos International Airport, Cyprus

In 2006 the then Vancouver Airport Services was part of a French-led group, Hermes Airports, that won a tender to upgrade Larnaca International Airport and Paphos International Airport.

== See also ==
- Vancouver International Airport
- Greater Toronto Airports Authority and Toronto Port Authority
- Regina Airport Authority
- Edmonton Airports
- Halifax International Airport Authority
