= Regina International Airport =

Airport in Saskatchewan, Canada

Regina Regional Airport

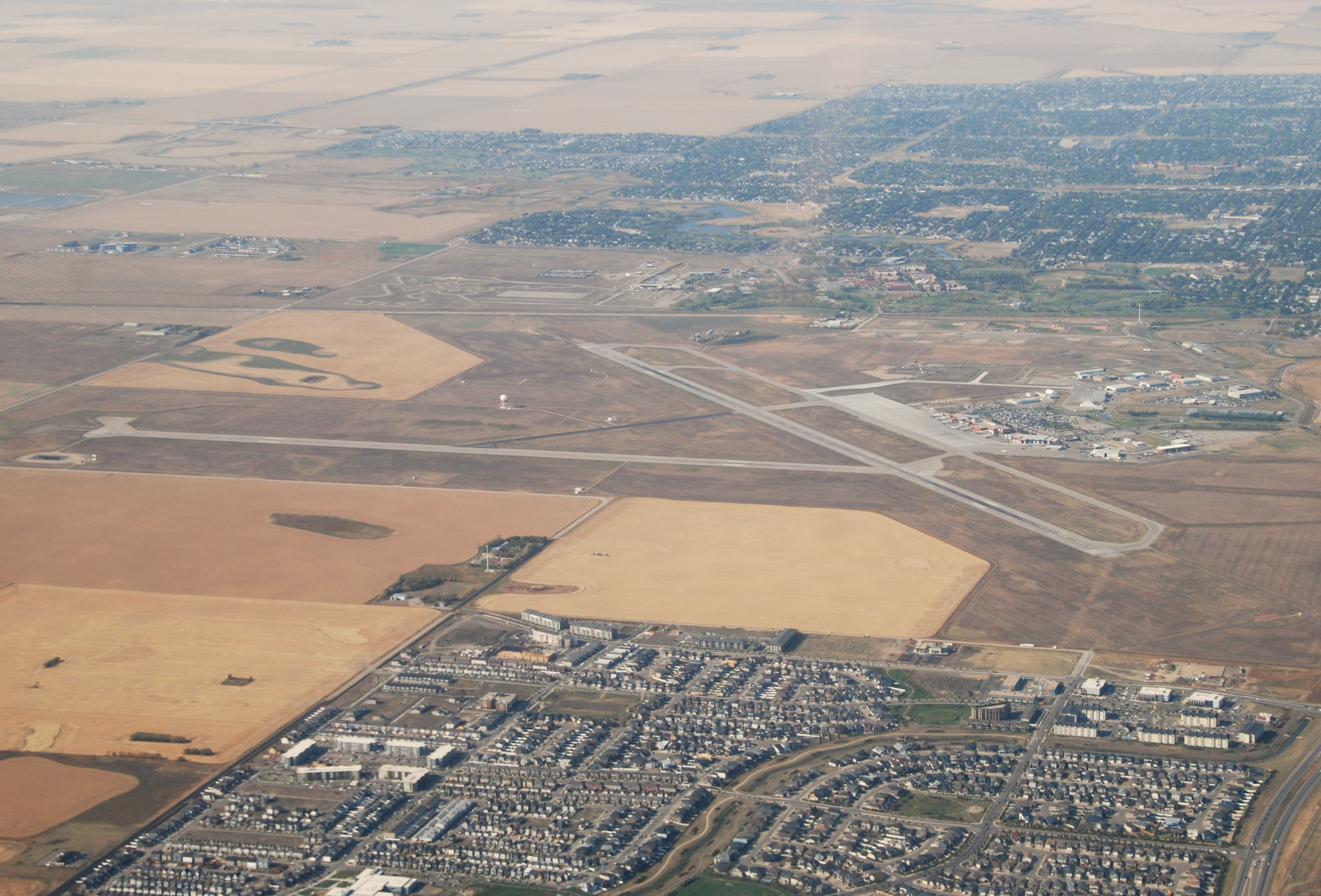
- IATA: YQR; ICAO: CYQR; WMO: 71863

Summary
- Airport type: Public
- Owner: Transport Canada
- Operator: Regina Airport Authority
- Serves: Regina, Saskatchewan
- Time zone: CST (UTC−06:00)
- Elevation AMSL: 1,895 ft (578 m)
- Coordinates: 50°25′56″N 104°39′58″W
- Public transit access: Regina Transit 24
- Website: www.yqr.ca

Map
- Location in Saskatchewan CYQR (Canada)

Runways
Direction	Length		Surface
Direction	ft	m	Surface
08/26	6,200	1,890	Asphalt
13/31	7,901	2,408	Asphalt

Statistics (2024)
- Total Passengers: 1,082,450
- Sources: Canada Flight Supplement; Environment Canada; Transport Canada; Movements from Statistics Canada; Passenger statistics from Regina Airport Authority

Regina International Airport (IATA: YQR, ICAO: CYQR) is an airport (Note: Although named an international airport, Regina International Airport is not classified as an international airport by Transport Canada) located in Regina, Saskatchewan, Canada, located 2 nautical miles (3.7 km; 2.3 mi) south-west and 7 kilometres (4.3 mi) west-southwest of the city centre. It is run by the Regina Airport Authority. In 2024, it was the 15th busiest airport in Canada.

The airport is classified as an airport of entry by Nav Canada and is staffed by the Canada Border Services Agency (CBSA). CBSA officers at this airport can handle aircraft with no more than 200 passengers. However, they can handle up to 300 passengers if the aircraft is unloaded in stages.

== History ==
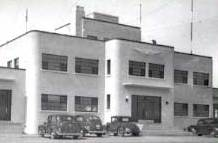
The 1939 Art Deco administration building and control tower at the Regina Municipal Airport

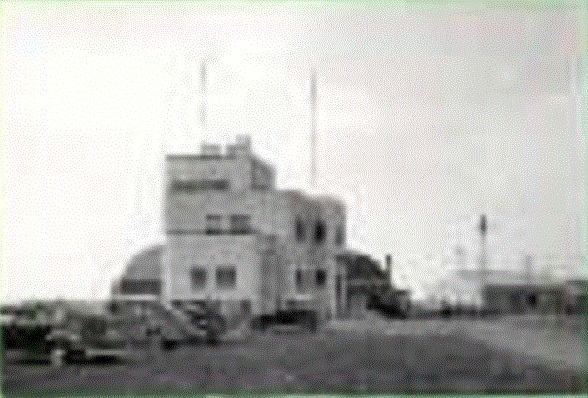
The Department of Transport-built administration building and control tower at the Regina Municipal Airport

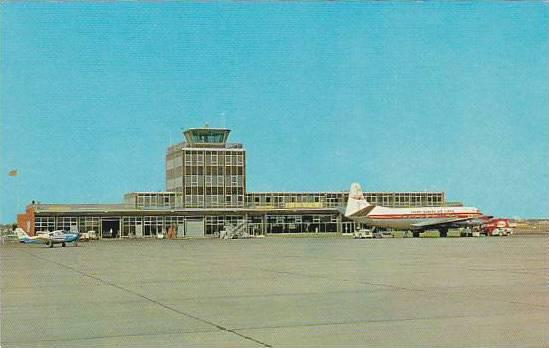
The second Regina airport, in the mid-1960s prior to the enlargement and renovations of 1983-86

=== Early aviation (1911–28) ===
The first site in Regina used for flying was the infield at Regina Exhibition Park's horse race track, where visiting barnstormer "Lucky Bob" St. Pierre (a Nebraskan whose real name was "Shaeffer" or "Shaffer") flew a Curtiss Model D biplane in August, 1911. A few other barnstormers, notably aviator Katherine Stinson of the famous aviation family, appeared in Regina and other prairie cities in the years thereafter, but there was virtually no other aviation activity in Western Canada during the First World War.

After the First World War, Reginan Roland Groome returned from military service as a flying instructor in Southern Ontario and, with partners, set up a company called the "Aerial Service Co." Its primitive airfield was located near what is the current intersection of Hill Avenue and Cameron Street in the city's southern Lakeview district. In May 1920, federal government regulators assigned this field the designation of Canada's first licensed "air harbour". Groome also received Canadian commercial pilot's licence No. 1 and mechanic Robert McCombie was given air engineer's licence No. 1.

=== Current site (1928–39) ===
The airport site was developed from 1928 to 1930. A terminal building was built in 1940. Scheduled airline service was initially provided by Moose Jaw-based Prairie Airways (in 1938) and then Trans-Canada Air Lines (in 1939).

=== World War II (1939–45) ===
In the beginning of the war, the Regina Flying Club was heavily involved in the contract training for the Royal Canadian Air Force (RCAF). The majority of this training was conducted out of the Regina Municipal Airport. The implementation of the British Commonwealth Air Training Plan in the early 1940s resulted in the formation of No. 15 Elementary Flying Training School (EFTS) and RCAF Station Regina at the Airport on November 11, 1940. The School was managed by the Regina Flying Club and was in operation at the site until it was closed on August 11, 1944. From November 1–30, 1945 the former 15 EFTS facilities at the airport were used as a release centre for Airmen leaving the service.

==== Aerodrome ====
Around 1942, the airport was listed as RCAF & D of T Aerodrome - Regina, Saskatchewan at 50°26′N 104°39′W with a variation of 17 degrees east and elevation of 1,885 ft (575 m). Three runways were listed as follows:

Runway name	Length	Width	Surface
3/21	3,300 ft (1,000 m)	150 ft (46 m)	Hard surfaced
12/30	3,725 ft (1,135 m)	150 ft (46 m)	Hard surfaced
7/25	3,725 ft (1,135 m)	150 ft (46 m)	Hard surfaced

=== Relief landing field – Brora ===
The primary relief landing field (R1) for RCAF Station Regina during the war was located north of the city of Regina, at 50°33′46″N 104°38′57″W.

=== Post-World War II (1945–90) ===
A new terminal building was erected in 1960. Major renovations to this terminal building were conducted in 1983–86.

=== Recent history (1990–present) ===
A $24-million expansion started in January 2004, increasing its capacity to 1.2 million passengers per year. The first stage of the expansion included the expansion of the terminal and includes a larger post-security holding room, another passenger loading bridge, an expansion to the international arrivals area and more baggage carousels. The first phase was completed in August 2005.

The second phase is now under way and includes further expansion for security services and for facilities for new tenants such as stores and eating establishments (including a Tim Hortons). In 2009, construction began on two new jetways, one between gates 5 and 6, to the right of the glass atrium, and the other as an offshoot of gate 1. This is to keep up with airport demand and to further increase passenger comfort and safety in winter months.

=== Scheduled service ===
On May 1, 1995, under the Canada-US Open Skies agreement, Northwest Airlines began service to Minneapolis–Saint Paul. United Express then began non-stop service to Chicago O'Hare and Denver. In 1996 WestJet began Boeing 737-200 service. Air Canada, which began scheduled service to Regina in early 1939, ended mainline service into Regina and six other medium-sized Canadian cities in October 2005, turning over these routes to its subsidiary Air Canada Jazz and its fleet of Canadair Regional Jets (CRJ). Mainline service to Toronto returned on November 2, 2008, using the Embraer E-190 aircraft. In the summer of 2010, Air Canada Jazz introduced summer seasonal service between Regina and Ottawa using the CRJ-705 aircraft, as well late in 2013 WestJet Encore started service to Calgary using the Dash 8 Q400 aircraft. Since then, Edmonton and Winnipeg have been added to WestJet's Encore network out of Regina. Starting in the 2014 summer season, WestJet has also added two weekly flights to Las Vegas, one flight on Wednesday, and the other being on Saturday.

In late 2014, United Airlines cancelled service to Chicago, and on February 28, 2015, cancelled service to Denver. In May 2016, Delta Air Lines confirmed that service to Minneapolis would cease on July 31, 2016, ending the last year-round service from Regina to the United States.

For a short period of time in 2016, ultra low-cost carrier NewLeaf (now Flair Airlines) operated flights to and from Kelowna before suspending the service on November 1, 2016. There were then plans to continue the service.

As of 2019, the CEO of Regina Airport was in talks with multiple airlines for possible services back to the United States with a 1.55% increase in passengers in 2018.

Air Canada indefinitely suspended its routes from Regina to Winnipeg, Ottawa, and Saskatoon in June 2020 due to the financial impact of the COVID-19 pandemic in Canada.

Sunwing Airlines also indefinitely suspended routes from Regina to Sun destinations for the 2020/2021 winter season due to the impacts of the COVID-19 pandemic. No news has been announced for their return.

Service returned on August 24, 2020, to Toronto and Vancouver with Flair Airlines.

On November 15, 2021, Swoop announced that it would launch a twice-weekly service between Regina and Edmonton starting June 16, 2022.

Since the spring of 2022, Flair Air has suspended its service to Regina and has so far not announced any date for a return. Subsequently, Swoop flew their last flights to Toronto in October 2022, and would not be returning to Saskatchewan as a whole in the summer 2023 season.

Year-round service to the United States resumed on April 28, 2024 with flights to Minneapolis-St Paul.

== Passenger services ==
Passenger services at YQR are under significant renovation. In late 2013 and early 2014, Regina Airport Authority (RAA) undertook efforts to develop and execute a strategy to improve retail, food and beverage services at Regina International Airport. Services currently include a 24-hour Subway sandwich shop, Tim Hortons Express, Relay (Duty Free) and a fully renovated Rumor Handcrafts shop. In addition, post-security, there is the Air Canada Maple Leaf Lounge, a children's play area, vending machines, free Wi-Fi and a historical display located post-security. There is also a four-currency ATM just prior to security that dispenses US and Canadian dollars, euros, and British pounds.

Presently, the restaurant located on the second floor pre-security is currently closed for renovations. Post-security services for food and beverage are also under construction, a reduced menu is available in the Lounge (post security). From April 1 until October 1, 2015, YQR was working on additional and expanded food service options before and after security, expanded post-security retail services and improved lay-out in the main restaurant to improve traffic flow.

Current Air Terminal Building Food, Beverage & Retail:

- 1st Floor - Pre-security: Brioche Dorée
- 2nd Floor - Post-security: Tim Hortons (Full Menu), Skyway Grill, 360 Bistro + Bar, Relay, Air Canada Maple Leaf Lounge

== Facilities ==
The RAA Fire Department (with crew of 10) operates from a single fire station housing two Rosenbauer Panther 6x6 ARFF as well as a Rosenbauer AirWolf Rapid Intervention Vehicle in 2012.

In 2012 RAA completed renovations to the existing airport fire hall.

Ground transportation options to/from the airport include taxi, private vehicles, and Regina Transit's Route 24 Airport/Downtown, which opened in 2023.

== Airlines and destinations ==
=== Passenger ===
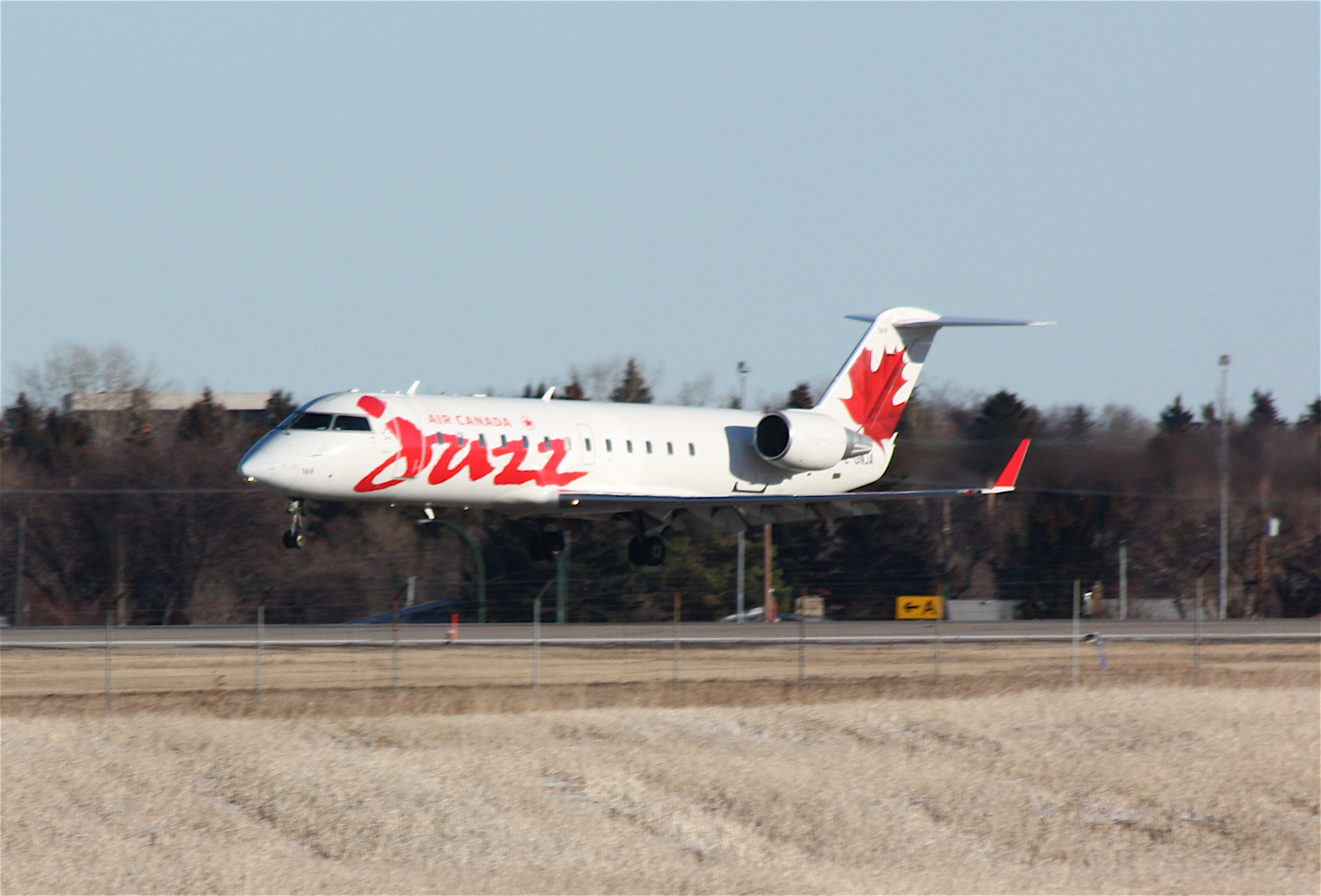
Jazz Bombardier CRJ200 landing

Airlines	Destinations
Air Canada	Toronto–Pearson, Vancouver
Air Canada Express	Vancouver; Seasonal: Montréal–Trudeau, Saskatoon
United Express	Denver
WestJet	Calgary, Toronto–Pearson; Seasonal: Cancún, Halifax, Phoenix–Sky Harbor, Puerto Vallarta, San José del Cabo (begins December 14, 2026), Vancouver
WestJet Encore	Calgary, Edmonton, Minneapolis/St. Paul, Winnipeg; Seasonal: Kelowna

=== Cargo ===
Airlines	Destinations
Cargojet Airways	Saskatoon, Winnipeg
SkyLink Express	Saskatoon, Winnipeg

== Statistics ==
=== Annual traffic ===
Traffic for Regina International Airport has mostly remained stagnant since 2013, hovering around 1,250,000 passengers annually. However, RAA saw growth of 1.55% in 2018.

Annual passenger traffic
Year	Passengers	% Change
2010	1,120,134	Steady
2011	1,141,177	▲1.9%
2012	1,185,715	▲3.9%
2013	1,227,224	▲3.5%
2014	1,262,577	▲2.9%
2015	1,255,957	▼0.5%
2016	1,262,899	▲0.5%
2017	1,219,311	▼3.4%
2018	1,238,239	▲1.55%
2019	1,163,562	▼6.0%
2020	370,364	▼68.1%
2021	355,490	▼4.0%
2022	764,128	▲114.95%
2023	981,845	▲28.49%
2024	1,082,450	▲10.25%

== See also ==
- List of airports in Saskatchewan
- Regina/Aerogate Aerodrome
