= National Airports Policy =

Program of the Government of Canada

The National Airports Policy is a program of the Government of Canada involving the privatization or private operation of nearly all of the country's airports that was commenced during the 1990s.

The policy continues to be controversial in Canada because of the greatly increased airport fees that have resulted and the ongoing inability of airports to meet infrastructure requirements. For example, the fees charged to carriers and general aviation by the Greater Toronto Airports Authority at Toronto Pearson International Airport are among the highest in the world.

The Liberal Transport Minister who oversaw the creation of the policy, Doug Young, was later quoted as saying it was the worst decision of his career and that he regretted its implementation.

Canada also privatized its air traffic control and air navigation systems, placing them under the control of a private company, Nav Canada.

== See also ==
- National Airports System
