= Halifax International Airport Authority =

- Founded: Halifax, Nova Scotia, Canada (1995)
- Headquarters: Halifax Stanfield International Airport, Goffs, Nova Scotia
- Number of locations: 1 airport
- Area served: Halifax Regional Municipality
- Key people: Peter McDonough (Chair); Joyce F. Carter, FCA (President and CEO)
- Services: Airport authority
- Revenue: $67 million (2010)
- Total assets: $73.4 million (2010)
- Number of employees: 132 full time 27 seasonal
- Website: http://www.hiaa.ca/

The Halifax International Airport Authority (HIAA) is a Canadian airport authority charged with operating Halifax Stanfield International Airport on behalf of Transport Canada.

The HIAA was established in November 1995 in advance of changes to the operation of Canadian airports by the federal government. The federal government through its Department of Transport had owned and operated the airport since its construction in 1960, however by the 1990s it was examining ways to reduce the payroll and scope of Transport Canada's activities. Beginning with changes to the Canada Transportation Act in 1995, Transport Canada began to divest the operation of sea ports and airports to non-profit authorities.

On February 1, 2000 HIAA took over management of Halifax Stanfield International Airport from Transport Canada. Transport Canada remains the owner of the airport and charges the HIAA rent, as well as establishing regulations governing airport operations.

Since then, HIAA has undertaken an aggressive construction schedule to implement long-neglected improvements to the airport infrastructure. A passenger user fee is charged on all passengers using the airport which helps to fund such improvements to runways and the passenger terminal.

== See also ==
- National Airports Policy (Canada)
- National Airports System
- Greater Toronto Airports Authority and Toronto Port Authority
- Regina Airport Authority
- Edmonton Airports
- Vancouver Airport Services
