= Regina Airport Authority =

Regina Airport Authority Incorporated
- Founded: Regina, Saskatchewan, Canada (1997)
- Headquarters: Regina International Airport
- Number of locations: 1 airport
- Area served: Southern Saskatchewan
- Key people: Trish Martynook, Chair; James Bogusz, President and CEO
- Services: Airport authority
- Website: Official website

Regina Airport Authority is a non-profit agency that oversees the management of the Regina International Airport, which serves the Canadian city of Regina and the southern part of the province of Saskatchewan.

== History ==
The Regina Airport Authority was founded in 1997 in Regina under a broader federal government policy. During the 1990s, this policy turned over the operation of major Canadian airports to locally-based bodies, whereas the Government of Canada retained ownership of the airports.

As of 2023, the Regina Airport Authority's current board chair is Trish Martynook.

== Responsibilities ==
1. Infrastructure Management
2. Safety and Security
3. Customer Experience
4. Airline and Tenant Relations
5. Financial Management

== See also ==
- Greater Toronto Airports Authority and Toronto Port Authority
- Edmonton Airports
- Vancouver Airport Services
- Halifax International Airport Authority
