= EVAS Air =

Canadian airline

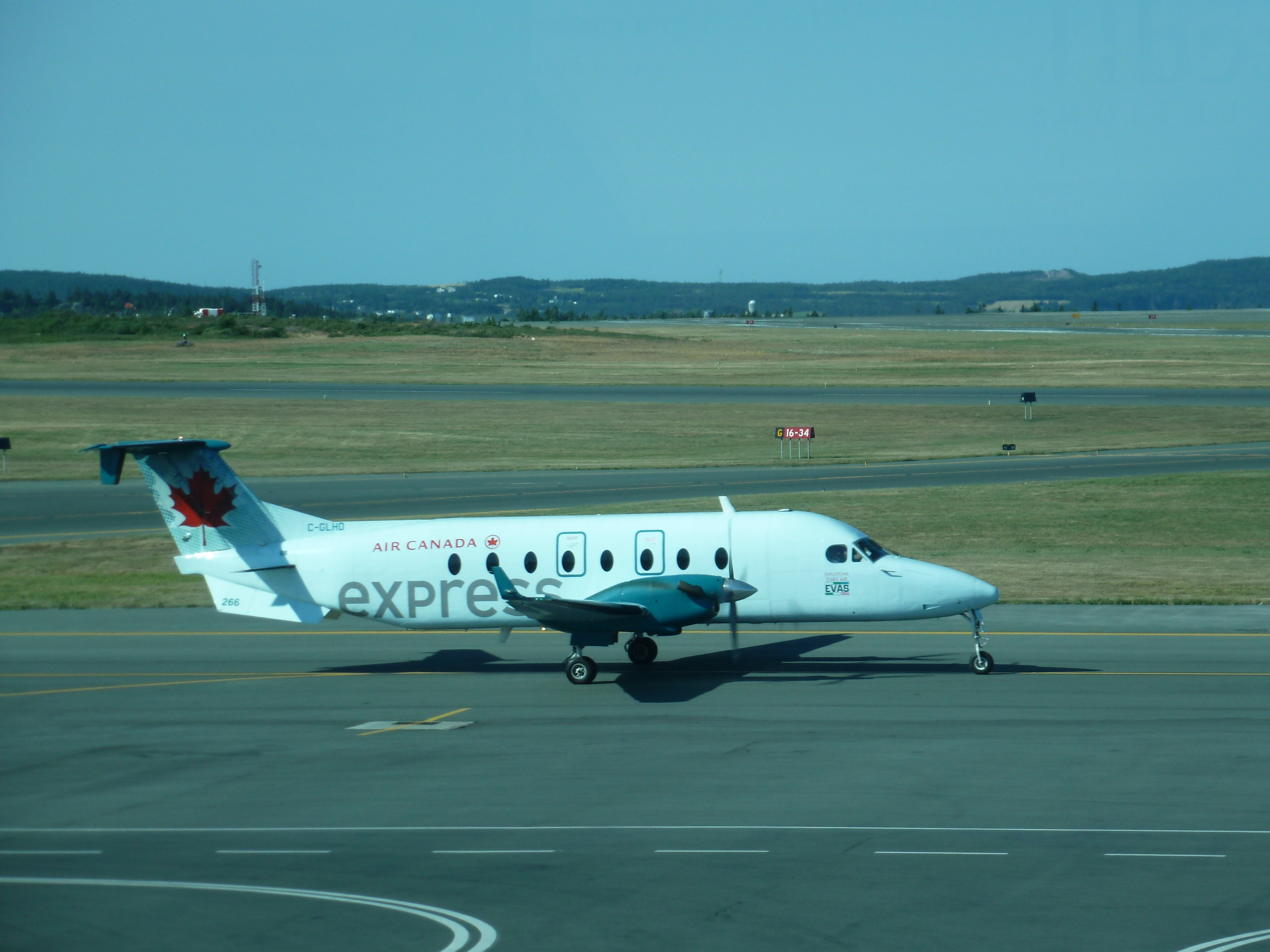
- Beechcraft 1900D in Air Canada Express livery, 2012
IATA	CDD	Call sign
8K	EV	EVAS
- Founded: 1992
- AOC #: 6676
- Hubs: Gander International Airport; Greater Moncton Roméo LeBlanc International Airport
- Focus cities: St. John's International Airport; Halifax Stanfield International Airport
- Fleet size: 27
- Headquarters: Gander, Newfoundland and Labrador
- Website: evasair.ca

Exploits Valley Air Services, operating as EVAS Air, is a Canadian aviation services company, based in Gander, Newfoundland and Labrador.

It provides a variety of services, including a flight school (known as Gander Flight Training), sightseeing flights, and maintenance. Prior to the COVID-19 pandemic it served destinations in Atlantic Canada as an Air Canada Express contractor.

EVAS operates courier route within Atlantic Canada. Using one of their Beechcraft 1900 aircraft, the run serves Newfoundland and Labrador, Nova Scotia and New Brunswick.

== Former destinations ==
Previously EVAS served the following destinations as Air Canada Express.

- Newfoundland and Labrador
  - Deer Lake - Deer Lake Regional Airport
  - Gander - Gander International Airport
  - Happy Valley-Goose Bay - Goose Bay Airport
  - St. John's - St. John's International Airport
  - Wabush (Labrador City) - Wabush Airport
- Nova Scotia
  - Halifax - Halifax Stanfield International Airport
- New Brunswick
  - Moncton - Greater Moncton Roméo LeBlanc International Airport
  - Fredericton - Fredericton International Airport
  - Saint John - Saint John Airport
- Prince Edward Island
  - Charlottetown - Charlottetown Airport

== Fleet ==
As of 4 October 2026, EVAS has 27 aircraft registered with Transport Canada. At the EVAS website they list only the Beechcraft 1900 but do not give a total number.

EVAS Air fleet
Aircraft	No. of aircraft	Variants	Notes
Beechcraft 1900	7	1900D	Up to 19 passengers
Cessna 150	1	150G	Not listed at EVAS
Cessna 152	10		Not listed at EVAS
Cessna 172	7	1 - 172F; 1 - 172K; 2 - 172M; 1 - 172N; 2 - 172S	Not listed at EVAS
Consolidated Vultee (Canso)	1	PBY-5A	Not listed at EVAS Formerly of Buffalo Airways, has two 800 imp gal (3,600 L; 960 US gal)
Piper PA-34	1	PA-34-200 Seneca	Not listed at EVAS
Total	27		

EVAS previously flown aircraft include;

- Beech A100
- Cessna 337
- de Havilland DHC-2 Beaver
- Pezetel M18 (Dromader)
- Schweizer 269
