= List of lakes of Newfoundland and Labrador =

This is an incomplete list of lakes of Newfoundland and Labrador, a province of Canada.

== Larger lake statistics ==

Newfoundland and Labrador lakes larger than 400 km^{2} (150 sq mi)
Lake	Area (including islands)	Altitude	Depth max.	Volume
Smallwood Reservoir	6,527 km^{2} (2,520 sq mi)	471 m (1,545 ft)		
Lake Melville	3,069 km^{2} (1,185 sq mi)	tidal		
Ashuanipi Lake	596 km^{2} (230 sq mi)	529 m (1,736 ft)		
Grand Lake	537 km^{2} (207 sq mi)	85 m (279 ft)	475 m (1,558 ft)	
Lac Joseph	451 km^{2} (174 sq mi)	512 m (1,680 ft)		
Atikonak Lake	431 km^{2} (166 sq mi)	518 m (1,699 ft)		

== List of lakes ==
- Ashuanipi Lake
- Atikonak Lake
- Barron Lake
- Birchy Lake
- Deer Lake
- De Mille Lake
- Gander Lake
- Georges Lake
- Grand Lake
- Lac Joseph
- Lake Melville
- Leila Wynne Lake
- Maccles lake
- Meelpaeg Lake
- Mistastin Lake
- Nipishish Lake in central Labrador
- Opocopa Lake
- Ossokmanuan Lake a reservoir in western Labrador
- Quidi Vidi Lake
- Sandy Lake, north section of Grand Lake
- Shabogamo Lake
- Sheffield Lake
- Smallwood Reservoir (largest lake in the province - 6527 km^{2})
- Terra Nova Lake

== See also ==
- List of lakes of Canada
