= Goose Bay Airport (disambiguation) =

Goose Bay Airport may refer to:

- Goose Bay Airport, co-located with the Canadian Forces Base in Happy Valley-Goose Bay, Newfoundland and Labrador (IATA: YYR)
- Goose Bay Airport (Alaska), located in Goose Bay, Alaska, United States (FAA: Z40)
