= Churchill Falls Airport =

Airport in Newfoundland and Labrador, Canada

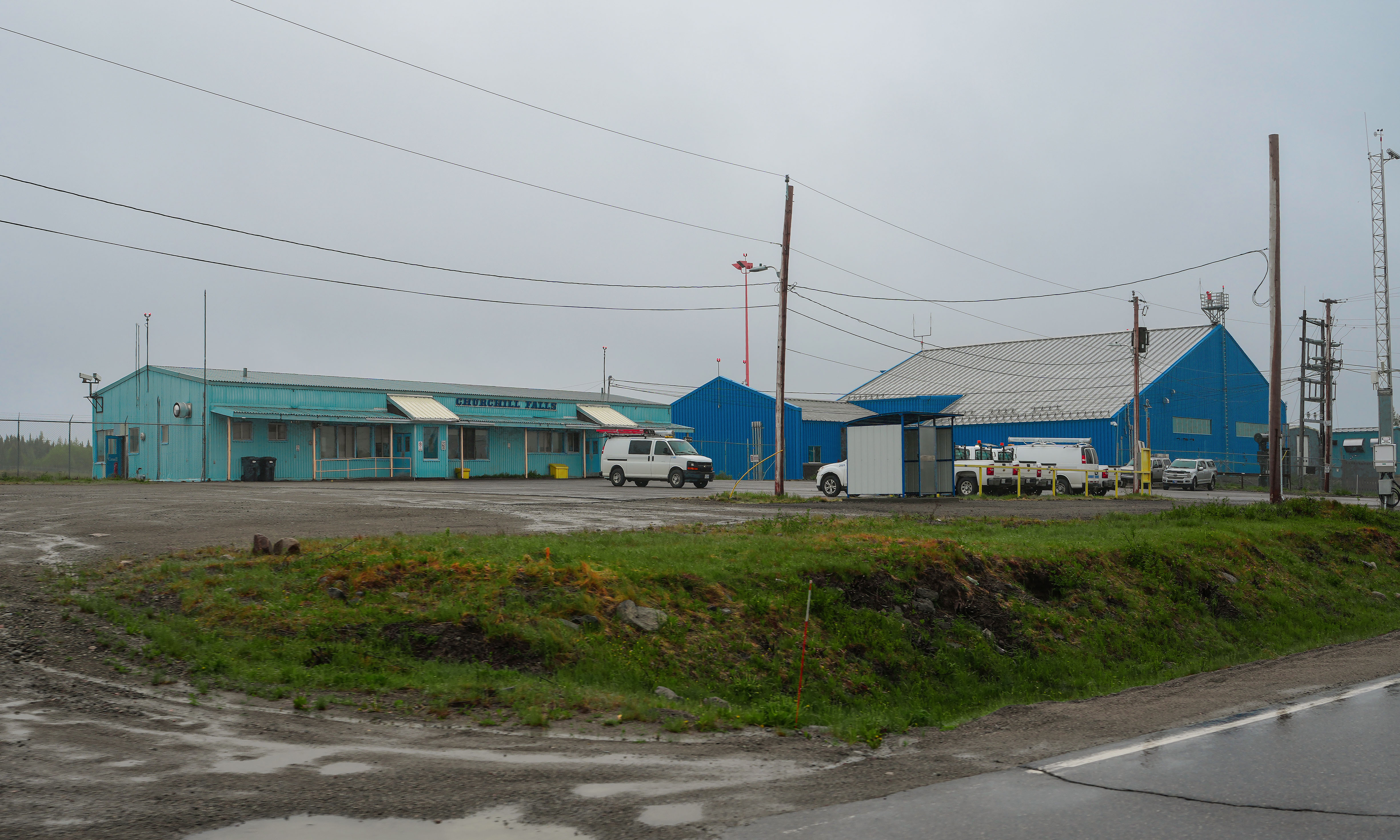
- IATA: ZUM; ICAO: CZUM; WMO: 71182

Summary
- Airport type: Public
- Owner/Operator: Churchill Falls (Labrador) Corp.
- Location: Churchill Falls, Newfoundland and Labrador
- Time zone: AST (UTC−04:00)
  - Summer (DST): ADT (UTC−03:00)
- Elevation AMSL: 1,437 ft / 438 m
- Coordinates: 53°33′45″N 064°06′21″W

Map

Runways
Direction	Length		Surface
Direction	ft	m	Surface
13/31	5,500	1,676	Asphalt
- Sources: Canada Flight Supplement; Environment Canada; Transport Canada

Churchill Falls Airport (IATA: ZUM, ICAO: CZUM) is owned and operated by Churchill Falls Labrador Corporation Limited. Provincial Airlines provides regularly scheduled passenger service at the airport, which handled about 1,400 passengers annually over between 2000 and 2003. The airport is located 4 nautical miles (7.4 km; 4.6 mi) northwest of Churchill Falls, Newfoundland and Labrador, Canada.

Four small structures are the only buildings, as the airport has no formal terminal.

== Airlines and destinations ==
Airlines	Destinations
PAL Airlines	Goose Bay, Wabush

== Historical airline service ==
The airport had scheduled passenger jet service during the 1970s operated by Eastern Provincial Airways (EPA) with nonstop Boeing 737-200 jetliner flights to Goose Bay and Wabush with connecting service to Halifax and other cities in eastern Canada. In 1970, EPA was operating round trip 737 service six days a week on a routing of St. John's - Gander - Deer Lake - Goose Bay - Churchill Falls - Wabush - Montreal.

Quebecair was serving the airport with BAC One-Eleven jets in 1972 with a round trip routing of Churchill Falls - Wabush - Sept-Iles - Quebec City - Montreal operated twice a week. Quebecair also served Churchill Falls with Fairchild F-27 turboprop aircraft during the late 1960s and early 1970s.
