= Meelpaeg Lake =

Lake in Newfoundland and Labrador

- Meelpaeg Reservoir
- Interactive map of Meelpaeg Lake
- Location: Newfoundland and Labrador
- Coordinates: 48°14′45″N 56°35′40″W
- Basin countries: Canada
- Max. length: 28 kilometres (17 mi)
- Max. width: 16 kilometres (9.9 mi)
- Surface elevation: 365 kilometres (227 mi)

Meelpaeg Lake, also known as Meelpaeg Reservoir, is a natural lake that forms part of the Bay d’Espoir hydroelectric development and functions as a reservoir within the system. It located in Newfoundland and Labrador, Canada, adjacent to Ebbegunbaeg Hill and Mount Gabriel. The term Meelpaeg is a Mi'kmaq phrase for 'Lake of many bays or coves'.

== Geography ==
Meelpaeg Lake is measured approximately 28 kilometres (17 mi) in length and 16 kilometres (9.9 mi) in width. The Bay d’Espoir system, a large reservoir development, lies within the lake. Meelpaeg Lake has an approximate elevation of 365 metres (1,198 ft) above sea level.

== See also ==
- List of lakes of Newfoundland and Labrador
