= Atikonak Lake =

Lake in Newfoundland and Labrador, Canada

- Location in Labrador
- Location: Southern Labrador, Newfoundland and Labrador, Canada
- Coordinates: 52°39′N 64°32′W
- Basin countries: Canada
- Surface area: 431 km^{2} (166 sq mi)
- Surface elevation: 518 m (1,699 ft)

Atikonak Lake is a lake in southern Labrador near the border with Quebec, Canada.

The flora is population of endemic genus Atikonakia of Volvocaceae.

== See also ==
- List of lakes of Newfoundland and Labrador
