= Barron Lake =

Lake in Newfoundland and Labrador, Canada

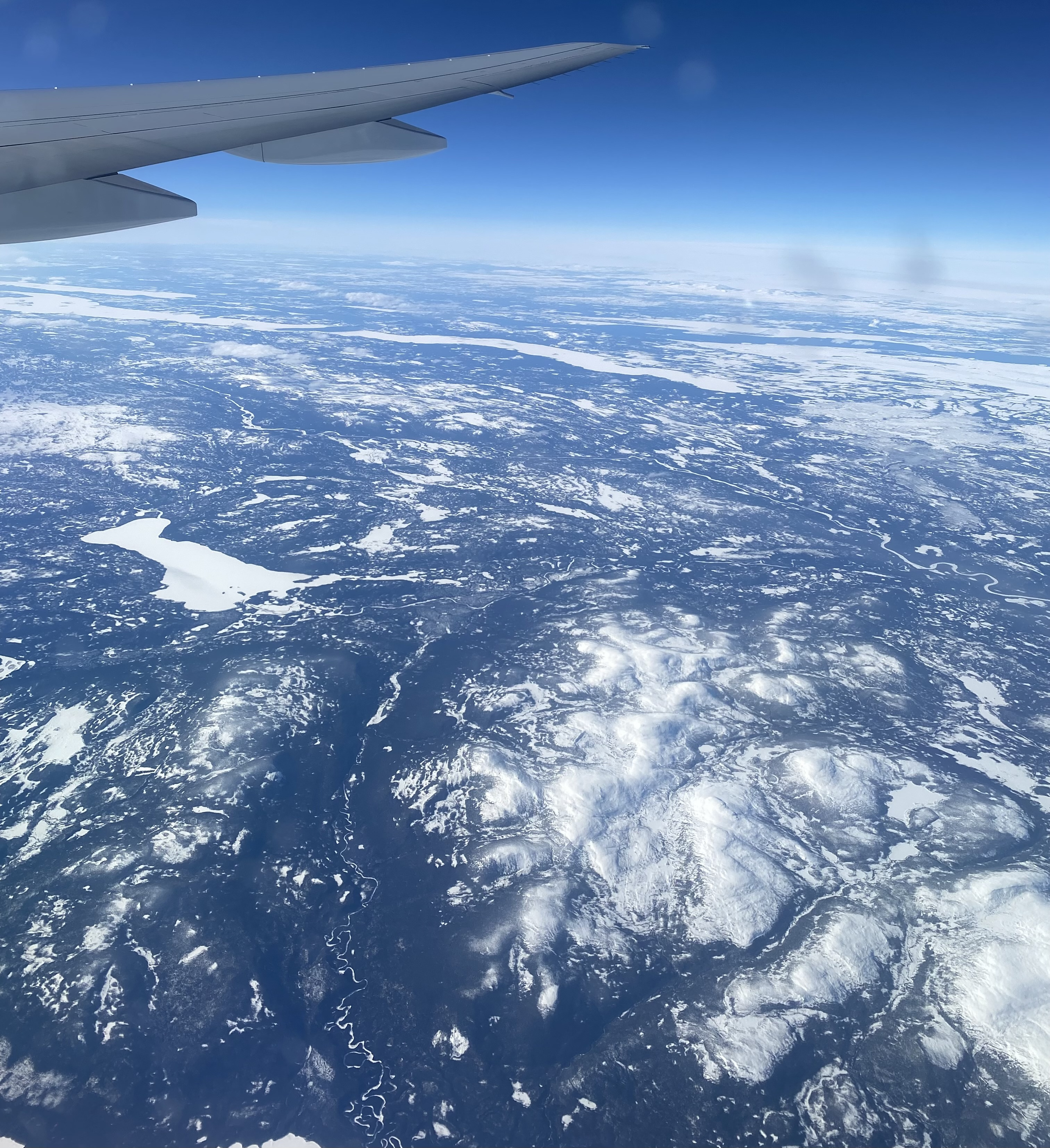
- A view of the lake in April from a plane, it can be seen as a large white patch on the left side of the image

- Location in Labrador
- Location: Southeastern Labrador, Newfoundland and Labrador, Canada
- Coordinates: 53°43′N 57°43′W
- Basin countries: Canada
- Surface area: 19.8 km^{2} (7.6 sq mi)
- Surface elevation: 117 m (384 ft)

Barron Lake is a lake in southeastern Labrador near Sandwich Bay, Canada. It covers just under 20 km^{2} (7.7 sq mi) and is at an elevation of 117 m (384 ft). The lake is located in the 13H12 NTS zone.

Barron River flows out of the lake and joins with North River about 20 km (12 mi) to the north. The Mealy Mountains surround the lake, which is also a part of the Mealy Mountains National Park Reserve.

== Geology ==
The lake is surrounded by late-Labradorian granitoid intrusions (dated 1660-1600 ma): megacrystic/porphyritic granite to granodiorite; early-Labradorian granitoid and associated rocks (dated 1678-1671 ma): foliated to gneissic granite and alkali feldspar granite, foliated to gneissic syenite, alkali feldspar syenite and alkali feldspar granite, and compositionally equivalent well-banded gneiss; and pre-Labradorian supracrustal rocks (dated 1800-1770 ma): pelitic schist and gneiss, quartz-feldspar psammitic schist and gneiss, and metasedimentary diatexite.

== See also ==
- List of lakes of Newfoundland and Labrador
