= Leila Wynne Lake =

Lake in Newfoundland and Labrador, Canada

- Location within Newfoundland and Labrador
- Location: Newfoundland and Labrador, Canada
- Coordinates: 53.091°N 66.790°W
- Surface elevation: 544 metres (1,785 ft)

Leila Wynne Lake is a lake in the province of Newfoundland and Labrador in Eastern Canada. it is 1,100 kilometres (680 mi) northeast of the Canadian capital of Ottawa.

The lake is 544 metres (1,785 ft) above sea level. The highest point in the immediate vicinity is 582 metres (1,909 ft) above sea level, 1.0 kilometre (0.62 mi) northeast of Leila Wynne Lake.

The vegetation around Leila Wynne Lake is primarily low growing subarctic forest. The population density is fewer than two inhabitants per square kilometer. The region is part of the boreal climate zone. The average annual air temperature is -7 °C. The warmest month is August, when the average temperature is 12 °C and the coldest is January, with -25 °C.

Most of Leila Wynne Lake is underlain by marble of the Denault Formation. The southern shore has a bedrock of schist.
