= Denault Formation =

Geologic formation in Canada

The Denault Formation is a Precambrian group of rocks, occurring in the Labrador Trough, which have an exceptionally high content of carbonate for the era. The main mineral is dolomite. Some sections are near-pure dolostone while others contain abundant chalcedony, chert, or quartz in mixture with dolomite. In the vicinity of Wabush, dolomitic marble and calcitic marble are present; some dolomitic marble sections contain inclusions of chlorite schist
