= Quebecair =

Canadian airline (1947–1986)

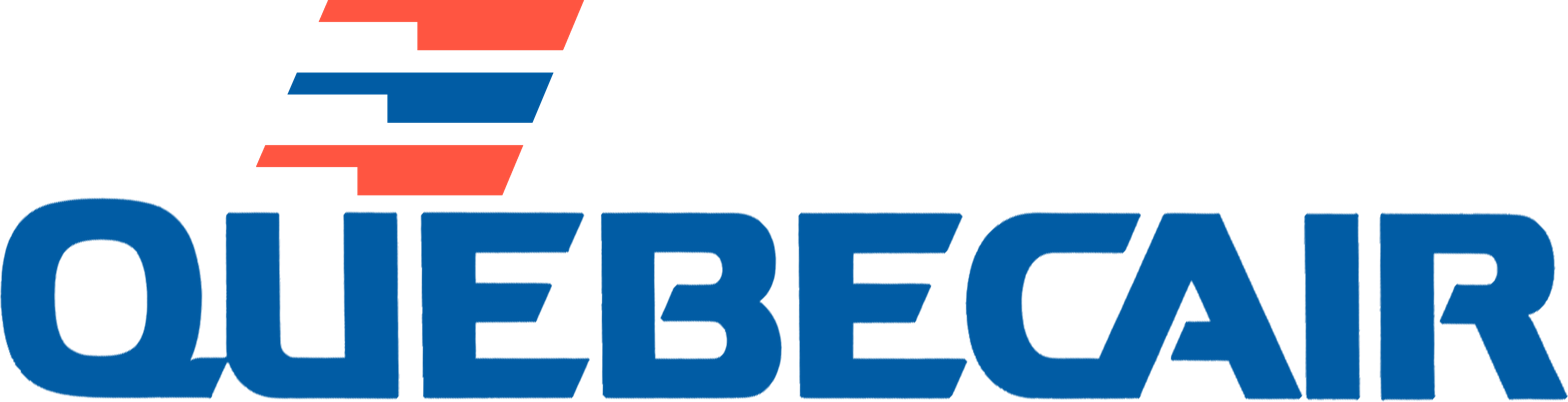
| IATA | ICAO | Call sign |
|---|---|---|
| QB | QBA | QUEBECAIR |
- Commenced operations: 1947
- Ceased operations: 1986
- Hubs: Montréal–Dorval; Montréal–Mirabel
- Destinations: 27
- Headquarters: Saint-Laurent, Quebec, Canada

Quebecair was a Canadian airline that operated from 1947 until 1986. Quebecair was headquartered in Saint-Laurent, Quebec, now a part of Montreal.

== History ==
=== Early years ===
Early Quebecair Logo

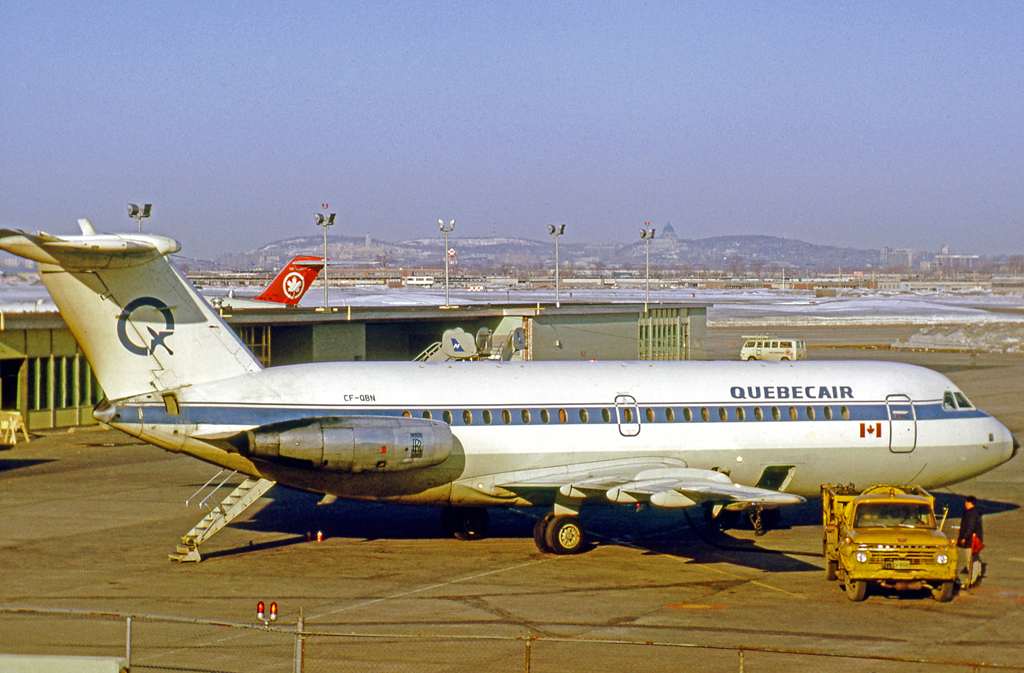
Quebecair BAC One-Eleven at Montreal Dorval in 1971

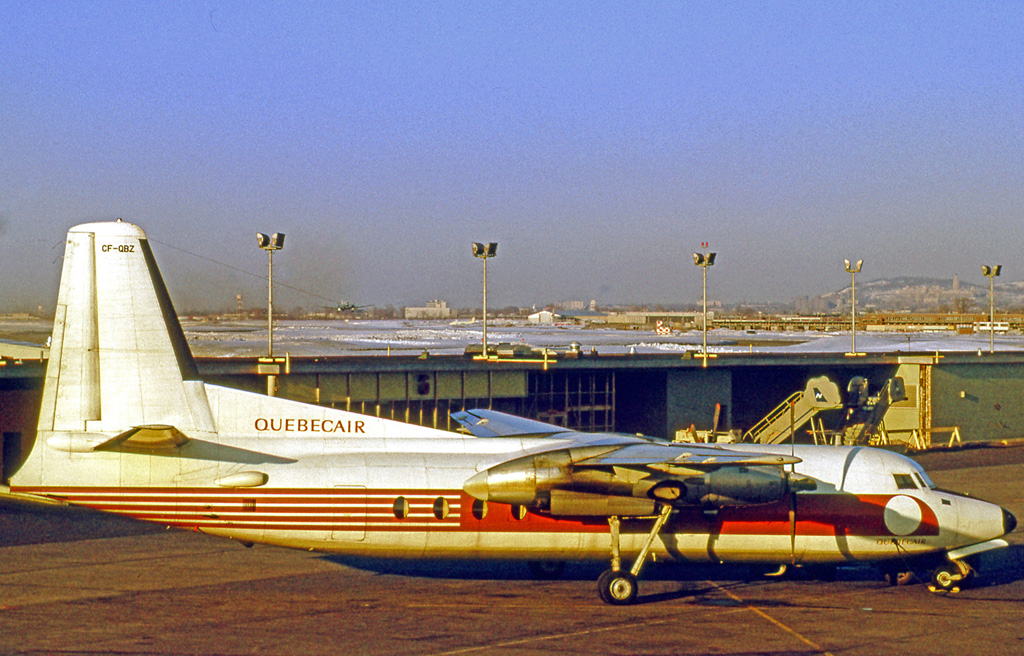
Quebecair Fairchild F-27 turboprop airliner at Montreal Dorval in 1971

Quebecair began as Rimouski Airlines in 1947 and flew under that name until it merged with Gulf Aviation in 1953 under the name Quebec-Air. The aircraft in operation at the time were the Beech 18, the de Havilland Canada DHC-2 Beaver and the Douglas DC-3. Operations were mainly based in Quebec and Montreal was added in 1957. Eventually the latter city became the operating base for Quebecair.

In 1958, a fire in a hangar destroyed three DC-3s, and Fairchild F-27 turboprop aircraft were then purchased to replace the destroyed aircraft. The F-27 propjets proved to be very successful. As operations increased, the company introduced a new, larger aircraft in the form of the Convair CV-540 turboprop, which was put on the main route between Montreal and Quebec. In later years, Quebecair also operated the Convair 580 turboprop.

During the 1960s, the company took over various airlines as Matane Air Service, Northern Wings, RoyalAir and Northern Wings Helicopter in 1965. The increase in operations brought the introduction of the first jet aircraft, the British Aircraft Corporation BAC One-Eleven, which were put into use on the Montreal - Toronto route in 1969.

=== Later years ===
1970s Logo

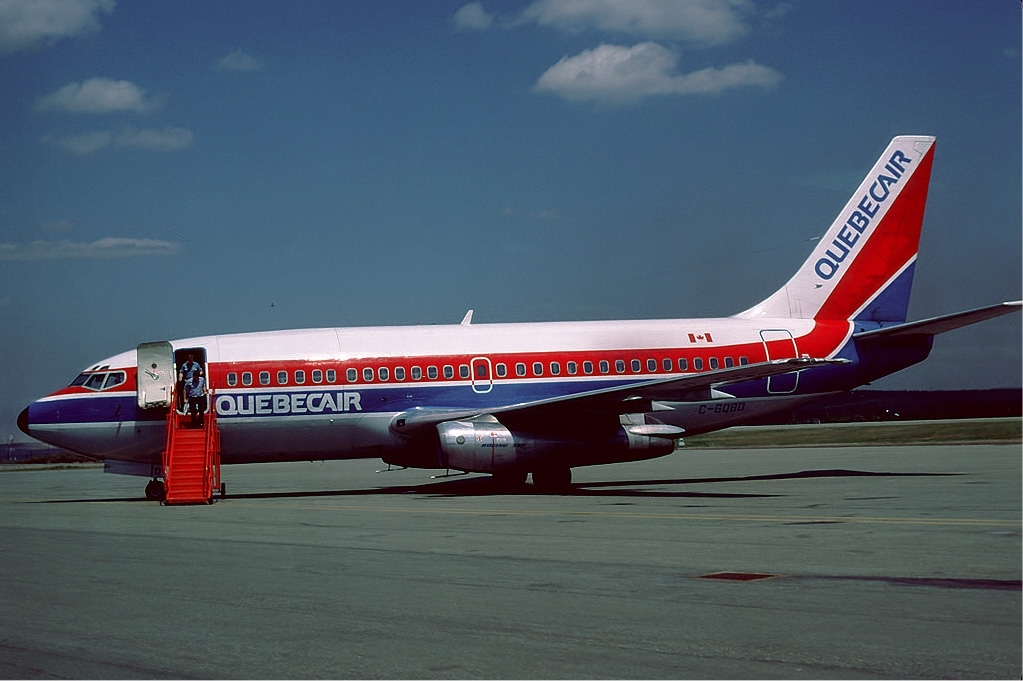
Boeing 737-200 at Wabush Airport in 1985.

The company took over Air Gaspé in 1973 and acquired more northern routes. In 1974 it bought two Boeing 707s for charter work and also a Boeing 727-100 aircraft for scheduled passenger service. It conducted charter flights to destinations in Florida, the Caribbean, Europe and Hawaii. Charter flights were discontinued in 1979 and the 707s were sold off. According to the February 1976 and November 1979 Official Airline Guides (OAG), Quebecair operated the Boeing 727-100 jetliner in scheduled passenger operations between Montreal, Quebec City and other destinations in Quebec and Newfoundland provinces.

By 1981 the financial conditions at Quebecair had become difficult. All aircraft models except for the Fairchild F-27 turboprops and BAC One-Eleven jets were sold. This was a difficult time for Quebecair and other airlines. It did not introduce the Boeing 737-200 until 1982 when the 737s began replacing the BAC One-Elevens. The 111's were gone by 1985.

In 1984 Quebecair leased two Douglas DC-8-63s for transatlantic charter flights, but these stretched Super DC-8s were not operated very long and merged with Regionair. According to the October 1985 Quebecair timetable, the airline was operating scheduled passenger jet service on two international routes, being Montreal-Boston and Quebec City-New York City.

1985 was a very difficult year for Quebecair as the airline industry in Canada was restructuring. The financial situation at the carrier forced the Quebec government (which had owned the airline for several years) to sell the company to CP Air in July 1986. In continuing consolidation involving several other Canadian air carriers, Pacific Western Airlines notably purchased and took over CP Air, which then became Canadian Airlines International in 1987.

== Destinations ==
The 1980 route map lists the following Canadian destinations being served:

- Gagnon, Quebec
- Montreal, Quebec
  - Montréal–Dorval International Airport
  - Montréal–Mirabel International Airport
- Quebec City, Quebec
- Toronto, Ontario
- Schefferville, Quebec
- Wabush, Newfoundland and Labrador
- Sept-Îles, Quebec
- Havre-Saint-Pierre, Quebec
- Baie-Johan-Beetz, Quebec
- Natashquan, Quebec
- Kegaska, Quebec
- Chevery Airport, Quebec
- Churchill Falls Airport, Newfoundland
- Harrington Harbour, Quebec
- Tête-à-La-Baleine Airport, Quebec
- Bagotville, (Saguenay), Quebec
- Blanc-Sablon, Quebec
- Port-Menier, Quebec
- Îles de la Madeleine, Quebec
- Bonaventure, Quebec
- Gaspé, Quebec
- Rimouski, Quebec
- Baie-Comeau, Quebec
- Saguenay, Quebec
- Rouyn-Noranda, Quebec
- Val-d'Or, Quebec

And in the United States:

- Boston, Massachusetts (Boston Logan International Airport)
- Newark, New Jersey (Newark Liberty International Airport)

== Fleet ==
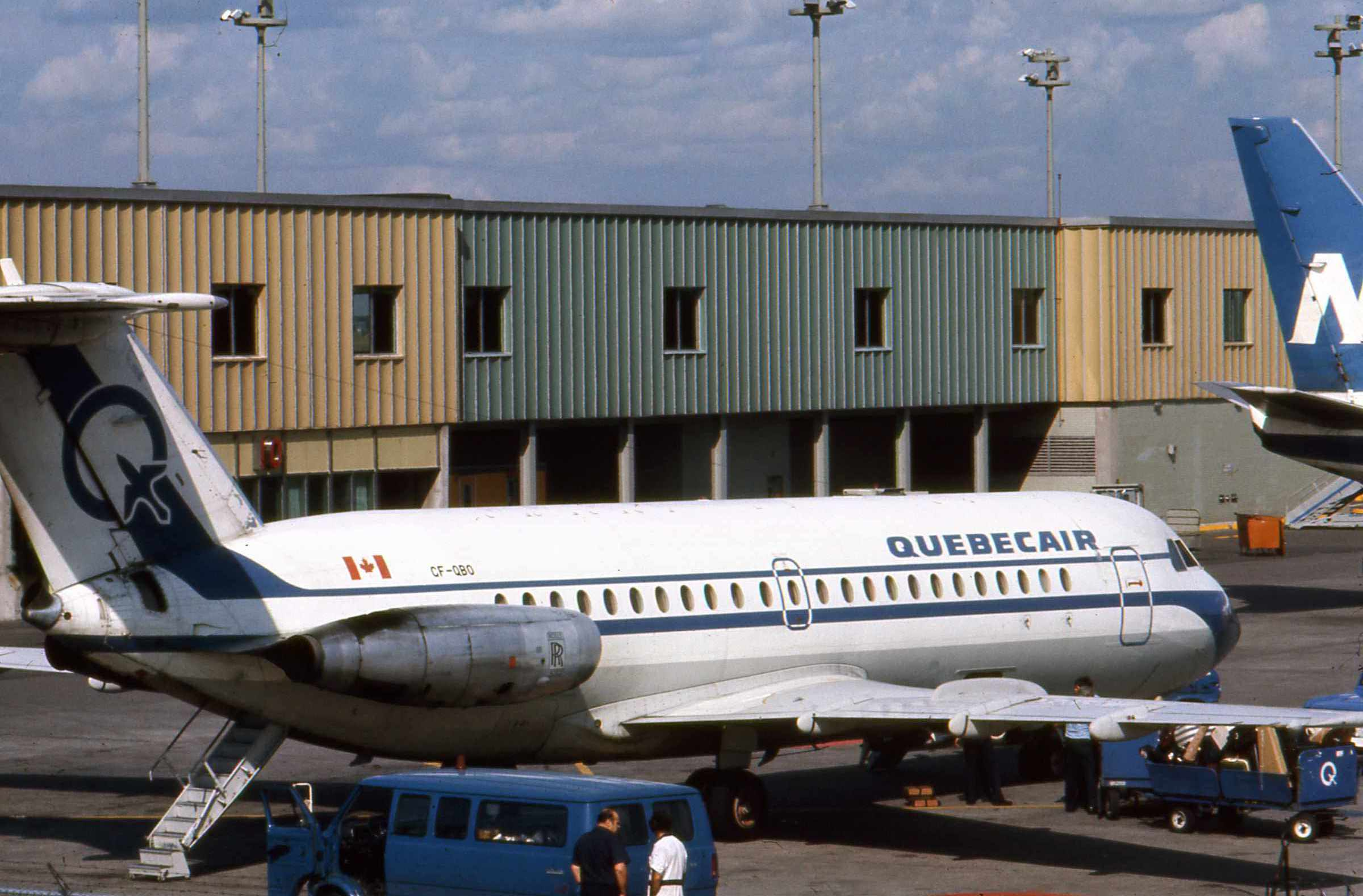
Quebecair operated BAC One-Eleven

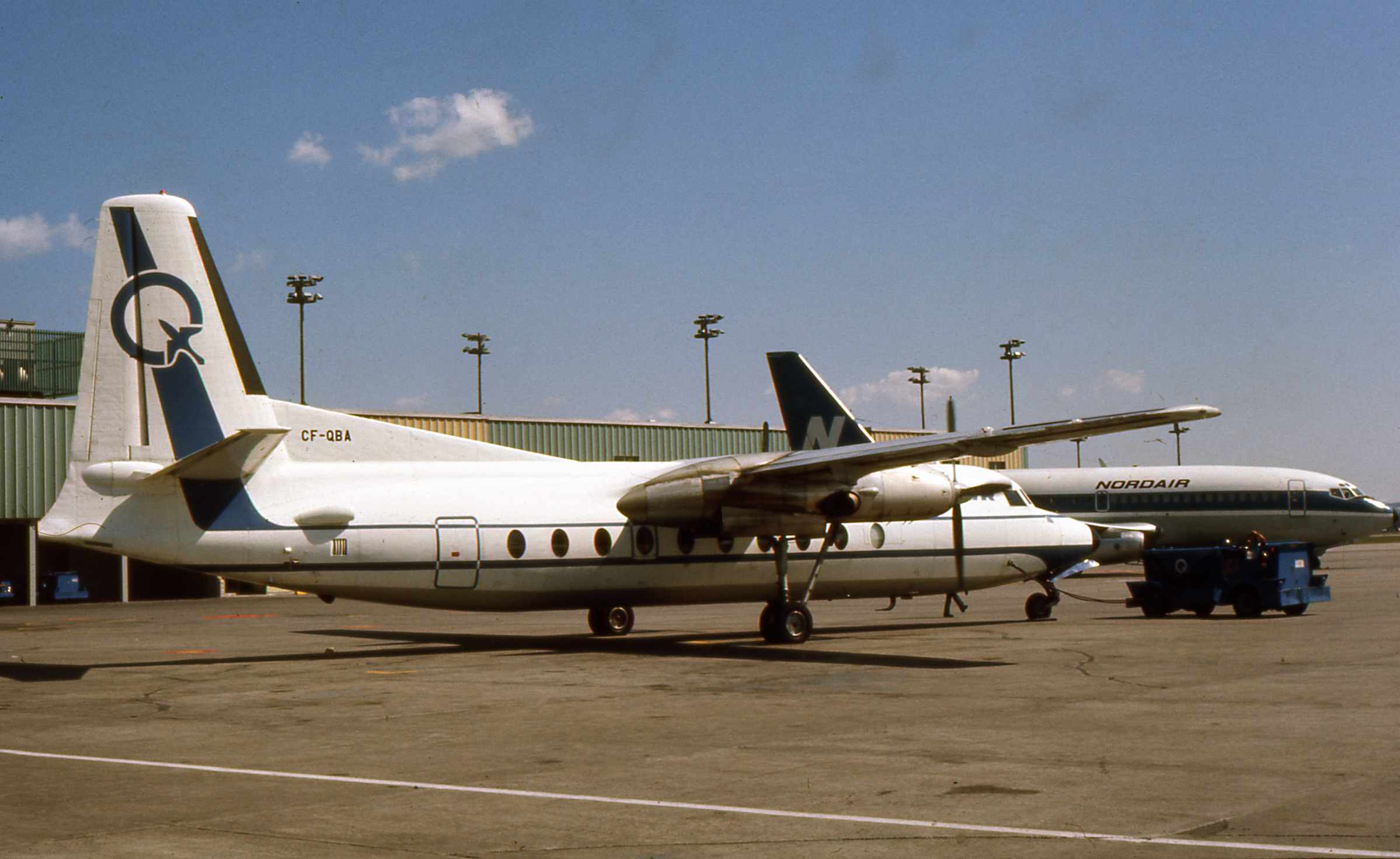
One of the four Fairchild F-27 turboprops operated on shorter routes

Jet aircraft

- Boeing 707-123B (used for passenger charter services only)
- Boeing 727-100 (B727-025 model)
- Boeing 737-200
- British Aircraft Corporation BAC One-Eleven
- Douglas DC-8-63 (stretched Super DC-8 used for passenger charter services only)
- Douglas DC-8-54F (used to transport cargo only)
- Fokker F28 Fellowship

Turboprop aircraft

- Convair 540
- Convair 580
- de Havilland Canada DHC-6 Twin Otter
- Fairchild F-27
- Hawker Siddeley HS 748

Piston aircraft

- Beechcraft 18
- Britten-Norman BN-2 Islander
- Consolidated PBY (Canso model amphibian aircraft)
- Cessna T-50 (operated by predecessor Rimouski Airlines)
- Curtiss C-46 Commando (used to transport cargo only)
- de Havilland Canada DHC-2 Beaver
- de Havilland Canada DHC-3 Otter
- Douglas DC-3 (also operated the C-47 model)
- Douglas DC-4

== Accidents and incidents ==
- On July 24, 1948, a Rimouski Airlines Douglas C-47 Skytrain flying from Port-Menier to Gaspé stalled and crashed near Cap-des-Rosiers, killing all 29 passengers and crew.
- On December 14, 1972, Quebecair Flight 321 was hijacked by Larry Maxwell Stanford. Stanford boarded the flight in Wabush, Newfoundland, and took control of the aircraft with a .22 caliber rifle. He forced the pilots to fly to Montreal, then to Ottawa, and finally back to Montreal. Stewardess Josette Côté Dishongh was credited with talking Stanford into releasing the passengers and then surrendering at Montreal after the 10-hour ordeal.
- On February 19, 1979, Quebecair Flight 714, a Boeing 707-123B C-GQBH operating a flight from Toronto, caught a wind shear while on approach to Hewanorra International Airport in St. Lucia. The windshear caused the aircraft to halt its descent while already over the threshold. The copilot who was flying at that time retarded the throttles, however at that very moment the aircraft had passed the windshear zone and the nose of the aircraft slammed into the runway and bounced twice, destroying the nose landing gear. There were no fatalities and minor injuries in this incident. The aircraft was damaged beyond repair and was written off.
- On March 29, 1979, Quebecair Flight 255, a Fairchild F-27 (tail number: CF-QBL) flying from Quebec City to Montreal crashed after an engine exploded shortly after take off, killing all three crew and 14 out of 21 passengers.

== See also ==
- List of defunct airlines of Canada
