= CFB Goose Bay =

Royal Canadian Air Force base

CFB Goose Bay
- Goose Bay Airport; CFS Goose Bay
- Happy Valley-Goose Bay, Newfoundland and Labrador in Canada
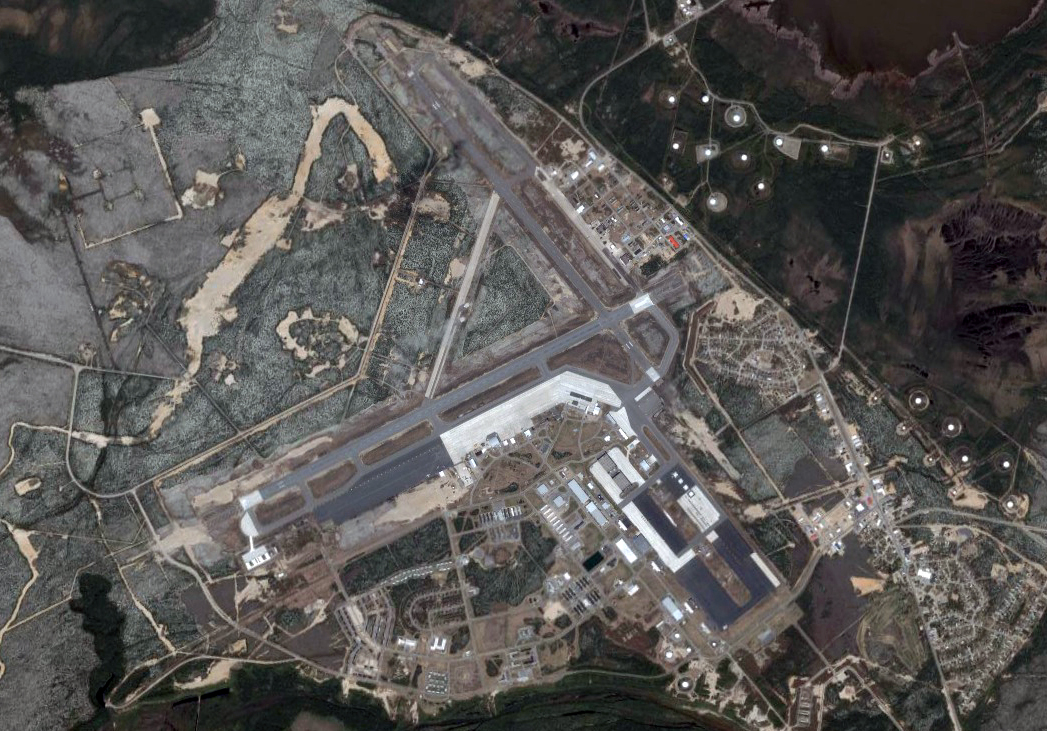

Site information
- Type: Military / civilian
- Owner: Government of Canada
- Operator: 5 Wing Ops Centre
- Civilian operator: Goose Bay Airport Corporation
- Website: https://www.canada.ca/en/air-force/corporate/wings/5-wing.html

Location
- Location in Newfoundland and Labrador
- Coordinates: 53°19′09″N 060°25′33″W

Site history
- Built: 1941 – 1943
- Built by: Royal Canadian Air Force
- In use: 1941 – present

Garrison information
- Current commander: Lieutenant-Colonel William Brake
- Garrison: 5 Wing
- Occupants: 444 Combat Support Squadron; 5 Wing Air Reserve Flight; Forward Operating Location Goose Bay

Airfield information
- Identifiers: IATA: YYR, ICAO: CYYR, WMO: 71816
- Elevation: 160 ft (49 m) AMSL
Runways
Direction	Length and surface
08/26	11,052 ft (3,369 m) concrete with asphalt overlay
15/33	9,584 ft (2,921 m) concrete with asphalt overlay
- Hosted deployments of units from: Luftwaffe 1980–2005; Aeronautica Militare 2001–2005 Royal Netherlands Air Force 1985–2005

RAF(U) Goose Bay

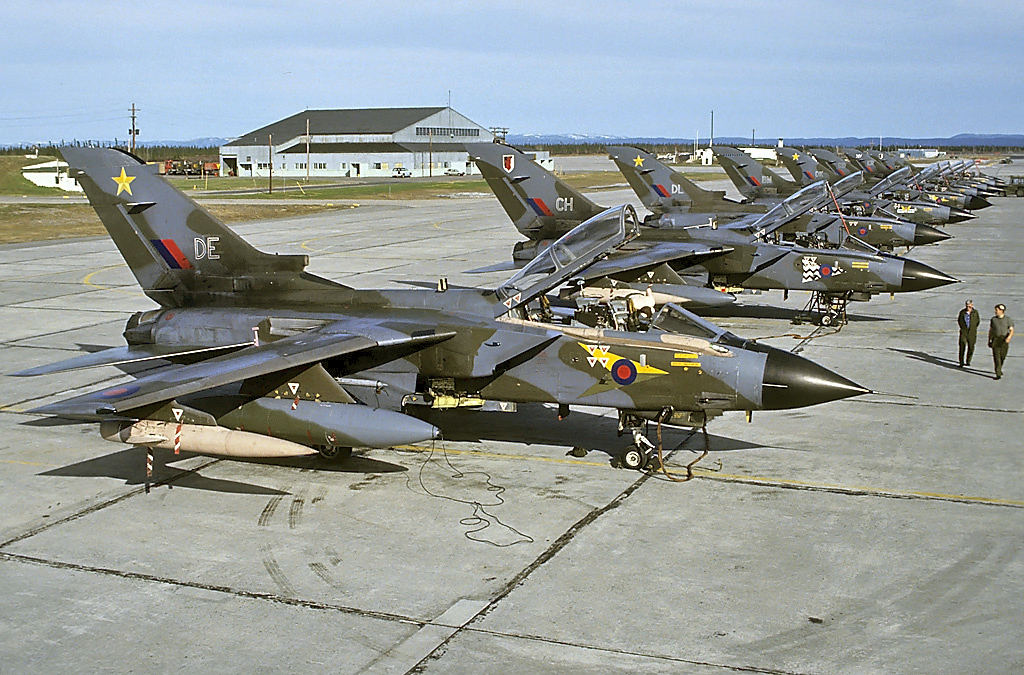
- Royal Air Force Panavia Tornados

Site information
- Type: Royal air force unit
- Owner: Ministry of Defence
- Operator: Royal Air Force
- Condition: Closed

Site history
- Built: 1941
- In use: 1942–2005
- Fate: Transferred to the Royal Canadian Air Force to become CFB Goose Bay

Garrison information
- Garrison: No. 1 Group
- Occupants: No. 14 Squadron; No. XV(R) Squadron; No. 17 Squadron; No. 20 Squadron; No. 25 (Fighter) Squadron; No. 31 Squadron; No. 617 Squadron

Goose Air Force Base

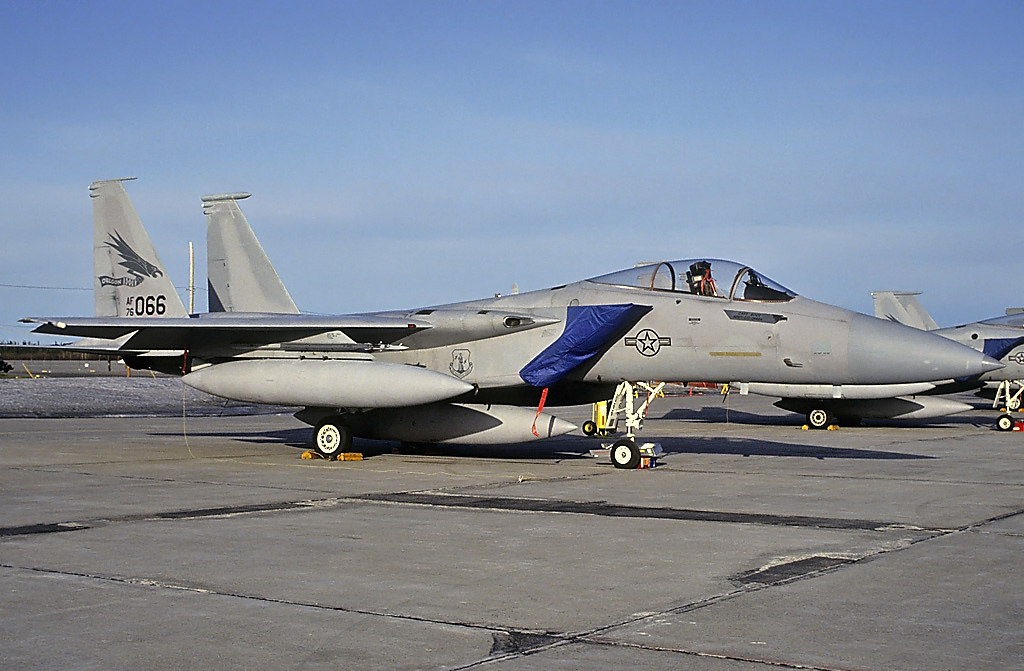
- USAF F-15 at Goose AFB

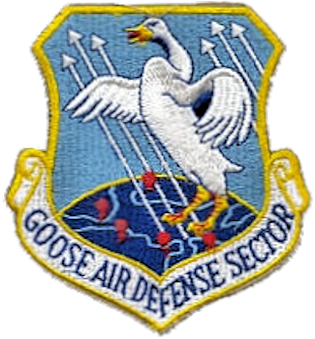

Site information
- Type: US Air Force Base
- Owner: Department of Defense
- Operator: United States Air Force
- Condition: Closed

Site history
- Built: 1941
- In use: 1942–1976
- Fate: Transferred to the Royal Canadian Air Force to become CFB Goose Bay

Garrison information
- Garrison: Aerospace Defense Command; Strategic Air Command; Northeast Air Command; Goose Air Defense Sector; Air Transport Command
- Occupants: 21st Air Division; 26th Air Division; 37th Air Division; 64th Air Division; 95th Strategic Wing; 4082d Strategic Wing; 59th Fighter-Interceptor Squadron; 641st Aircraft Control Squadron; 4732d Air Defense Group; 6603d Air Base Group; Twenty-First Air Force

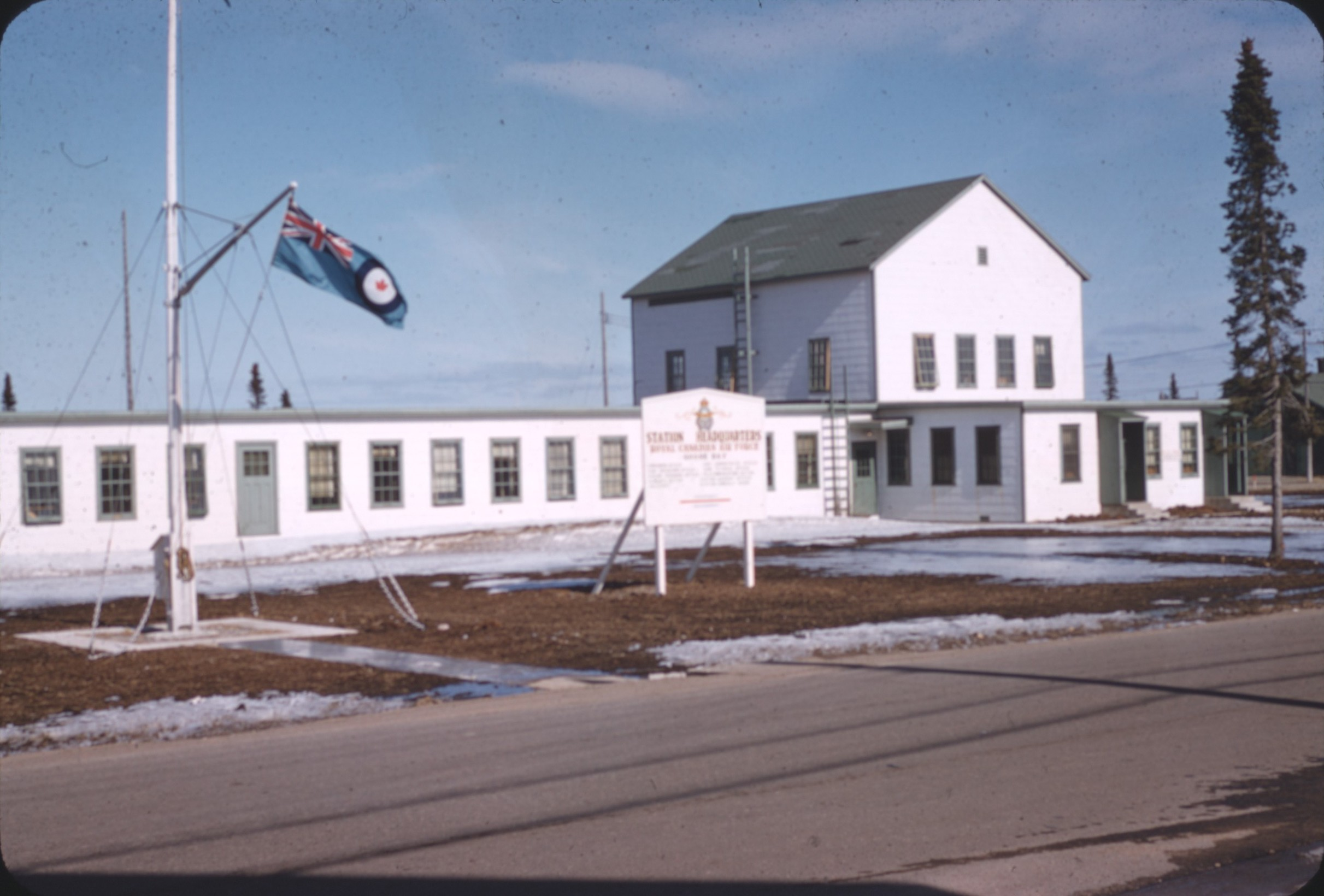
RCAF Goose Bay Station Headquarters c.1957

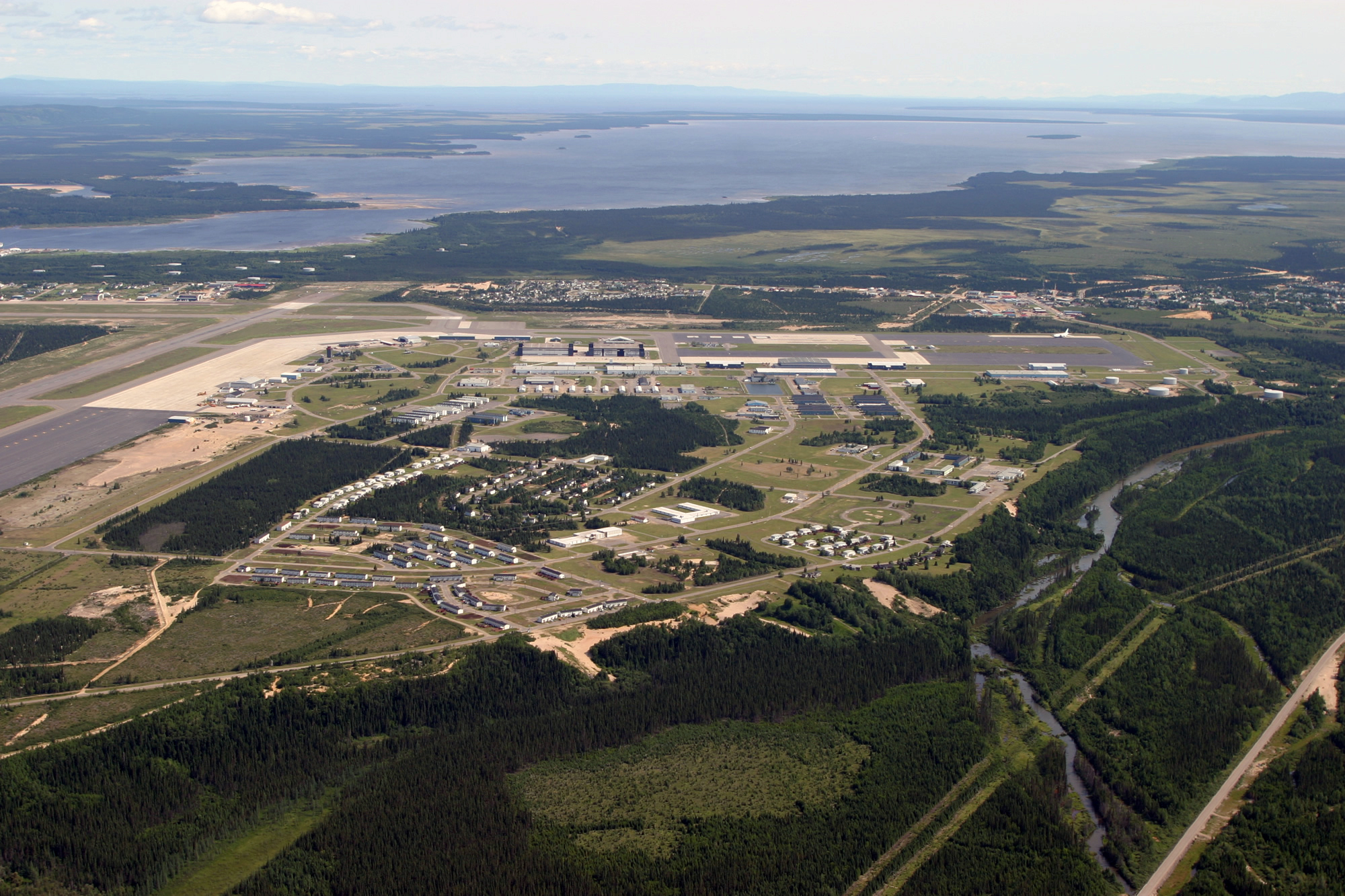
5 Wing Goose Bay

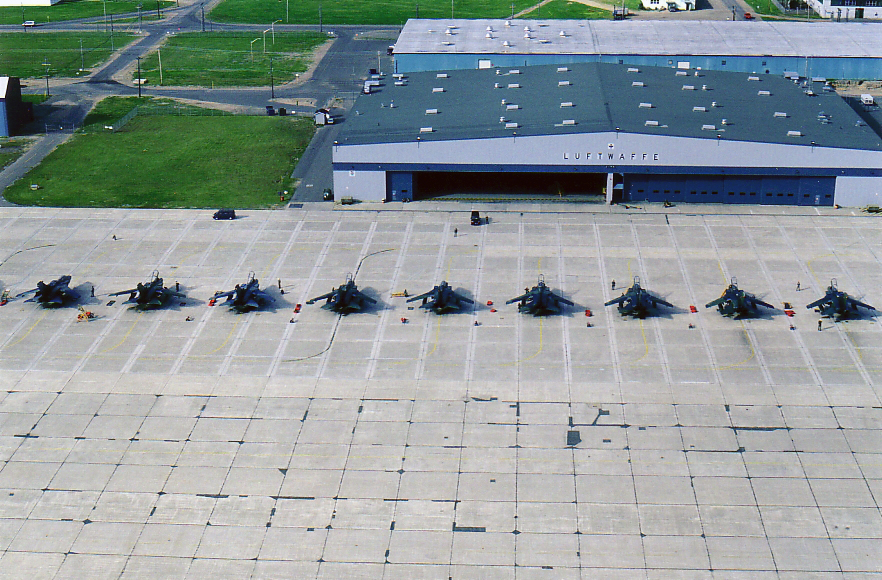
Luftwaffe Tornados at CFB Goose Bay

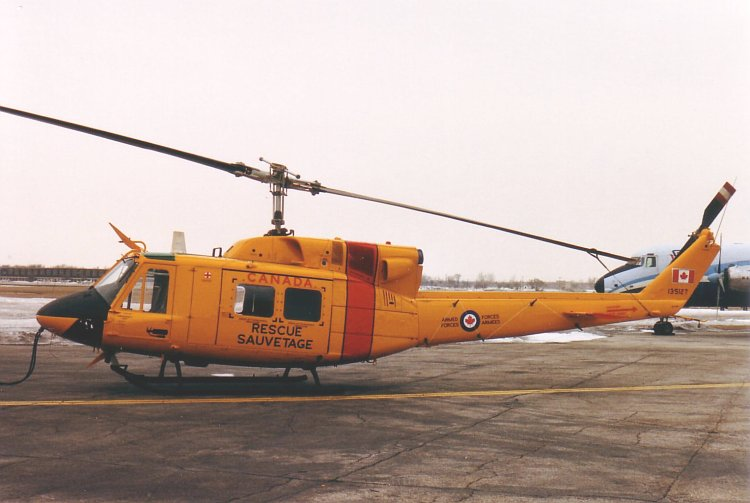
CH-135 Twin Huey from Base Rescue Goose Bay (later 444 Squadron)

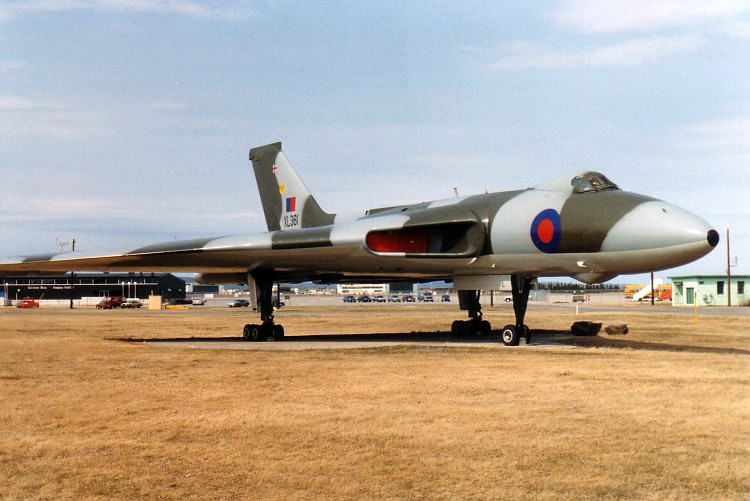
Avro Vulcan XL361 on display at CFB Goose Bay

Canadian Forces Base Goose Bay (IATA: YYR, ICAO: CYYR), commonly referred to as CFB Goose Bay, is a Canadian Forces Base located in the municipality of Happy Valley-Goose Bay in the province of Newfoundland and Labrador. It is operated as an air force base by the Royal Canadian Air Force (RCAF). Its primary RCAF lodger unit is 5 Wing, commonly referred to as 5 Wing Goose Bay.

The airfield at CFB Goose Bay is also used by civilian aircraft, with civilian operations at the base referring to the facility as Goose Bay Airport. The airport is classified as an airport of entry by Nav Canada and is staffed by the Canada Border Services Agency (CBSA). CBSA officers at this airport can handle general aviation aircraft only, with no more than 15 passengers.

The mission of 5 Wing is to support the defence of North American airspace, as well as to support the RCAF and allied air forces in training. Two units compose 5 Wing: 444 Combat Support Squadron (flying the CH-146 Griffon) and 5 Wing Air Reserve Flight. CFB Goose Bay also serves as a forward operating location for RCAF CF-18 Hornet aircraft and the base and surrounding area is occasionally used to support units of the Canadian Army during training exercises.

== History ==
While the flat and relatively weather-favoured area around North West River had for years been under consideration for an airport for the anticipated North Atlantic air routes, it was not until Eric Fry of the Dominion Geodetic Survey investigated the area on 1 July 1941 that the Goose Bay location was selected. Fry beat by three days a similar United States Army Air Forces (USAAF) survey team under Captain Elliott Roosevelt; the American team had first investigated nearby Epinette Point before joining Fry at the sandy plains that would become Goose Bay. These surveys used amphibious aircraft that landed at the Grenfell Mission; from there the teams explored by boat.

Eric Fry recalled: "The airport is actually located on the plateau at the west end of Terrington Basin but it is only five miles inland from the narrows between Goose Bay and Terrington Basin. Having a RCAF Station Gander in Newfoundland I suggested we call the Labrador site Goose Bay airport and the suggestion was accepted."

Under pressure from Britain and the United States the Canadian Air Ministry worked at a record pace, and by November, three 7,000 ft (2,100 m) gravel runways were ready. The first land aircraft movement was recorded on 9 December 1941. By spring of 1942 the base, now carrying the wartime codename "Alkali", was bursting with air traffic destined for the United Kingdom. In time, the USAAF and the Royal Air Force (RAF) each developed sections of the triangular base for their own use, but the airport remained under overall Canadian control despite its location in the Dominion of Newfoundland, not yet a part of Canada. The 99-year lease arrangement with the United Kingdom was not finalized until October 1944.

=== Aerodrome ===
In approximately 1942 the aerodrome was listed as RCAF Aerodrome – Goose Bay, Labrador at 53°20′N 60°24′W with a variation of 35 degrees west and elevation of 147 ft (45 m). The field was listed as "all hard-surfaced" and had three runways listed as follows:

Runway name	Length	Width	Surface
9/27	6,600 ft (2,000 m)	200 ft (61 m)	Hard surfaced
17/35	6,000 ft (1,800 m)	200 ft (61 m)	Hard surfaced
5/23	6,000 ft (1,800 m)	200 ft (61 m)	Hard surfaced

The northeast side of the facility was built to be a temporary RCAF base, complete with its own hangars and control tower, while the south side of the facility, built for the Americans, was being upgraded with its own aprons, hangars, earth-covered magazines, control tower and infrastructure. The Canadian and American bases were built as an RCAF station and later a United States Air Force base known as Goose AB, housing units of the Strategic Air Command and Aerospace Defense Command. It was later home to permanent detachments of the RAF, Luftwaffe, Aeronautica Militare, and Royal Netherlands Air Force, in addition to temporary deployments from several other NATO countries.

=== Cold War history ===
==== 1950 – The Rivière-du-Loup Incident ====
Goose Air Base was the site of the first US nuclear weapons in Canada, when in 1950 the United States Air Force Strategic Air Command (SAC) stationed 11 model 1561 Fat Man and Mark 4 atomic bombs at the base in the summer, and flew them out in December. While returning to Davis–Monthan Air Force Base with one of the bombs on board, a USAF B-50 heavy bomber encountered engine trouble, had to drop, and conventionally (non-nuclear) detonate, the bomb over the St. Lawrence, contaminating the river with uranium-238.

==== 1954 – Construction of the Strategic Air Command Weapons Storage Area ====
Construction of SAC's Weapons Storage Area at Goose Air Base was officially completed in 1954. The area was surrounded by two fences, topped with barbed wire. It was the highest security area in Goose Air Base and comprised

- One guard house
- One administration building
- Three warehouses (base spares #1, base spares #2, supply warehouse)
- Six guard towers
- One plant group building
- Five earth-covered magazines for non-nuclear weapon storage
- Four earth-covered magazines for "pit" storage (constructed with vaults and shelving to store pit "birdcages")

The design and layout of the Goose Air Base weapons storage area was identical, with only slight modifications for weather and terrain, to the three SAC weapons storage areas in Morocco located at Sidi Slimane Air Base, Ben Guerir Air Base, and Nouasseur Air Base, which were constructed between 1951 and 1952 as overseas operational storage sites. The last nuclear bomb components that were being stored at the Goose Air Base weapons storage area were removed in June 1971.

==== 1958 – Construction of the Air Defence Command ammunition storage area ====
Construction of the Air Defence Command ammunition storage area at Goose Air Base was completed in 1958. This extension to the SAC weapons storage area was built directly beside the previously constructed area, with a separate entrance. The buildings built within the area were:

- Three storage buildings
- One guardhouse
- One missile assembly building.

The storage was being built to accommodate components of the GAR-11/AIM-26 "Nuclear" Falcon, which is normally stored in pieces, requiring assembly before use.

==== 1976 – Departure of the USAF Strategic Air Command and closure of Goose AB ====
The former U.S. facilities were re-designated CFB Goose Bay (the second time this facility name has been used). The value of the airfield and facilities built and improved by the USAF since 1953 and transferred to Canada were estimated in excess of US$250 million (equivalent to $1.4 billion today). By 1976 all SAC assets had been stood down, and only USAF logistical and transport support remained.

==== 1980 – Multinational low-level flying training stepped up ====
In response to lessons learned from the Vietnam War and the growing sophistication of Soviet anti-aircraft radar and surface-to-air missile technology being deployed in Europe, NATO allies began looking at new doctrines in the 1970s–1980s which mandated low-level flight to evade detection. CFB Goose Bay's location in Labrador, with a population of around 30,000 and area of 294,000 km^{2} (114,000 sq mi), made it an ideal location for low-level flight training. Labrador's sparse settlement and a local topography similar to parts of the Soviet Union, in addition to proximity to European NATO nations caused CFB Goose Bay to grow and become the primary low-level tactical training area for several NATO air forces during the 1980s.

The increased low-level flights by fighter aircraft was not without serious controversy as the Innu Nation protested these operations vociferously, claiming that the noise of aircraft travelling at supersonic speeds in close proximity to the ground was adversely affecting wildlife, namely caribou, and was a nuisance to their way of life on their traditional lands.

During the 1980s–1990s, CFB Goose Bay hosted permanent detachments from the Royal Air Force, Luftwaffe, Royal Netherlands Air Force (RNLAF), and the Aeronautica Militare, in addition to temporary deployments from several other NATO countries. The permanent RNLAF detachment left CFB Goose Bay in the 1990s, although temporary training postings have been held since. Goose Bay was an attractive training facility for these air forces in light of the high population concentration in their countries, as well as numerous laws preventing low-level flying. The 13×10^{6} ha (130,000 km^{2}; 50,000 sq mi) bombing range is larger than several European countries. (Note: The thirteen-million-hectare (130,000 km^{2}) bombing range is larger than Iceland; Portugal; Serbia; Austria; the Czech Republic; Ireland; Slovakia; the Netherlands; Denmark; Switzerland; Belgium. see List of countries and dependencies by area.)

==== 1983 – The Space Shuttle Enterprise visits ====
In 1983, a NASA Boeing 747 transport aircraft carrying the Space Shuttle Enterprise landed at CFB Goose Bay to refuel on its way to a European tour where the prototype shuttle was then displayed in France and the United Kingdom. This was the first time that a U.S. Space Shuttle ever "landed" outside the United States. Goose Bay was also a designated emergency landing site for operational Space Shuttle missions, though this capability was never needed.

==== 1988 – Long-range radar closure ====
In 1988, the Pinetree Line radar site (Melville Air Station) adjacent to CFB Goose Bay was closed.

=== Post-Cold War history ===
==== 1990 – Gulf War ====
Goose Bay experienced a significant increase in traffic volume from USAF Military Airlift Command (MAC) during August 1990 due to Operation Desert Shield and Operation Desert Storm. At one point, MAC flights arrived at an average rate of two per hour; the normal rate was two to three per month. Part of the increase may have been driven by Hurricane Bertha, which occurred at the same time. The USAF deployed additional personnel to the base to assist managing the increased volume. Overall, operations proceeded smoothly as it resembled previous high-volume airlifts like Exercise Reforger.

==== 1993 – Base Rescue Flight and 444 Combat Support Squadron ====
To provide rescue and range support to the jet aircraft operating from Goose Bay, the Canadian Forces provided a Base Rescue Flight consisting of three CH-135 Twin Huey helicopters. In 1993 the Base Rescue Flight was re-badged as 444 Combat Support Squadron and continued to operate the same fleet of three helicopters. In 1996 the CH-135s were replaced with three CH-146 Griffon helicopters.

==== 2001 – 9/11 Operation Yellow Ribbon ====
On 11 September 2001, CFB Goose Bay hosted seven trans-Atlantic commercial airliners which were diverted to land as part of Operation Yellow Ribbon, following the closure of North American airspace as a result of the 9/11 terrorist attacks on the World Trade Center in New York City and the Pentagon in Washington, D.C. It was also the first Canadian airport to receive diverted aircraft.

==== 2005 – Cessation of Multinational Low Level Flying Training ====
In 2004 the RAF announced its intent to close the permanent RAF detachment, effective 31 March 2005. The German and Italian air forces had agreements signed to use the base until 2006, however they were not renewed as of 2004. These air forces still operate at Goose Bay, but plan to initiate simulator training instead. The base continues in its role as a low-level tactical training facility and as a forward deployment location for the RCAF, although the total complement of Canadian Forces personnel numbers less than 100.

==== 2005 – Ballistic missile defence ====
Labradorian politicians such as former Liberal Senator Bill Rompkey have advocated using CFB Goose Bay as a site for a missile defence radar system being developed by the United States Department of Defense. Executives from defence contractor Raytheon have surveyed CFB Goose Bay as a suitable location for deploying such a radar installation.

== Airlines and destinations ==
Civilian flights use a smaller terminal structure located on Zweibrucken Crescent. A new terminal structure was being built in 2012 to accommodate civilian use. The terminal has a single retail tenant, Flightline Café and Gifts with a Robin's Donuts shop.

An increasing number of airliners (especially mid-range aircraft like the Boeing 757) have resorted to using Goose Bay for unplanned fuel stops, especially common for trans-Atlantic flights impacted by a seasonally strong jet stream over the North Atlantic. The majority of civilian airliners using the airfield are not regularly scheduled airlines to this location.

Airlines	Destinations
Air Borealis	Hopedale, Makkovik, Nain, Natuashish, Postville
Air Canada Express	Halifax
PAL Airlines	Blanc-Sablon, Churchill Falls, Deer Lake, Gander, St. Anthony, St. John's, Wabush

Helicopter charters are operated by CHC Helicopter, Cougar Helicopters and Universal Helicopters.

Air Labrador was a tenant of the airport until the airline ceased operations in 2017 when it was merged with Innu Mikun Airlines as Air Borealis. It flew mainly from Goose Bay to remote communities in Newfoundland and Labrador and Quebec.

=== Historical airline service ===
In 1950, Trans-Canada Air Lines (TCA) was operating round trip transatlantic service via a stop at the airport with a routing of Montreal Dorval - Goose Bay - Glasgow Prestwick - London Airport flown with Canadair North Star aircraft which was a Canadian manufactured version of the Douglas DC-4. By 1962, Trans-Canada was serving Goose Bay with nonstop flights twice a week from Montreal Dorval operated with Vickers Vanguard turboprop aircraft. In 1981, Eastern Provincial Airways was the only airline serving Goose Bay with nonstop Boeing 737-200 jet service from Churchill Falls, Deer Lake, Halifax, Montreal Dorval, St. John's, Stephenville and Wabush although none of these flights were operated on a daily basis. By 1989, Canadian Airlines International was operating nonstop Boeing 737-200 jet service to Montreal Dorval four days a week. On January 23, 2021 Air Canada Express ended service from the airport to Halifax because of reduced demand due to the COVID-19 pandemic. Service returned on April 30, 2022.

== Units, squadrons and formations ==
The principal components of CFB Goose Bay are:

- 444 Combat Support Squadron
- 5 Wing Air Reserve Flight
- Forward Operating Location Goose Bay

== Fixed-base operators ==
The following fixed-base operators (FBOs) are based at CFB Goose Bay:

- PAL Airlines
- Canadian Helicopters
- Universal Helicopters

== Contamination ==
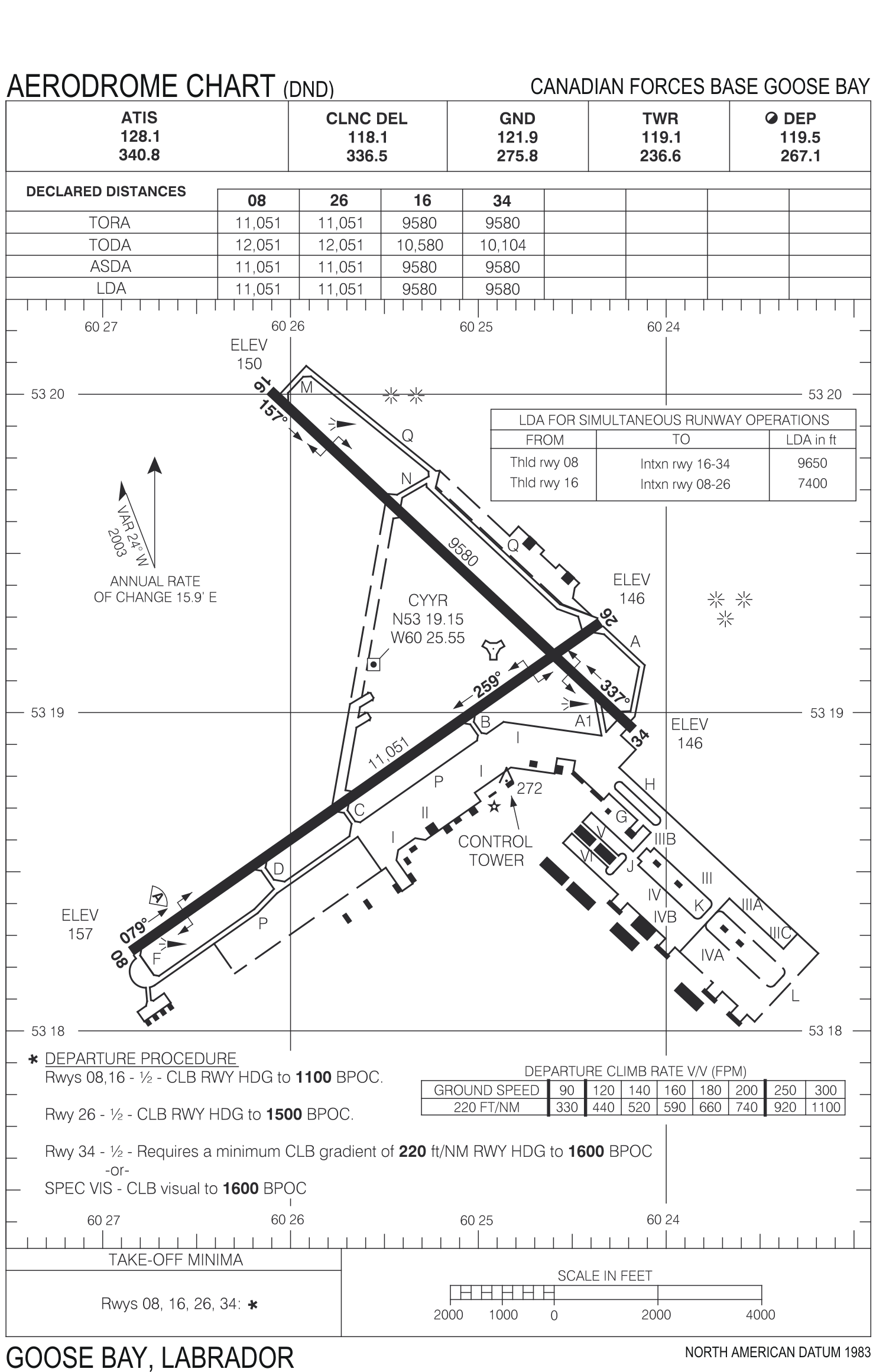
Aerodrome chart, CFB Goose Bay

The heavy contamination of the site and surrounding area is the result of decades of military operations. For many years waste material was disposed of on-site. The contamination is mostly due to the waste dumps and substance leaks from storage tanks, pipelines, and equipment. As a result, both the soil and groundwater of the site have been contaminated with polycyclic aromatic hydrocarbons, heavy metals, and polychlorinated biphenyls, among other hazardous substances. In addition, in 2014 it was estimated that there were over 1 million litres of undissolved petroleum before cleanup began. The contamination is spread over more than 100 individual sites on the base. Over time the contamination has spread from the base itself onto neighbouring private and provincially-owned land. In 2004 the groundwater pollution of the surrounding area had progressed to an extent that the Department of National Defence warned local farmers to avoid using wellwater until further testing was done.

=== Remediation ===
Work started on remediation in 2009 and is slated to be finished in 2028. As of 2022, the federal government has spent $142.9 million on remediating the site. One of the dumps has been transformed into an engineered wetland as part of the efforts to filter out contaminants from the water. In addition, over 46,000 m^{3} of contaminated soil has been cleaned and returned to the site. Over 700,000 litres of hydrocarbons have been recuperated and over 5 million litres of contaminated groundwater have been treated.

A number of different technologies have been employed in the site clean-up, such as dual phase vacuum extraction.

== Incidents ==
- On 10 December 1947, a Douglas C-54D-5-DC of the United States Air Force (USAF) crashed and burned in a wooded area shortly after taking off from Goose Bay resulting in 23 fatalities.
- The Boeing B-50 Superfortress of the Rivière-du-Loup nuclear weapon incident on 10 November 1950 departed Goose AFB to return a US Mark 4 nuclear bomb to Davis–Monthan Air Force Base.
- On 14 May 1951, a RCAF Douglas C-47A-10-DK disintegrated in-flight and crashed killing four crew members.
- On 21 July 1952, a RCAF Douglas C-47A-30-DL crashed while engaged on insect spraying operations near Goose Bay. The crew of three were killed.
- On 10 April 1956, a RCAF de Havilland Canada U-1A Otter crashed after takeoff on runway 09 killing three.
- On 6 July 1956, a USAF Boeing KC-97 Stratofreighter caught fire while descending to Goose AFB on a flight from Lake Charles, Louisiana. The airplane crashed 72 km northeast of Goose Bay killing all six crew members.
- On 7 November 1964, a USAF Douglas C-133A Cargomaster stalled at full power after takeoff and crashed killing seven crew members.
- On 11 October 1984, a de Havilland Canada DHC-6 Twin Otter 100 of Labrador Airways flying on a medevac flight from St. Anthony crashed upon landing at Goose Bay killing four.
- On 10 May 1990, a General Dynamics F-16A Fighting Falcon (J-358) of the Royal Netherlands Air Force (RNLAF) collided in mid-air with another RNLAF F-16A (78-0258, J-258) 13 km (8.1 mi) west of Grand Lake killing its pilot. The pilot of the J-258 ejected safely.
- On 8 February 1991, a Cessna 208B Grand Caravan of Provincial Airlines impacted the ground on approach to Goose Bay killing the pilot.
- On 22 April 1993, a McDonnell Douglas F-4F Phantom II of the Luftwaffe hit the ground while flying a roll at 150 m (490 ft) during an airshow practice routine killing both crew.
- On 30 September 2017, Air France Flight 66, an Engine Alliance GP7270 powered Airbus A380, safely diverted to the base.
- On 14 December 2022, a Piper PA-46 from Sept-Îles to Nuuk crashed 5 km (3 mi) west of the airport on approach to runway 08. The two occupants sustained serious injuries and were transported to the local hospital. The pilot later died of his injuries.
- On 19 April 2024, Hangar 8 and the old control tower on top of that hangar was destroyed in a structural fire. A survey the next morning found large pieces of metal debris due to explosions inside the hangar.

== Historic place ==
Hangar 8 at CFB Goose Bay was designated as a Canadian historic place in 2004. The old, no longer in use control tower and connected hangar suffered structural damage in a fire in April 2024.

== See also ==
- Goose (Otter Creek) Water Aerodrome
- List of United States Air Force Aerospace Defense Command Interceptor Squadrons
