= Labrador City =

- Town
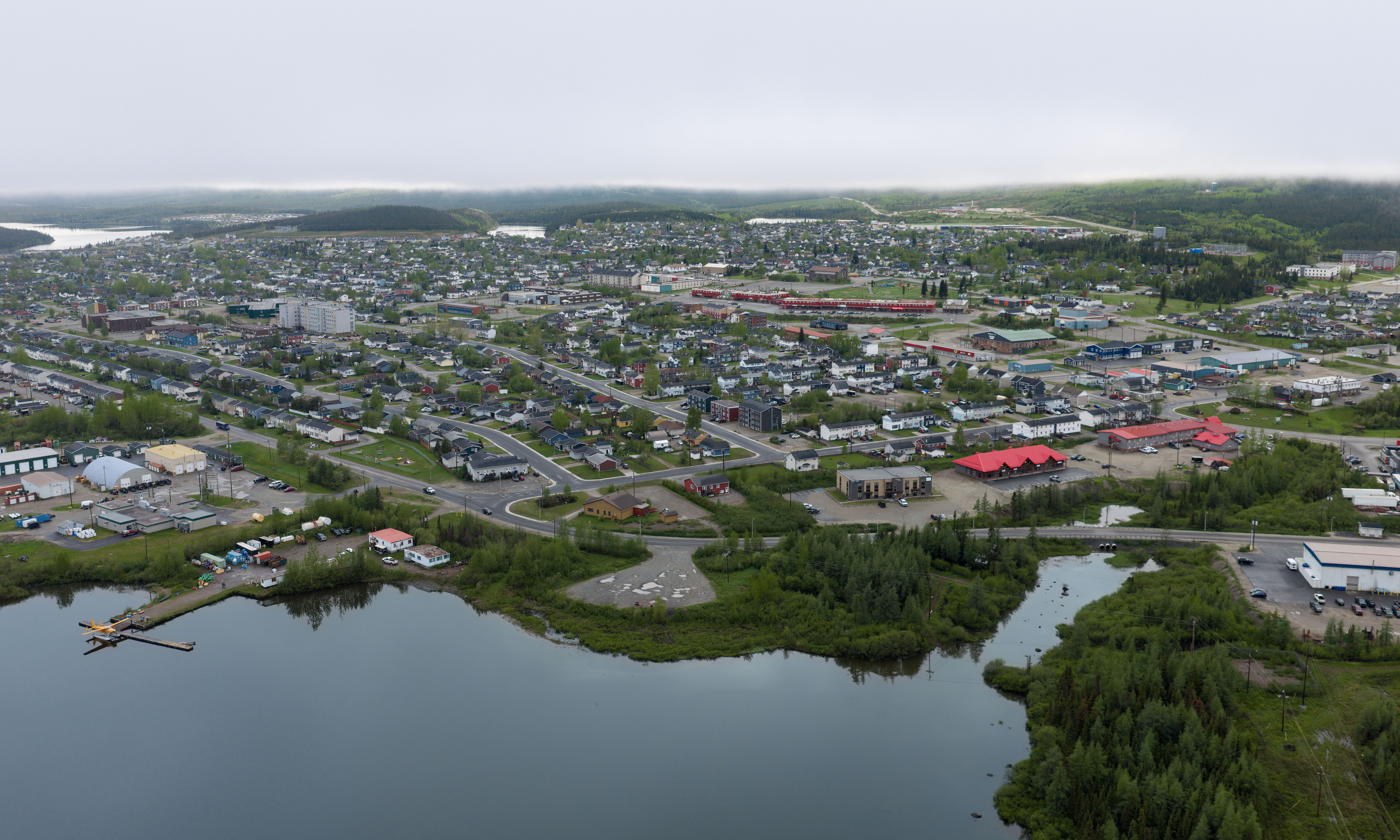
- Aerial view (2026)

- Seal Coat of arms
- Motto(s): Kamistiatusset (Naskapi) (English: "Land of the Hard-Working People")
- Location of Labrador City in Labrador
- Coordinates: 52°57′N 66°55′W
- Country: Canada
- Province: Newfoundland and Labrador
- Census division: 10
- Settled: 1960s

Government
  - Type: Labrador City Town Council
  - Mayor: Jordan Brown
  - MHA: Joseph Power
  - MP: Philip Earle

Area
  - Total: 38.83 km^{2} (14.99 sq mi)
- Elevation: 555 m (1,821 ft)

Population (2021 census)
  - Total: 7,412
  - Density: 186/km^{2} (480/sq mi)
- Time zone: UTC-4 (AST)
  - Summer (DST): UTC-3 (Atlantic Daylight Saving Time)
- Postal code span: A2V
- Area code: 709
- Highways: Route 500 (Trans-Labrador Highway)
- Website: www.labradorwest.com

Labrador City is a town in western Labrador (part of the Canadian province of Newfoundland and Labrador), near the Quebec border. With a population of 7,412 as of 2021, it is the second-largest population centre in Labrador, behind Happy Valley-Goose Bay. Neighbouring Labrador City is Wabush, a smaller town with a population of approximately 1,964 as of 2021. Together, the "twin towns" are known as Labrador West.

In the 1960s, Labrador City was founded to accommodate employees of the Iron Ore Company of Canada; iron ore mining continues to be the primary industry in the town.

The Labrador City town motto is Kamistiatusset, a Naskapi word meaning "land of the hard-working people." The Labrador City town crest is that of a snowy owl holding a scroll atop a black spade on a mound of red earth. The symbol represents iron ore mining. The spade is flanked by two caribou. Both snowy owls and caribou are native to the Labrador City area.

== Government ==
Since the 2025 election, the federal riding of Labrador seat has been held by Philip Earle, a Liberal Party member while Progressive Conservative Joseph Power has represented Labrador West in the provincial House of Assembly since 2025.

Jordan Brown is currently the Mayor of Labrador City.

== Economy ==
Labrador City was built around the rich iron ore deposits of the Labrador Trough by the Iron Ore Company of Canada (IOC) in the 1960s. The Carol Project is the major iron ore mining operation for the area. In 2008, IOC and their parent company Rio Tinto announced they would spend $800 million to develop additional mines in the region. However, only a few months after announcing the second phase of their expansion, the project was shelved due to the economic recession and low demand for steel.

The town is serviced by the Wabush Airport, and the airlines flying out of the airport are Provincial Airlines, Air Inuit and Pascan Aviation. Additionally, the Quebec North Shore and Labrador Railway provides freight rail transportation to and from Sept-Îles. The Trans-Labrador Highway (Route 500) serves as the only road connection to Labrador City, connecting it with the rest of Labrador as well as the neighbouring province of Quebec, becoming Quebec Route 389 at the border.

The town contains many amenities found in larger locations thanks to investments by the mining companies who established the area including an ice arena, curling, downhill & cross country ski clubs. The White wolf snowmobile club connects with a larger trail network across the region and is home to the Cain's Quest Snowmobile Endurance Race.

The main shopping mall in the town, the 22,940-square-metre (246,923 sq ft) Labrador Mall, includes a Walmart, Canadian Tire and Mark's. The mall opened in 1978 and is the largest shopping mall in Labrador; it is also the only enclosed mall in Labrador.

There is a Masonic lodge in Labrador City, Lodge Anik No 1707 of the District Grand Lodge of Newfoundland and Labrador of the Grand Lodge of Scotland.

== Demographics ==
Historical populations
Year	Pop.	±%
1971	7,622	—
1976	12,012	+57.6%
1981	11,538	−3.9%
1986	8,665	−24.9%
1991	9,061	+4.6%
1996	8,455	−6.7%
2001	7,744	−8.4%
2006	7,240	−6.5%
2011	7,367	+1.8%
2016	7,220	−2.0%
2021	7,412	+2.7%

In the 2021 Census of Population conducted by Statistics Canada, Labrador City had a population of 7,412 living in 3,070 of its 3,368 total private dwellings, a change of 2.7% from its 2016 population of 7,220. With a land area of 34.11 km^{2} (13.17 sq mi), it had a population density of 217.3/km^{2} (562.8/sq mi) in 2021.

Canada 2016 Census		Population	% of Total Population
Visible minority group Source:	South Asian	25	0.3%
Visible minority group Source:	Chinese	25	0.3%
Visible minority group Source:	Filipino	250	3.5%
Visible minority group Source:	Arab	1	0%
Visible minority group Source:	Other visible minority	10	0.1%
Visible minority group Source:	Mixed visible minority	10	0.1%
Total visible minority population		330	4.6%
Aboriginal group Source:	First Nations	170	2.4%
Aboriginal group Source:	Métis	295	4.1%
Aboriginal group Source:	Inuit	125	1.7%
Aboriginal group Source:	Other Aboriginal	30	0.4%
Total Aboriginal population		630	8.7%
White		6,230	86.3%
Total population		7,220	100%

== Attractions ==
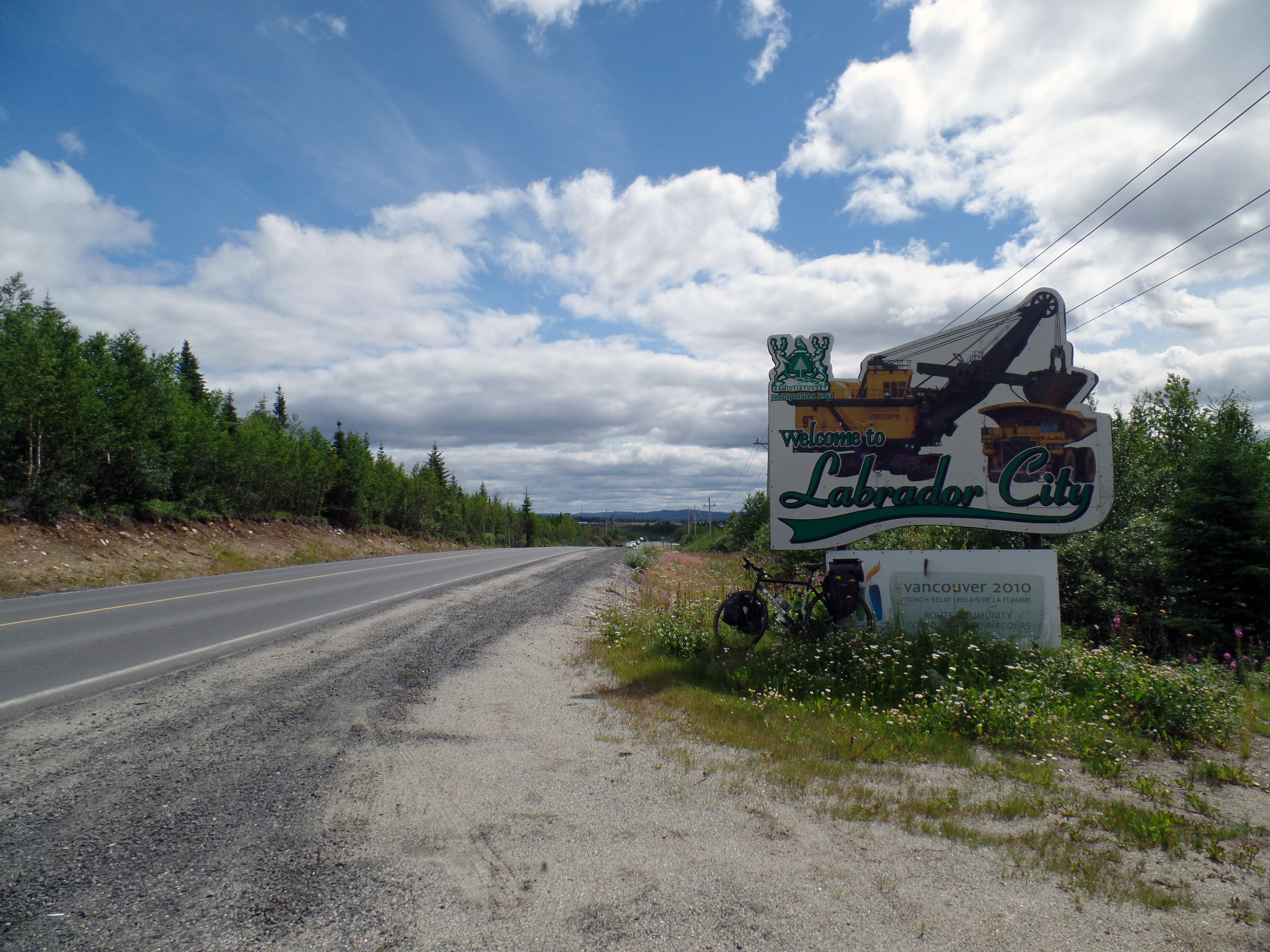
Welcome sign

- Basilica of our Lady of Perpetual Help

== Climate ==
Wabush and Labrador City have a continental subarctic climate (Köppen: Dfc), with cool to mild summers and severely cold winters. Precipitation is heavy year round (although higher in summer) due to the strong Icelandic Low to the east driving cold, moist and unstable air onto the region. Snowfall, as is typical for the province, is very heavy for seven months each year and depths can reach as high as 218 centimetres (85.83 in). Despite its latitude around the same as cities like Berlin, London, and Amsterdam, its annual mean temperature is 13 °C (23 °F) colder.

Climate data for Wabush Airport (1991–2020 normals, extremes 1960–present)
Month	Jan	Feb	Mar	Apr	May	Jun	Jul	Aug	Sep	Oct	Nov	Dec	Year
Record high humidex	7.7	5.9	14.6	16.9	35.0	37.1	39.0	35.3	32.2	22.6	13.8	7.1	39.0
Record high °C (°F)	8.0 (46.4)	6.2 (43.2)	14.7 (58.5)	17.4 (63.3)	28.8 (83.8)	33.3 (91.9)	32.6 (90.7)	30.6 (87.1)	29.5 (85.1)	21.1 (70.0)	12.2 (54.0)	7.2 (45.0)	33.3 (91.9)
Mean maximum °C (°F)	−1.8 (28.8)	−2.8 (27.0)	5.0 (41.0)	11.2 (52.2)	21.7 (71.1)	27.1 (80.8)	27.4 (81.3)	26.3 (79.3)	22.7 (72.9)	14.3 (57.7)	5.9 (42.6)	0.8 (33.4)	29.1 (84.4)
Mean daily maximum °C (°F)	−16.2 (2.8)	−14.3 (6.3)	−6.8 (19.8)	1.3 (34.3)	9.8 (49.6)	16.7 (62.1)	19.6 (67.3)	18.2 (64.8)	12.4 (54.3)	4.5 (40.1)	−3.7 (25.3)	−11.1 (12.0)	2.5 (36.5)
Daily mean °C (°F)	−21.7 (−7.1)	−20.6 (−5.1)	−13.7 (7.3)	−4.5 (23.9)	4.1 (39.4)	10.7 (51.3)	14.1 (57.4)	13.1 (55.6)	7.8 (46.0)	1.0 (33.8)	−7.5 (18.5)	−15.9 (3.4)	−2.8 (27.0)
Mean daily minimum °C (°F)	−27.1 (−16.8)	−26.9 (−16.4)	−20.5 (−4.9)	−10.2 (13.6)	−1.6 (29.1)	4.7 (40.5)	8.2 (46.8)	7.9 (46.2)	3.2 (37.8)	−2.4 (27.7)	−11.3 (11.7)	−20.7 (−5.3)	−8.0 (17.6)
Mean minimum °C (°F)	−39.4 (−38.9)	−39.0 (−38.2)	−36.1 (−33.0)	−24.1 (−11.4)	−9.5 (14.9)	−2.0 (28.4)	2.7 (36.9)	1.6 (34.9)	−3.2 (26.2)	−11.0 (12.2)	−24.6 (−12.3)	−35.2 (−31.4)	−40.8 (−41.4)
Record low °C (°F)	−44.1 (−47.4)	−46.8 (−52.2)	−41.6 (−42.9)	−36.4 (−33.5)	−13.4 (7.9)	−6.9 (19.6)	0.1 (32.2)	−1.2 (29.8)	−8.1 (17.4)	−22.4 (−8.3)	−33.6 (−28.5)	−42.5 (−44.5)	−46.8 (−52.2)
Record low wind chill	−62.8	−58.2	−52.6	−43.4	−32.6	−11.8	—	−6.2	−13.9	−28.1	−43.9	−59.5	−62.8
Average precipitation mm (inches)	48.7 (1.92)	38.1 (1.50)	52.3 (2.06)	47.9 (1.89)	55.0 (2.17)	88.7 (3.49)	113.5 (4.47)	119.9 (4.72)	90.8 (3.57)	80.6 (3.17)	72.2 (2.84)	52.5 (2.07)	860.1 (33.86)
Average rainfall mm (inches)	0.8 (0.03)	1.8 (0.07)	3.1 (0.12)	11.8 (0.46)	42.0 (1.65)	85.7 (3.37)	112.1 (4.41)	119.6 (4.71)	86.7 (3.41)	45.1 (1.78)	14.7 (0.58)	3.6 (0.14)	526.8 (20.74)
Average snowfall cm (inches)	70.7 (27.8)	56.7 (22.3)	71.4 (28.1)	47.7 (18.8)	13.9 (5.5)	1.2 (0.5)	0.0 (0.0)	0.3 (0.1)	3.4 (1.3)	38.9 (15.3)	80.2 (31.6)	74.8 (29.4)	458.9 (180.7)
Average precipitation days (≥ 0.2 mm)	18.1	14.0	14.7	14.0	15.3	17.4	19.3	20.7	20.3	21.1	20.8	18.5	214.1
Average rainy days	0.9	0.9	1.4	3.8	12.5	16.7	19.3	20.7	19.7	11.9	4.8	1.7	114.3
Average snowy days (≥ 0.2 cm)	19.6	15.4	16.2	12.7	9.3	0.91	0.05	0.05	2.0	13.5	20.8	20.7	128.0
Average relative humidity (%) (at 15:00 LST)	67.8	61.0	58.4	58.0	54.4	54.4	58.3	61.2	64.9	71.6	77.8	75.3	63.6
Average dew point °C (°F)	−25.0 (−13.0)	−24.3 (−11.7)	−17.5 (0.5)	−9.2 (15.4)	−1.8 (28.8)	4.6 (40.3)	8.8 (47.8)	8.6 (47.5)	4.0 (39.2)	−2.0 (28.4)	−9.4 (15.1)	−18.7 (−1.7)	−6.7 (19.9)
Mean monthly sunshine hours	98.0	132.2	151.3	180.1	210.6	212.5	218.0	202.7	116.6	75.4	56.9	67.3	1,721.4
Percentage possible sunshine	38.6	47.6	41.2	43.1	43.0	42.1	43.0	44.4	30.6	22.9	21.7	28.3	37.2
Source 1: Environment Canada
Source 2: weatherstats.ca (for dewpoint and monthly&yearly average absolute maximum&minimum temperature)

== See also ==
- List of cities and towns in Newfoundland and Labrador
- Wabush, neighbouring twin town of Labrador City
- Fermont, nearest town in Quebec

== Notable residents ==
Notable former residents of Labrador City include:

- Damhnait Doyle, singer-songwriter
- Margot Kidder, actress
- Dan LaCosta, National Hockey League goaltender
- Pascal Pelletier, National Hockey League player
- Chad Penney, National Hockey League player
- Mark Nichols, 2006 Turin Olympics gold medallist curler
