= Wabush Airport =

Airport in Wabush, Newfoundland and Labrador, Canada

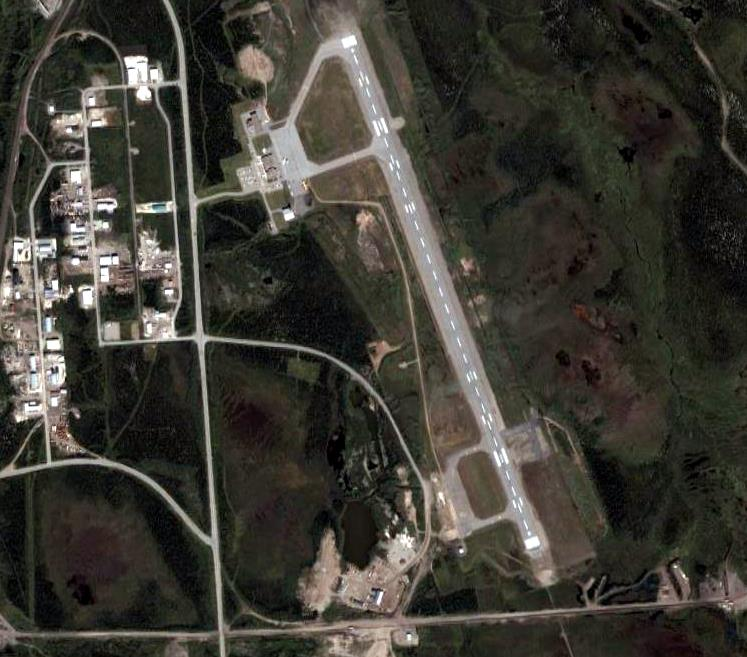
- IATA: YWK; ICAO: CYWK; WMO: 71825

Summary
- Airport type: Public
- Operator: Transport Canada
- Serves: Labrador City
- Location: Wabush, Newfoundland and Labrador, Canada
- Operating base for: PAL Airlines
- Time zone: AST (UTC−04:00)
  - Summer (DST): ADT (UTC−03:00)
- Elevation AMSL: 1,809 ft / 551 m
- Coordinates: 52°55′22″N 066°51′53″W

Map
- Location in Newfoundland and Labrador

Runways
| Direction | Length | | Surface |
| Direction | ft | m | Surface |
|---|---|---|---|
| 18/36 | 6,002 | 1,829 | Asphalt |

Statistics (2010)
- Aircraft movements: 11,663
- Sources: Canada Flight Supplement; Environment Canada; Movements from Statistics Canada

Wabush Airport (IATA: YWK, ICAO: CYWK) is 1 nautical mile (1.9 km; 1.2 mi) northeast of Wabush, Newfoundland and Labrador, Canada. It serves Labrador West including Labrador City and Wabush as well as Fermont, Quebec.

== Airlines and destinations ==
| Airlines | Destinations |
|---|---|
| PAL Airlines | Churchill Falls, Deer Lake (NL), Gander, Goose Bay, Moncton, Mont-Joli, Montréal–Trudeau, Québec City, St. John's, Sept-Îles |

The airport is also served by private charter flights, most notably Norlinor Aviation, that provide travel for contractors working at both mines using Boeing 737 aircraft.

Prior to December 2023, the airport was also serviced by Pascan Aviation. Air Canada also provided service through Jazz Aviation, operating under the Air Canada Express banner, but all flights ceased during the COVID-19 pandemic.

=== Historical airline service ===
According to the Official Airline Guide (OAG), the Wabush Airport was served by several airlines operating scheduled passenger jet flights during the 1970s including Eastern Provincial Airways operating Boeing 737-200 jets with nonstop flights from Churchill Falls, Labrador and Goose Bay, Labrador as well as direct, no change of plane jet service from Deer Lake, Newfoundland, Gander, Newfoundland, St. John's, Newfoundland and Stephenville, Newfoundland, and Quebecair operating Boeing 727-100 and British Aircraft Corporation BAC One-Eleven jets with nonstop service from Montreal, Quebec, Gagnon, Quebec, Schefferville, Quebec and Sept-Iles, Quebec as well as direct, no change of plane jet service from Mont Joli, Quebec and Quebec City, Quebec.

== See also ==
- Wabush Water Aerodrome
