= Deer Lake Regional Airport =

Airport in Newfoundland and Labrador

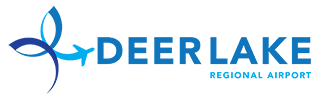

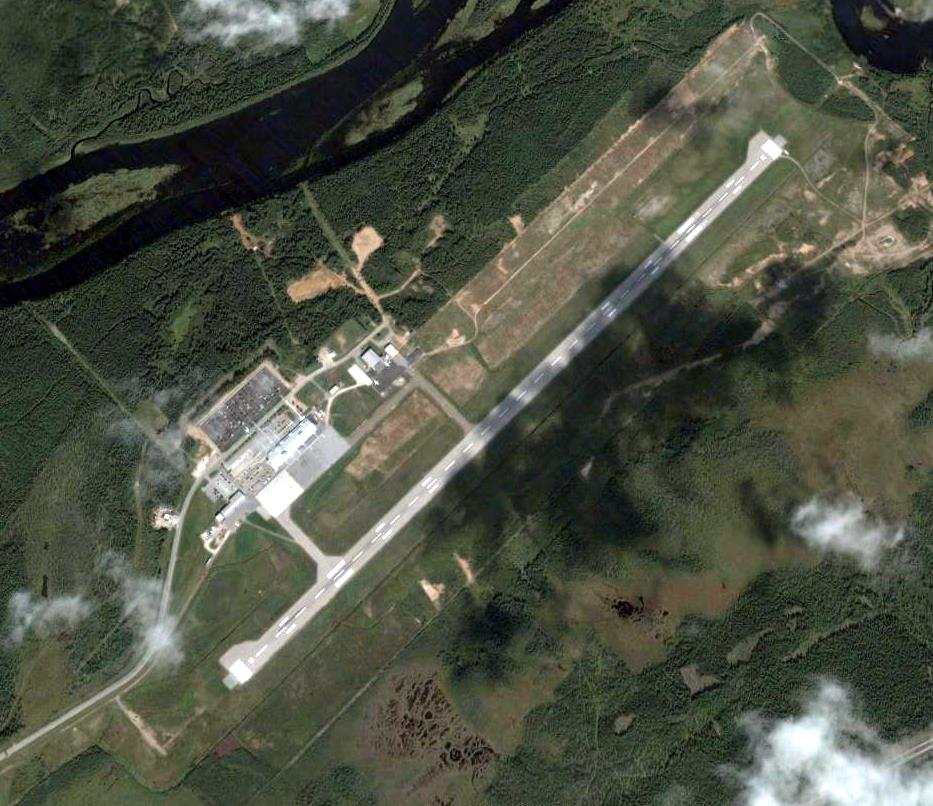
- IATA: YDF; ICAO: CYDF; WMO: 71809

Summary
- Airport type: Public
- Operator: Deer Lake Regional Airport Authority
- Location: Deer Lake, Newfoundland and Labrador
- Time zone: NST (UTC−03:30)
  - Summer (DST): NDT (UTC−02:30)
- Elevation AMSL: 72 ft (22 m)
- Coordinates: 49°12′33″N 057°23′40″W
- Website: www.deerlakeairport.com

Map
- Location within Newfoundland and Labrador Location within Canada

Runways
Direction	Length		Surface
Direction	ft	m	Surface
07/25	8,005	2,440	Asphalt concrete

Statistics (2024)
- Aircraft movements: 14,001
- Sources: Canada Flight Supplement; Environment Canada; Movements from Statistics Canada

Deer Lake Regional Airport (IATA: YDF, ICAO: CYDF) is located 3 nautical miles (5.6 km; 3.5 mi) north northeast of Deer Lake, Newfoundland and Labrador, Canada. It is currently run by the Deer Lake Regional Airport Authority and is the closest airport to Gros Morne National Park and Corner Brook. After St. John's International Airport, it is the second busiest airport in Newfoundland and Labrador. Deer Lake Regional Airport serves 300,000 passengers annually. Deer Lake Airport serves a large area of Newfoundland, from the Great Northern Peninsula to Channel-Port aux Basques.

== History ==
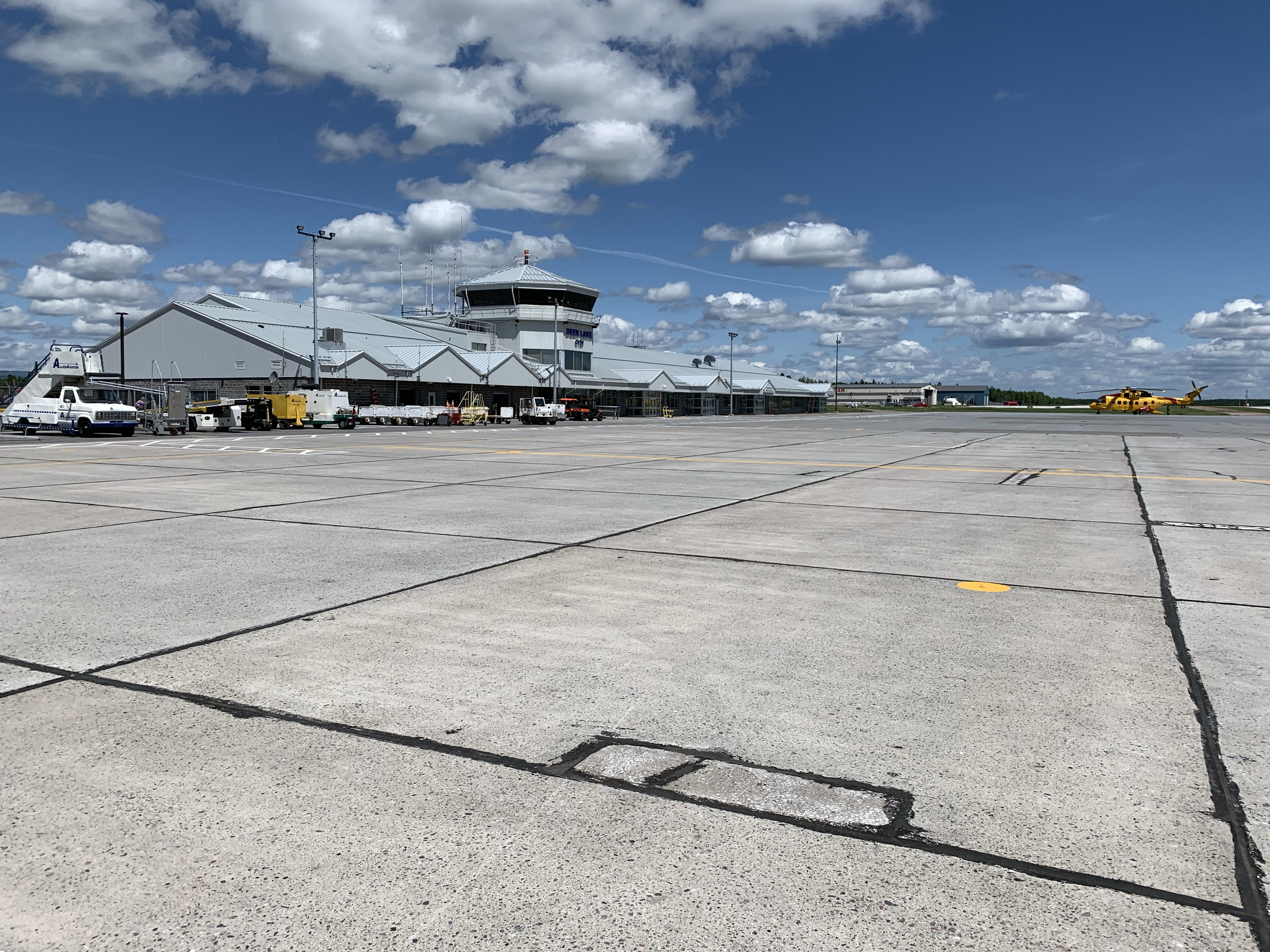
Deer Lake Regional Airport, as seen from the aircraft stands

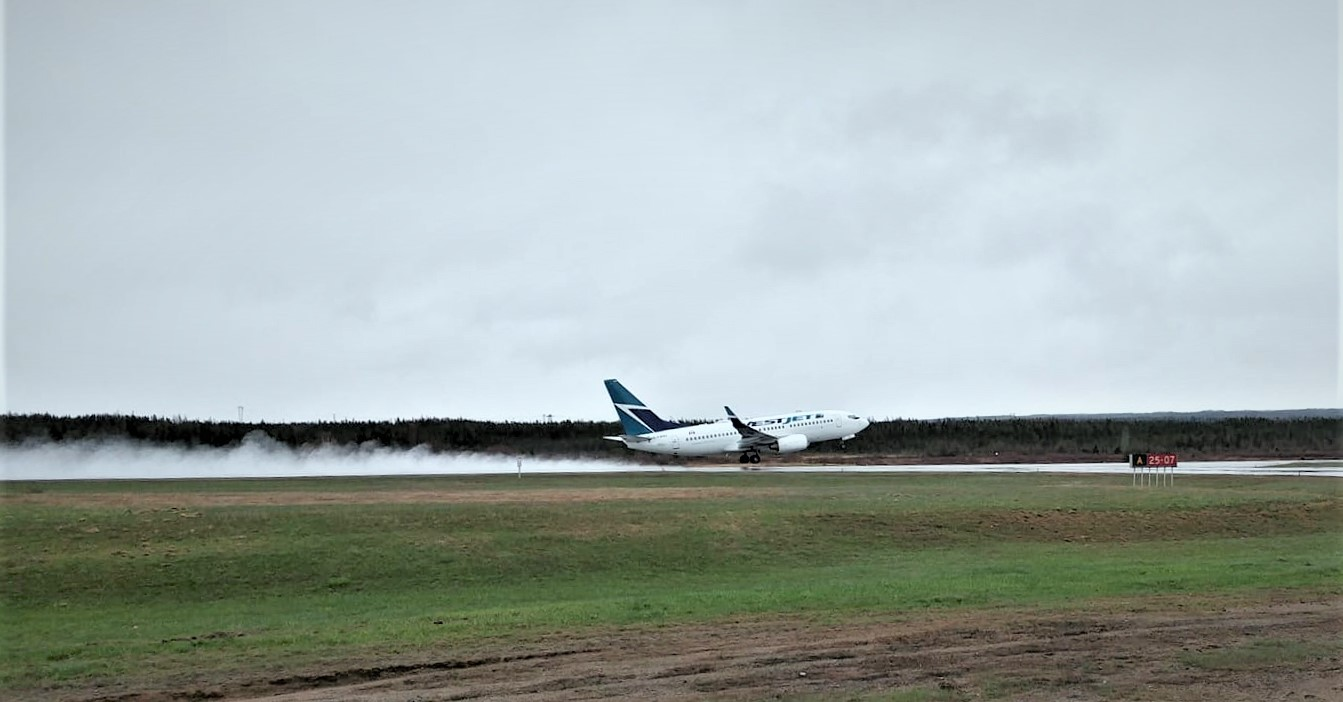
A WestJet Boeing 737-700 taking off from Deer Lake Airport

Deer Lake Airport dates back to 1953. Construction began in 1953; by the autumn of 1955, a 4,000 ft (1,200 m) gravel strip was in operation. In 1959, the strip was extended to 5,000 ft (1,500 m) and paved in 1963. Eastern Provincial Airways began jet service using Boeing 737-200 aircraft in July 1969. Construction of a new terminal started in 1990 and was completed the following year. Deer Lake Regional Airport's 8,005 ft (2,440 m) runway is capable of handling daily service of Beechcraft 1900, Bombardier Dash 8, Bombardier CRJ200, Airbus A319, Airbus A321, and Boeing 737 Next Generation aircraft.

In 2020, as a result of the COVID-19 pandemic, the airport suffered notable cuts to its airline routes.

== Facilities ==
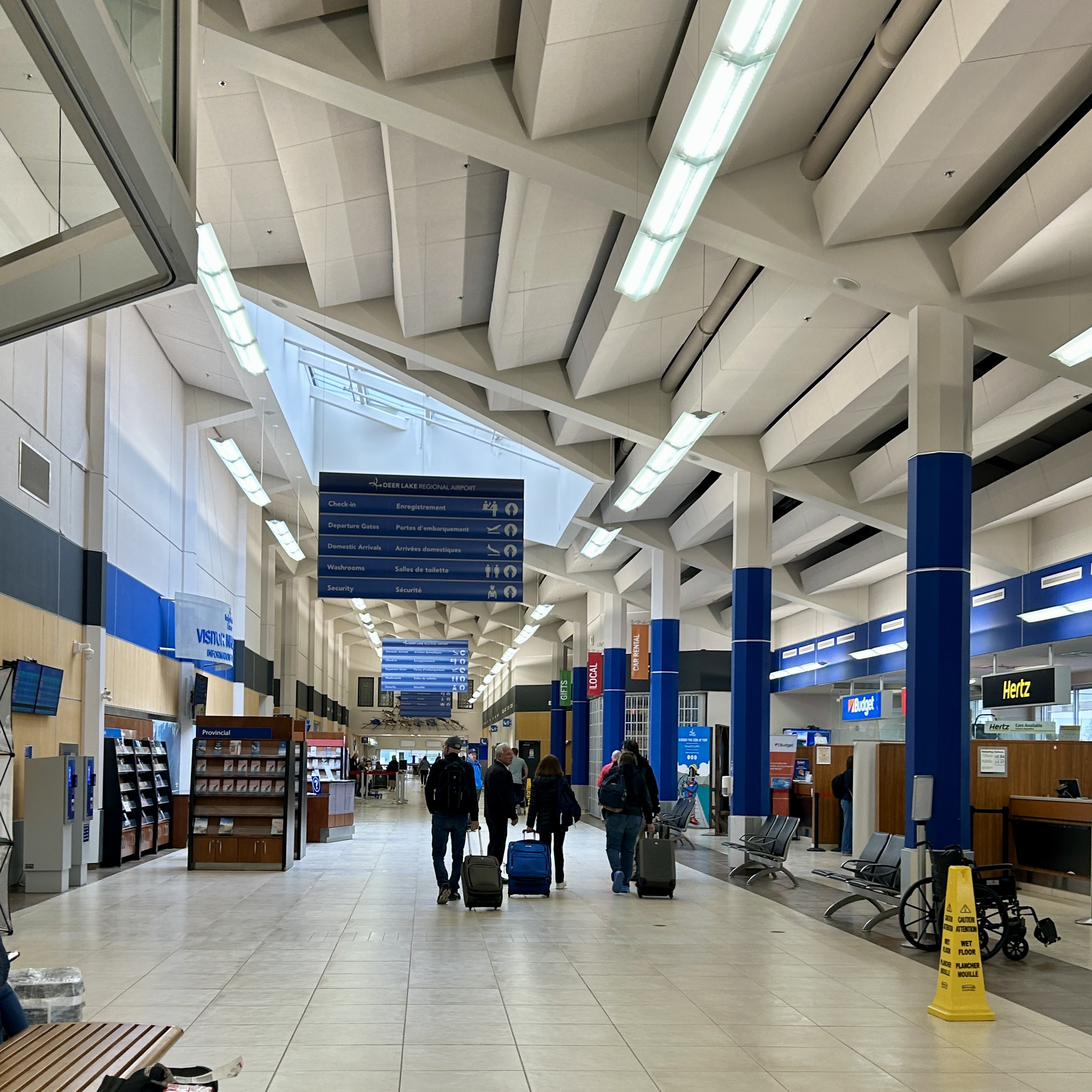
Interior of Deer Lake Regional Airport terminal.

The terminal is equipped with a restaurant, gift shop and other amenities. A large long-term parking lot is located on-site.

The airport is equipped with seven aircraft gates which are able to stand aircraft from the Beech 1900 to the Airbus widebody aircraft. Throughout the year the airport is equipped with deicing facilities. The airport also is considered as an airport of entry by the CBSA and therefore offers customs and border patrol services during select months throughout the year. CBSA officers can only handle flights with up to 120 passengers or up to 250 if they are offloaded in stages.

== Airlines and destinations ==
=== Passenger ===
Airlines	Destinations
Air Canada Express	Halifax, Montréal–Trudeau
Air Canada Rouge	Toronto–Pearson
PAL Airlines	Goose Bay, Moncton, St. Anthony, St. John's, Wabush; Seasonal: Gander
Porter Airlines	Seasonal: Halifax, Ottawa, Toronto–Pearson
WestJet	Seasonal: Calgary, Cancún

== Fixed-base operators (FBOs), ground handling services ==
- Nalair
- Allied Aviation Services
- Menzies Aviation
- Woodward Aviation
