= Universal Helicopters =

Canadian helicopter operator

Universal Helicopters Group

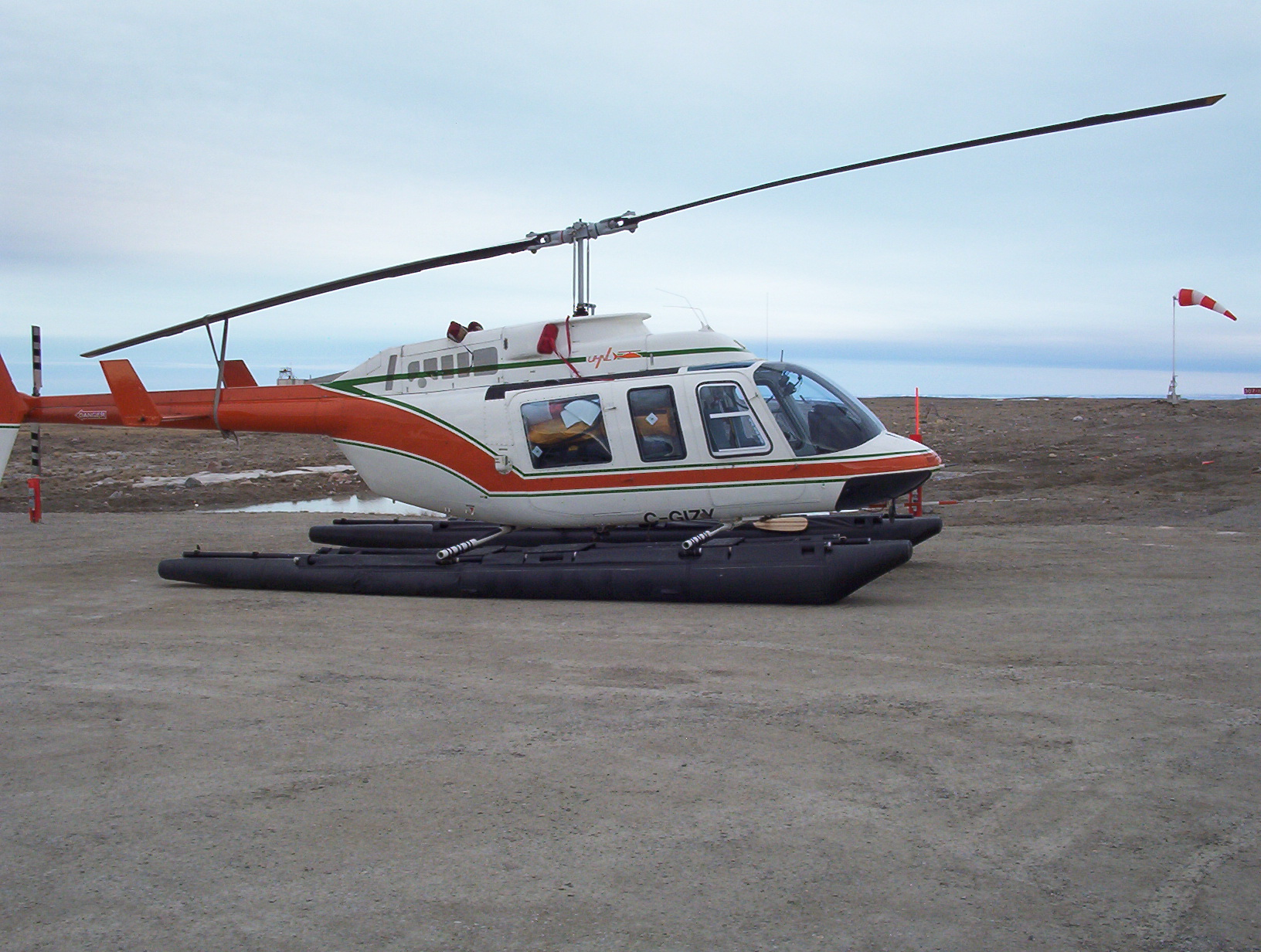
- A Bell 206 at Cambridge Bay Airport
- Founded: 1963
- Ceased operations: 2020
- AOC #: 18146
- Operating bases: Happy Valley-Goose Bay, St. John's, Pasadena, Gander, Lakelse Air Bases in Terrace, Dease Lake, Prince Rupert, Hazelton
- Fleet size: 21, 35
- Headquarters: St. John's, Newfoundland
- Key people: Shane Cyr, President and COO
- Website: http://www.uhgroup.ca/

Universal Helicopters was a commercial helicopter company located in Newfoundland and Labrador, Canada. While operating primarily in Newfoundland and Labrador with operations sometimes extending into the Ungava Peninsula and the Arctic, Universal Helicopters held an International Operating Certificate and completed several contracts in Greenland.

== History ==
The company started operations in 1963 and was a subsidiary of Okanagan Helicopters. It was last owned by a partnership of companies formed by Nunatsiavut Group of Companies, Tasiujatsoak Trust and CAPE Fund.

On September 10, 2018, the company announced it had finalized the purchase of Lakelse Air, as part of plan to double their revenue. Based in Northwest British Columbia, Lakelse Air had been seen as a strategic purchase to build and strengthen Indigenous relations across Canada for future job prospects. Shortly after acquiring Lakelse Air, Universal Helicopters began shifting its focus to work internationally and overseas. Pushing for Global growth along with their September 6, 2018 investment in South Coast Helicopters proved to be unsustainable, leading to their eventual financial difficulty.

The company announced its sudden closure due to financial insolvency on May 27, 2020.

== Bases ==
Universal Helicopters corporate head office, main stores and accounting services were situated in Goose Bay, Labrador with other bases situated at St. John's, Pasadena and Gander. Each location had permanent base personnel and hangar support facilities for year-round operations and maintenance.

== Fleet ==
Universal Helicopters had the following aircraft registered with Transport Canada:

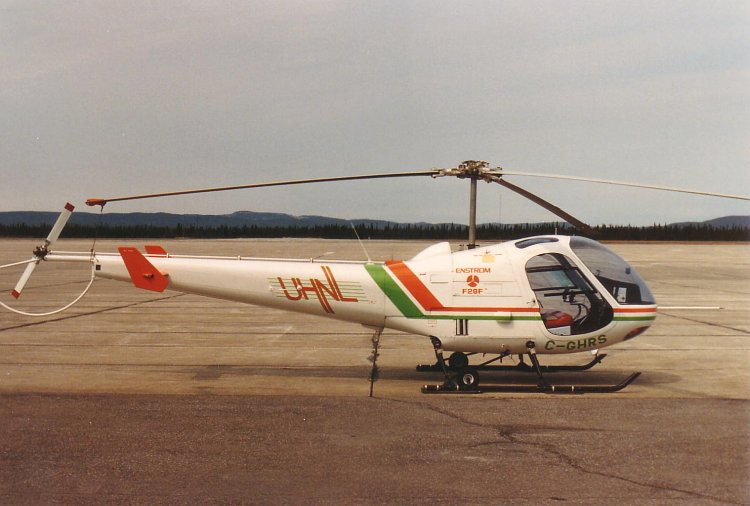
An Enstrom F-28F used by Universal Helicopters for training, 1988

Aircraft	No. of aircraft	Variants	Notes
Aerospatiale AS350	5	AS350B, AS350 B2, AS350 B3, AS350 BA	Listed at Universal as Airbus
Bell 206	10	LongRanger	Nine Bell 206L LongRanger and one Bell 206L-4 LongRanger IV
Bell 212	1	Bell 212	Not listed at the Universal site
Bell 407	5	-	

The Transport Canada list also shows that they once had a Bell 407.

== Customer reception ==
The Government of Newfoundland and Labrador had had extensive contracts with the company, using them for medical evacuation, clinic support, forest fire surveillance and suppression, aerial searching, survey and mapping and personnel transport.

== See also ==
- History of aviation in Canada
- List of defunct airlines of Canada
