= Ossokmanuan Lake =

- Location within Newfoundland and Labrador
- Location: Labrador, Newfoundland and Labrador, Canada
- Coordinates: 53°31′10″N 65°05′57″W
- Type: reservoir
- Basin countries: Canada

Ossokmanuan Lake is a reservoir lake in western Labrador, Newfoundland and Labrador, Canada. It was formed in the early 1960s by the Twin Falls hydroelectric plant. In 1976 it had a reported 2.8×10^{9} m^{3} (9.9×10^{10} cu ft) of active storage.
