= Nipishish Lake =

- Location within Newfoundland and Labrador
- Location: Labrador, Newfoundland and Labrador, Canada
- Coordinates: 54°12′N 60°47′W
- Type: lake
- Basin countries: Canada

Nipishish Lake is a lake in central Labrador, Canada.
