= Wabush =

- Town
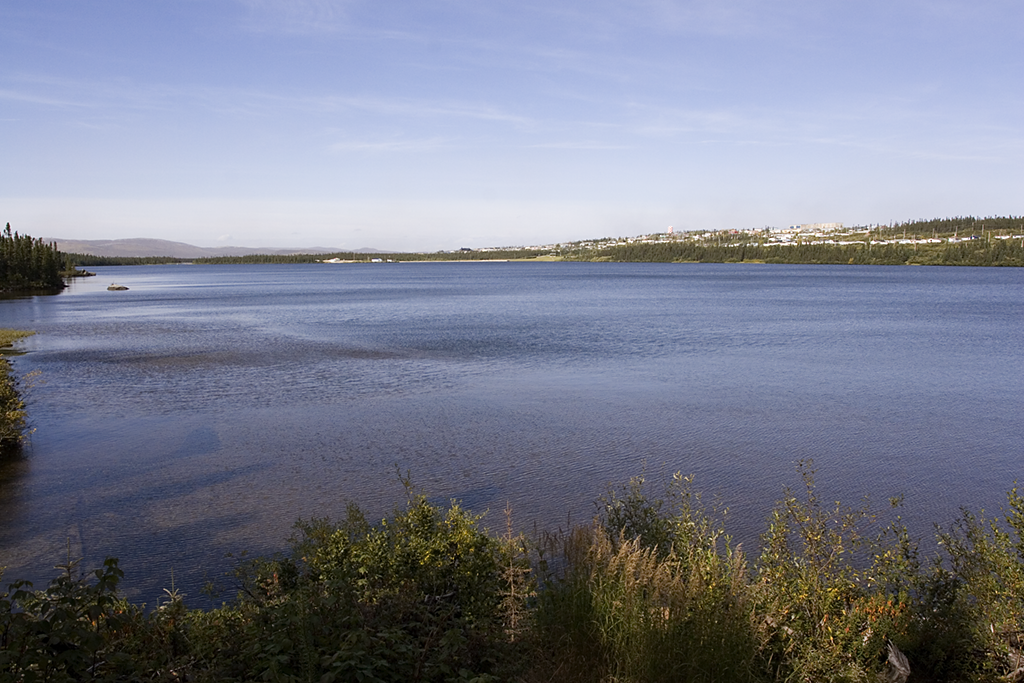
- Town of Wabush across Jean Lake

- Flag Coat of arms
- Motto: "Terra Progredimur" (Latin) "From the earth we prosper"
- Location of Wabush in Canada Wabush (Canada)
- Coordinates: 52°52′19″N 66°53′27″W
- Country: Canada
- Province: Newfoundland and Labrador
- Census divisions: 10
- Settled: 1955
- Founded: 1962
- Incorporated: April 11, 1967

Government
  - Type: Municipal incorporation
  - Mayor: Gertie Canning

Area
  - Total: 46.25 km^{2} (17.86 sq mi)
- Elevation: 560 m (1,840 ft)

Population (2021)
  - Total: 1,964
  - Density: 42.46/km^{2} (110.0/sq mi)
- Time zone: UTC−04:00
- Highways: Route 500 (Trans-Labrador Highway); Route 503 (Grenfell Drive)
- Website: labradorwest.com/town-hall/wabush/

Wabush is a small town in the western tip of Labrador, bordering Quebec; it is known for transportation and iron ore operations.

== Economy ==
Wabush is the twin community of Labrador City. At its peak population in the late 1970s, the region had a population of just over 22,000. A reduction in iron mining operations in the late 20th century caused a major decline in jobs and population, when Cliffs Natural Resources Canada had to close and cold store the Scully Mine property (Wabush mines). Since 2018, Tacora Resources Inc. took over and has successfully restarted the Scully property, slowly reinvigorating the community and investing back into the property.

As of 2021, Wabush's population was 1,964. Most residents work in the nearby mines of the Iron Ore Company of Canada, now a unit of Rio Tinto Mines and the Scully Mine of Tacora Resources Inc.

Companies in and around Wabush include:

- Tacora Resources (owner of former Wabush Mines site)

While remote, the town contains modern amenities. A shopping centre includes a post office, bank, a restaurant, a bar, and a snowmobile store. There is also a recreational centre which includes a bowling alley, gymnasium, swimming pool, a teen centre, a weight lifting room, an ice arena, a library, a legion building that serves alcoholic beverages, a furniture store, several playgrounds, a school, a church, two corner stores, and a hotel (which also includes a restaurant, a barber shop, and a bar).

== Transportation ==
Air transportation needs for the twin communities are served by Wabush Airport and seasonally by Wabush Water Aerodrome. It used to receive more frequent service by Air Gaspé, which was acquired by Quebecair in 1973. The latter ended as an independent business in 1986, acquired in turn by CP Air in 1986 and Canadian Airlines in 1987. Currently the area is serviced by Exploits Valley Air Services), Provincial Airlines, Pascan Air and Air Inuit, this airport is no longer covered by ARFF (airport rescue and firefighting) services and the community of Labrador City has withdrawn firefighting services over safety concerns with Transport Canada.

== Climate ==
Like most of Labrador, Wabush has a subarctic climate (Köppen Dfc) with more precipitation than is typical for this type of climate due to the persistent Icelandic Low, which give the region some of the rainiest and snowiest weather in all of Canada. Especially in summer, cloudiness is common due to the lakes nearby and the unstable northerly airstreams that prevail, but because the town is relatively far from the open sea, there is more sunshine in Wabush than in St. John's due to the absence of fog from the Labrador Current. Snow usually melts away in May.

Climate data for Wabush Airport (1991–2020 normals, extremes 1960–present)
| Month | Jan | Feb | Mar | Apr | May | Jun | Jul | Aug | Sep | Oct | Nov | Dec | Year |
|---|---|---|---|---|---|---|---|---|---|---|---|---|---|
| Record high humidex | 7.7 | 5.9 | 14.6 | 16.9 | 35.0 | 37.1 | 39.0 | 35.3 | 32.2 | 22.6 | 13.8 | 7.1 | 39.0 |
| Record high °C (°F) | 8.0 (46.4) | 6.2 (43.2) | 14.7 (58.5) | 17.4 (63.3) | 28.8 (83.8) | 33.3 (91.9) | 32.6 (90.7) | 30.6 (87.1) | 29.5 (85.1) | 21.1 (70.0) | 12.2 (54.0) | 7.2 (45.0) | 33.3 (91.9) |
| Mean daily maximum °C (°F) | −16.2 (2.8) | −14.3 (6.3) | −6.8 (19.8) | 1.3 (34.3) | 9.8 (49.6) | 16.7 (62.1) | 19.6 (67.3) | 18.2 (64.8) | 12.4 (54.3) | 4.5 (40.1) | −3.7 (25.3) | −11.1 (12.0) | 2.5 (36.5) |
| Daily mean °C (°F) | −21.7 (−7.1) | −20.6 (−5.1) | −13.7 (7.3) | −4.5 (23.9) | 4.1 (39.4) | 10.7 (51.3) | 14.1 (57.4) | 13.1 (55.6) | 7.8 (46.0) | 1.0 (33.8) | −7.5 (18.5) | −15.9 (3.4) | −2.8 (27.0) |
| Mean daily minimum °C (°F) | −27.1 (−16.8) | −26.9 (−16.4) | −20.5 (−4.9) | −10.2 (13.6) | −1.6 (29.1) | 4.7 (40.5) | 8.2 (46.8) | 7.9 (46.2) | 3.2 (37.8) | −2.4 (27.7) | −11.3 (11.7) | −20.7 (−5.3) | −8.0 (17.6) |
| Record low °C (°F) | −44.1 (−47.4) | −46.8 (−52.2) | −41.6 (−42.9) | −36.4 (−33.5) | −13.4 (7.9) | −6.9 (19.6) | 0.1 (32.2) | −1.2 (29.8) | −8.1 (17.4) | −22.4 (−8.3) | −33.6 (−28.5) | −42.5 (−44.5) | −46.8 (−52.2) |
| Record low wind chill | −62.8 | −58.2 | −52.6 | −43.4 | −32.6 | −11.8 | — | −6.2 | −13.9 | −28.1 | −43.9 | −59.5 | −62.8 |
| Average precipitation mm (inches) | 48.7 (1.92) | 38.1 (1.50) | 52.3 (2.06) | 47.9 (1.89) | 55.0 (2.17) | 88.7 (3.49) | 113.5 (4.47) | 119.9 (4.72) | 90.8 (3.57) | 80.6 (3.17) | 72.2 (2.84) | 52.5 (2.07) | 860.1 (33.86) |
| Average rainfall mm (inches) | 0.8 (0.03) | 1.8 (0.07) | 3.1 (0.12) | 11.8 (0.46) | 42.0 (1.65) | 85.7 (3.37) | 112.1 (4.41) | 119.6 (4.71) | 86.7 (3.41) | 45.1 (1.78) | 14.7 (0.58) | 3.6 (0.14) | 526.8 (20.74) |
| Average snowfall cm (inches) | 70.7 (27.8) | 56.7 (22.3) | 71.4 (28.1) | 47.7 (18.8) | 13.9 (5.5) | 1.2 (0.5) | 0.0 (0.0) | 0.3 (0.1) | 3.4 (1.3) | 38.9 (15.3) | 80.2 (31.6) | 74.8 (29.4) | 458.9 (180.7) |
| Average precipitation days (≥ 0.2 mm) | 18.1 | 14.0 | 14.7 | 14.0 | 15.3 | 17.4 | 19.3 | 20.7 | 20.3 | 21.1 | 20.8 | 18.5 | 214.1 |
| Average rainy days | 0.9 | 0.9 | 1.4 | 3.8 | 12.5 | 16.7 | 19.3 | 20.7 | 19.7 | 11.9 | 4.8 | 1.7 | 114.3 |
| Average snowy days (≥ 0.2 cm) | 19.6 | 15.4 | 16.2 | 12.7 | 9.3 | 0.91 | 0.05 | 0.05 | 2.0 | 13.5 | 20.8 | 20.7 | 128.0 |
| Average relative humidity (%) (at 15:00 LST) | 67.8 | 61.0 | 58.4 | 58.0 | 54.4 | 54.4 | 58.3 | 61.2 | 64.9 | 71.6 | 77.8 | 75.3 | 63.6 |
| Mean monthly sunshine hours | 98.0 | 132.2 | 151.3 | 180.1 | 210.6 | 212.5 | 218.0 | 202.7 | 116.6 | 75.4 | 56.9 | 67.3 | 1,721.4 |
| Percentage possible sunshine | 38.6 | 47.6 | 41.2 | 43.1 | 43.0 | 42.1 | 43.0 | 44.4 | 30.6 | 22.9 | 21.7 | 28.3 | 37.2 |
Source: Environment Canada

== Demographics ==
In the 2021 Census of Population conducted by Statistics Canada, Wabush had a population of 1,964 living in 798 of its 864 total private dwellings, a change of 3% from its 2016 population of 1,906. With a land area of 42.42 km^{2} (16.38 sq mi), it had a population density of 46.3/km^{2} (119.9/sq mi) in 2021.

Historical populations
| Year | Pop. | ±% |
|---|---|---|
| 1971 | 3,387 | — |
| 1976 | 3,769 | +11.3% |
| 1981 | 3,157 | −16.2% |
| 1991 | 2,331 | −26.2% |
| 1996 | 2,018 | −13.4% |
| 2001 | 1,894 | −6.1% |
| 2006 | 1,739 | −8.2% |
| 2011 | 1,861 | +7.0% |
| 2016 | 1,906 | +2.4% |
| 2021 | 1,964 | +3.0% |

| Canada 2006 Census | | Population | % of Total Population |
|---|---|---|---|
| Visible minority group Source: | South Asian | 20 | 1.1% |
| Visible minority group Source: | Chinese | 0 | 0% |
| Visible minority group Source: | Black | 10 | 0.6% |
| Visible minority group Source: | Filipino | 90 | 5.7% |
| Visible minority group Source: | Latin American | 0 | 0% |
| Visible minority group Source: | Arab | 0 | 0% |
| Visible minority group Source: | Southeast Asian | 0 | 0% |
| Visible minority group Source: | West Asian | 0 | 0% |
| Visible minority group Source: | Korean | 0 | 0% |
| Visible minority group Source: | Japanese | 5 | 0% |
| Visible minority group Source: | Other visible minority | 0 | 0% |
| Visible minority group Source: | Mixed visible minority | 0 | 0% |
| Total visible minority population | | 30 | 1.7% |
| Aboriginal group Source: | First Nations | 50 | 2.9% |
| Aboriginal group Source: | Métis | 70 | 4.6% |
| Aboriginal group Source: | Inuit | 0 | 0% |
| Total Aboriginal population | | 145 | 8.3% |
| White | | 1,595 | 91.7% |
| Total population | | 1,861 | 100% |

== Notable residents ==
- Mike Adam, Canadian curler
- Shawn Doyle, actor
- Michael Crummey, poet and writer

== Literary references ==
Wabush appears in the John Wyndham post-catastrophe novel The Chrysalids under the name of Waknuk.
