= List of international airports in Canada =

As defined by Transport Canada, an international airport:

means any airport designated by the Contracting State, in whose territory it is situated, as an airport of entry and departure for international commercial air traffic, where the formalities incident to customs, immigration, public health, animal and plant quarantine and similar procedures are carried out. (ICAO Annex 9) (In Canada, this does not include airports serving only transborder air traffic with the USA)

— Designation of international airports in Canada, Advisory Circular (AC) No. 302-032

== International airports ==
As of 1 November 2025 there are 13 airports designated as international by Transport Canada:

| Airport | Community | Province | ICAO code | IATA code | Processing capacity (Note: This number refers to the processing capacity of the Canada Border Services Agency. Where no number is given it indicates that the airport is able to handle an aircraft of any size. The numbers in parentheses indicate the number of passengers that may be handled if the aircraft is able to unload in stages. An airport with the number 15 indicates that only general aviation aircraft with 15 or fewer passengers may be handled.) | References |
|---|---|---|---|---|---|---|
| Calgary International Airport | Calgary | Alberta | CYYC | YYC | AOE | |
| Edmonton International Airport | Edmonton | Alberta | CYEG | YEG | AOE | |
| Fredericton International Airport | Fredericton | New Brunswick | CYFC | YFC | 55 (140) | |
| Gander International Airport | Gander | Newfoundland and Labrador | CYQX | YQX | AOE | |
| Halifax Stanfield International Airport | Halifax | Nova Scotia | CYHZ | YHZ | AOE | |
| Greater Moncton Roméo LeBlanc International Airport | Moncton | New Brunswick | CYQM | YQM | 300 | |
| Québec City Jean Lesage International Airport | Quebec City | Quebec | CYQB | YQB | AOE | |
| Montréal–Trudeau International Airport | Montreal | Quebec | CYUL | YUL | AOE | |
| Ottawa Macdonald–Cartier International Airport | Ottawa | Ontario | CYOW | YOW | AOE | |
| St. John's International Airport | St. John's | Newfoundland and Labrador | CYYT | YYT | 165 (450) | |
| Toronto Pearson International Airport - Terminal I & Terminal III | Toronto | Ontario | CYYZ | YYZ | AOE | |
| Vancouver International Airport | Vancouver | British Columbia | CYVR | YVR | AOE | |
| Winnipeg James Armstrong Richardson International Airport | Winnipeg | Manitoba | CYWG | YWG | AOE | |

== Airports of entry ==
The following airports are listed in the Canada Flight Supplement, or Water Aerodrome Supplement, published by Nav Canada as an airport of entry—but are not classified as international airports. All these airports, with the exception of military airports, have a Canada Border Services Agency person available but they may not be available 24 hours a day and may only be open part of the week.

| Airport or office | Community | Province | ICAO code | TC LID | IATA code | Processing capacity | References |
|---|---|---|---|---|---|---|---|
| Abbotsford International Airport | Abbotsford | British Columbia | CYXX | | YXX | 15 | |
| Allan J. MacEachen Port Hawkesbury Airport | Port Hawkesbury | Nova Scotia | CYPD | | YPD | 15 | |
| Atlin Airport | Atlin | British Columbia | CYSQ | | | 15 | |
| Atlin Water Aerodrome | Atlin | British Columbia | | CAD6 | | 15 | |
| CFB Bagotville | La Baie | Quebec | CYBG | | YBG | AOE/M | |
| Bathurst Airport | Bathurst | New Brunswick | CZBF | | ZBF | 15 | |
| Beaver Creek Airport | Beaver Creek | Yukon | CYXQ | | YXQ | 15 | |
| Bedwell Harbour Water Aerodrome | Bedwell Harbour | British Columbia | CAB3 | | YAW | 15/SEA | |
| Billy Bishop Toronto City Airport | Toronto | Ontario | CYTZ | | YTZ | 90 | |
| Billy Bishop Toronto City Water Aerodrome | Toronto | Ontario | | CPZ9 | | 15/SEA | |
| Boundary Bay Airport | Boundary Bay | British Columbia | CZBB | | YDT | 15 | |
| Brandon Municipal Airport | Brandon | Manitoba | CYBR | | YBR | 15 | |
| Brantford Airport | Brantford | Ontario | CYFD | | | 15 | |
| Brechin/Ronan Aircraft Aerodrome | Brechin | Ontario | | CDU7 | | 15/SEA | |
| Brockville Blockhouse Island | Brockville | Ontario | | | | 15/SEA | |
| Campbell River Airport | Campbell River | British Columbia | CYBL | | YBL | 15 | |
| Campbell River Water Aerodrome | Campbell River | British Columbia | | CAE3 | YHH | 15/SEA | |
| Charlottetown Airport | Charlottetown | Prince Edward Island | CYYG | | | 60 (368) | |
| Charlottetown Marine Terminal | Charlottetown | Prince Edward Island | CYYG | | | 15/SEA | |
| CFB Cold Lake | Cold Lake | Alberta | CYOD | | YOD | AOE/M | |
| Collingwood Airport | Collingwood | Ontario | | CNY3 | | 15 | |
| CFB Comox | Comox | British Columbia | CYQQ | | YQQ | AOE/M | |
| Comox Valley Airport | Comox | British Columbia | CYQQ | | YQQ | 15 | |
| Cornwall Regional Airport | Cornwall | Ontario | CYCC | | YCC | 15 | |
| Coronach/Scobey Border Station Airport | Coronach | Saskatchewan | | CKK3 (Note: Federal Aviation Administration location identifier: 8U3) | | 15 | |
| Coutts/Ross International Airport | Coutts | Alberta | | CEP4 (Note: Federal Aviation Administration location identifier: 7S8) | | 15 | |
| Cranbrook/Canadian Rockies International Airport | Cranbrook | British Columbia | CYXC | | YXC | 15 | |
| Cyclone Island | Lake of the Woods | Ontario | | | | 15/SEA | |
| Dawson City Airport | Dawson City | Yukon | CYDA | | YDA | 15 | |
| Dawson City Yukon River Landing (Note: Aerodrome is listed as abandoned and the CBSA says service is temporarily suspended) | Dawson City | Yukon | | CEG7 | | 15/SEA | |
| Deer Lake Regional Airport | Deer lake | Newfoundland and Labrador | CYDF | | YDF | 120 (250) | |
| Drummondville Airport | Drummondville | Quebec | | CSC3 | | 15 | |
| Drummondville Water Aerodrome | Drummondville | Quebec | | CSA7 | | 15/SEA | |
| Eckhart Airport | Creston | British Columbia | | 1S1 (Note: Federal Aviation Administration location identifier.) | | 15 | |
| Edmundston Airport | Edmundston | New Brunswick | CYES | | | 15 | |
| Erik Nielsen Whitehorse International Airport | Whitehorse | Yukon | CYXY | | YXY | 50 (225) | |
| Florenceville Airport | Florenceville-Bristol | New Brunswick | | CCR3 | | 15 | |
| Fort Frances Municipal Airport | Fort Frances | Ontario | CYAG | | YAG | 15 | |
| Fort Frances Water Aerodrome | Fort Frances | Ontario | | CJM8 | | 15/SEA | |
| Fosterville | Fosterville | New Brunswick | | | | 15/SEA | |
| Gananoque Airport | Gananoque | Ontario | | CNN8 | | 15 | |
| Gananoque Municipal Marina | Gananoque | Ontario | | | | 15/SEA | |
| Gananoque River P.U.C. Day Dock | Gananoque | Ontario | | | | 15/SEA | |
| Gatineau-Ottawa Executive Airport | Gatineau | Quebec | CYND | | YND | 15 | |
| Goderich Airport | Goderich | Ontario | CYGD | | | 15 | |
| Goderich Airport | Goderich | Ontario | CYGD | | | 15/SEA | |
| Goose (Otter Creek) Water Aerodrome | Happy Valley-Goose Bay | Newfoundland and Labrador | | CCB5 | | 15/SEA | |
| CFB Goose Bay | Happy Valley-Goose Bay | Newfoundland and Labrador | CYYR | | YYR | AOE/M | |
| Goose Bay Airport | Happy Valley-Goose Bay | Newfoundland and Labrador | CYYR | | YYR | 15 | |
| Gore Bay-Manitoulin Airport | Gore Bay | Ontario | CYZE | | YZE | 15 | |
| Gore Bay-Manitoulin Airport | Gore Bay | Ontario | CYZE | | YZE | 15/SEA | |
| Grand Manan Airport | Grand Manan | New Brunswick | | CCN2 | | 15 | |
| CFB Greenwood | Greenwood | Nova Scotia | CYZX | | YZX | AOE/M | |
| Guelph Airpark | Guelph | Ontario | | CNC4 | | 15 | |
| Îles-de-la-Madeleine Airport | Magdalen Islands | Quebec | CYGR | | YGR | 15 | |
| International Peace Garden Airport | International Peace Garden | Manitoba / North Dakota | | S28 | | 15 | |
| Inuvik (Mike Zubko) Airport | Inuvik | Northwest Territories | CYEV | | YEV | 15 | |
| Inuvik/Shell Lake Water Aerodrome | Inuvik | Northwest Territories | | CEE3 | | 15 | |
| Iqaluit Airport | Iqaluit | Nunavut | CYFB | | YFB | 15 | |
| JA Douglas McCurdy Sydney Airport | Sydney | Nova Scotia | CYQY | | YQY | 44 (200) | |
| John C. Munro Hamilton International Airport | Hamilton | Ontario | CYHM | | YHM | 220 (400) | |
| Kamloops Airport | Kamloops | British Columbia | CYKA | | YKA | 30 | |
| Kamloops Water Aerodrome | Kamloops | British Columbia | | CAH7 | | 15/SEA | |
| Kelowna International Airport | Kelowna | British Columbia | CYLW | | YLW | 215 | |
| Kenora Airport | Kenora | Ontario | CYQK | | YQK | 15 | |
| Kenora Water Aerodrome | Kenora | Ontario | | CJM9 | | 15/SEA | |
| Kingston Norman Rogers Airport | Kingston | Ontario | CYGK | | YGK | 30 | |
| Lake Simcoe Regional Airport | Barrie | Ontario | CYLS | | YLK | 24 | |
| London International Airport | London | Ontario | CYXU | | YXU | 180 | |
| Major-General Richard Rohmer Meaford International Airport | Owen Sound | Ontario | CYOS | | YOS | 15 | |
| Manitowaning/Manitoulin East Municipal Airport | Assiginack | Ontario | CYEM | | YEM | 15 | |
| Montréal–Mirabel International Airport | Montreal | Quebec | CYMX | | YMX | 15 | |
| Montreal Metropolitan Airport | Montreal | Quebec | CYHU | | YHU | 15 | |
| Mont-Tremblant International Airport | Mont-Tremblant | Quebec | CYFJ | | YTM | 15 | |
| CFB Moose Jaw | Moose Jaw | Saskatchewan | CYMJ | | YMJ | AOE/M | |
| Muskoka Airport | Muskoka District Municipality | Ontario | CYQA | | YQA | 15 | |
| Nanaimo Airport | Nanaimo | British Columbia | CYCD | | YCD | 200 (300) | |
| North Bay/Jack Garland Airport | North Bay | Ontario | CYYB | | YYB | 15 | |
| Old Crow Airport | Old Crow | Yukon | CYOC | | YOC | 15 | |
| Old Crow Airport | Porcupine River | Yukon | CYOC | | YOC | 15/SEA | |
| Orillia/Lake St John (Orillia Rama Regional) Water Aerodrome | Orillia | Ontario | | CNV6 | | 15/SEA | |
| Orillia Rama Regional Airport | Orillia | Ontario | | CNJ4 | | 15 | |
| Oshawa Executive Airport | Oshawa | Ontario | CYOO | | YOO | 50 | |
| Pelee Island Airport | Pelee | Ontario | CYPT | | | 15 | |
| Pembroke Airport | Pembroke | Ontario | CYTA | | YTA | AOE/M | |
| Penticton Regional Airport | Penticton | British Columbia | CYYF | | YYF | 30 (120) | |
| Peterborough Regional Airport | Peterborough | Ontario | CYPQ | | YPQ | 15 | |
| Pitt Meadows Regional Airport | Pitt Meadows | British Columbia | CYPK | | | 15 | |
| Port Hardy Airport | Port Hardy | British Columbia | CYZT | | | 15 | |
| Prince George Airport | Prince George | British Columbia | CYXS | | YXS | 30 (120) | |
| Prince Rupert Airport | Prince Rupert | British Columbia | CYPR | | YPR | 15 | |
| Prince Rupert/Seal Cove Water Aerodrome | Prince Rupert | British Columbia | CZSW | | ZSW | 15/SEA | |
| Quai Richelieu | Lake Champlain | Quebec | | | | 15/SEA | |
| Rainy River Water Aerodrome | Rainy River | Ontario | | CKQ4 | | 15/SEA | |
| Regina International Airport | Regina | Saskatchewan | CYQR | | YQR | 200 (300 | |
| Roland-Désourdy Airport | Bromont | Quebec | CZBM | | ZBM | 15 | |
| Saguenay-Bagotville Airport | La Baie | Quebec | CYBG | | YBG | 30 | |
| St. Catharines/Niagara District Airport | St. Catharines | Ontario | CYSN | | YCN | 15 | |
| Saint-Georges Aerodrome | Saint-Georges | Quebec | CYSG | | | 15 | |
| Saint John Airport | Saint John | New Brunswick | CYSJ | | YSJ | 120 (140) | |
| Saint-Léonard | Saint-Léonard | New Brunswick | | | | 15/SEA | |
| St. Stephen Airport | St. Stephen | New Brunswick | | CCS3 | | 15 | |
| St. Thomas Municipal Airport | St. Thomas | Ontario | CYQS | | YQS | 15 | |
| Sand Point Lake Water Aerodrome | Sand Point Lake | Ontario | | CJD6 | | 15/SEA | |
| Sarnia Chris Hadfield Airport | Sarnia | Ontario | CYZR | | YZR | 30 | |
| Saskatoon John G. Diefenbaker International Airport | Saskatoon | Saskatchewan | CYXE | | YXE | 200 (300) | |
| Saugeen Municipal Airport | Hanover | Ontario | CYHS | | | 15 | |
| Sault Ste. Marie Airport | Sault Ste. Marie | Ontario | CYAM | | YAM | 30 | |
| Sault Ste. Marie Water Aerodrome | Canadian Bushplane Heritage Centre (Sault Ste. Marie) | Ontario | | CPX8 | | 15/SEA | |
| Sept-Îles Airport | Sept-Îles | Quebec | CYZV | | YZV | 15 | |
| Sept-Îles/Lac Rapides Water Aerodrome | Sept-Îles | Quebec | | CSM8 | | 15/SEA | |
| Shearwater Heliport | Dartmouth | Nova Scotia | CYAW | | | AOE/M | |
| Sherbrooke Airport | Sherbrooke | Quebec | CYSC | | YSC | 30 | |
| Stephenville International Airport | Stephenville | Newfoundland and Labrador | CYJT | | YJT | 30 | |
| Stratford Municipal Airport | Stratford | Ontario | CYSA | | | 15 | |
| Sudbury Airport | Greater Sudbury | Ontario | CYSB | | | 15 | |
| Sydney Harbour (Seaplanes) | Sydney River | Nova Scotia | | | | 15/SEA | |
| Thunder Bay International Airport | Thunder Bay | Ontario | CYQT | | YQT | 40 | |
| Thunder Bay Water Aerodrome | Thunder Bay | Ontario | | CKE6 | | 15/SEA | |
| CFB Trenton | Trenton | Ontario | CYTR | | YTR | AOE/M | |
| Trois-Rivières Airport | Trois-Rivières | Quebec | CYRQ | | YRQ | 15 | |
| Tuktoyaktuk/James Gruben Airport | Tuktoyaktuk | Northwest Territories | CYUB | | YUB | 15 | |
| Vancouver Harbour Flight Centre | Vancouver | British Columbia | CYHC | | CXH | 15/SEA | |
| Vancouver International Airport Small Aircraft Reporting Station | Vancouver | British Columbia | CYVR | | YVR | 25 | |
| Vancouver International Water Airport | Vancouver | British Columbia | | CAM9 | | 15/SEA | |
| Victoria Airport Water Aerodrome | Victoria | British Columbia | | CAP5 | | 15/SEA | |
| Victoria Inner Harbour Airport | Victoria | British Columbia | CYWH | | YWH | 15/SEA | |
| Victoria International Airport | Victoria | British Columbia | CYYJ | | YYJ | 120 (450) | |
| Region of Waterloo International Airport | Regional Municipality of Waterloo | Ontario | CYKF | | YKF | 180 | |
| Whetstone International Airport | Del Bonita | Alberta | | CEQ4 (Note: Federal Aviation Administration location identifier: H28) | | 15 | |
| Whitehorse Water Aerodrome | Whitehorse (Schwatka Lake) | Yukon | | CEZ5 | | 15/SEA | |
| Wiarton (Keppel) Airport | Wiarton | Ontario | CYVV | | YVV | 15 | |
| Wiarton (Keppel) Seaplane Landing | Wiarton | Ontario | CYVV | | YVV | 15/SEA | |
| Windsor International Airport | Windsor | Ontario | CYQG | | YQG | 325 (450) | |
| Wingham/Richard W. LeVan Aerodrome | Wingham | Ontario | | CPR7 | | 15 | |
| CFB Winnipeg | Winnipeg | Manitoba | CYWG | | YWG | AOE/M | |
| Winterland Airport | Winterland | Newfoundland and Labrador | | CCC2 | | 15 | |
| Yarmouth Airport | Yarmouth | Nova Scotia | CYQI | | | 110 (225) | |
| Yellowknife Airport | Yellowknife | Northwest Territories | CYZF | | YZF | 15 | |

== CANPASS ==
The following airports operate using the CANPASS system. The CANPASS Corporate Aircraft and CANPASS Private Aircraft allows company and private aircraft that frequently fly directly into Canada from the United States to access more airports and receive expedited clearance. Enrolment in each program costs CA$40 for a validity period of five years.

| Airport or office | Community | Province | ICAO code | TC LID | IATA code | Processing capacity | References |
|---|---|---|---|---|---|---|---|
| Airdrie Aerodrome | Airdrie | Alberta | | CEF4 | | CANPASS | |
| Arnprior Airport | Arnprior | Ontario | | CNP3 | | CANPASS | |
| Baie-Comeau Airport | Baie-Comeau | Quebec | CYBC | | | CANPASS | |
| Bar River Airport | Bar River | Ontario | | CPF2 | YEB | CANPASS (SEA) | |
| Bar River Water Aerodrome | Bar River | Ontario | | CNE5 | | CANPASS | |
| Brampton-Caledon Airport | Caledon | Ontario | | CNC3 | | CANPASS | |
| Brockville Regional Tackaberry Airport | Brockville | Ontario | | CNL3 | | CANPASS | |
| Burlington Executive Airport | Burlington | Ontario | CZBA | | | CANPASS | |
| Calgary/Springbank Airport | Calgary | Alberta | CYBW | | | CANPASS | |
| Carp Airport | Carp | Ontario | CYRP | | | CANPASS | |
| Centralia/James T. Field Memorial Aerodrome | Centralia | Ontario | CYCE | | YCE | CANPASS | |
| Charlevoix Airport | Saint-Irénée | Quebec | CYML | | YML | CANPASS | |
| Charlo Airport | Charlo | New Brunswick | CYCL | | | CANPASS | |
| Chatham-Kent Airport | Chatham-Kent | Ontario | CYCK | | XCM | CANPASS | |
| Courtenay Airpark | Courtenay | British Columbia | | CAH3 | YCA | CANPASS | |
| Courtenay Airpark Water Aerodrome | Courtenay | British Columbia | | CBG9 | | CANPASS (SEA) | |
| Creston Aerodrome | Creston | British Columbia | | CAJ3 | CFQ | CANPASS | |
| Debert Airport | Debert | Nova Scotia | | CCQ3 | | CANPASS | |
| Digby Municipal Airport | Digby | Nova Scotia | CYID | | | CANPASS | |
| Duncan Airport | Duncan | British Columbia | | CAM3 | DUQ | CANPASS | |
| Edmonton/Cooking Lake Airport | Edmonton | Alberta | | CEZ3 | | CANPASS | |
| Estevan Regional Aerodrome | Estevan | Saskatchewan | CYEN | | YEN | CANPASS | |
| Fort Langley Water Aerodrome | Fort Langley | British Columbia | | CAS4 | | CANPASS (SEA) | |
| Fox Harbour Airport | Fox Harbour | Nova Scotia | | CFH4 | | CANPASS | |
| Grand Falls Airport | Grand Falls | New Brunswick | | CCK3 | | CANPASS | |
| Grand Forks Airport | Grand Forks | British Columbia | CZGF | | ZGF | CANPASS | |
| Grimsby Regional Airport | Grimsby | Ontario | | CNZ8 | | CANPASS | |
| Kincardine Municipal Airport | Kincardine | Ontario | CYKM | | YKD | CANPASS | |
| Lachute Airport | Lachute | Quebec | | CSE4 | | CANPASS | |
| Langley Regional Airport | Langley | British Columbia | CYNJ | | YLY | CANPASS | |
| Leamington Airport | Leamington | Ontario | | CLM2 | | CANPASS | |
| Lethbridge Airport | Lethbridge | Alberta | CYQL | | YQL | CANPASS | |
| Lindsay/Kawartha Lakes Municipal Airport | Lindsay | Ontario | | CNF4 | | CANPASS | |
| Michel-Pouliot Gaspé Airport | Gaspé | Quebec | CYGP | | YGP | CANPASS | |
| Midland/Huronia Airport | Midland | Ontario | CYEE | | | CANPASS | |
| Milk River Airport | Milk River | Alberta | | CEW5 | | CANPASS | |
| Morden Regional Aerodrome | Morden | Manitoba | | CJA3 | | CANPASS | |
| Niagara Central Dorothy Rungeling Airport | Pelham | Ontario | | CNQ3 | | CANPASS | |
| Ottawa/Gatineau Water Aerodrome (Note: Aerodrome is listed as abandoned in the Water Aerodrome Supplement) | Gatineau | Quebec | | CTI3 | | CANPASS (SEA) | |
| Ottawa/Rockcliffe Airport | Ottawa | Ontario | CYRO | | YRO | CANPASS | |
| Parry Sound Area Municipal Airport | Parry Sound | Ontario | | CNK4 | YPD | CANPASS | |
| Parry Sound (Roberts Lake) Water Aerodrome | Parry Sound | Ontario | | CRL8 | | CANPASS (SEA) | |
| Ponoka (Labrie Field) Airport | Ponoka | Alberta | | CEH3 | | CANPASS | |
| Port Elgin Airport | Port Elgin | Ontario | | CNL4 | | CANPASS | |
| Smiths Falls-Montague Airport | Smiths Falls | Ontario | CYSH | | YSH | CANPASS | |
| Summerside Airport | Summerside | Prince Edward Island | CYSU | | YSU | CANPASS | |
| Tillsonburg Airport | Tillsonburg | Ontario | CYTB | | | CANPASS | |
| Trail Airport | Trail | British Columbia | | CAD4 | YZZ | CANPASS | |
| Trenton Aerodrome | Trenton | Nova Scotia | CYTN | | | CANPASS | |
| Victoriaville Airport | Victoriaville | Quebec | | CSR3 | | CANPASS | |
| Villeneuve Airport | Villeneuve | Alberta | CZVL | | | CANPASS | |
| West Kootenay Regional Airport | Castlegar | British Columbia | CYCG | | | CANPASS | |
| Winkler Aerodrome | Winkler | Manitoba | | CKZ7 | | CANPASS | |

== Cargo ==
The following airports are listed as airports of entry for cargo

| Airport | Community | Province | ICAO code | IATA code | Processing capacity | References |
|---|---|---|---|---|---|---|
| Calgary International Airport | Calgary | Alberta | CYYC | YYC | AOE/CARGO | |
| Edmonton International Airport | Edmonton | Alberta | CYEG | YEG | AOE/CARGO | |
| London International Airport | London | Ontario | CYXU | | AOE/CARGO | |
| Montréal–Mirabel International Airport | Montreal | Quebec | CYMX | | AOE/CARGO | |
| Montréal–Trudeau International Airport | Montreal | Quebec | CYUL | YUL | AOE/CARGO | |
| Ottawa Macdonald–Cartier International Airport | Ottawa | Ontario | CYOW | YOW | AOE/CARGO | |
| Toronto Pearson International Airport | Toronto | Ontario | CYYZ | YYZ | AOE/CARGO | |
| Toronto Pearson International Airport (Note: Service temporarily suspended) | Toronto | Ontario | CYYZ | YYZ | AOE/CARGO | |
| Vancouver International Airport | Vancouver | British Columbia | CYVR | YVR | AOE/CARGO | |
| Winnipeg James Armstrong Richardson International Airport | Winnipeg | Manitoba | CYWG | YWG | AOE/CARGO | |

== See also ==
- National Airports System
- List of the busiest airports in Canada
