= List of airports in Yukon =

This is a list of airports in Yukon. It includes all Nav Canada certified and registered water and land airports, aerodromes and heliports in the Canadian territory of Yukon. Airport names in italics are part of the National Airports System.

Yukon

== List of airports and heliports ==
The list is sorted by the name of the community served; click the sort buttons in the table header to switch listing order.

Community	Airport name	PU PR MI	AOE (Note: An airport of entry has four different categories. An AOE which can accept "all classes of scheduled and non-scheduled aircraft (passenger and cargo)." An AOE/# which can handle aircraft in the previous category but up to maximum number. This number can be exceeded if done in stages as shown in parentheses. An AOE/15 that can accept general aviation aircraft with a maximum of 15 passengers. An AOE/CAN which can handle aircraft subject to the CANPASS regulations.)	Operator	Elevation	ICAO	TC LID	IATA	Image	Coordinates
Beaver Creek	Beaver Creek Airport	PU	15	Government of Yukon	2,131 ft (650 m)	CYXQ		YXQ		62°24′37″N 140°52′03″W
Braeburn Lodge	Braeburn Airport (Cinnamon Bun Airstrip)	PU		Government of Yukon	2,400 ft (730 m)		CEK2			61°29′04″N 135°46′35″W
Burwash Landing	Burwash Airport	PU		Government of Yukon	2,645 ft (806 m)	CYDB		YDB		61°22′14″N 139°02′24″W
Carcross	Carcross Airport	PU		Government of Yukon	2,161 ft (659 m)		CFA4			60°10′27″N 134°41′52″W
Carcross	Carcross Water Aerodrome	PU		J.E. Lishman	2,152 ft (656 m)		CEB7			60°11′00″N 134°42′00″W
Carmacks	Carmacks Airport	PU		Government of Yukon	1,770 ft (540 m)		CEX4			62°06′39″N 136°10′42″W
Chapman Lake	Chapman Aerodrome	PU		Government of Yukon	3,110 ft (950 m)		CEZ2			64°54′13″N 138°16′39″W
Dawson City	Dawson City Airport	PU	15	Government of Yukon	1,215 ft (370 m)	CYDA		YDA		64°02′32″N 139°07′48″W
Faro	Faro Airport	PU		Government of Yukon	2,351 ft (717 m)	CZFA		ZFA		62°12′27″N 133°22′33″W
Fort Selkirk	Fort Selkirk Aerodrome	PU		Government of Yukon	1,560 ft (480 m)		CFS3			62°46′06″N 137°23′05″W
Haines Junction	Haines Junction Airport	PU		Government of Yukon	2,150 ft (660 m)	CYHT		YHT		60°47′21″N 137°32′44″W
Hyland	Hyland Airport	PU		Government of Yukon	2,831 ft (863 m)		CFT5			61°31′26″N 128°16′11″W
La Biche River	La Biche River Airport	PR		EFLO Energy Yukon	1,356 ft (413 m)		CFP6			60°07′45″N 124°02′55″W
Eagle Plains	Wiley Aerodrome	PU		Government of Yukon	2,365 ft (721 m)		CAJ2			66°29′28″N 136°34′24″W
Macmillan Pass	Macmillan Pass Airport	PU		Government of Yukon	3,810 ft (1,160 m)		CFC4			63°10′34″N 130°12′13″W
Mayo	Mayo Airport	PU		Government of Yukon	1,653 ft (504 m)	CYMA		YMA		63°36′59″N 135°52′06″W
McQuesten	McQuesten Airport	PU		Government of Yukon	1,500 ft (460 m)		CFP4			63°36′18″N 137°33′49″W
Minto Mine	Minto Aerodrome	PR		Cobalt Construction	2,969 ft (905 m)		CMN4			62°36′17″N 137°13′19″W
Minto	Minto Landing Aerodrome	PU		Government of Yukon	1,539 ft (469 m)		CML7			62°35′38″N 136°52′27″W
Ogilvie River	Ogilvie Aerodrome	PU		Government of Yukon	1,640 ft (500 m)		CFS4			65°40′00″N 138°07′00″W
Old Crow	Old Crow Airport	PU	15; 15 / SEA	Government of Yukon	816 ft (249 m)	CYOC		YOC		67°34′14″N 139°50′21″W
Pelly Crossing	Pelly Crossing Airport	PU		Government of Yukon	1,872 ft (571 m)		CFQ6			62°50′15″N 136°31′40″W
Pine Lake	Pine Lake Aerodrome	PU		Government of Yukon	3,250 ft (990 m)		CFY5			60°06′11″N 130°56′01″W
Ross River	Finlayson Lake Airport	PU		Government of Yukon	3,094 ft (943 m)		CFT3			61°41′29″N 130°46′26″W
Ross River	Ross River Airport	PU		Government of Yukon	2,359 ft (719 m)	CYDM		XRR		61°58′14″N 132°25′20″W
Silver City	Silver City Airport	PU		Government of Yukon	2,570 ft (780 m)		CFQ5			61°01′44″N 138°24′27″W
Teslin	Teslin Airport	PU		Government of Yukon	2,313 ft (705 m)	CYZW		YZW		60°10′22″N 132°44′38″W
Tincup Wilderness Lodge	Tincup Lake Water Aerodrome	PR		Tincup Wilderness Lodge	2,686 ft (819 m)		CEF9			61°45′42″N 139°12′40″W
Twin Creeks	Twin Creeks Airport	PU		Government of Yukon	2,913 ft (888 m)		CFS7			62°37′10″N 131°16′13″W
Watson Lake	Watson Lake Airport	PU		Government of Yukon	2,255 ft (687 m)		CYQH	YQH		60°06′59″N 128°49′21″W
Watson Lake	Watson Lake Water Aerodrome	PR		Northern Rockies Air Charters	2,232 ft (680 m)		CEJ9			60°07′00″N 128°47′00″W
Whitehorse	Erik Nielsen Whitehorse International Airport	PU	50 (225)	Government of Yukon	2,317 ft (706 m)		CYXY	YXY		60°42′34″N 135°04′08″W
Whitehorse	Whitehorse/Cousins Airport	PU		Government of Yukon	2,200 ft (670 m)		CFP8			60°48′42″N 135°10′56″W
Whitehorse (Schwatka Lake)	Whitehorse Water Aerodrome	PU	15 / SEA	City of Whitehorse	2,138 ft (652 m)		CEZ5			60°41′28″N 135°02′13″W

== Defunct airports ==
Community	Airport name	ICAO	TC LID	IATA	Coordinates
Dawson City	Dawson City Water Aerodrome		CEG7		64°04′00″N 139°26′00″W
Faro	Faro/Johnson Lake Water Aerodrome		CFC9		62°12′12″N 133°23′33″W
Haines Junction	Haines Junction/Pine Lake Water Aerodrome		CFE8		60°48′10″N 137°29′27″W
Teslin	Teslin Water Aerodrome		CEE9		60°10′00″N 132°46′00″W
