= List of Canadian airports by location indicator: CF =

This is a list of all Nav Canada certified and registered water and land airports, aerodromes and heliports in the provinces and territories of Canada sorted by location identifier.

They are listed in the format:

- Location indicator – IATA – Airport name (alternate name) – Airport location

== CF – Canada – CAN ==
Also see airport category and list.

TC LID	IATA	Airport name	Community	Province or territory
CFA2		Port Carling/Fig Air Heliport	Port Carling	Ontario
CFA4		Carcross Airport	Carcross	Yukon
CFA5		Grande Airport	Grande	Alberta
CFA7		Taltheilei Narrows Airport	Great Slave Lake	Northwest Territories
CFA8		Three Hills (Hospital) Heliport	Three Hills	Alberta
CFB2		Frank Channel (Forestry) Heliport	Frank Channel	Northwest Territories
CFB3		Hespero Airport	Hespero	Alberta
CFB4		Trout Lake Aerodrome	Trout Lake	Alberta
CFB5		Namur Lake Airport	Namur Lake	Alberta
CFB6		Edmonton/Josephburg Aerodrome	Josephburg	Alberta
CFB8		Foot's Bay Water Aerodrome	Foot's Bay	Ontario
CFB9		Thornbury/Fossil Beach (Blue Mountain) Heliport	Thornbury	Ontario
CFC4		Macmillan Pass Airport	Macmillan Pass	Yukon
CFC6		Rockyford Airport	Rockyford	Alberta
CFC7		Rimbey Airport	Rimbey	Alberta
CFC8		Flamboro Centre Aerodrome	Flamborough	Ontario
CFD4		Foremost Airport	Foremost	Alberta
CFD5		Grimshaw Airport	Grimshaw	Alberta
CFD8		Fort Simpson (Great Slave No. 2) Heliport	Fort Simpson	Northwest Territories
CFE7		Kananaskis Village Helistop Heliport	Kananaskis Village	Alberta
CFF2		Christina Basin Airport	Christina Basin	Alberta
CFF3		Jean Lake Airport	Jean Lake	Alberta
CFF4	DAS	Great Bear Lake Airport	Great Bear Lake	Northwest Territories
CFF7		CFB Wainwright (Wainwright/Camp Wainwright Field Heliport) (Note: Wainwright/Camp Wainwright Field Airport is a 5,036 ft (1,535 m) grass strip located at the base, and Wainwright/Wainwright (Field 21) Airport is a 7,349 ft (2,240 m) asphalt runway approximately 7 NM (13 km; 8.1 mi) west of the base.))	Wainwright	Alberta
CFF8		Flin Flon/Bakers Narrows Water Aerodrome	Bakers Narrows	Manitoba
CFG3		Consort Airport	Consort	Alberta
CFG4		DeBolt Aerodrome	DeBolt	Alberta
CFG5		John D'Or Prairie Aerodrome	John D'Or Prairie	Alberta
CFG8		Fenelon Falls/Sturgeon Lake Water Aerodrome	Sturgeon Lake	Ontario
CFH2	YWL	Williams Lake (Frontline Helicopters) Heliport	Williams Lake	British Columbia
CFH4		Fox Harbour Airport	Fox Harbour	Nova Scotia
CFH7		Edmonton (Royal Alexandra Hospital) Heliport	Edmonton	Alberta
CFH8		Warburg/Zajes Airport	Warburg	Alberta
CFJ2		Fort St. James (Stuart Lake Hospital) Heliport	Fort St. James	British Columbia
CFK2		Bashaw Airport	Bashaw	Alberta
CFK4		Calling Lake Airport	Calling Lake	Alberta
CFK6		Olds (Netook) Airport	Olds	Alberta
CFL3		Black Diamond (Oilfields General Hospital) Heliport	Black Diamond	Alberta
CFL4		Flesherton (Smithorrs Field) Aerodrome	Flesherton	Ontario
CFL9		Johnson Lake Airport	Johnson Lake	Alberta
CFM2		Birch Mountain Aerodrome	Birch Mountain	Alberta
CFM4		Donnelly Airport	Donnelly	Alberta
CFM6		Teepee Airport	Teepee	Alberta
CFM7		Boyle Airport	Boyle	Alberta
CFM8		Fort Macleod (Alcock Farm) Airport	Fort Macleod	Alberta
CFM9		Fort Macleod (Hospital) Heliport	Fort Macleod	Alberta
CFN5		La Crete (Jake Fehr Memorial) Aerodrome	La Crete	Alberta
CFN6		Primrose Aerodrome	Primrose	Alberta
CFN7		Sundre Airport	Sundre	Alberta
CFP2		Dwight (Fox Point) Water Aerodrome	Dwight	Ontario
CFP3		Lloydminster/Fort Pitt Farms Aerodrome	Lloydminster (Note: The main airport serving the city, Lloydminster Airport, is located in Alberta)	Saskatchewan
CFP4		McQuesten Airport	McQuesten	Yukon
CFP6		La Biche River Airport	La Biche River	Yukon
CFP8		Whitehorse/Cousins Airport	Whitehorse	Yukon
CFQ2		Fort Qu'Appelle (All Nations Healing Hospital) Heliport	Fort Qu'Appelle	Saskatchewan
CFQ5		Silver City Airport	Silver City	Yukon
CFQ6		Pelly Crossing Airport	Pelly Crossing	Yukon
CFQ7		Edmonton/Gartner Airport	Edmonton Metropolitan Region	Alberta
CFR2		Bawlf (Blackwells) Airport	Bawlf	Alberta
CFR3		Fall River Water Aerodrome	Fall River	Nova Scotia
CFR5		French River/Alban Aerodrome	Alban	Ontario
CFR6		Vancouver/Coquitlam Fire and Rescue Heliport	Vancouver	British Columbia
CFR7		Red Deer Forestry Airport	Sundre	Alberta
CFS2		Fort Simpson (Great Slave No. 1) Heliport	Fort Simpson	Northwest Territories
CFS3		Fort Selkirk Aerodrome	Fort Selkirk	Yukon
CFS4		Ogilvie Aerodrome	Ogilvie River	Yukon
CFS5		Spirit River Airport	Spirit River	Alberta
CFS6		Loon River Airport	Loon River	Alberta
CFS7		Twin Creeks Airport	Twin Creeks	Yukon
CFS8		Clearwater River Airport	Clearwater River	Alberta
CFT2		Blackie/Wilderman Farm Airport	Blackie	Alberta
CFT3		Finlayson Lake Airport	Ross River	Yukon
CFT5		Hyland Airport	Hyland	Yukon
CFT8		Pelican Airport	Wabasca oil field	Alberta
CFU3		Chipman Airport	Chipman	Alberta
CFU4		Garden River Airport	Garden River	Alberta
CFU9		Olds (Hospital) Heliport	Olds / Didsbury	Alberta
CFV2		Beiseker Airport	Beiseker	Alberta
CFV3		Mobil Bistcho Airport	Mobil Bistcho	Alberta
CFV5		Náįlįcho Water Aerodrome	Nahanni National Park Reserve	Northwest Territories
CFV6		Margaret Lake Airport	Margaret Lake	Alberta
CFV7		Claresholm (General Hospital) Heliport	Claresholm	Alberta
CFV8		Brooks (Community Health Centre) Heliport	Brooks	Alberta
CFV9		Drayton Valley (Hospital & Care Centre) Heliport	Drayton Valley	Alberta
CFW2		Gordon Lake Airport	Gordon Lake	Alberta
CFW4		Muskeg Tower Airport	Muskeg Tower	Alberta
CFW5		Taltson River Airport	Taltson River	Northwest Territories
CFW8		Grand Falls-Windsor Heliport	Grand Falls-Windsor	Newfoundland and Labrador
CFX2		Calgary/Okotoks Air Ranch Airport	Okotoks	Alberta
CFX4		Manning Airport	Manning	Alberta
CFX5		Renard Aerodrome	Renard diamond mine	Quebec
CFX6		Vulcan Airport	Vulcan	Alberta
CFX8		Chestermere (Kirkby Field) Airport	Chestermere	Alberta
CFY4		Indus/Winters Aire Park Airport	Indus	Alberta
CFY5		Pine Lake Aerodrome	Pine Lake	Yukon
CFZ3		Medicine Hat/Schlenker Airport	Medicine Hat	Alberta
CFZ5		Sundre/Goodwins Farm Airport	Sundre	Alberta

== CG – Canada – CAN ==
Also see airport category and list.

TC LID	IATA	Airport name	Community	Province or territory
CGB2		Carstairs/Bishell's Airport	Carstairs	Alberta
CGB3		Picton (Greenbush) Aerodrome	Picton	Ontario
CGB4		Nanaimo/Gabriola Island (Health Clinic) Heliport	Nanaimo	British Columbia
CGB5		Elliot Lake Water Aerodrome	Elliot Lake	Ontario
CGC2		Galore Creek Heliport	Galore Creek mine	British Columbia
CGC3		Grande Cache (Community Health Complex) Heliport	Grande Cache	Alberta
CGC4		Carway/Grizzly Creek Ranch Heliport	Carway	Alberta
CGD2		Alma (Rivière La Grande Décharge) Water Aerodrome	Alma	Quebec
CGE2		Grand Etang Pubnico Water Aerodrome	Lower West Pubnico	Nova Scotia
CGF4		Grand Forks (Boundary Hospital) Heliport	Grand Forks	British Columbia
CGF5		Huggett/Goodwood Field Aerodrome	Huggett	Alberta
CGF6		Gilford Aerodrome	Gilford	Ontario
CGF7		Barrie/Grenfel Field Aerodrome	Barrie	Ontario
CGH2		Gander (James Paton Memorial Regional Health Centre) Heliport	Gander	Newfoundland and Labrador
CGK2		Gahcho Kue Aerodrome	Gahcho Kue Diamond Mine	Northwest Territories
CGL2		Harrow Airport	Harrow	Ontario
CGL3		Bala/Gibson Lake Water Aerodrome	Bala (Gibson Lake)	Ontario
CGL4		Eaglesham South Aerodrome	Eaglesham	Alberta
CGL5		Gun Lake Heliport	Gun Lakes	British Columbia
CGM2		Smokey Lake (George McDougall Health Centre) Heliport	Smoky Lake	Alberta
CGN2		Réservoir Gouin\Pourvoirie Escapade Aerodrome	Réservoir Gouin	Quebec
CGN3		Lethbridge (Gunnlaugson) Aerodrome	Lethbridge	Alberta
CGN4		Ganonoque Heliport	Gananoque	Ontario
CGN5		Réservoir Gouin/Pourvoirie Escapade Water Aerodrome	Réservoir Gouin (Obedjiwan)	Quebec
CGP4		Grande Prairie Regional Hospital Heliport	Grande Prairie	Alberta
CGR2		Gold River (49 North Helicopters) Heliport	Gold River	British Columbia
CGR3		George Lake Aerodrome	George Lake	Nunavut
CGR4		Gold River (The Ridge) Heliport	Gold River	British Columbia
CGR5		Viking Health Centre (George H. Roddick) Heliport	Viking	Alberta
CGR6		Gravenhurst (Downtown) Water Aerodrome	Gravenhurst	Ontario
CGR7		Centreville/Graham Field	Centreville	New Brunswick
CGR8		Grovedale Fire Hall Heliport	Grovedale	Alberta
CGS2		Goose Lake Aerodrome	Goose Lake	Nunavut
CGS3		Ganonoque/Signature Stables Heliport	Gananoque	Ontario
CGV2		Grand Valley/Luther Field Aerodrome	Grand Valley	Ontario
CGV3		Grand Valley North Aerodrome	Grand Valley	Ontario
CGV4		Gravenhurst (Pr Muskoka) Water Aerodrome	Gravenhurst	Ontario
CGV5		Grand Valley (Black Field) Aerodrome	Grand Valley	Ontario
CGV6		Grand Valley (Martin Field) Aerodrome	Grand Valley	Ontario
CGV7		Springvale Aerodrome	Springvale	Ontario
CGW2		Glenwood Aerodrome	Glenwood	Alberta

== CH – Canada – CAN ==
Also see airport category and list.

TC LID	IATA	Airport name	Community	Province or territory
CHA2		Saint-Étienne-des-Grès/Hydravion Adventure Water Aerodrome	Saint-Boniface	Quebec
CHA4		Wiarton/Hay Island Aerodrome	Wiarton	Ontario
CHB2		Churchill (Hudson Bay Helicopters) Heliport	Churchill	Manitoba
CHB3	UZM	Hope Bay Aerodrome	Hope Bay	Nunavut
CHB4		Sept-Îles/Héli-Boréal Heliport	Sept-Îles	Quebec
CHC3		Barrhead (Healthcare Centre) Heliport	Barrhead	Alberta
CHC4		Ponoka (Hospital & Care Centre) Heliport	Ponoka	Alberta
CHC5		Hayes Camp Aerodrome	Sandspit Lake	Nunavut
CHD2		Hardisty (Health Centre) Heliport	Hardisty	Alberta
CHD3		Hanna (Health Centre) Heliport	Hanna	Alberta
CHE3		Sept-Îles/Mustang Helicopters Heliport	Sept-Îles	Quebec
CHF3		Westlock (Hnatko Farms) Aerodrome	Westlock	Alberta
CHF4		Orono/Hawkefield Aerodrome	Orono	Ontario
CHF5		Wroxeter/Harkes Field Aerodrome	Wroxeter	Ontario
CHG2		Harbour Grace Airport	Harbour Grace	Newfoundland and Labrador
CHH2		Burlington/Hamilton Harbour Water Aerodrome	Burlington	Ontario
CHL2		Hillaton/Kings Aerodrome	Hillaton	Nova Scotia
CHL3		Church Lake Water Aerodrome	Church Lake	Nova Scotia
CHL4		Vittoria/Heli-Lynx Heliport	Vittoria	Ontario
CHL5		High Level (Monashee Helicopters) Heliport	High Level	Alberta
CHL6		Huntsville (North) Water Aerodrome	Huntsville	Ontario
CHM2		Spiritwood/H & M Fast Farms Aerodrome	Spiritwood	Saskatchewan
CHM3		Kennisis Lake/Halminen Water Aerodrome	West Guilford (Kennisis Lake)	Ontario
CHM5		Lake Muskoka South Water Aerodrome	Gravenhurst (Lake Muskoka)	Ontario
CHN2		Huntsville/Grassmere S.D.W. Memorial Water Aerodrome	Huntsville	Ontario
CHP2		Belwood (Heurisko Pond) Water Aerodrome	Belwood	Ontario
CHP3		Mont-Tremblant/Heliport P3	Mont-Tremblant	Quebec
CHQE		Halifax (QE II Health Sciences Centre) Heliport	Halifax	Nova Scotia
CHR2		High River (Hospital) Heliport	High River	Alberta
CHS2		Sept-Îles (H, Stever) Heliport	Sept-Îles	Quebec
CHS3		Hillspring (Beck Farm) Aerodrome	Hill Spring	Alberta
CHS4		Scugog/Charlies Landing Water Aerodrome	Scugog	Ontario
CHS5		Montréal/Heliport Senneville	Montreal	Quebec
CHS6		Ste-Anne (Hospital) Heliport	Ste. Anne	Manitoba
CHS7		Halifax (South End) Heliport	Halifax	Nova Scotia
CHS8		Port Carling/Horseshoe Island Heliport	Port Carling	Ontario
CHT3		Mont-Tremblant/Saint-Jovite Héli-Tremblant Heliport	Saint-Jovite	Quebec
CHT4		Nelson (High Terrain Helicopters) Heliport	Nelson	British Columbia
CHW2		Orangeville (Headwaters Healthecare Centre) Heliport	Orangeville	Ontario

== CI – Canada – CAN ==
Also see airport category and list.

TC LID	IATA	Airport name	Community	Province or territory
CIA2		Kelowna/Ikon Adventures Heliport	Kelowna	British Columbia
CIO2		Île aux Oies Heliport	Île aux Oies	Quebec
CIV2		Invermere (District Hospital) Heliport	Invermere	British Columbia
CIW2		Halifax (IWK Health Centre) Heliport	Halifax	Nova Scotia
