= CFP8 =

CFP8 may refer to:

- Whitehorse/Cousins Airport (TC LID: CFP8), an airstrip in Canada
- CFP8, a C form-factor pluggable variant
