= Flight 85 =

Flight 85 or Flight 085 may refer to:

- Korean Air Flight 085, mistakenly thought hijacked on 11 September 2001
- Northwest Airlines Flight 85, experienced a rudder failure on 9 October 2002
