= YDA =

YDA may refer to:

- IATA code for Dawson City Airport in the Yukon.
- Yale Debate Association
- Young Democrats of America.
- Youth Development Administration, a government agency in Taiwan.
- Yale Dramatic Association ("Dramat") of Yale University.
- A non-playable character from Final Fantasy XIV: A Realm Reborn video game.
