= Erik Nielsen Whitehorse International Airport =

Airport in Yukon, Canada

Erik Nielsen Whitehorse International Airport Aéroport international Erik-Nielsen de Whitehorse
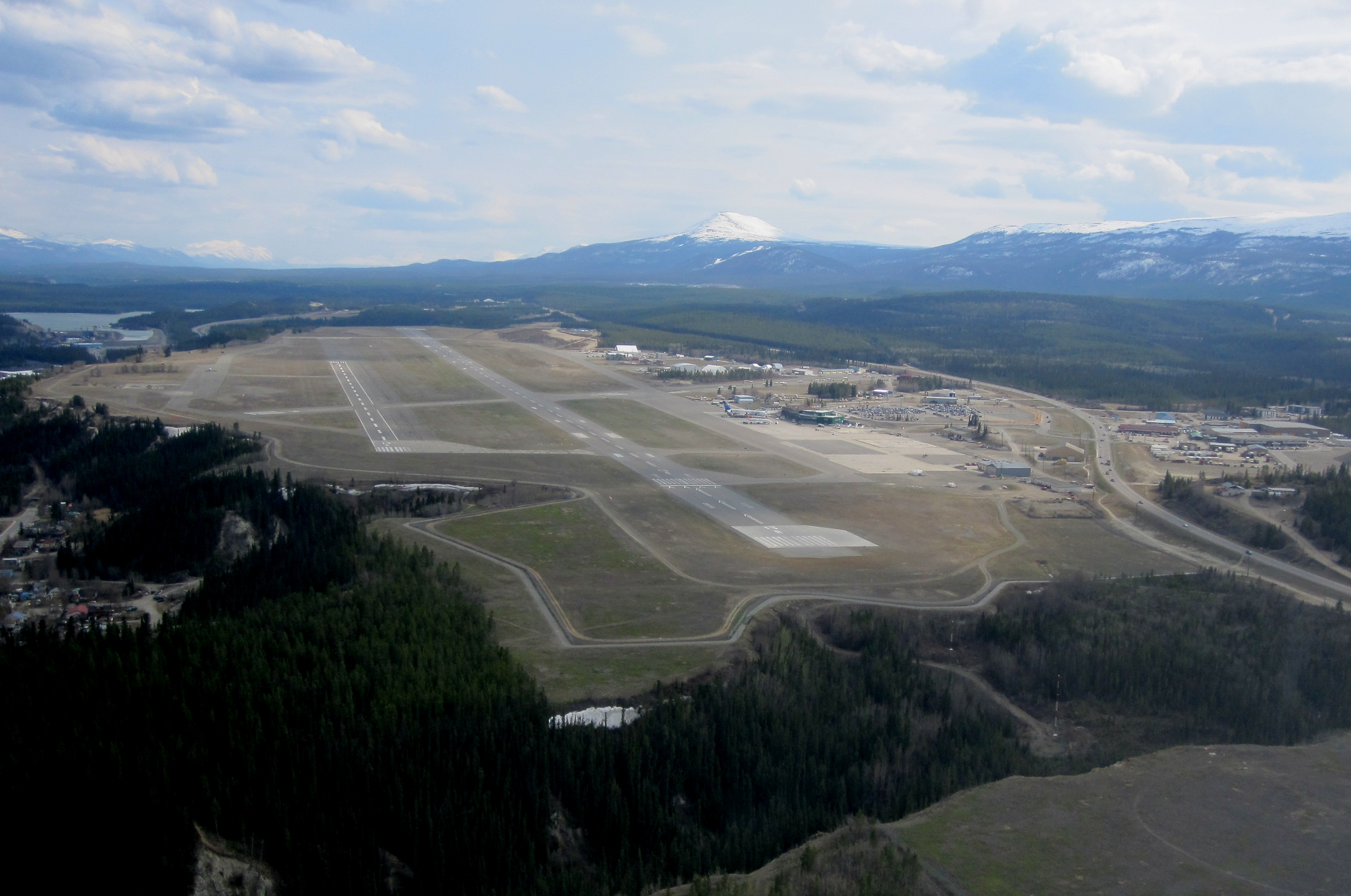
- IATA: YXY; ICAO: CYXY; WMO: 71964

Summary
- Airport type: Public
- Owner/Operator: Government of Yukon
- Location: Whitehorse, Yukon
- Hub for: Air North
- Time zone: MST (UTC−07:00)
- Elevation AMSL: 2,317 ft (706 m)
- Coordinates: 60°42′34″N 135°04′02″W
- Website: yukonairports.ca/about-yxy

Map
- Location in Yukon CYXY (Canada)

Runways
Direction	Length		Surface
Direction	ft	m	Surface
02/20	1,239	378	Asphalt
14R/32L	9,500	2,896	Asphalt
14L/32R	6,597	2,011	Asphalt

Statistics (2025)
- Aircraft movements: 35,121
- Passengers: 244,300
- Sources: Canada Flight Supplement; Environment and Climate Change Canada; Movements from Statistics Canada; Passengers from Government of Yukon

Erik Nielsen Whitehorse International Airport (IATA: YXY, ICAO: CYXY) is an airport of entry located southeast, and adjacent to Yukon's capital and largest city, Whitehorse, Canada. It is part of the National Airports System, and is owned and operated by the Government of Yukon. The airport was renamed in honour of longtime Yukon Member of Parliament Erik Nielsen on December 15, 2008.

In the calendar year 2025 the airport had 35,121 aircraft movements and 244,300 passengers. An decrease of 1,012 aircraft and an increase of 18,529 passengers over the 2024 figures of 36,133 and 22,5771. This represents a 27.8% passenger increase over the 2019 pre-COVID-19 pandemic.

Whitehorse is the hub and main office for Air North.

== History ==
In spring 1920, preparation for the arrival of the Black Wolf Squadron, composed of four de Havilland DH-4s, of the United States Army began on Cyr's wood lot on the hill above Whitehorse. The area was cleared for a landing strip. This landing strip was used by Treadwell Mining and Yukon Airways and Exploration Co. in the mid/late 1920s.

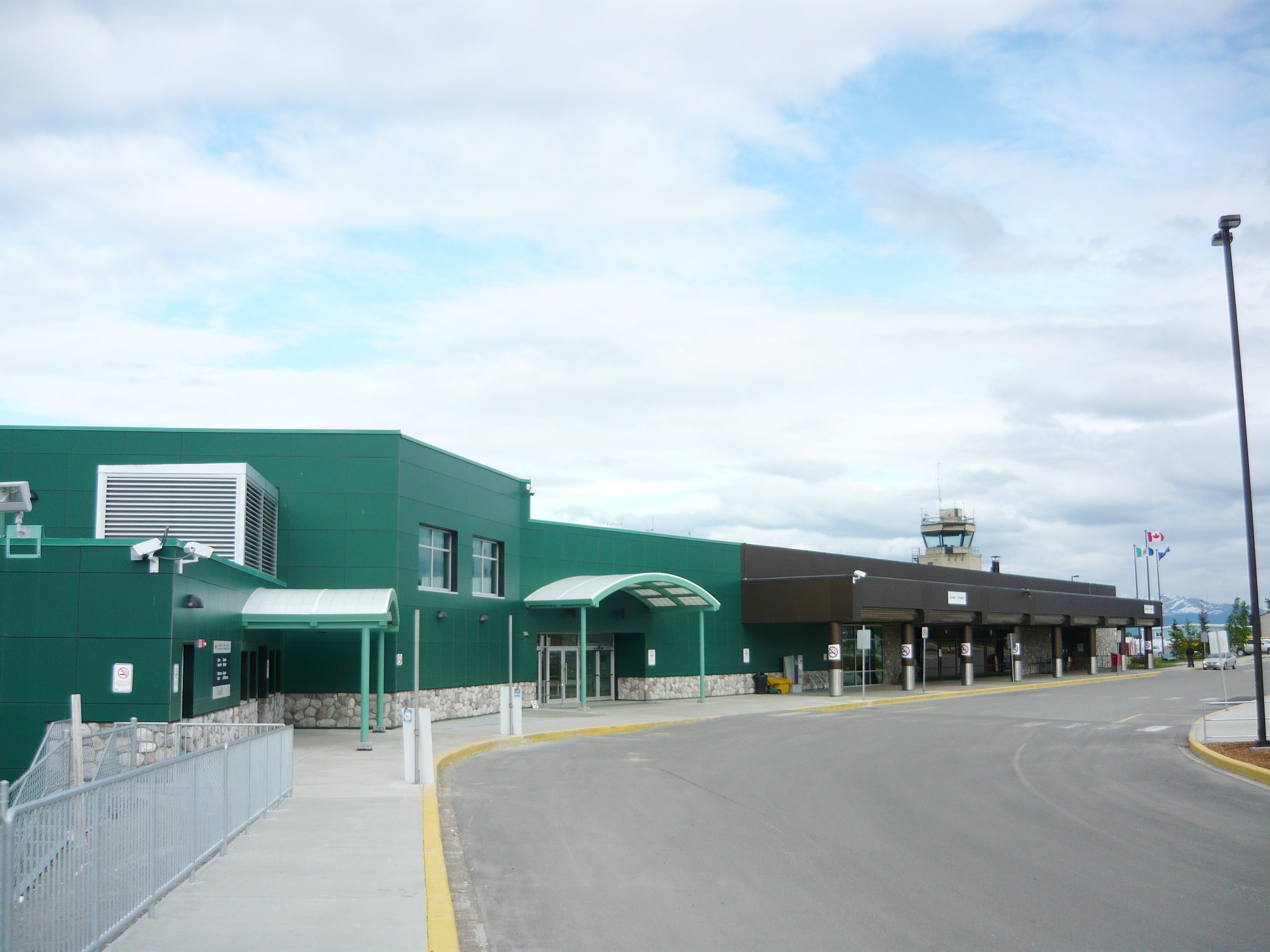
Terminal building

Expanded between 1940 and 1941 by the federal Department of Transport, the facility was transferred to the Royal Canadian Air Force (RCAF) in 1942 as part of the Northwest Staging Route under the name of RCAF Station Whitehorse. The base was closed in 1968, and the airfield resumed its status as a civilian airport.

The airport is classified as an airport of entry by Nav Canada and is staffed by the Canada Border Services Agency (CBSA). CBSA officers at this airport can handle aircraft with no more than 50 passengers; however, they can handle up to 225 if the aircraft is unloaded in stages.

The airport has two fixed-base operators for fuel, limited aircraft maintenance facilities. The control tower operates from 14–04 Zulu (07–21 Mountain Standard Time), and the Whitehorse flight service station provides Airport Advisory Service during the remaining hours. Aircraft rescue and firefighting (ARFF) services are also provided 24 hours a day, 7 days a week.

In addition to scheduled commercial service, numerous small air charter operators and bush pilots use the airport and it serves as a major base for water bombers used in forest fire fighting operations. The airport also controls Whitehorse Water Aerodrome, a seaplane / floatplane base on Schwatka Lake. The floatplane base is also a port of entry and can handle general aviation with up to fifteen passengers.

In May 1998, Air Transat commenced a seasonal charter flight from Frankfurt to bring German tourists to Yukon. This was Whitehorse's first direct link to Europe. The airline operated a Lockheed L-1011 TriStar, a wide-body jet liner on the route. During the September 11 attacks, two aircraft approaching the United States from Asia were diverted to Whitehorse as part of Operation Yellow Ribbon.

One of these flights, a Boeing 747 operating as Korean Air Flight 085, was thought to be hijacked; this was not the case as the jumbo jet was low on fuel. Many of the buildings in the downtown area near the airport were evacuated as a precaution. Those who witnessed the landing by the Korean Air 747 observed the Royal Canadian Mounted Police (RCMP) order the flight crew out at gunpoint.

The airport's parking lot has an old Douglas DC-3 flown by Canadian Pacific Air Lines on a pedestal that serves as a weather vane. The aircraft retired in 1970 and restoration work by the Yukon Flying Club began in 1977. The work was completed in 1981 when it was mounted on a pedestal.

=== Historical airline service ===
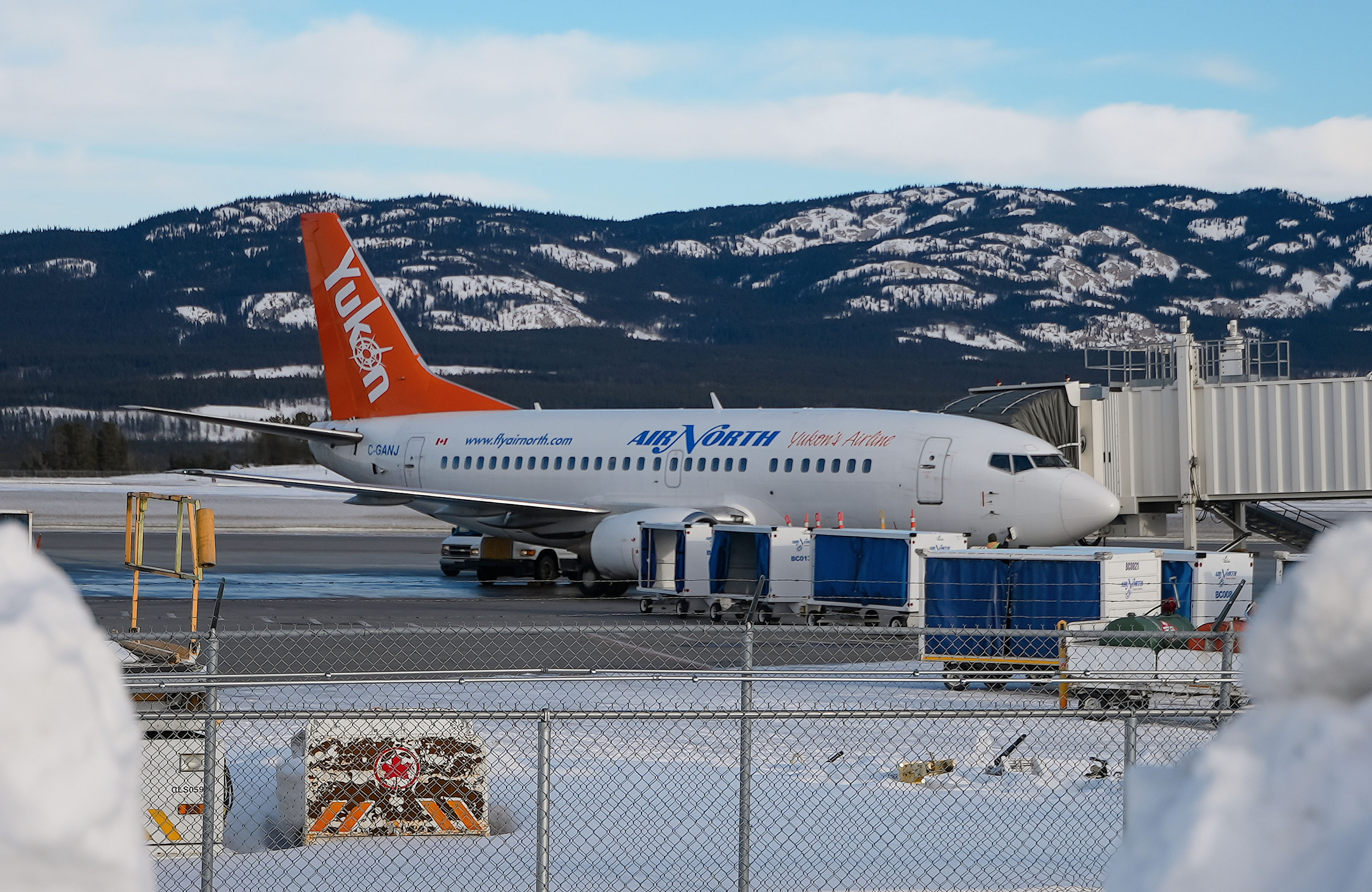
An Air North Boeing 737-500 at Whitehorse

Commencing in the early 1940s, scheduled passenger service was operated by Canadian Pacific Air Lines (Canadian Pacific). Canadian Pacific, later rebranded as CP Air, provided service to Vancouver, Prince George, Fort St. John, and Fort Nelson, all in British Columbia British Columbia; Edmonton, Alberta; and Watson Lake, Yukon. Other destinations in Yukon as well as Fairbanks, Alaska were also served by Canadian Pacific during the mid-1940s with these flights subsequently being discontinued.

CP Air served Whitehorse during the 1970s with the Boeing 737, the 737-200 Series jet airliner with direct, no change of plane flights to all of the above named destinations in Canada. Other Canadian Pacific flights into the airport over the years were earlier operated with such twin engine turboprop aircraft as the Lockheed Model 18 Lodestar, the Douglas DC-3, the Convair 240, and also with larger, four engine Douglas DC-4 and DC-6B prop aircraft as well as Bristol Britannia turboprops.

CP Air was subsequently acquired by Pacific Western Airlines with the combined air carriers then operating as Canadian Airlines International (Canadian Airlines) which in turn continued to serve Whitehorse with Boeing 737 jet service into the 1990s before this air carrier was acquired by Air Canada in 2000. Pacific Western had previously served the airport with nonstop Boeing 737-200 jet airliner service to Edmonton, Prince George (with this flight continuing on to Vancouver) and Yellowknife, Northwest Territories (with this flight continuing on to Winnipeg) operated at various times during the early and mid 1980s.

During the mid and late 1970s, the airport was also served by Winnipeg-based Transair which operated Boeing 737-200 and Fokker F28 twin jet service direct to Winnipeg several days a week via intermediate stops at Yellowknife and Churchill, Manitoba. Transair was also subsequently acquired by Pacific Western Airlines. Another air carrier which served Whitehorse during the early and mid 1970s was International Jetair operating nonstop flights to Inuvik on the weekdays with continuing one stop service several days a week to Fort Nelson flown with Lockheed L-188 Electra turboprop aircraft.

United States-based Pan Am (Pan American World Airways) served Whitehorse during the early 1960s as part of a route linking Seattle with Alaska. Pan Am operated Douglas DC-4 followed by DC-6B model of the Douglas DC-6 prop liners into the airport on a routing of Seattle - Ketchikan - Juneau - Whitehorse - Fairbanks - Galena - Nome. Several Alaska-based airlines also served Whitehorse in the past. During the 1970s, Wien Air Alaska operated Boeing 737-200 jet liners as well as Fairchild F-27 turboprops into the airport with Anchorage-Fairbanks-Whitehorse-Juneau routings. Era Aviation operated Convair CV-580 turboprop aircraft nonstop between Anchorage and Whitehorse during the late 1980s. In 2018 and 2019, Alaska Seaplanes offered direct flights between Juneau and Whitehorse, but that seasonal service did not survive the COVID-19 pandemic-related travel restrictions.

German carrier, Condor Airlines, offered nonstop flights between Whitehorse and Frankfurt during summer for over 20 years. With the Whitehorse airport's main runway repaving work from 2023 to 2026 and Condor retiring its smaller Boeing 767 aircraft in favour of larger Airbus A330 aircraft in 2024, the airline announced the end of its nonstop flight to Whitehorse until at least summer 2026.

== Facilities ==
The airport has its own fire department with three crash tenders and one supervisor vehicle based at a fire station on the airport grounds.

== Airlines and destinations ==
Airlines	Destinations
Air Canada	Vancouver
Air Canada Express	Vancouver
Air North	Calgary, Dawson City, Edmonton, Inuvik, Toronto–Pearson, Vancouver, Victoria, Yellowknife; Seasonal: Ottawa
WestJet	Seasonal: Calgary

== See also ==
- Whitehorse/Cousins Airport
