= Delta Air Lines Flight 1989 =

Hijack false alarm on September 11, 2001

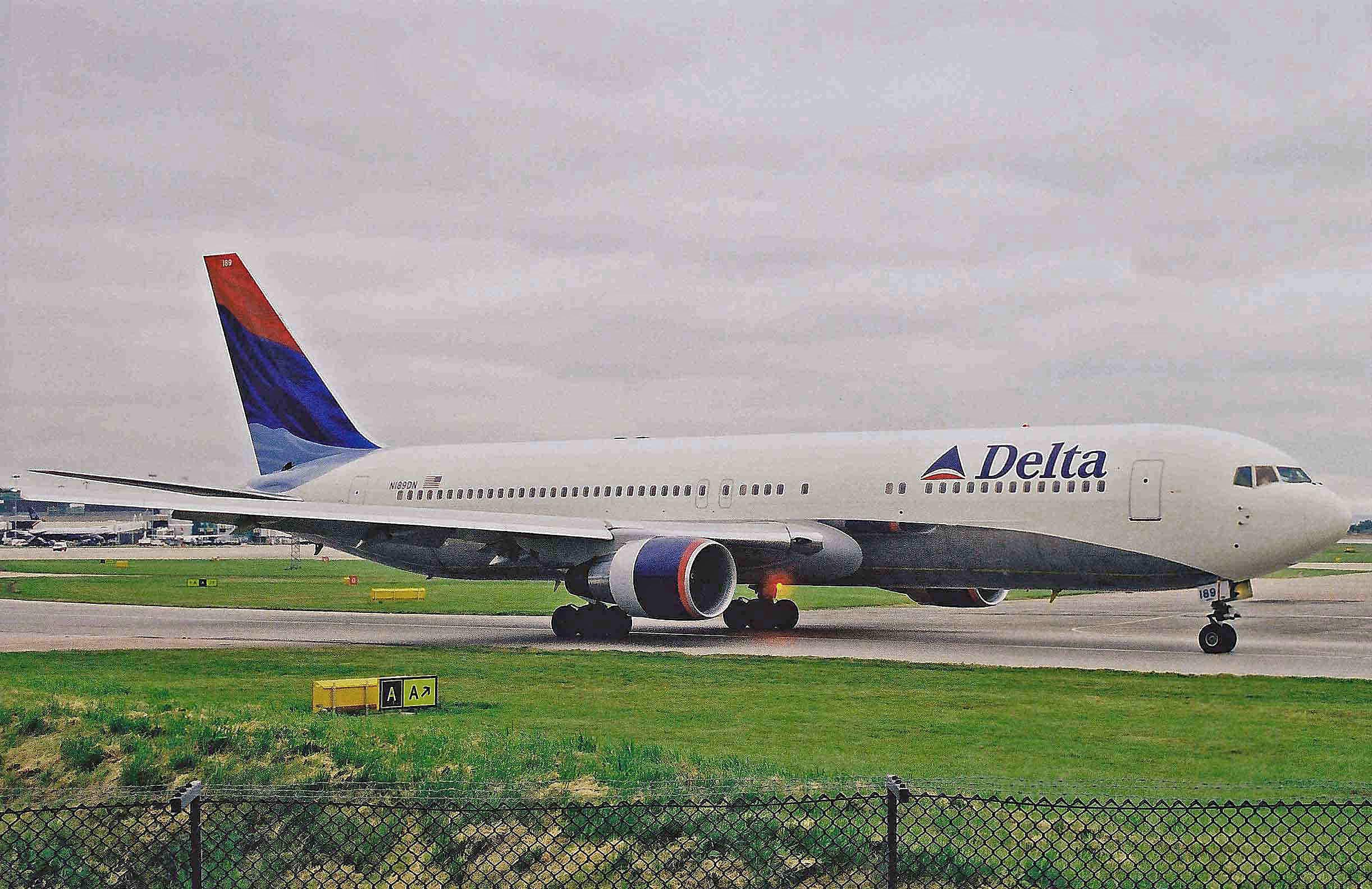
- N189DN, the aircraft, seen at Manchester Airport on July 24, 2000

Hijacking
- Date: September 11, 2001; 25 years ago
- Summary: Suspected hijacking
- Site: Cleveland Hopkins International Airport, Cleveland, Ohio, U.S.

Aircraft
- Aircraft type: Boeing 767-332ER
- Operator: Delta Air Lines
- IATA flight No.: DL1989
- ICAO flight No.: DAL1989
- Call sign: DELTA 1989
- Registration: N189DN
- Flight origin: Logan International Airport, Boston, Massachusetts, United States
- Destination: Los Angeles International Airport, Los Angeles, California, United States
- Occupants: 78
- Passengers: 69
- Crew: 9
- Fatalities: 0
- Injuries: 0
- Survivors: 78

Delta Air Lines Flight 1989 was a regularly scheduled flight on September 11, 2001, from Logan International Airport to Los Angeles International Airport on a Boeing 767 aircraft. This flight was one of several flights initially suspected as possibly hijacked, but landed safely at Cleveland Hopkins International Airport and contained no threat.

== Suspected hijacking ==
Two aircraft that departed Logan International Airport in Boston on September 11, 2001, American Airlines Flight 11 and United Airlines Flight 175, were hijacked by terrorists as part of the September 11 attacks. After the hijacked planes struck the World Trade Center, Boston Center air traffic controllers realized that both aircraft were Boeing 767s departing Logan Airport for transcontinental flights, which was also true of Delta 1989. Boston Center staff notified the Federal Aviation Administration (FAA) about their suspicions at 09:19 EDT (9:19 AM) when the FAA's New England regional office contacted the Herndon Command Center and asked Herndon to relay a request that Cleveland Center notify Delta 1989 to increase cockpit security. Herndon then ordered controllers to send a cockpit warning to Delta 1989. Boston was tracking Delta 1989 and not receiving any radio contact from the aircraft. In fact, Delta 1989 was in Cleveland airspace and in contact with Cleveland Air Traffic Control Center.

The FAA had read Delta 1989 to be in Cleveland airspace and ordered Cleveland Center to watch for Delta 1989 as a suspected hijacking. A Cleveland controller thought he heard "Get out of here" and "We have a bomb on board" coming from Delta 1989. The Delta pilot denied any cockpit intrusion and stated that everyone on board was fine. It was later confirmed that the transmission had come from United Airlines Flight 93, which was in the same vicinity as Delta 1989, and would later crash into a field in Shanksville, Pennsylvania, after the passengers and crew revolted against the hijackers. The NORAD Northeast Air Defense Sector (NEADS) became aware of Delta 1989 right after the crash of American Airlines Flight 77 into The Pentagon at 09:37 when Boston Center called NEADS at 09:41 EDT and told NEADS of the suspicions regarding Delta 1989. At 09:42 EDT, the FAA ordered all aircraft in flight to land at the nearest airport. NEADS dispatched fighter aircraft from Ohio and Michigan to intercept the flight, though Delta 1989 never turned off its transponder and NEADS never lost radar contact with the aircraft. NEADS, the FAA Herndon Command Center, and Cleveland Center tracked Delta 1989 until its eventual landing.

=== Landing ===
After pilots reported an unruly Middle Eastern passenger and due to confusion and lack of communication between Boston and Cleveland, Delta ordered Flight 1989 to land at Cleveland. The flight reversed course over Toledo, Ohio, and landed uneventfully in Cleveland at 09:47, some six minutes after Boston Center called NEADS and told of Delta 1989. The Federal Bureau of Investigation (FBI) and city SWAT team evacuated the airport and held the aircraft at gunpoint on the tarmac for two hours, though all passengers were cleared. After an investigation by local and FBI authorities, it was concluded there was no threat aboard Delta 1989. As noted by the 9/11 Commission report, "During the course of the morning, there were multiple erroneous reports of hijacked aircraft. The report of American 11 heading south—after American 11 had already crashed into WTC 1—was the first; Delta 1989 was the second".

=== Consolidated timeline ===
All times EDT and actions are taken from the official 9/11 Commission Report and public testimony:

- 08:05: Delta Flight 1989 departed Boston Logan International Airport bound for Los Angeles.
- 09:19: FAA New England regional office contacted the Herndon Command Center about their suspicion that Delta 1989—having come from the same airport as the two aircraft that struck the World Trade Center—was a potential hijack target and asked Herndon to relay a request that Cleveland Center notify Delta 1989 to increase cockpit security. Herndon then ordered controllers to send a cockpit warning to Delta 1989.
- 09:32: A Cleveland controller thought he heard "Get out of here" and "We have a bomb on board" coming from Delta 1989. The Delta pilot denied any cockpit intrusion and stated that everyone on board was fine.
- 09:41: NORAD Northeast Air Defense Sector (NEADS) became aware of Delta 1989 right after the crash of American Airlines Flight 77 into the Pentagon when Boston Center called NEADS and told NEADS of their suspicion regarding Delta 1989.
- 09:42: FAA ordered all aircraft in flight to land at the nearest airport.
- 09:45: United States airspace is shut down. No commercial airplanes are allowed to take off, and all commercial aircraft in flight are ordered to land at the nearest airport as soon as possible.
- 09:47: Delta 1989 landed safely in Cleveland, Ohio.

== Aftermath ==
N189DN is still in operation, though it had been stored from March 2020 until early 2021, due to the COVID-19 pandemic. On July 24, 2023, the aircraft suffered severe, but ultimately superficial, damage as a result of a hailstorm after departing from Milan, Italy.

== See also ==
- Korean Air Flight 085 – Hijack false alarm on September 11, 2001
