= Air North =

Airline in Yukon, Canada

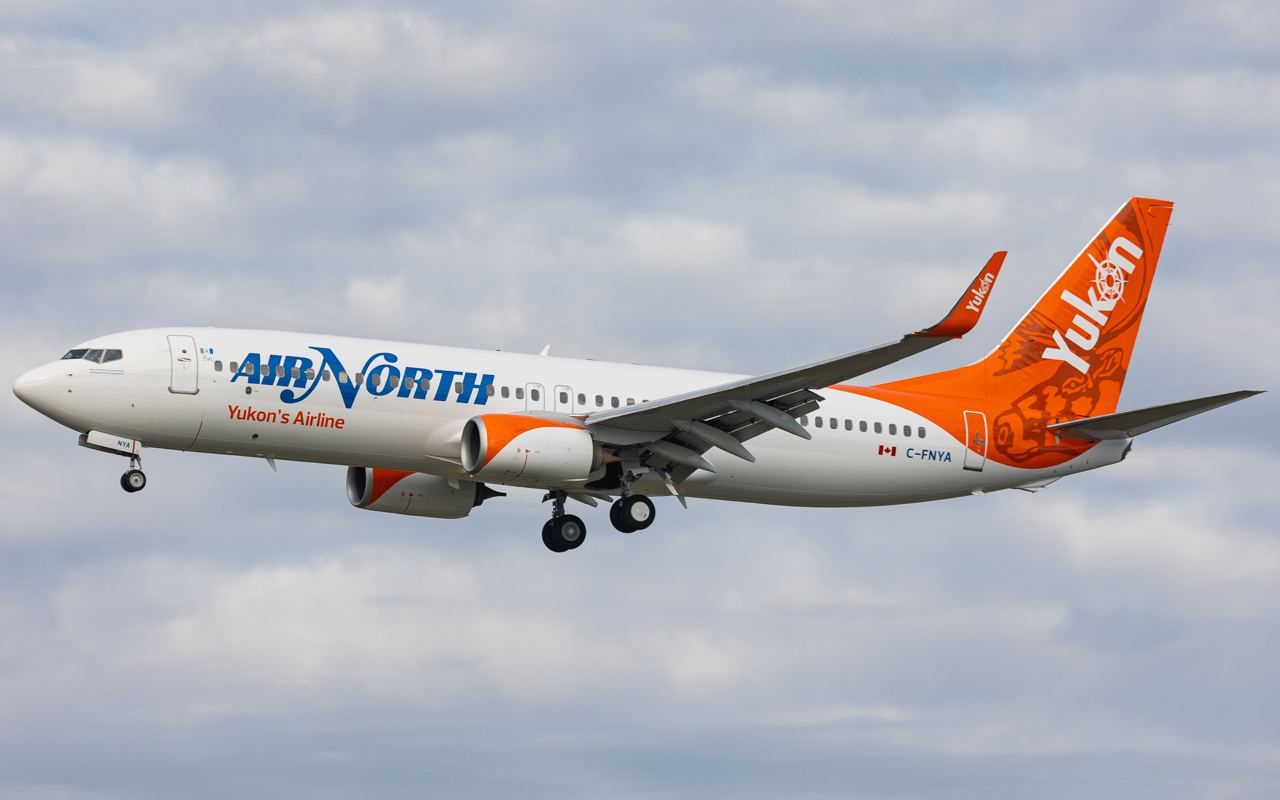
- Air North Boeing 737-800
IATA	ICAO	Call sign
4N	ANT	AIR NORTH
- Founded: 1977
- AOC #: Canada 3121, United States VTDF205F
- Hubs: Whitehorse International
- Focus cities: Calgary International; Dawson City; Vancouver International
- Frequent-flyer program: None
- Fleet size: 11
- Destinations: 13
- Headquarters: Whitehorse, Yukon
- Key people: Joseph Sparling (CEO and President)
- Website: flyairnorth.com

Air North Charter and Training Ltd., operating as Air North, Yukon's Airline, is a Canadian airline based in Whitehorse, Yukon. It operates scheduled passenger and cargo flights throughout Yukon, as well as between Yukon and the Northwest Territories, British Columbia, Alberta, and Ontario. The airline also operates scheduled flights between Yellowknife and Vancouver and Edmonton as well as charter flights throughout Canada and Alaska.

The airline provides ground handling services and fuel services to other airlines throughout Yukon, and it previously provided ground handling services for other carriers at Calgary International Airport, Vancouver International Airport and Edmonton International Airport. Its main base is Erik Nielsen Whitehorse International Airport.

== History ==
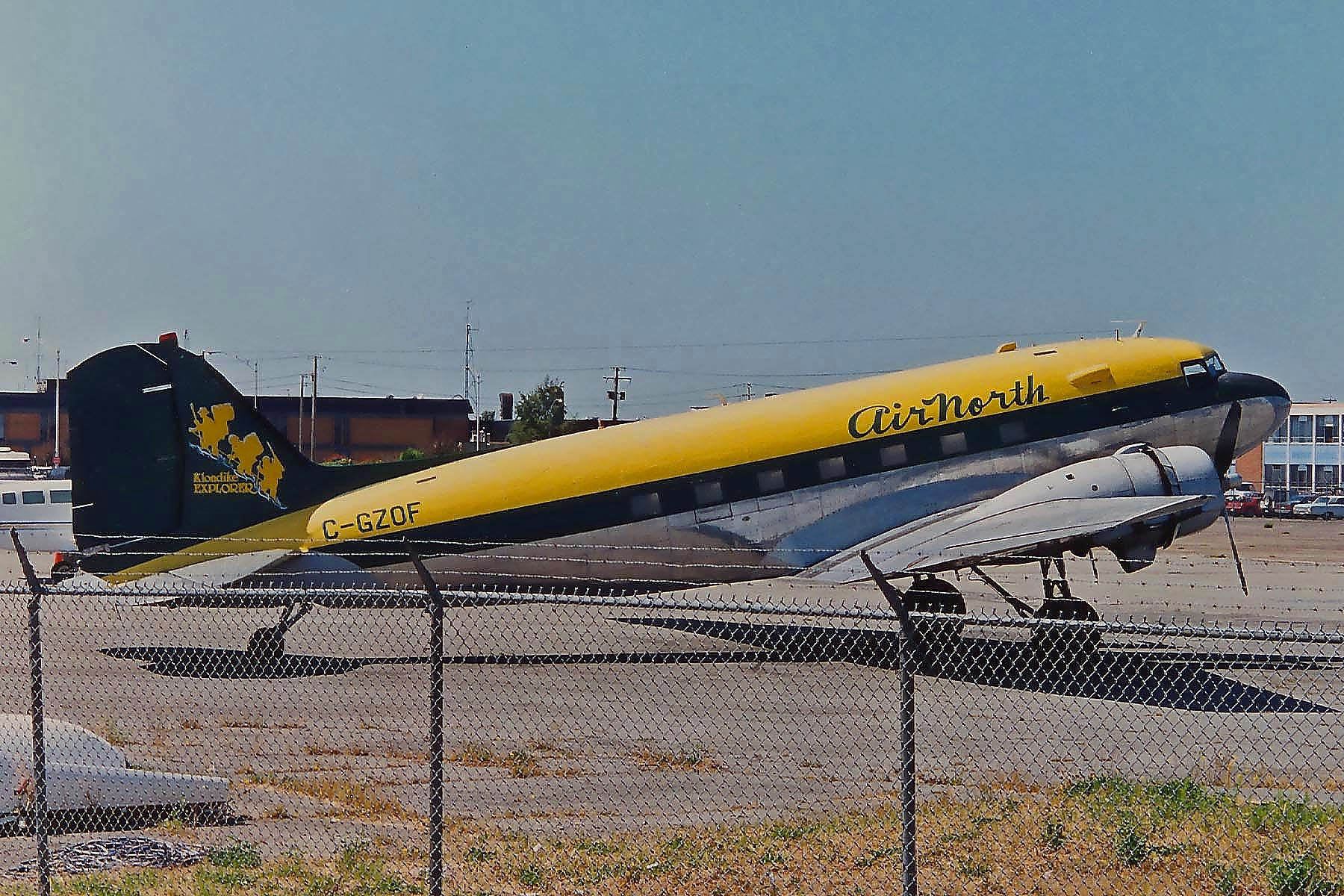
A Douglas DC-3 in Air North livery. The airline acquired several DC-3s throughout the 1980s.

The Vuntut Gwitchin First Nation of Old Crow also began investing in Air North during this time. This investment enabled Air North to acquire two Boeing 737-200 jets in 2002.

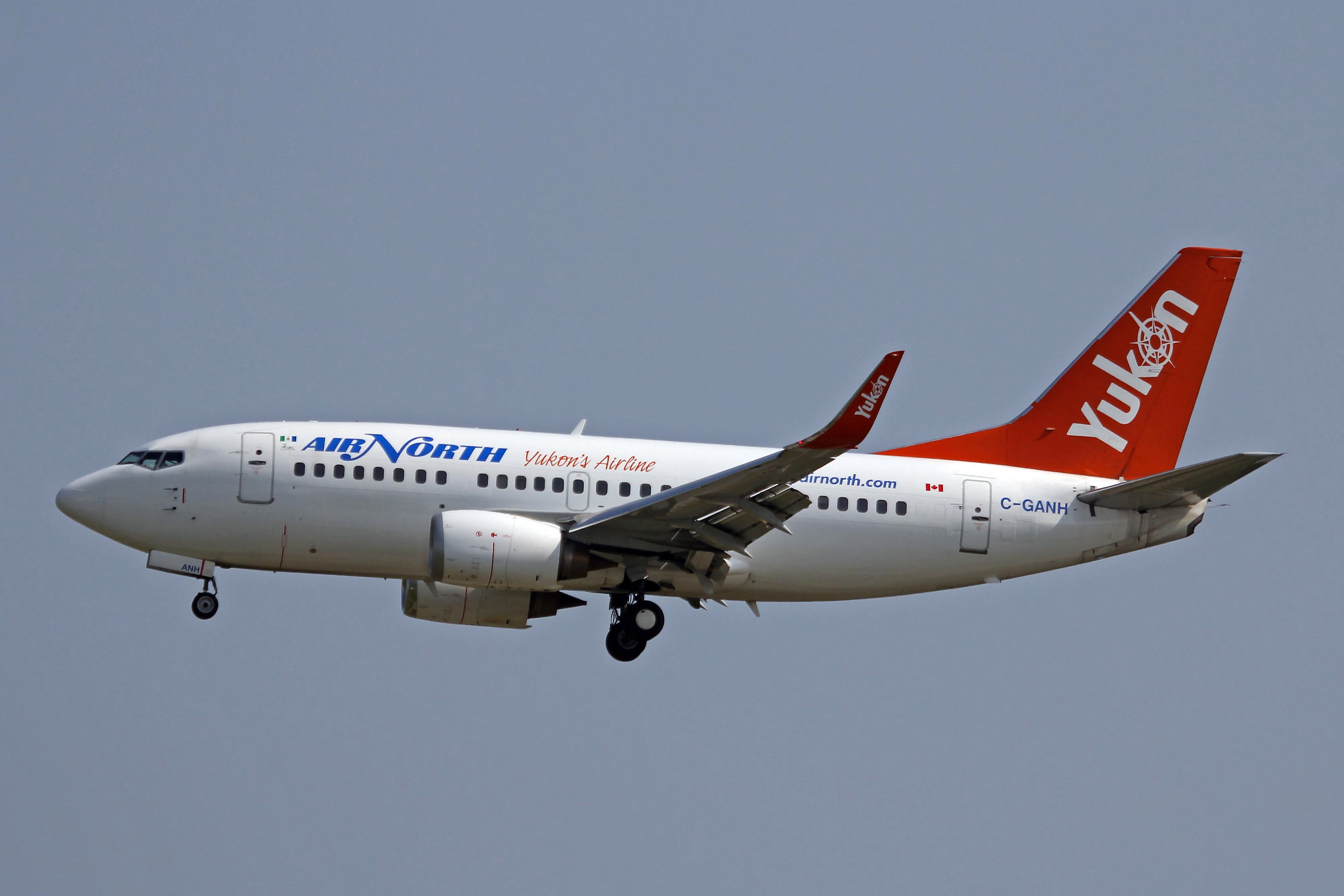
An Air North Boeing 737-500 in July 2012. The airline acquired several 737s in the 2010s.

In 2010, the airline started a new fleet expansion and modernization plan, purchasing a 737-400 and a winglet-equipped 737-500.

In 2017, two ATR 42, both combi aircraft, were introduced to replace existing Hawker Siddeley HS 748 aircraft, ending worldwide scheduled passenger HS-748 service. With newer aircraft in service, the three 737-200 Series and five HS 748s were retired or sold. Some are now parked behind Air North's maintenance base and used for spare parts and staff training.

During the 2021 Canadian federal election, an Air North Boeing 737-500 was chartered by the New Democratic Party (NDP) leader Jagmeet Singh's campaign.

In 2024, the company's fleet was further updated with the introduction of two Boeing 737 Next Generation. Both of the 737-800 are equipped with winglets, improved performance and updated, Boeing Sky-style interiors.

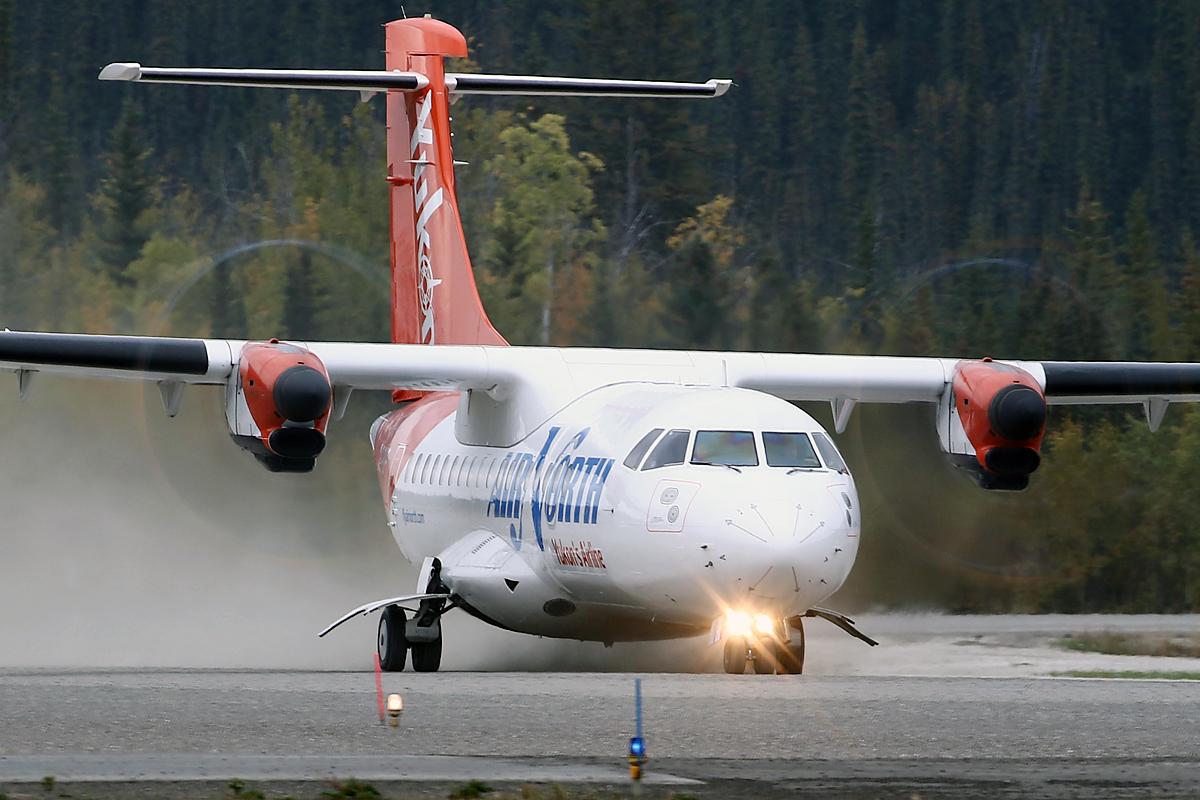
An ATR 42-320 landing at Dawson City Airport

Since the arrival of the Boeing 737s, the main Air North base in Whitehorse has steadily expanded. It now includes the original hangar which is now used as a cargo warehouse and ground equipment shop, a new aircraft maintenance hangar, a reservations and administration building, an operations centre, an in-house catering and cabin services department, and a fuelling facility. Air North also operates secondary bases in Vancouver, British Columbia and Dawson City, Yukon. The in-house catering building opened in the mid-2000s, enabling Air North to offer in-flight meals. Yukon products are featured when possible, and often include Midnight Sun coffee and Yukon Brewing beer. Air North launched its inflight magazine in partnership with North of Ordinary Media in February 2007. Now owned by Nordwind Inc. in Whitehorse published as The Yukon Magazine, it is released quarterly and is available in-flight, by subscription, and at retailers across Canada.

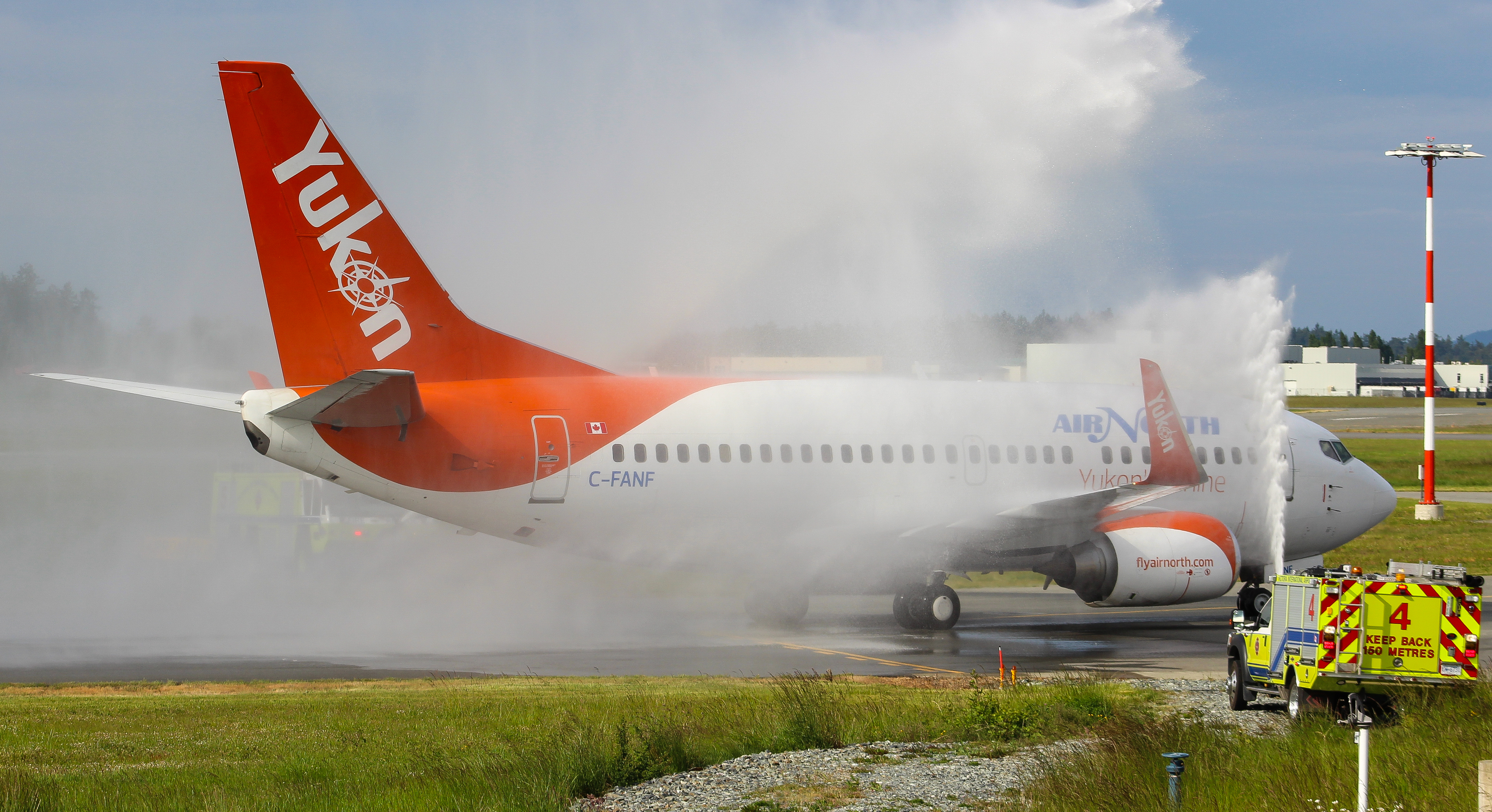
An Air North flight receives a water-cannon salute after completing the airline's first scheduled flight to Victoria from Whitehorse, May 2018.

The remainder of Air North's revenue comes from the operation of a bistro at Whitehorse Airport, ground handling services, providing ground handling for WestJet, at Whitehorse and Old Crow, as well as jet fuel (Jet-A), refuelling services at Whitehorse Airport. Air North is currently both the main fixed-base operator (FBO) and provider of Jet-A fuel service in Whitehorse.

In May 2022, Air North launched its inaugural twice-weekly flight to Toronto via Yellowknife.

Air North is now owned by Joseph Sparling (close to 51%) (President, CEO, and Boeing 737 Captain), the Vuntut Development Corporation (49%), an arm of the Vuntut Gwitchin First Nation, and, as of 2026, more than 2,400 individual Yukoners (less than 0.1% total). Air North is one of the largest private sector employers in Yukon. As of 2015 it has over 500 employees.

In July and August 2026, Air North announced new, year round service between Yellowknife and Edmonton beginning in December 2026. As well, a new seasonal service between British Columbia airports at Vancouver and Kamloops beginning in May 2027 was also announced.

== Destinations ==
Most of Air North's work is scheduled passenger and cargo flights between Whitehorse and Vancouver, Kelowna, Victoria, Calgary, Edmonton, Dawson City, Old Crow, and Inuvik. It also has summer seasonal service to, Ottawa and Toronto. Air North also runs regular freight trips and fuel-haul flights to the fly-in only community of Old Crow, Yukon. In addition to scheduled routes, Air North also offers passenger, combi, cargo, and fuel-haul charter services to anywhere in North America with the ATR 42s and Boeing 737s. Regular charter customers include mine operators, cruise ship tour operators, fishing lodges, and sports teams.

=== Scheduled flights ===
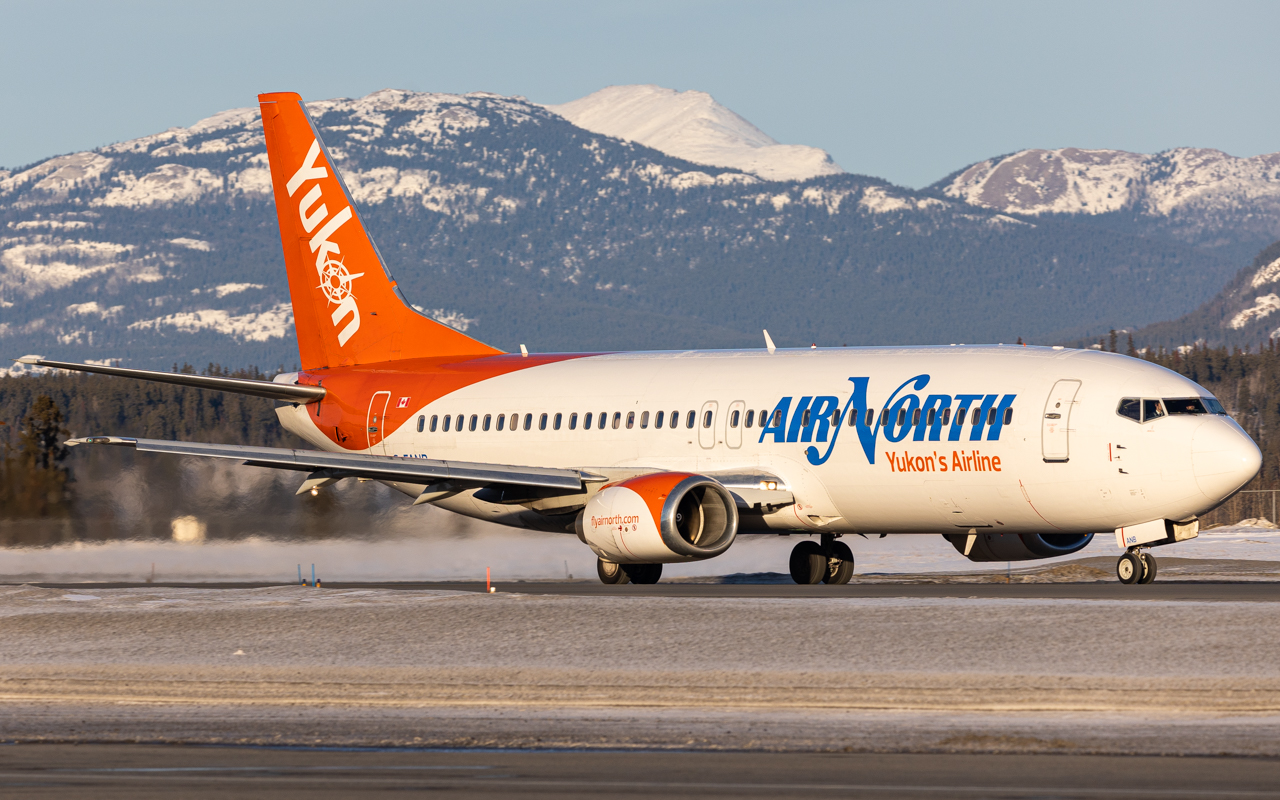
Air North Boeing 737-400 at Erik Nielsen Whitehorse International Airport.

As of 11 October 2026, Air North provides scheduled service to the following 13 destinations.

Country	Province/territory	City	Airport	Notes
Canada	Alberta	Calgary	Calgary International Airport	
Canada	Alberta	Edmonton	Edmonton International Airport	
Canada	British Columbia	Kamloops	Kamloops Airport	
Canada	British Columbia	Kelowna	Kelowna International Airport	
Canada	British Columbia	Vancouver	Vancouver International Airport	
Canada	British Columbia	Victoria	Victoria International Airport	
Canada	Northwest Territories	Inuvik	Inuvik (Mike Zubko) Airport	
Canada	Northwest Territories	Yellowknife	Yellowknife Airport	
Canada	Ontario	Ottawa	Ottawa Macdonald–Cartier International Airport	Seasonal
Canada	Ontario	Toronto	Toronto Pearson International Airport	
Canada	Yukon	Dawson City	Dawson City Airport	
Canada	Yukon	Old Crow	Old Crow Airport	
Canada	Yukon	Whitehorse	Erik Nielsen Whitehorse International Airport	Hub

=== Interline agreements ===
Air North currently has interline agreements with the following airlines:

- China Airlines
- Condor
- Hahn Air
- Philippine Airlines
- WestJet

In addition, Air North has a domestic baggage transfer agreement with Air Canada.

== Fleet ==
=== Current fleet ===
As of 11 October 2026, the Air North fleet have eleven aircraft listed on their website and registered with Transport Canada.

Air North fleet
Aircraft	TC / ANT list	Variants	Passengers	Notes
ATR 42	4	2 - ATR 42-300; 2 - ATR 42-320	42 / cargo	Air North lists all four aircraft as ATR 42-320 with one a dedicated cargo aircraft
Boeing 737 Classic	5	1 - 737-400; 4 - 737-500	156; 122	
Boeing 737 Next Generation	2	737-800	174	
Total	11			

=== Historic fleet ===
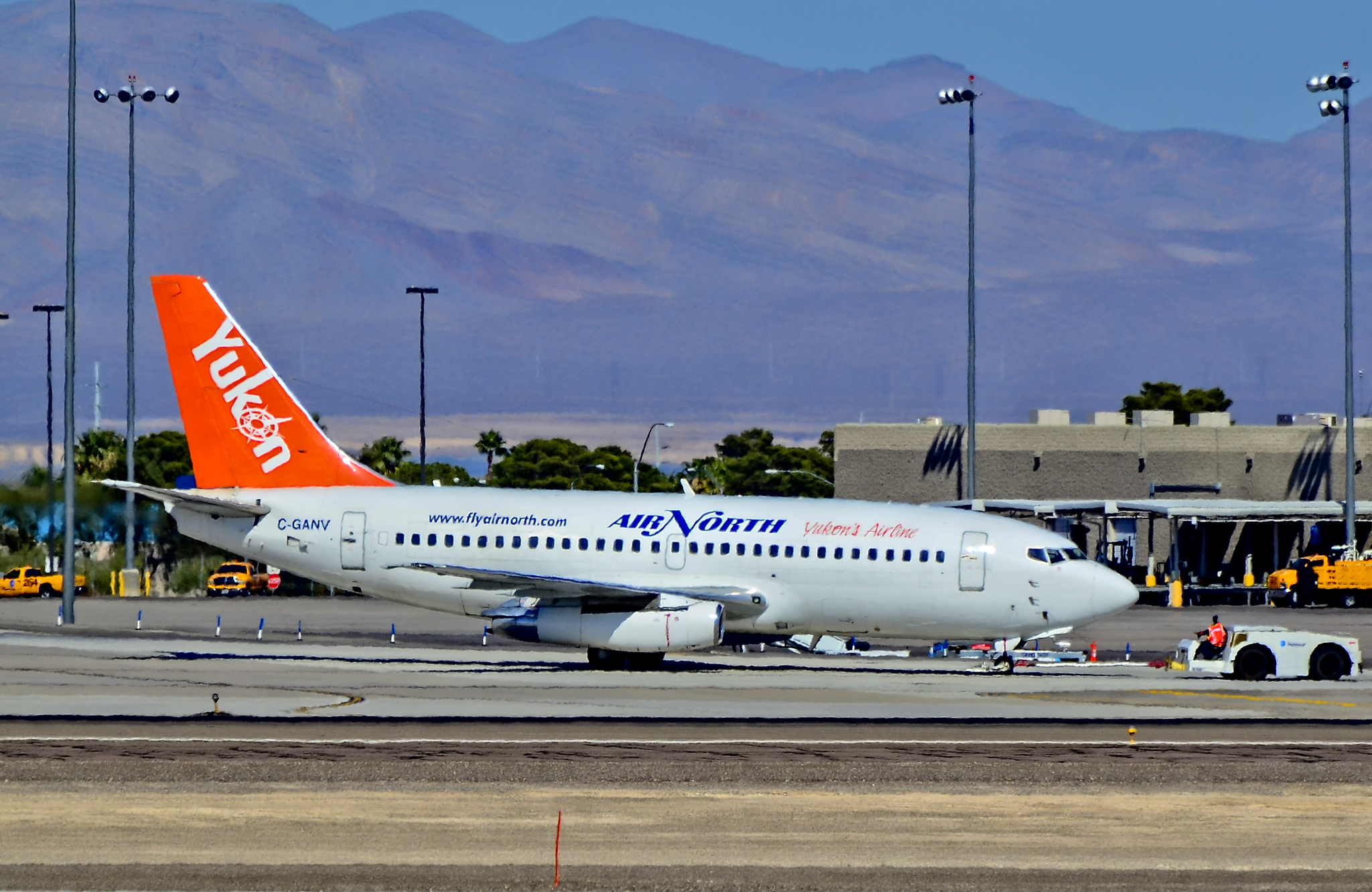
Former Air North Boeing 737-200 at McCarran International Airport on charter operations

Aircraft previously operated include:

- Beechcraft Model 18
- Beechcraft Model 99
- Beechcraft Queen Air
- Boeing 737-200
- Britten-Norman BN-2 Islander
- Cessna 150
- Cessna 172
- Cessna 185 Skywagon
- Cessna 206
- Cessna Skymaster
- de Havilland Canada DHC-2 Beaver
- de Havilland Canada DHC-3 Otter
- de Havilland Canada DHC-4 Caribou
- Douglas DC-3
- Douglas DC-4
- Fairchild F-11 Husky
- Hawker Siddeley HS 748
- Piper PA-31 Navajo

=== Livery ===
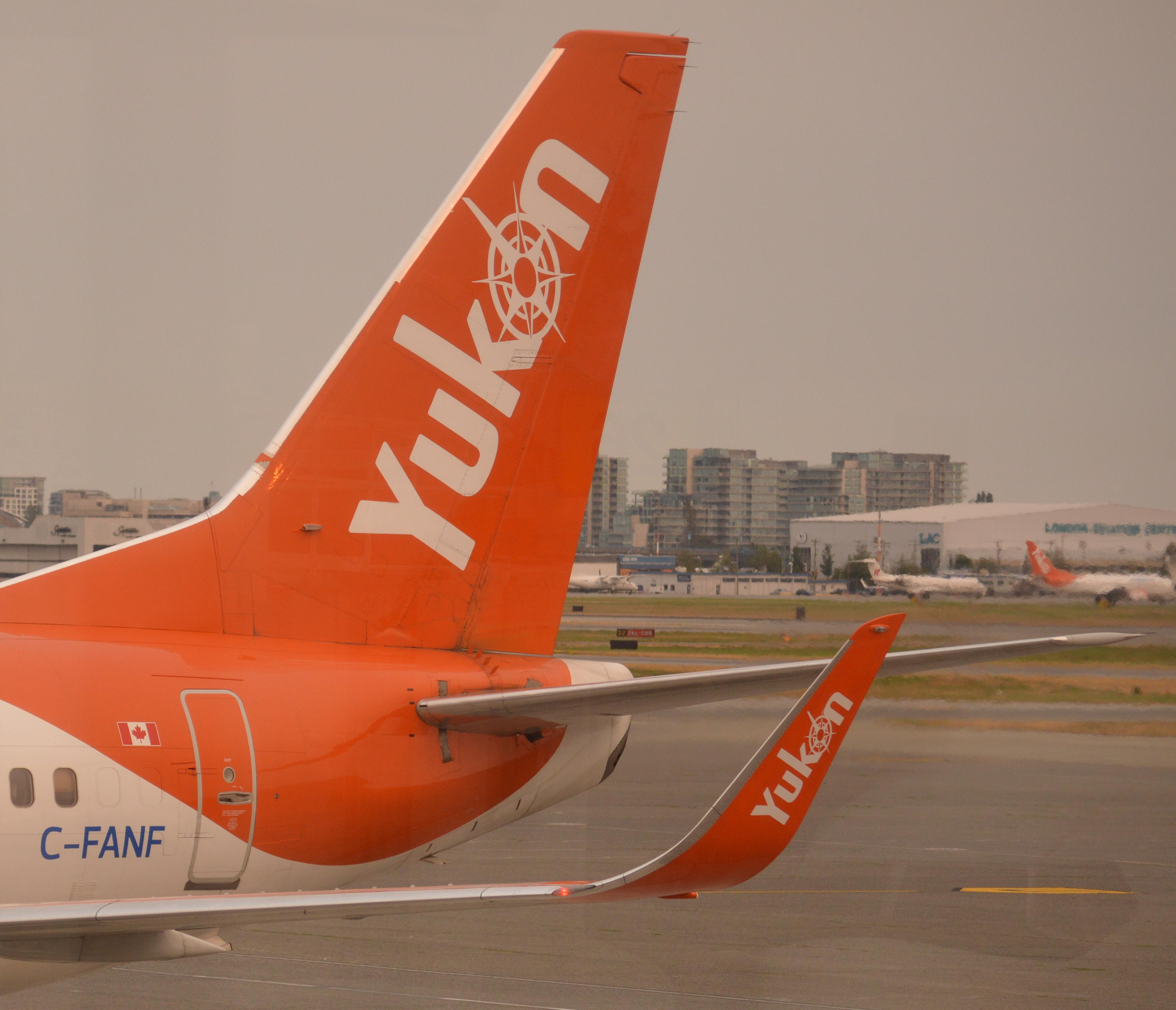
Tails on Air North airplanes are painted orange with a "Yukon" wordmark. The design is also used on the plane's winglets (if present).

Air North's aircraft are painted white except for the lettering on the fuselage, wings, and vertical stabilizer. On the fuselage, the words "Air North" and "Yukon's Airline" are painted, although the positioning varies by aircraft type. On aircraft without winglets, "flyairnorth.com" is painted somewhere on the fuselage.

The tail is painted orange with a stylized "Yukon" printed in white.

On aircraft with winglets, the outside is designed like the tail, with an orange background and the stylized "Yukon" printed on it. On the inside, "flyairnorth.com" is printed.

== Accidents and incidents ==
- On 20 September 1987, Piper PA-31 Navajo C-GPAC crashed on a flight from Whitehorse to Juneau, Alaska, killing all five on board. The plane crashed into a glacier at 4,500 ft (1,400 m).
- On 19 August 1995, Douglas C-47B C-GZOF crashed on approach to Vancouver International Airport, Richmond, British Columbia, killing one of the three crew. The aircraft was on a ferry flight to Prince Rupert Airport when the starboard propeller went into overspeed and the decision was made to return to Vancouver International.
- On 14 August 1996, Douglas DC-4 C-FGNI crashed shortly after takeoff from Bronson Creek mine in northern British Columbia with three crew and a full load of gold ore cargo on board. On climbout, number two engine caught fire and eventually separated from the aircraft. The crew attempted to bring the aircraft back to land, but the aircraft could not maintain altitude on three engines and the crew instead landed in the Iskut River about 1.2 nautical miles (2.2 km; 1.4 mi) west of the Bronson Creek airstrip, where all three crew were able to escape the wreckage. The first officer and loadmaster swam to shore, but the captain was never found and presumed to have drowned.

== Chieftain Energy ==
In 2014, Air North and the Kluane Dana Shäw Limited Partnership (a Kluane First Nation entity) formed Chieftain Energy. Chieftain is a transport, fuel, heating oil, and lubricant distributor. In 2017, Chieftain acquired an Alberta-based fuel distribution company and entered the bulk fuel, transportation, home heating, and cardlock business. That way, Chieftain became an important part of the Air North group.

== Black Wolf Bistro ==
In 2024, Air North opened the Black Wolf Bistro at Whitehorse International Airport (landside). It is the only eatery at that airport. Focusing on departing passengers, it offers breakfast and lunch. In 2026, the bistro added "The Cache", an airside vending machine of fresh snacks.

== The Yukon Magazine ==
The Yukon Magazine (TYM), formerly The Yukon North of Ordinary, is a quarterly arts, travel, and culture magazine in Yukon. The magazine was first published in February 2007. It is also the official inflight magazine for Air North.
