= Korean Air Flight 085 =

Hijack false alarm on September 11, 2001

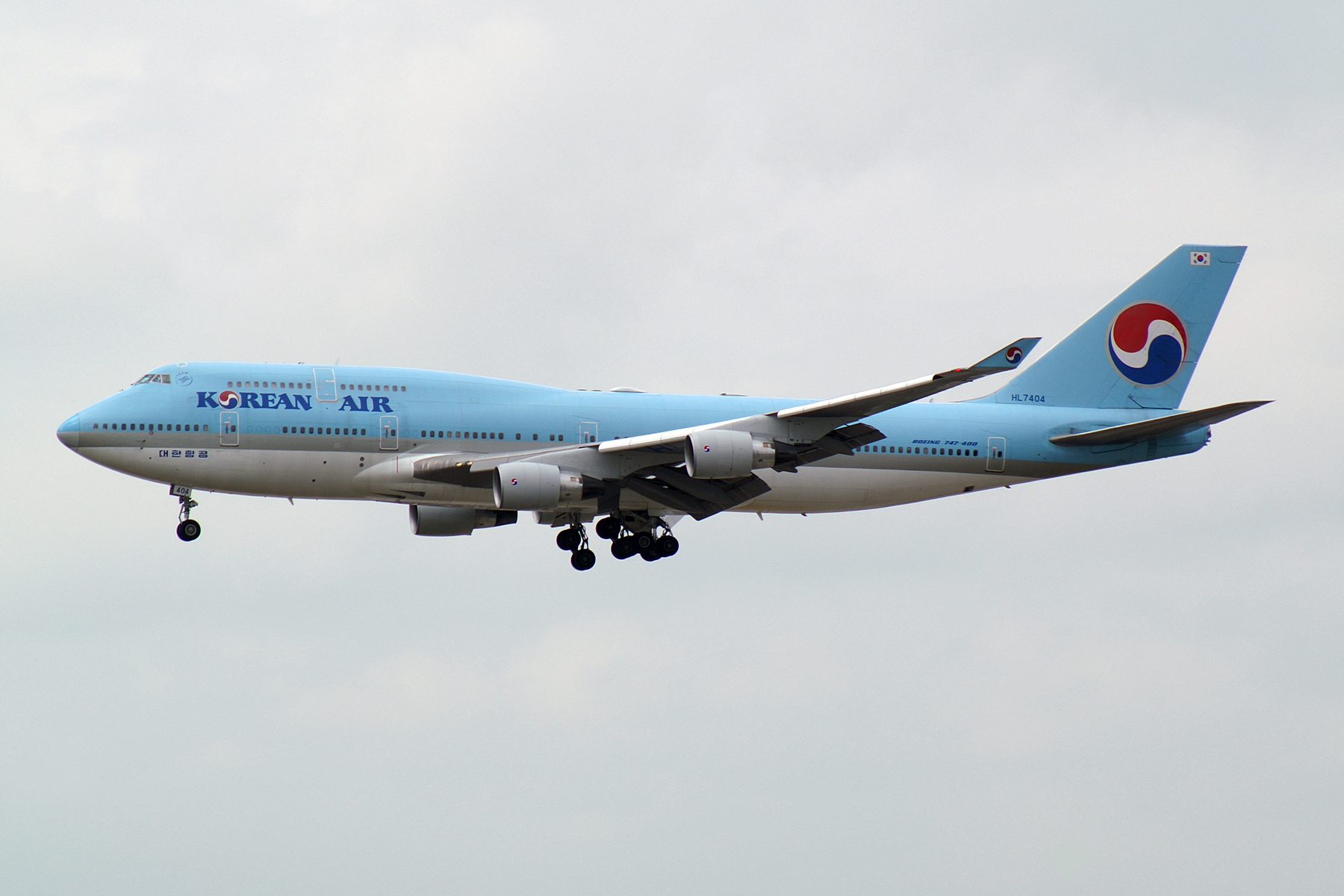
- HL7404, the Boeing 747-400 involved, seen in 2005

Occurrence
- Date: September 11, 2001; 25 years ago
- Summary: Suspected hijacking, false alarm
- Site: Erik Nielsen Whitehorse International Airport, Whitehorse, Yukon, Canada

Aircraft
- Aircraft type: Boeing 747-4B5
- Operator: Korean Air
- Call sign: KOREAN AIR 085
- Registration: HL7404
- Flight origin: Incheon International Airport, Incheon, Seoul, South Korea
- Stopover: Ted Stevens Anchorage International Airport, Anchorage, Alaska, United States
- Destination: John F. Kennedy International Airport, New York City, New York, United States
- Passengers: 215

On September 11, 2001, Korean Air Flight 085, a Boeing 747-400 originating from Incheon International Airport in Seoul, South Korea, was en-route to Ted Stevens Anchorage International Airport in Anchorage, Alaska, when information about the September 11 attacks was relayed to the crew. The ACARS reply message from the pilot in command included the letters "HJK", a prompt interpreted as a distress signal indicating that the flight had been hijacked. When ordered to squawk 7500 (a "hijack" code), the pilot complied, despite miscommunication that implied he would disregard the instruction.

Flight 085 was ordered to divert to Whitehorse International Airport in Canada's Yukon territory. U.S. officials and Canadian prime minister Jean Chrétien authorized the aircraft to be shot down if it did not cooperate. The airliner pilots complied and the 747 landed safely in Whitehorse, with U.S. F-15 military jets escorting it. The suspected hijacking turned out to be a false alarm.

== Incident ==
After the September 11 attacks, a call went out for all international planes to return to their airports of origin (or if they did not have enough fuel, to land in Canadian territory). While discussing the day's events with the Korean Air office, the pilot of Flight 085 included the letters "HJK" (the code for "hijacked") in an airline message. When the pilot sent his message, the text messaging service company Aeronautical Radio, Incorporated (ARINC) noticed the "HJK" code. ARINC officials, worried that the South Korean pilots might be sending a coded message for help, notified North American Aerospace Defense Command (NORAD). NORAD scrambled F-15 jets from Elmendorf Air Force Base in Anchorage to intercept the 747, with Alaska air traffic control (ATC) asking the pilots coded questions.

ATC instructed the flight to change its transponder code to 7500, the universal signal for hijack, expecting that, if they had not been hijacked, the pilots would say so. Instead, they simply complied with the instruction, which ATC took as confirmation that the flight had indeed been hijacked. Worried that a possible hijacked plane might strike a target in Alaska, Governor Tony Knowles ordered the evacuation of large hotels and government buildings in Anchorage. At nearby Valdez, Alaska, the U.S. Coast Guard ordered all tankers filling up with oil to head out to sea. Lt. Gen. Norton A. Schwartz, who was in charge of the NORAD planes that scrambled to shadow Flight 085, told reporters in 2001 that he was prepared to order the South Korean airplane to be shot down before it could attack a target in Alaska.

With NORAD telling Anchorage Air Route Traffic Control Center that it would shoot down the airliner if it came near any potential targets, these controllers informed Flight 085 to avoid all population centers and head out of the U.S. to Whitehorse, Yukon, Canada. NORAD promptly called Canadian authorities seeking the go-ahead to shoot the plane down over Canada:

I said, 'Yes, if you think they are terrorists, you call me again but be ready to shoot them down.' So I authorized it in principle, It's kind of scary that ... [there is] this plane with hundreds of people and you have to call a decision like that. ... But you prepare yourself for that. I thought about it – you know that you will have to make decisions at times that will [be] upsetting you for the rest of your life.

— 2001 Prime Minister Jean Chrétien

Ninety minutes after the South Korean pilots changed their transponder signal to the 7500 hijacked code, the plane landed safely in Whitehorse. Canadian officials evacuated all schools and large buildings before the plane landed. On the tarmac, Flight 085 was met by armed Royal Canadian Mounted Police officers, who, after interrogating the pilots, learned the whole ordeal was caused by a translation error. The South Korean pilot stated that he had been ordered by air traffic control to change the transponder signal and air traffic control confirmed having done so. A second Korean Air 747, a cargo plane, was also diverted to Whitehorse that day. The incident coincided with Operation Yellow Ribbon, the operation that Transport Canada created to handle the diversion of civilian airline flights following the attacks.

== Timeline of events ==
=== September 11, 2001 ===
- Flight 085 takes off from Incheon International Airport in Seoul, South Korea
- 8:46:40 a.m. (Eastern Time Zone (ET)) – American Airlines Flight 11 is flown into the World Trade Center's North Tower
- 9:02:59 a.m. (ET) – United Airlines Flight 175 hits the World Trade Center's South Tower
- 9:37:46 a.m. (ET) – American Airlines Flight 77 crashes into The Pentagon
- 9:58:59 a.m. (ET) – The South Tower collapses.
- 10:03:14 a.m. (ET) – United Airlines Flight 93, whose ultimate target was thought to be either the United States Capitol or the White House, crashes near Shanksville, Pennsylvania
- 10:10 a.m. (ET) – The portion of The Pentagon wall hit by American Airlines Flight 77 collapses.
- 10:28:23 a.m. (ET) – The North Tower collapses.
- 11:08 a.m. (ET) The pilot of Flight 085 includes the letters "HJK", a code for hijacked, in an airline message
- 12:00 p.m. (ET) – ARINC officials notify NORAD about the use of the hijack code
- 1:00 p.m. (ET) – Jets are scrambled from Elmendorf Air Force Base to shadow the plane
- 1:24 p.m. (ET) – Upon request from ATC, the Korean pilots change their transponder signal to the four-digit universal code for hijacked — 7500
- 1–2:45 p.m. (ET) – Alerted that a possible hijacked plane might strike a target in Alaska, Governor Tony Knowles orders the evacuation of potential targets
- 2:54 p.m. (ET) – Flight 085 lands safely in Whitehorse and is met by armed Royal Canadian Mounted Police officers who determine that the plane was not hijacked

== See also ==
- Delta Air Lines Flight 1989 – Hijack false alarm on September 11, 2001
