= CANPASS =

Canada Border Services Agency program

The Canadian Passenger Accelerated Service System (CANPASS) is a Canada Border Services Agency program in place to streamline customs and immigration clearance for travellers flying on corporate and private aircraft. The CANPASS Corporate Aircraft program and the CANPASS Private Aircraft program allow company and private aircraft that frequently fly directly into Canada from the United States to access more airports and receive expedited clearance. Enrolment in each program costs CA$40 for a validity period of five years.

== Former commercial passenger and boat programs ==
The CANPASS Air program for commercial airline passengers was introduced in July 2005 at Edmonton International Airport. The program was launched to "streamline the secure movement of trusted travellers into Canada." The program used iris recognition as proof of identity. The program was opened to citizens and permanent residents of Canada and the United States with a processing fee of CA$50 for a one-year membership. The program was first launched in Edmonton, Calgary, Halifax, Montreal, Toronto, Vancouver, Winnipeg, and Ottawa.

The CANPASS Air program for commercial airline passengers as well as the CANPASS Private Boats program for watercraft passengers were discontinued in 2018. Former CANPASS Air and Private Boat members were encouraged to apply to the joint Canadian-American NEXUS program, which offers the same benefits when entering Canada as well as benefiting from expedited processing through Global Entry when entering the United States. Members maintained their privileges until their membership expired.
