= Old Crow Airport =

Airport in Yukon, Canada

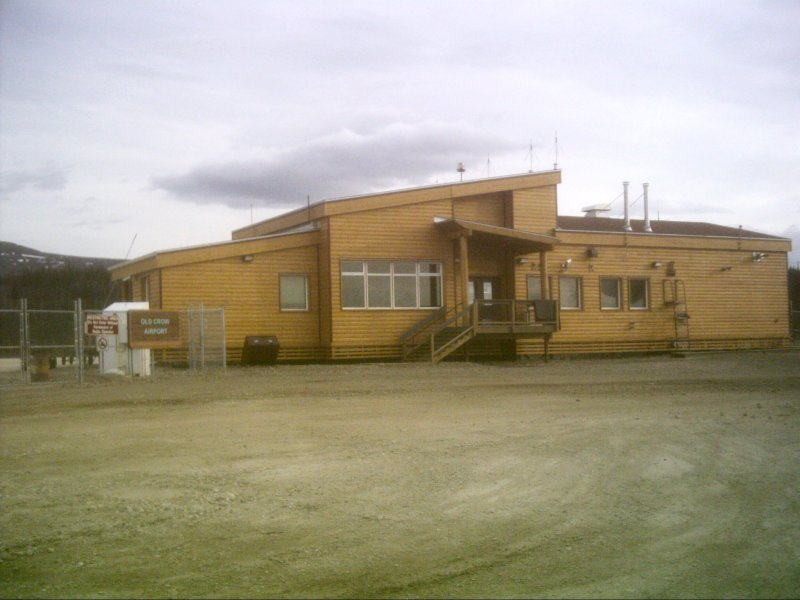
- IATA: YOC; ICAO: CYOC; WMO: 71044

Summary
- Airport type: Public
- Operator: Government of Yukon
- Location: Old Crow, Yukon
- Time zone: MST (UTC−07:00)
- Elevation AMSL: 816 ft / 249 m
- Coordinates: 67°34′12″N 139°50′24″W

Map
- Location in Yukon

Runways
Direction	Length		Surface
Direction	ft	m	Surface
04/22	5,020	1,530	Gravel

Statistics (2010)
- Aircraft movements: 1,281
- Sources: Canada Flight Supplement; Environment Canada; Movements from Statistics Canada.

Old Crow Airport (IATA: YOC, ICAO: CYOC) is located in Old Crow, Yukon, Canada, and is operated by the Yukon government. The gravel runway is 5,022 ft × 100 ft (1,531 m × 30 m) and is at an elevation of 816 ft (249 m). The airport is extremely important to the community, which is not accessible by road.

The airport is classified as an airport of entry by Nav Canada and the Canada Border Services Agency. This airport currently can handle general aviation aircraft only, with no more than 15 passengers.

== Airlines and destinations ==
Airlines	Destinations
Air North	Dawson City, Inuvik
