= Whitehorse/Cousins Airport =

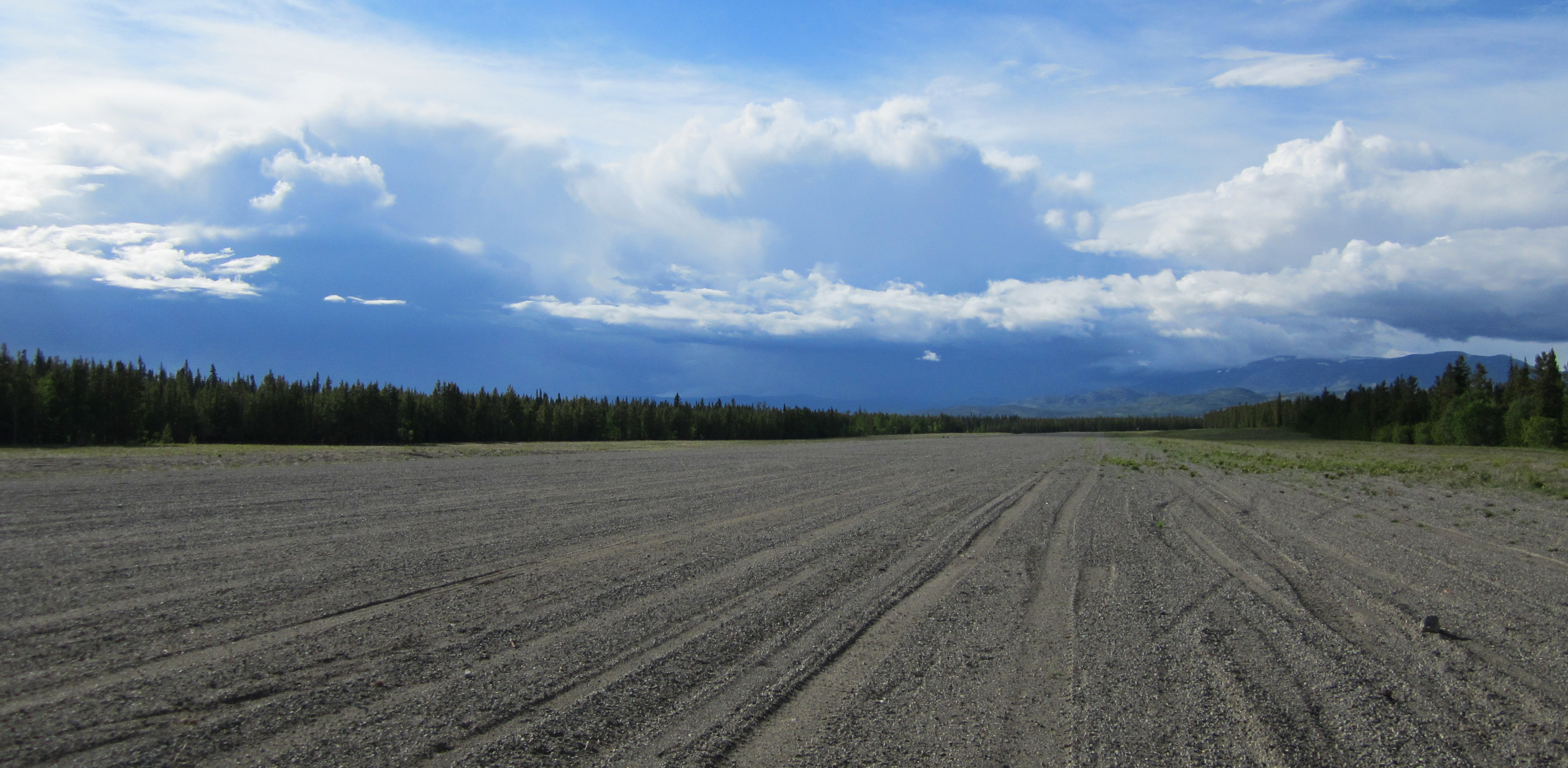
- Runway 30
- IATA: none; ICAO: none; TC LID: CFP8

Summary
- Airport type: Public
- Operator: Government of Yukon
- Location: Whitehorse, Yukon
- Time zone: MST (UTC−07:00)
- Elevation AMSL: 2,200 ft / 671 m
- Coordinates: 60°48′42″N 135°10′56″W

Map
- Location in Yukon

Runways
Direction	Length		Surface
Direction	ft	m	Surface
12/30	2,756	840	Gravel
- Source: Canada Flight Supplement

Whitehorse/Cousins Airport (TC LID: CFP8) is an unpaved airstrip located in Whitehorse, Yukon, Canada, 8 nautical miles (15 km; 9.2 mi) northwest of the city centre between the Alaska Highway and the Yukon River.

This airport has no services at all and is used primarily for local pilot training as well as an emergency landing strip. The airstrip consists of a single 3200' gravel runway and a small gravel apron suitable for light general aviation aircraft. Vehicles can access the apron via Cousins Access Road.

The airport was originally built to support the Alaska Highway construction and the Northwest Staging Route, and is now operated by Yukon Government. It's unmaintained during winter time but often receives basic runway maintenance during summer time.

Cousins airstrip is also home to COPA Yukon's annual fly-in and STOL demonstration held each July. The event is popular among local pilots and is open to the public.

== See also ==
- Whitehorse International Airport
