= Dawson City Airport =

Airport in Yukon, Canada

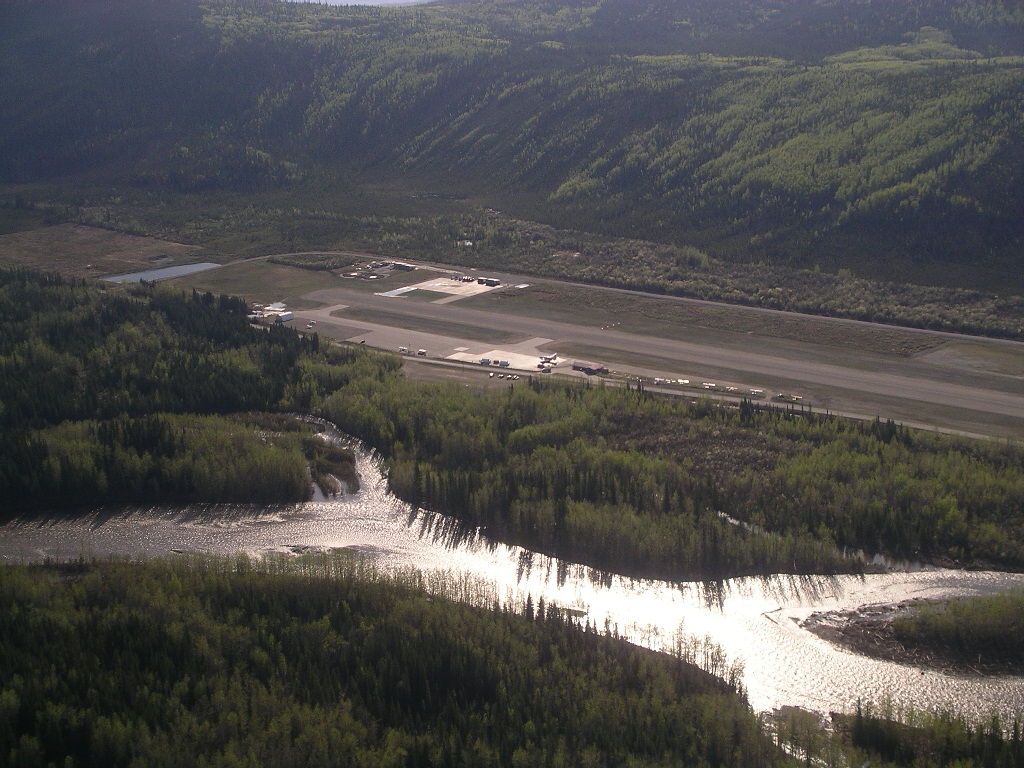
- IATA: YDA; ICAO: CYDA; WMO: 71966

Summary
- Airport type: Public
- Operator: Government of Yukon
- Location: Dawson City, Yukon
- Time zone: MST (UTC−08:00)
- Elevation AMSL: 1,215 ft / 370 m
- Coordinates: 64°02′32″N 139°07′48″W

Map
- Location in Yukon CYDA (Canada)

Runways
Direction	Length		Surface
Direction	ft	m	Surface
03/21	5,003	1,525	Asphalt

Statistics (2010)
- Aircraft movements: 8,670
- Sources: Canada Flight Supplement; Environment Canada; Movements from Statistics Canada.

Dawson City Airport (IATA: YDA, ICAO: CYDA) is located 8 nautical miles (15 km; 9.2 mi) east of Dawson City, Yukon, Canada, in the Klondike River valley, and is operated by the Yukon government. It has a terminal building and a runway which was paved in May 2019. The asphalt runway is 5,003 ft × 100 ft (1,525 m × 30 m) long and at an elevation of 1,215 ft (370 m). A number of studies have recommended moving the airport or realigning the runway as it is in a narrow mountain valley.

The airport is classified as an airport of entry by Nav Canada and is staffed by the Canada Border Services Agency (CBSA). CBSA officers at this airport can normally handle aircraft with up to 15 passengers, but are equipped to handle daily Boeing 737 charters between Dawson City and Fairbanks (Fairbanks International Airport) during the peak summer tourism season.

== Airlines and destinations ==
Airlines	Destinations
Air North	Inuvik, Old Crow, Whitehorse; Seasonal charter: Fairbanks

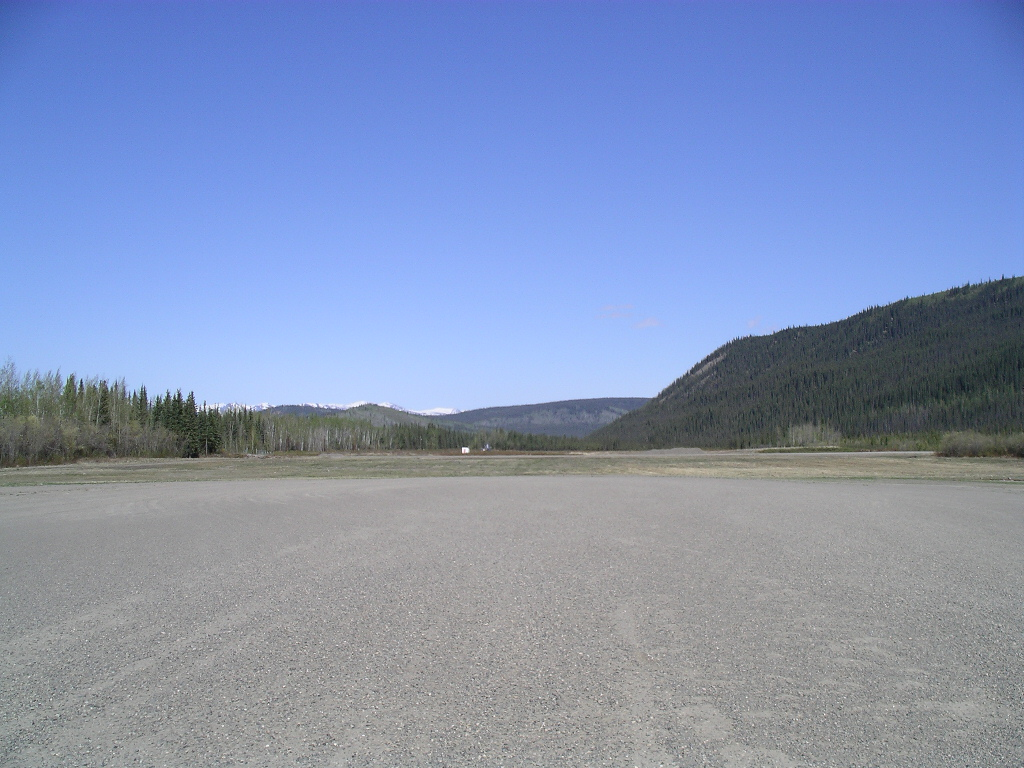
Note the large hills nearby

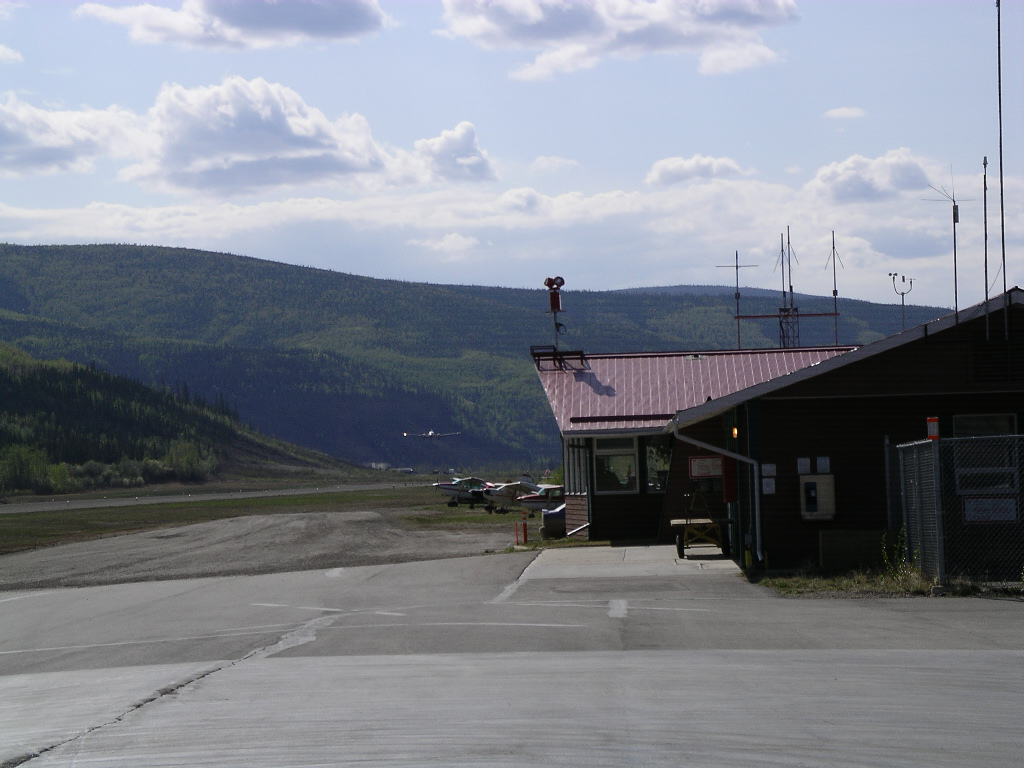
A Hawker Siddeley HS 748 touching down on runway 03

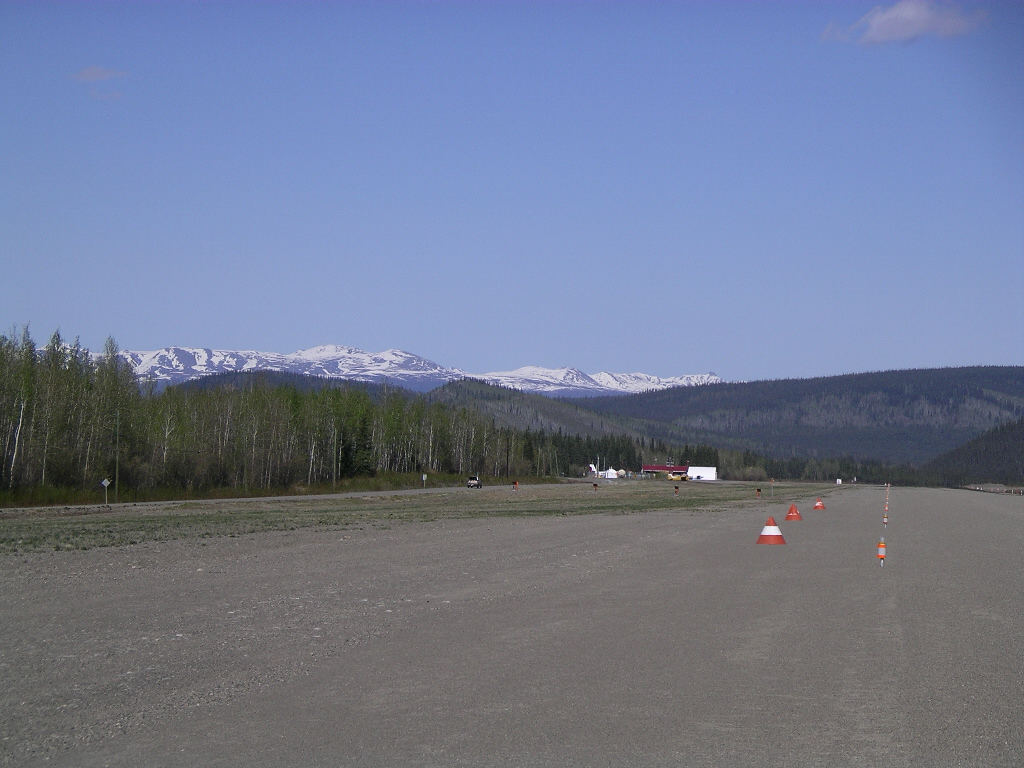
Near the threshold of runway 03

== See also ==
- Dawson City Water Aerodrome
