= Government of Yukon =

Provincial government in Canada

- Territorial Government

Overview
- Established: June 13, 1898
- Country: Canada
- Polity: Federal territory
- Leader: Premier; Currie Dixon
- Appointed by: Commissioner; Adeline Webber
- Main organ: Executive Council
- Responsible to: Yukon Legislative Assembly
- Annual budget: CA$2,140,943
- Headquarters: Whitehorse
- Website: yukon.ca

The Government of Yukon (French: gouvernement du Yukon) is the body responsible for the administration of the Canadian territory of Yukon. In modern Canadian use, the term Government of Yukon refers specifically to the Cabinet (or Executive Council) who are appointed by the Commissioner on the advice of the premier of Yukon. Ministers direct the non-partisan civil service, who staff ministries and agencies to deliver government policies, programs, and services. The executive corporately brands itself as the Government of Yukon.

Yukon operates in the Westminster system of government. The political party or coalition that wins the largest number of seats in the legislature forms government, and the party's leader becomes premier of Yukon and ministers are selected by the premier.

== Role of the Federal Government ==
The powers of the Crown are vested in the federal government and are exercised by the commissioner. The advice of the premier and Executive Council is typically binding.

=== Commissioner ===
The Commissioner is appointed by the prime minister of Canada. Thus, it is typically the commissioner whom the premier and ministers advise, exercising much of the prerogative and granting assent.

The executive power is vested in the Crown and exercised "in-Council", meaning on the advice of the Executive Council; conventionally, this is the Cabinet, which is chaired by the premier and comprises ministers of the Crown.

== Premier and Executive Council ==
The term Government of Yukon, or more formally, His Majesty's Government refers to the activities of the Commissioner. The day-to-day operation and activities of the Government of Yukon are performed by the provincial departments and agencies, staffed by the non-partisan public service, and directed by the elected government.

=== Premier ===
The premier of Yukon is the primary minister of the Crown. The premier acts as the head of government for the province, chairs and selects the membership of the Cabinet, and advises the Commissioner on the exercise of executive power and much of the powers of prerogative. As premiers hold office by virtue of their ability to command the confidence of the elected Legislative Assembly, they sit as a member of the Legislative Assembly (MLA) and lead the largest party or a coalition in the Assembly. Once sworn in, the premier holds office until either they resign or removed by the Commissioner after either a motion of no confidence or defeat in a general election.

Currie Dixon has served as Premier since November 22, 2025, when he won the 2025 Yukon general election.

== See also ==
- Politics of Yukon
