= Harry Jerome Awards =

Canadian award

Harry Jerome Award
- Awarded for: Achievement in the Black community
- Country: Canada
- Presented by: Black Business and Professional Association
- First award: 1983
- Website: harryjeromeawards.com

The Harry Jerome Award is a Canadian award given to Black Canadians, established in 1983. The award is named after Harry Jerome and organized by the Black Business and Professional Association.

== Description ==
The award is organized by the Black Business and Professional Association and presented at an award ceremony in Toronto.

The award was launched in 1983 and is named after the Black olympian and racial equity activist Harry Jerome. The award is "widely considered among the most prestigious honours in Canada's black communities".

== History ==
In 2015, Tamar Huggins was among 15 winners. At the 35th award ceremony in 2017, 18 awardees were announced, including Andre De Grasse.

The 41st awards occurred in 2023, notable awardees included Andria Case, Lindell Wigginton and Ngozi Paul.

== List of winners ==
=== Academics ===
As of 2021, the academics award is awarded to an individual between the ages of 16 and 24.

Year	Recipient
2018	Kien Crosse
2017	Gabrielle Fletcher
2016	Happy Inibhunu
2015	Edmond Nankam Dzokou
2014	Andrew Ojo
2013	Monique Jarrett
2012	Eugenia Duodu
2011	Michelle McFarlane
2010	Kwesi Johnson
2009	Regine Debrosse
2008	Vera Muna
2007	Andrew D. Brown
2006	Ndija Anderson
2005	Martina Lawson-Isse
2004	Kersha Walker
2003	Lilian Moalim-Nour
2003	Danielle Gordon
2002	Tamara Gafoor
2002	Arisa Cox
2001	Hesper Phillip Chamberlain
2000	Janienne Foenander
2000	Kai James
1999	Zuwema Walters
1999	Husam Abdell-Qadir
1998	Kalkidan Belay
1998	Garfield Miller
1997	Jean Andre Marc Brown
1996	Imamu Osei Tomlinson
1996	Jason Humphreys
1995	Kofi Ofosu
1995	Yvonne Botchey
1994	Colleen Halliday
1994	Maydianne Andrade
1993	Natasha Johnson
1993	Annamie Paul
1992	Nathalie Campbell
1992	Candace Benjamin
1992	Ede Wilson
1991	Frank Lalonde
1991	Pauline Prince
1990	Nadia Scott
1990	Dumisa Adama
1989	Olga Jacqueline Brooks
1989	Dominick Shelton
1988	Phillip Mayers
1988	Herns Pierre-Jerome
1987	Leslie Allen
1987	Amorell Saunders
1986	David Lowe
1986	Brigette Arrindell
1985	Grace Allison Permaul
1985	Robert Mounsey
1984	Mark Holness
1984	Dawn Roach

=== Arts ===
As of 2021, the arts award is awarded to an individual over the ages of 24.

Year	Recipient
2020	Lyriq Bent
2019	Karen Burke
2018	Luke Welch
2017	Fabienne Colas
2016	Robert Small
2014	Nicole Brooks
2013	Andrea Douglas
2012	Errol Lee
2011	Kayla Perrin
2010	Michael Chambers
2009	Trey Anthony
2008	Cheryl Foggo
2007	Farley Flex
2006	Louis Mercier
2005	Rafaell Cabrera
2004	Martin Scott-Pascall
2003	Randi MacQueen
2003	Alison Sealy-Smith
2002	Weyni Mengesha
2002	Wes Williams
2001	Ullanda Neil
2001	Clement Virgo
2000	Kristopher Alexander
2000	Tiffany Kizzito
1999	Serena Lea
1998	Dwayne Morgan
1998	Djanet Sears
1997	Monique Allen
1996	Michele Joseph
1995	Joel Gordon
1995	Othalie Graham
1994	Maxine Greaves
1993	Kahlil Calder
1992	Marsh Pitt
1991	Melissa Adamson
1991	Stephanie Samuels
1990	Clayton Ellis
1990	Anais Granofsky
1989	Anne Louise
1989	Julie Pollard
1988	Atamere Omoruyi
1988	Devon Haughton
1987	John Devonish
1987	Denyse Thomasco
1986	Lorelei Eccleston
1985	Ronald Chambers
1984	Kevin Pugh

=== Athletics ===
As of 2021, the athletics award is awarded to an individual between the ages of 16 and 24.

Year	Recipient
2021	Jamaal Magloire
2020	Masai Ujiri
2019	Shaquille Smith
2018	Rowan Barrett Jr.
2017	Andre De Grasse
2016	Jamal Murray
2015	Cory Joseph
2014	Andrew Wiggins
2013	Quillan Roberts
2012	Tut Ruach
2011	Keneca Pingue-Giles
2010	Aaron Brown
2009	P.K. Subban
2008	Anne Olukemi Ogundele
2007	Brittnee Habbib
2006	Jaleesa Rhoden
2005	Tessa Thomas
2004	Matthew Black
2003	Sheldon Francis
2002	Omar Miles
2001	Arnel Scott
2000	Tijuana Cox
2000	Christopher Gudge
1999	Patrick Stephen
1998	Jude Timol
1998	Kerry Carter
1997	Marvin Brereton
1997	Tammy Sutton Brown
1997	Donovan Bailey
1996	Susan Stewart
1995	Natasha Bacchus
1994	Robert Esmie
1994	Kevin Weekes
1993	Tom Europe
1993	Sandra Hamilton
1992	Tenn Crichlow
1992	Stellah Umeh
1991	Cheryl Allen
1991	Michael Trought
1990	Kirk Johnson
1990	Chris Parris
1989	Carol Hamilton
1989	Lennox Lewis
1988	Curtis Hibbert
1988	Anton Skerritt
1987	Ian Boyce
1987	Michael Smith
1986	Darren Lowe
1986	Kyle McDuffie
1985	Rueben Mayes
1985	Martia Payne
1984	Angela Bailey
1984	Molly Killenbeck
1984	Atlee Mahorn
1983	Desai Williams
1983	Mark McCoy
1983	Ben Johnson
1983	Milt Ottey
1983	Tony Sharpe
1983	Angela Taylor-Issajenko

=== Business ===
As of 2021, the business award is awarded to an individual over the ages of 24.

Year	Recipient
2021	Louis Edgar Jean-Francois
2020	Cheryl Kerr
2019	Grace Foods Canada Inc.
2018	Lamont Wiltshire and Odeen Eccelston
2017	George Frempong
2016	Nadine Spencer
2014	Selwyn Richards
2013	Kemeel Azan
2012	Anthony Sterling
2011	Isaac Olowolafe
2010	Delores Lawrence
2009	Wayne Isaacs
2007	Emmanuel C. Mbulu
2006	Larry Gibson
2005	Kabu Asante
2004	Michael R. Duck
2003	Georgina Thompson
2002	Grace Carter-Henry Lyon
2001	Errol Johnson
2000	Phillip Vassell
2000	Donna McCurvin
1999	Albert Wiggins
1998	Al Green
1997	Jean Pierre
1996	Davis Felix Henry
1995	Ron King
1994	Leo Lewis
1993	Arnold Auguste
1991	Joseph Dadson
1991	Beverly Mascoll
1990	Carlton Brathwaite
1989	Roy Williams

=== Community Service ===
As of 2021, the community service award is awarded to an individual over the ages of 24.

Year	Recipient
2021	Velma Morgan
2020	Adam Lake
2019	Dr. Gezaghn Wordofa
2018	Keith Merith
2017	Ron Cunningham
2016	Francis Atta
2015	Wanda Thomas-Bernard
2014	Orlando Bowen
2013	Roz Roach
2012	Paul Barnett
2011	Ileen Pat Howell
2010	Winston La Rose
2009	Christopher Harris
2008	Roger Rowe
2007	Richard L.M. Lord
2006	Joyce Ross
2005	Maria Crawford
2005	Karen Warner
2004	Patricia Horsham
2003	Inez Elliston
2003	Francis Jeffers
2002	Howard McCurdy
2001	Ettie Dawkins
2000	Eslin Payne
1999	Veronica Sullivan
1999	Ned Blair
1998	Marlene Green
1997	Dwight Whylie
1996	Donald H. Oliver
1995	Kamala-Jean Gopie
1994	Al Mercury
1993	Carl Masters
1993	Dorothy Wills
1992	Isaac Akande
1992	John Brooks
1991	Clotilda Yakimchuk
1990	Bromley Armstrong
1988	Ruth Johnson
1988	Wilson Head
1987	Stanley Grizzle
1987	Lloyd Perry
1987	Calvin Ruck
1986	Carrie Best
1986	Alton Parker
1985	Harry Gairey
1985	Violet Blackman
1984	Donald Moore

=== Culture ===
Year	Recipient
2019	Frances-Anne Solomon

=== Decade Leader ===
Year	Recipient
2021	Dr. Joseph Smith

=== Diversity ===
Year	Recipient
2021	Kathy McDonald
2020	Jodie Glean
2018	Mike Yorke
2017	Dr. Barbara Trieloff-Deane
2016	Wendy Cukier
2015	Scott Mullin
2014	Susan Marjetti
2013	Jennifer Tory
2012	Armand La Barge
2011	John Tory

=== Entertainment ===
As of 2021, the entertainment award is awarded to an individual over the ages of 24.

Year	Recipient
2019	Exco Levi
2018	Jully Black
2017	Sharon Riley
2016	David Woods
2015	Wendy Jones
2014	Denise Jones
2013	Anne-Marie Woods
2012	Jay Douglas
2011	Muhtadi Thomas
2008	Anthony Sherwood

=== Health Sciences ===
As of 2021, the health sciences award is awarded to an individual over the ages of 24.

Year	Recipient
2019	Dr. Dominick Shelton
2018	Floydeen Charles Fridel
2017	Dr. Boluwaji Ogunyemi
2016	Simone Atungo
2015	Carrol Althea
2014	Rosemary Moodie
2013	Nadine Wong
2012	Godfrey Bacheyie
2011	Upton Allen
2010	Lisa Robinson
2009	Sheila McKenzie
2008	Stephen Blizzard
2007	Kwadwo O. Asante
2006	David Burt
2005	Sharon Whiting

=== Heritage ===
Year	Recipient
2012	Fitzroy Gordon

=== Humanitarian ===
Year	Recipient
2020	Samantha Mahfood

=== Leadership ===
Year	Recipient
2021	Ransford C. Jones
2020	Tanya Sinclair
2019	Wendy Beckles
2018	Carolyn Marful
2017	Leanne Prendergast
2016	Janelle Hinds
2015	Jelani Smith
2014	Madwa-Nika Phanord-Cadet
2013	Emilie Nicolas
2012	Julius Tapper
2011	LaShawn Murray
2010	Saron Gebresellassi
2009	Cameron Semple
2008	Emmanuel Ofori Atiah
2007	Tolu S. Quadri
2006	Simone Samuels
2005	David Green
2004	Runako Gregg
2003	Kristal Elliston
2002	Marlon Rhoden
2001	Kevin King
2000	Hassan Abukar
2000	Abena Evans
1999	Fana Seife
1999	Konata Lake
1998	Kemal Williamson
1997	Melissa Duncan
1997	Neckeisha Hudson
1996	Richard Appiah
1996	Njeri Campbell
1995	Wayne Adams
1995	Annetta Adu-Gyamfi
1994	Denise Campbell
1994	Malcolm Streete
1993	Aisha Wickham
1992	Cornell Wright

=== Legacy ===
Year	Recipient
2012	Irving Andre

=== Lifetime Achievement ===
Year	Recipient
2021	Ken Jeffers
2020	Trevor Massey
2019	S. I. Rustum Southwell
2018	Pamela Appelt
2017	Rev. Dr. Audley N. James
2016	Juanita Westmoreland-Traore
2015	Archie Alleyne
2014	Gregory Regis
2013	Grant Morris
2012	Hugh Graham
2011	Bromley Armstrong
2010	Stanley G. Grizzle
2008	Willie O’Ree
2007	Leebert Wright
2007	Ouida Wright
2006	J. Douglas Salmon
2005	George Ethelbert Carter
2004	Louise Bennett-Coverley
2003	Leon Bibb
2001	Lincoln Alexander
2000	Leonard Gibson
1999	Paul Winn
1994	Jodie Drake

=== Media ===
As of 2021, the media award is awarded to an individual over the ages of 24.

Year	Recipient
2021	Patricia Bebia Mawa
2019	Traci Melchor
2018	Matt Galloway
2016	Patricia J. Jaggernauth
2015	Nneka Elliott
2014	Rudy Blair
2013	Royson James
2012	Craig Smith
2011	Moses A. Mawa
2010	Ron Fanfair
2008	Marci Ien
2004	Tonya Lee Williams

=== President’s ===
Year	Recipient
2022	Amaka Umeh
2021	Dennis Mitchell
2020	Business of Little Jamaica
2019	Ray Williams
2018	Pauline Christian
2017	Wesley J. Hall
2016	David Bell
2015	Masai Ujiri
2014	Donald McLeod
2013	Vincent Lai
2012	Michael H. Tulloch
2011	G Raymond Chang
2010	Hamlin Grange
2008	Chris Spence
2007	Mary Tidlund
2006	Stephen Lewis
2005	Shawn James
2004	Jean-Paul Brown
2001	Rubin ‘Carter’ Henry
2000	Erma Collins
1999	Madeline Edwards
1998	Beverley Salmon
1997	Gwen Johnston
1997	Len Johnston
1996	Denham Jolly

=== Professional Excellence ===
As of 2021, the professional excellence award is awarded to an individual over the ages of 24.

Year	Recipient
2021	Al Ramsay
2020	Norma McCormack
2019	Leslyn Lewis
2018	Dr. Yabome Gilpin-Jackson
2017	Keith Spence
2016	Orin Isaacs
2015	Mark Beckles
2014	Kevin Hewitt
2013	Carl E. James
2012	Cordell Samuels
2011	Kevin Junor
2010	Akwatu Khenti
2009	Corrine Sparks
2008	Njoki Wane
2007	Peter Sloly
2006	Icilda Elliston
2005	Afua Cooper
2004	Donald Meeks
2003	Dorothy Thomas-Edding
2002	Leonard Braithwaite
2001	Jude Igwemezie
2000	Mayann Francis
1999	Fil Fraser
1998	Harold Brathwaite
1998	Carol Aylward
1997	Miriam Rossi
1996	Luther Hansraj
1995	Ronald Blake
1994	Alan Hobbins
1993	John Alleyne
1993	Garth Taylor
1992	Alwyn Spence

=== Public Advocacy ===
Year	Recipient
2018	Jenny Gumbs
2017	Isobel Granger
2015	Gerry McNeilly
2014	Jim Rankin

=== Social Engagement or Advocacy ===
Year	Recipient	
2017	Cheryl Nembhard	Social Advocacy
2015	Deputy Chief Rudolph André Crawford	Social Engagement

=== Technology & Innovation ===
Year	Recipient
2021	Claudette McGowan
2017	Dr. Juliet M. Daniel
2014	Collin Haughton
2013	Ray Williams
2012	David Tay
2011	John Akabutu
2010	Abdullah K. Kirumira
2009	Leesa Barnes
2008	Warren Salmon
2007	Victor Gooding
2006	Edward Ndububa
2005	Alexander MacGregor
2004	Amina Odidi
2004	Isa Odidi

=== Trailblazer ===
Year	Recipient
2019	Paulette Senior
2018	Dr. Kwame McKenzie
2017	Dr. Everton Gooden
2016	Mark Saunders
2013	Kevin W. Williams
2012	Damon Allen
2011	Daurene Lewis
2010	W. Andy Knight
2008	Alex MacGregor
2007	Jean Augustine
2007	Alvin Curling
2004	Perdita Felicien
2003	Jay Hope
2003	Keith Forde

=== Volunteer ===
Year	Recipient
2017	Chris Campbell
2005	Kevin Modeste
2005	Nicole Agard
2003	Carver Scobie
2001	Verlyn Francis
2000	Donald Cooper
2000	Debbie Innes
1999	Joyce Bannister
1999	Lisa Goldson

=== Young Entrepreneur ===
As of 2021, the young entrepreneur award is awarded to an individual between the ages of 18 and 35.

Year	Recipient
2021	Taylor Lindsay-Noel
2020	Nathan Hall
2019	Ross Simmonds
2018	Nadia Hamilton
2016	Samantha Clarke
2015	Tamar Huggins
2014	Brittany Palmer
2013	Tanya Walker
2012	Andrew Forde
2011	Jade Jager Clark
2010	Thomas Tewoldemedhin
2009	Mekielia Nembhard
2007	Rayonne D. Caesar
2006	Winston Stewart

=== Youth Advocacy or Advancement ===
Year	Recipient	
2017	Harriet Thornhill	Youth Advancement
2016	Kareena Elliston	Youth Advocacy
2015	Kareena Elliston	Youth Advocacy
2012	Senator Don Meredith	Youth Advocacy

== See also ==
- Lists of awards
- List of Black Canadians
