= Outline of Newfoundland and Labrador =

Overview of and topical guide to Newfoundland and Labrador

Flag of Newfoundland and Labrador

Coat of arms of Newfoundland and Labrador

Location of Newfoundland and Labrador

The following outline is provided as an overview of and topical guide to Newfoundland and Labrador.

Newfoundland and Labrador – the most easterly province of Canada. It comprises the island of Newfoundland, mainland Labrador, and over 7,000 small islands. It is Canada's ninth-most populous province or territory and tenth-largest in total area. A former colony and dominion of the United Kingdom, Newfoundland gave up its independence in 1933 and became the tenth province to enter the Canadian Confederation in 1949. Its name was officially changed to Newfoundland and Labrador in 2001.

== General reference ==
An enlargable map of Newfoundland and Labrador

- Pronunciation: locally /ˌnjuːfənˈlænd ... ˈlæbrədɔːr/ NEW-fən-LAND ... LAB-rə-dor
- Official English name: Newfoundland and Labrador
- Official French name: Terre-Neuve-et-Labrador
- Other names:
  - Talamh an Éisc agus Labradar in Newfoundland Irish
  - Ikkarumikluak ("place of many shoals" for Newfoundland) and Nunatsuak ("the big land" for Labrador) in Inuttitut
  - Taqamkuk (Newfoundland) in Mi'kmaq
- Nicknames:
  - Labrador: The Big Land
  - Newfoundland: The Rock
- Common endonym(s):
- Official endonym(s):
- Adjectival(s): Newfoundland and Labrador
- Demonym(s): Newfoundlander, Labradorian, Newfoundlanders and Labradorians, Newfie (colloquial, may be derisive)
- Telephone area code 709

== Geography ==
A relief map of Newfoundland and Labrador

Geography of Newfoundland and Labrador

- Newfoundland and Labrador is: a province of Canada.
- Canada is: a country
- Population of Newfoundland and Labrador: 526,702 (2016 Statistics Canada)
- Area of Newfoundland and Labrador: 405,212 km^{2} (156,500 sq mi)
  - 92.3% land
  - 7.7% water
- Atlas of Newfoundland and Labrador

=== Location ===
- Newfoundland and Labrador is situated within the following regions:
  - Northern Hemisphere, Western Hemisphere
    - Americas
      - North America
        - Northern America
          - Laurentia
            - Canada
              - Eastern Canada
                - Canadian Shield
                  - Labrador Peninsula
                - Appalachian Mountains
                  - Island of Newfoundland
- Time zones (see also Time in Canada):
  - Newfoundland Time Zone (UTC−03.5) officially; Atlantic Time (UTC−04) commonly used for Labrador
    - Daylight saving time (DST) observed from the 2nd Sunday in March to the 1st Sunday in November
- Extreme points of Newfoundland and Labrador
  - Highest point of Newfoundland and Labrador
- Landforms of Newfoundland and Labrador (category)

=== Environment ===
Köppen climate map of Newfoundland and Labrador

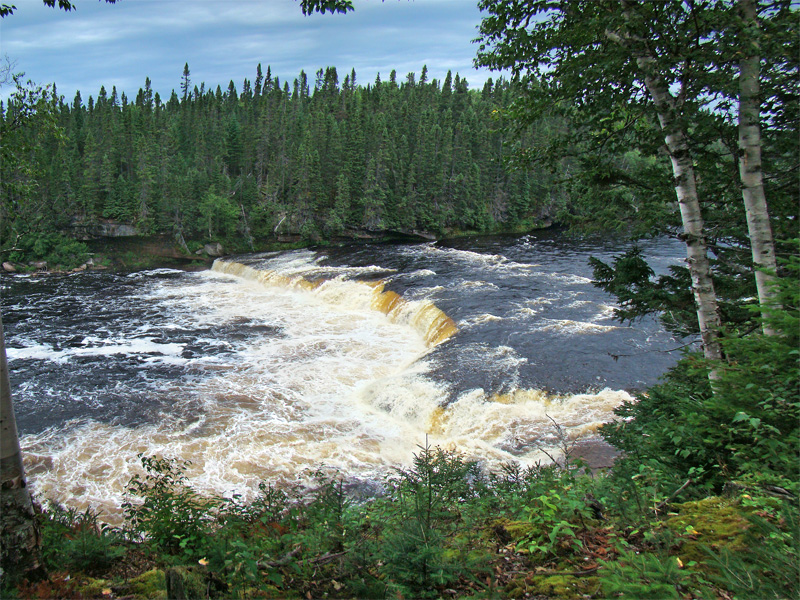
Sir Richard Squires Memorial Provincial Park

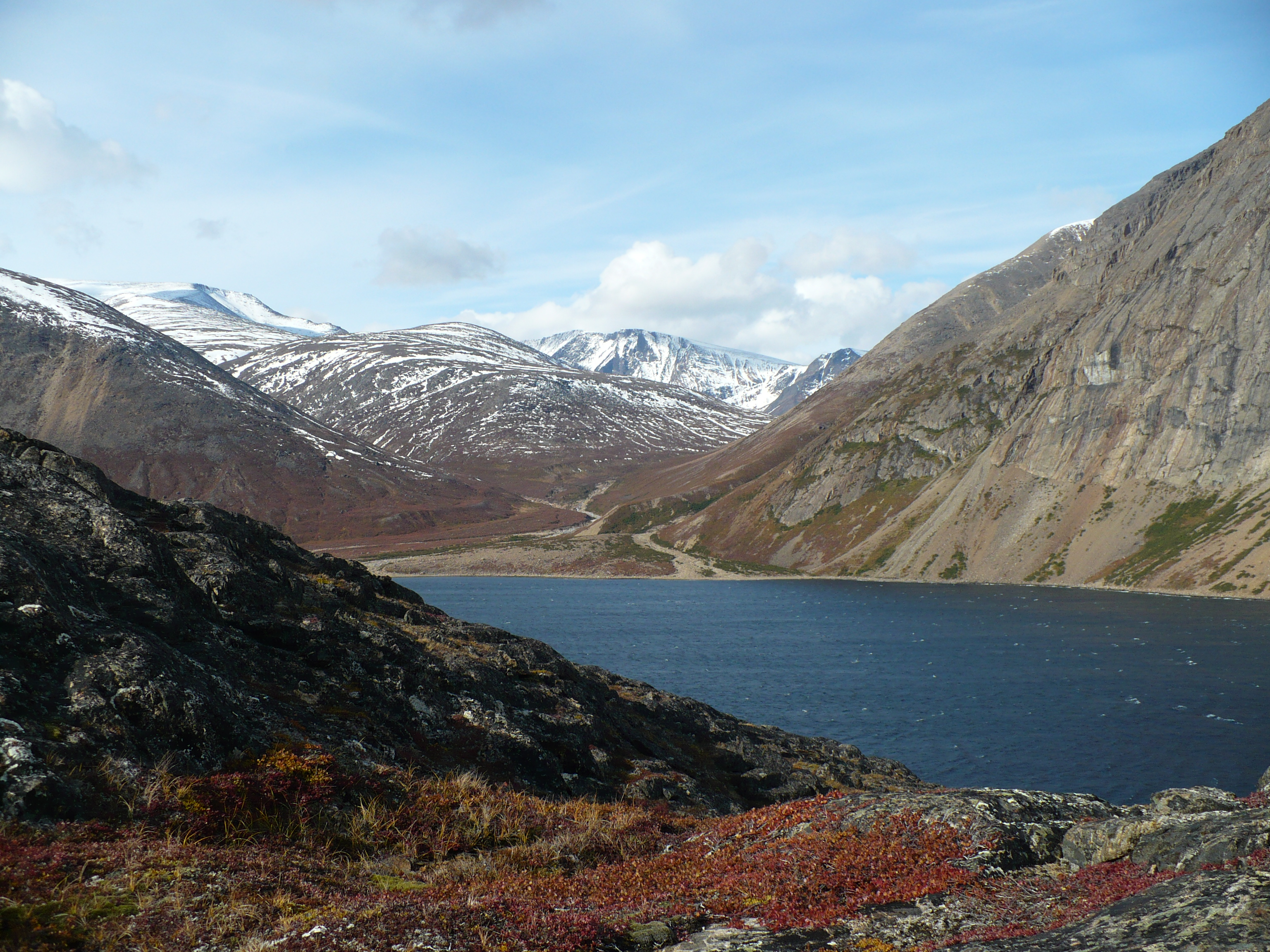
Torngat Mountains National Park

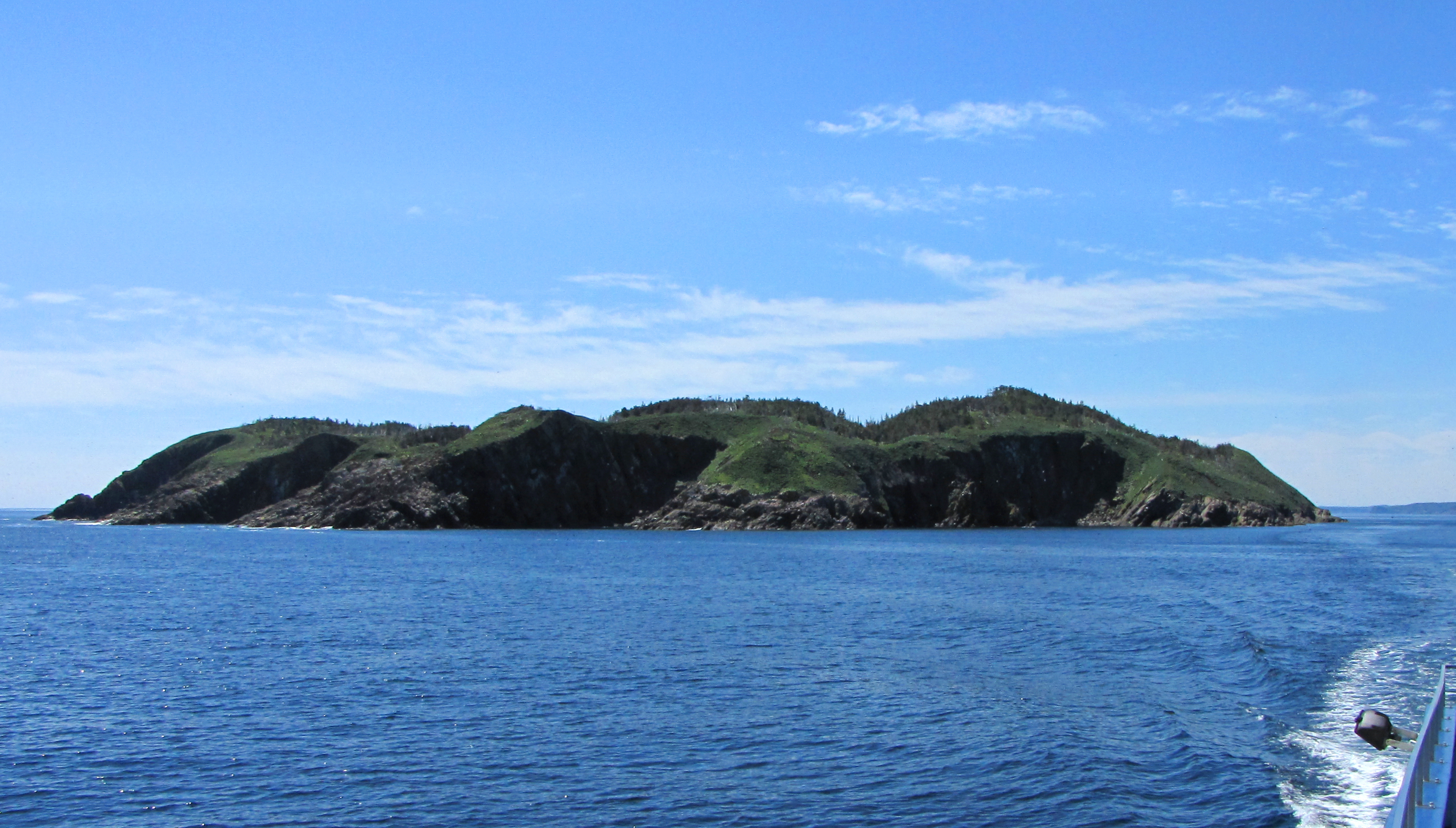
Witless Bay Ecological Reserve

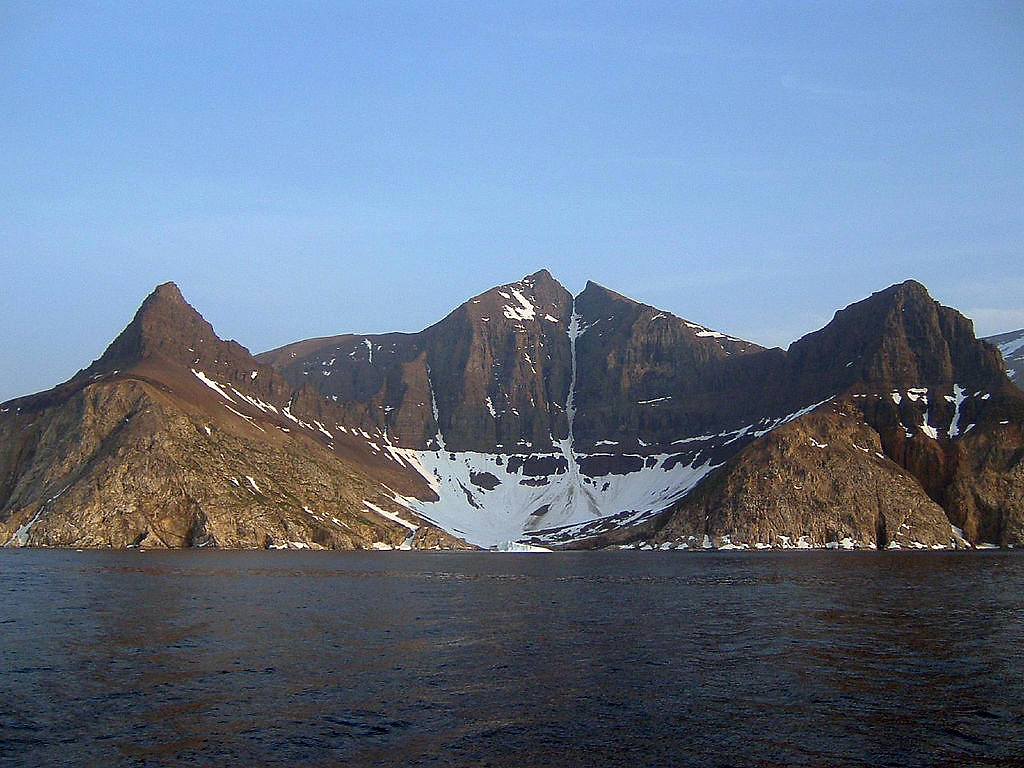
Bishop's Mitre

Environment of Canada

- Climate of Newfoundland and Labrador
- Ecology of Newfoundland and Labrador
  - Ecozones:
    - Marine ecozones:
      - Atlantic Marine Ecozone (south coast of Newfoundland)
      - Northwest Atlantic Marine Ecozone (coastal Labrador and north coast of Newfoundland)
    - Terrestrial ecozones:
      - Arctic Cordillera (northeastern Labrador Peninsula)
      - Boreal Shield Ecozone (western interior of Newfoundland)
        - Newfoundland Highland forests
      - Taiga Shield Ecozone (most of Labrador)
- Geology of Newfoundland and Labrador
  - Geology of Newfoundland and Labrador (category)
  - List of dateable fossil discoveries in Newfoundland and Labrador
- Protected areas of Newfoundland and Labrador
  - Wilderness and Ecological Reserves
  - National parks in Newfoundland and Labrador
    - List of National Parks of Canada § Newfoundland and Labrador
  - List of designated places in Newfoundland and Labrador
  - List of historic places in Newfoundland and Labrador
    - List of historic places in Labrador
  - List of National Historic Sites of Canada in Newfoundland and Labrador (46)
  - Provincial parks of Newfoundland and Labrador
- Wildlife of Canada in Newfoundland and Labrador
  - List of flora of Newfoundland and Labrador
  - List of fauna of Newfoundland and Labrador
    - Birds of Newfoundland and Labrador
    - Mammals of Newfoundland

==== Natural geographic features ====
Landforms of Newfoundland and Labrador (category)

- Fjords of Newfoundland and Labrador
- Peninsulas of Newfoundland and Labrador (category)
- List of islands of Newfoundland and Labrador
- Lakes of Newfoundland and Labrador
- List of dams and reservoirs in Newfoundland and Labrador
- Rivers of Newfoundland and Labrador
- Waterfalls of Newfoundland and Labrador
- Mountains of Newfoundland and Labrador
  - Mountain ranges of Newfoundland and Labrador (category)
  - Volcanoes in Newfoundland and Labrador
    - Volcanism of Newfoundland and Labrador (category)
    - Volcanoes of Newfoundland and Labrador (category)
- Valleys of Newfoundland and Labrador (category)

=== Heritage sites ===
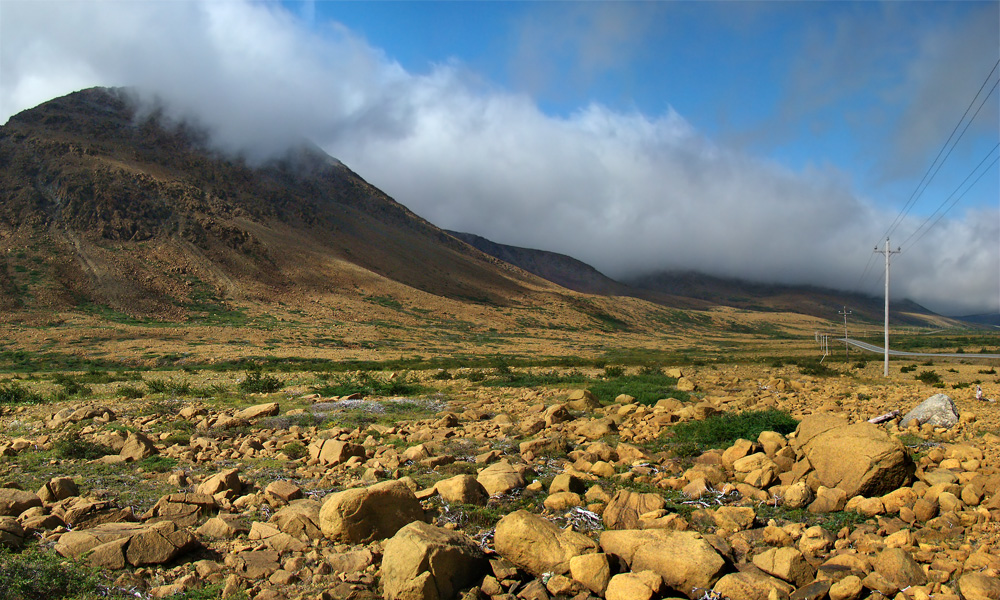
Gros Morne National Park

- World Heritage Sites in Newfoundland and Labrador (4)
  - L'Anse aux Meadows
  - Gros Morne National Park
  - Mistaken Point Ecological Reserve
  - Red Bay Basque Whaling Station
- National Historic Sites in Newfoundland and Labrador

=== Regions ===
- Labrador
  - Central Labrador
  - Western Labrador
  - Nunatsiavut (the north coast region)
  - Nunatukavut (the south coast region)
- Island of Newfoundland
  - South coast
    - Avalon Peninsula
    - Burin Peninsula
    - Bonavista Peninsula
  - Northeast coast
    - Great Northern Peninsula
  - West coast
    - Bay of Islands
    - Bay St. George
    - Bay St. George South
    - Port au Port Peninsula

==== Administrative divisions ====
- Census divisions of Newfoundland and Labrador
  - List of census agglomerations in Newfoundland and Labrador
  - List of census divisions of Newfoundland and Labrador
- List of communities in Newfoundland and Labrador
  - List of Newfoundland and Labrador communities by population
  - Newfoundland outports
- List of ghost towns in Newfoundland and Labrador
- List of municipalities in Newfoundland and Labrador
- List of Newfoundland and Labrador federal electoral districts
  - Avalon
  - Bonavista–Burin–Trinity
  - Coast of Bays–Central–Notre Dame
  - Labrador
  - Long Range Mountains
  - St. John's East
  - St. John's South–Mount Pearl
- List of Newfoundland and Labrador provincial electoral districts
  - Baie Verte–Green Bay
  - Bonavista
  - Burgeo–La Poile
  - Burin–Grand Bank
  - Cape St. Francis
  - Carbonear–Trinity–Bay de Verde
  - Cartwright–L'Anse au Clair
  - Conception Bay East–Bell Island
  - Conception Bay South
  - Corner Brook
  - Exploits
  - Ferryland
  - Fogo Island–Cape Freels
  - Fortune Bay–Cape La Hune
  - Gander
  - Grand Falls–Windsor–Buchans
  - Harbour Grace–Port de Grave
  - Harbour Main
  - Humber–Bay of Islands
  - Humber–Gros Morne
  - Labrador West
  - Lake Melville
  - Lewisporte–Twillingate
  - Mount Pearl North
  - Mount Pearl–Southlands
  - Mount Scio
  - Placentia–St. Mary's
  - Placentia West–Bellevue
  - St. Barbe–L'Anse aux Meadows
  - St. George's–Humber
  - St. John's Centre
  - St. John's East–Quidi Vidi
  - St. John's West
  - Stephenville–Port au Port
  - Terra Nova
  - Topsail–Paradise
  - Torngat Mountains
  - Virginia Waters–Pleasantville
  - Waterford Valley
  - Windsor Lake
List of population centres in Newfoundland and Labrador

===== Indian reserves =====
- List of Indian reserves in Newfoundland and Labrador

===== Municipalities =====
List of municipalities in Newfoundland and Labrador

- Population centres in Newfoundland and Labrador
- Municipalities by type
  - Cities of Newfoundland and Labrador
    - Capital of Newfoundland and Labrador: St. John's
    - Corner Brook
    - Mount Pearl
  - Towns in Newfoundland and Labrador
  - Villages in Newfoundland and Labrador
  - Communities in Newfoundland and Labrador

=== Demography ===
Demographics of Newfoundland and Labrador

- List of population centres in Newfoundland and Labrador
- Population compared to other provinces

== Government and politics ==
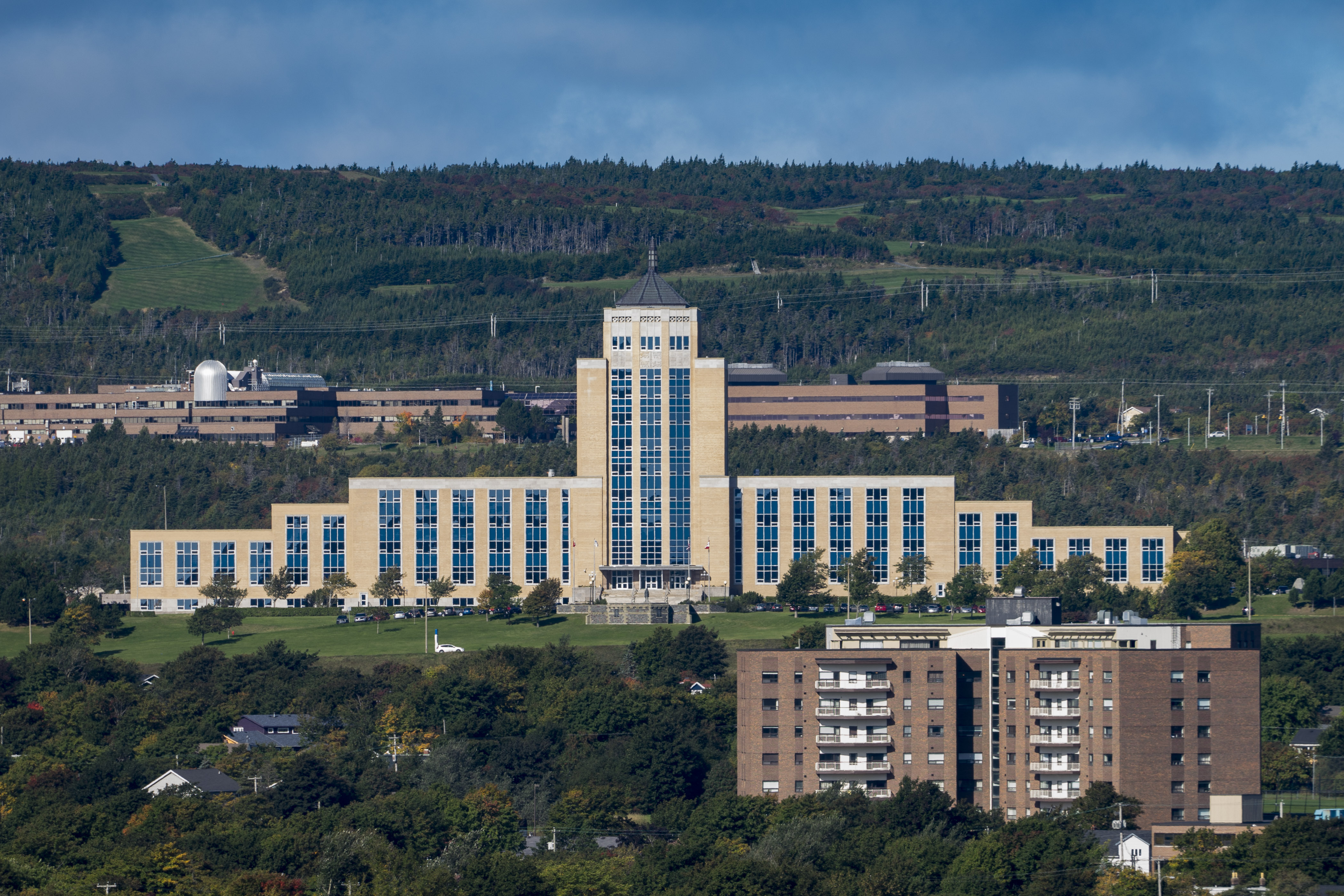
The Confederation Building

Politics of Newfoundland and Labrador

- Form of government: parliamentary constitutional monarchy
- Capital of Newfoundland and Labrador: St. John's
- Elections in Newfoundland and Labrador
  - List of Newfoundland and Labrador general elections
  - List of Newfoundland and Labrador by-elections
- Political parties in Newfoundland and Labrador

=== Government branches ===
Government of Newfoundland and Labrador

==== Executive branch ====
- Head of state: King in Right of Newfoundland and Labrador, King of Canada, King Charles III
  - Head of state's representative (Viceroy): Lieutenant Governor of Newfoundland and Labrador, Joan Marie Aylward
    - Previous lieutenant governors
    - Head of government: Premier of Newfoundland and Labrador, Tony Wakeham
      - Previous premiers
        - Premiers of Newfoundland and Labrador by time in office
      - Cabinet: Executive Council of Newfoundland and Labrador
        - Head of council: Lieutenant Governor in Council, as representative of the King in Right of Newfoundland and Labrador
      - Departments of the Newfoundland and Labrador government
        - Department of Advanced Education and Skills
        - Department of Child, Youth and Family Services
        - Department of Education and Early Childhood Development (Newfoundland and Labrador)
        - Department of Environment and Conservation (Newfoundland and Labrador)
        - Department of Finance (Newfoundland and Labrador)
        - Department of Fisheries and Aquaculture (Newfoundland and Labrador)
        - Department of Health and Community Services (Newfoundland and Labrador)
        - Department of Innovation, Business and Rural Development
        - Department of Justice and Public Safety (Newfoundland and Labrador)
        - Department of Labrador and Aboriginal Affairs (Newfoundland and Labrador)
        - Department of Natural Resources
          - Geological Survey of Newfoundland and Labrador
        - Department of Municipal and Intergovernmental Affairs (Newfoundland and Labrador)
        - Department of Seniors, Wellness and Social Development (Newfoundland and Labrador)
        - Department of Services NL
        - Department of Transportation and Works (Newfoundland and Labrador)

==== Legislative branch ====
- Parliament of Newfoundland and Labrador (unicameral): Newfoundland and Labrador House of Assembly
  - Speaker of the House of Assembly of Newfoundland and Labrador: vacant
  - Leader of the Opposition (Newfoundland and Labrador): Ches Crosby
  - Confederation Building (Newfoundland and Labrador)
  - 48th General Assembly of Newfoundland and Labrador

==== Judicial branch ====
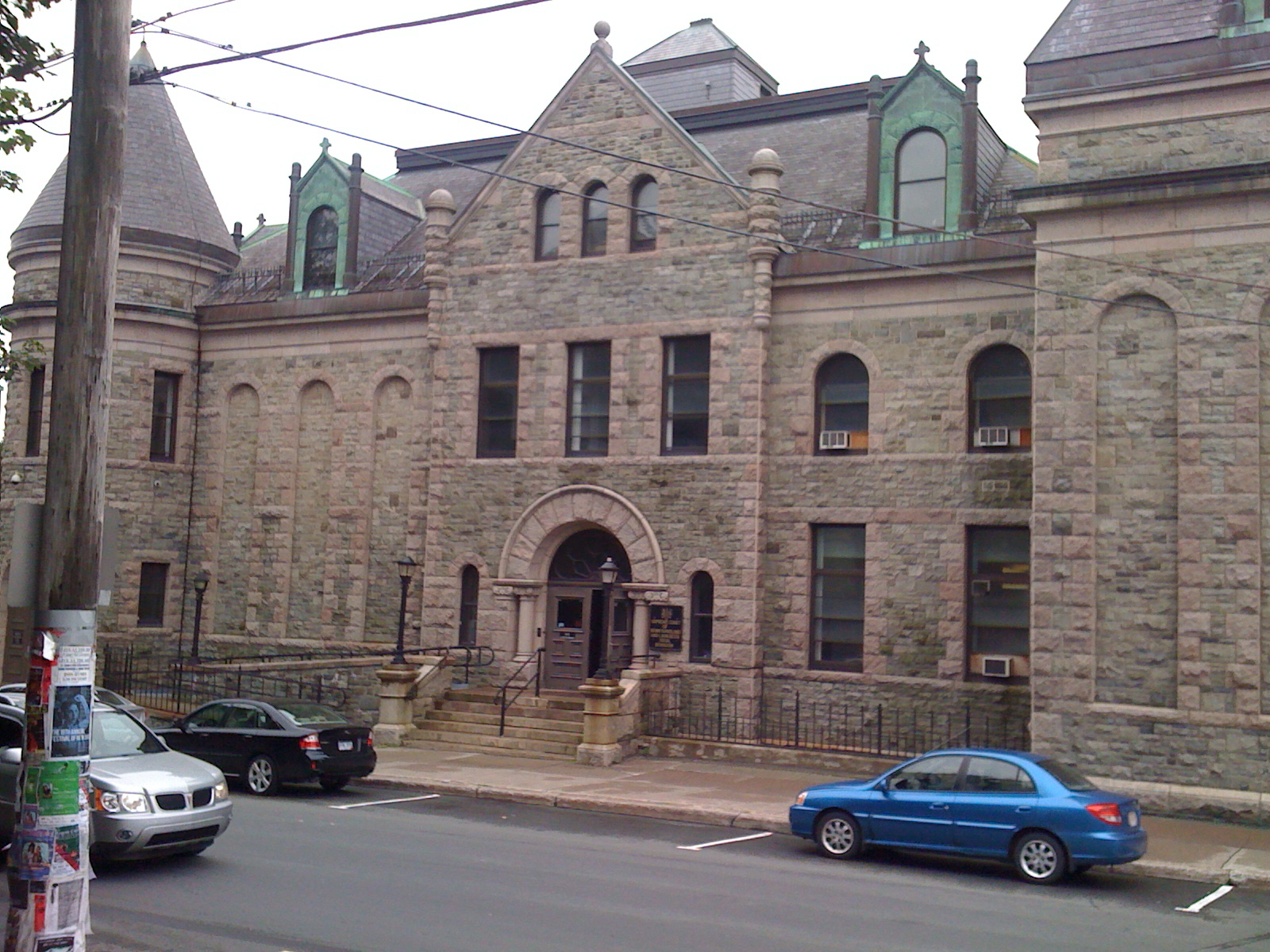
Supreme Court of Newfoundland and Labrador, Trial Division entrance

- Federal Courts of Canada
  - Supreme Court of Canada
  - Federal Court of Appeal
  - Tax Court of Canada
- Canadian court of appeal: Newfoundland and Labrador Court of Appeal
- Superior court: Supreme Court of Newfoundland and Labrador
  - Supreme Court of Newfoundland and Labrador (Court of Appeal)
- Provincial Court: Court of Newfoundland and Labrador
  - The Civil Division
  - The Criminal and Penal Division
  - The Youth Division
- Military court: Court Martial Appeal Court of Canada

=== Regional relations ===
- Atlantic Provinces Economic Council
- proposed Atlantic Union

=== International relations ===
- Ireland Newfoundland Partnership

=== Law and order ===
Law of Newfoundland and Labrador

- Bar of Newfoundland and Labrador – the provincial law society for lawyers in Newfoundland and Labrador
- Capital punishment: none.
  - Newfoundland and Labrador, as with all of Canada, does not have capital punishment.
  - Canada eliminated the death penalty for murder on July 14, 1976.
- Constitution of Newfoundland and Labrador
- Criminal justice system of Newfoundland and Labrador
- Crime in Newfoundland and Labrador (category)
  - Organized crime in Newfoundland and Labrador
- Human rights in Newfoundland and Labrador
  - LGBT rights in Newfoundland and Labrador
    - Same-sex marriage in Newfoundland and Labrador
- Law enforcement
  - Royal Newfoundland Constabulary (urban areas such as St. John's, Corner brook and Labrador West)
  - Local municipal police forces (where such exist)
  - Royal Canadian Mounted Police (contracted to patrol the rest of the province)
- Correctional services in Newfoundland and Labrador

=== Military ===
Canadian Forces (Being a part of Canada, Newfoundland and Labrador does not have its own military.)

- Canadian Forces bases in Newfoundland and Labrador (category)

=== Local government ===
Local government in Newfoundland and Labrador

- List of mayors of St. John's, Newfoundland and Labrador

== History ==
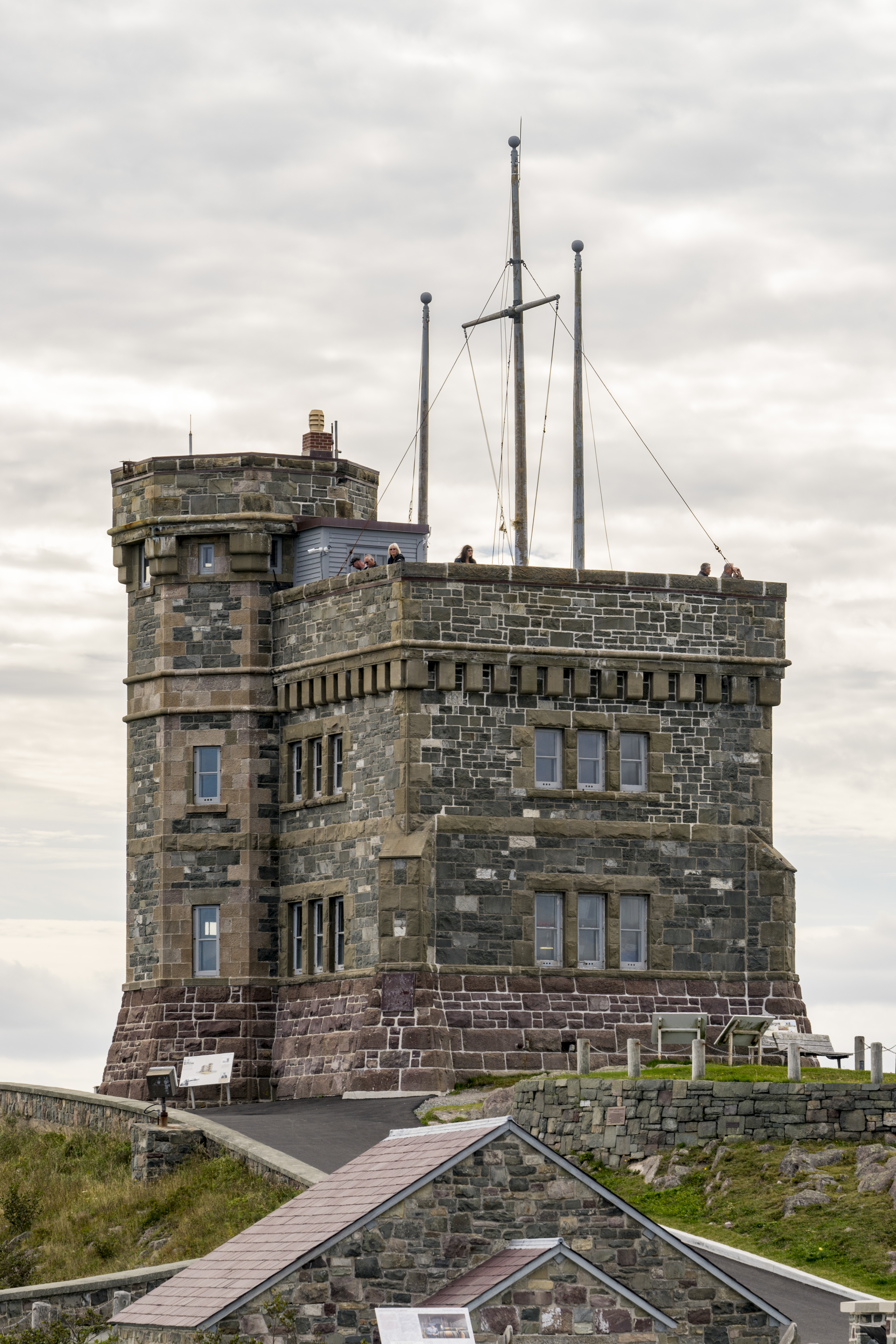
Cabot Tower in St. John's

History of Newfoundland and Labrador

=== History, by period ===
History of Newfoundland and Labrador by period (category)

- Beothuk
- Newfoundland Colony § History
- Dominion of Newfoundland § History

=== History, by region ===
- Labrador § History
- Newfoundland (island)#History
  - Province of Avalon § History
  - St. John's, Newfoundland and Labrador#History

=== History, by subject ===
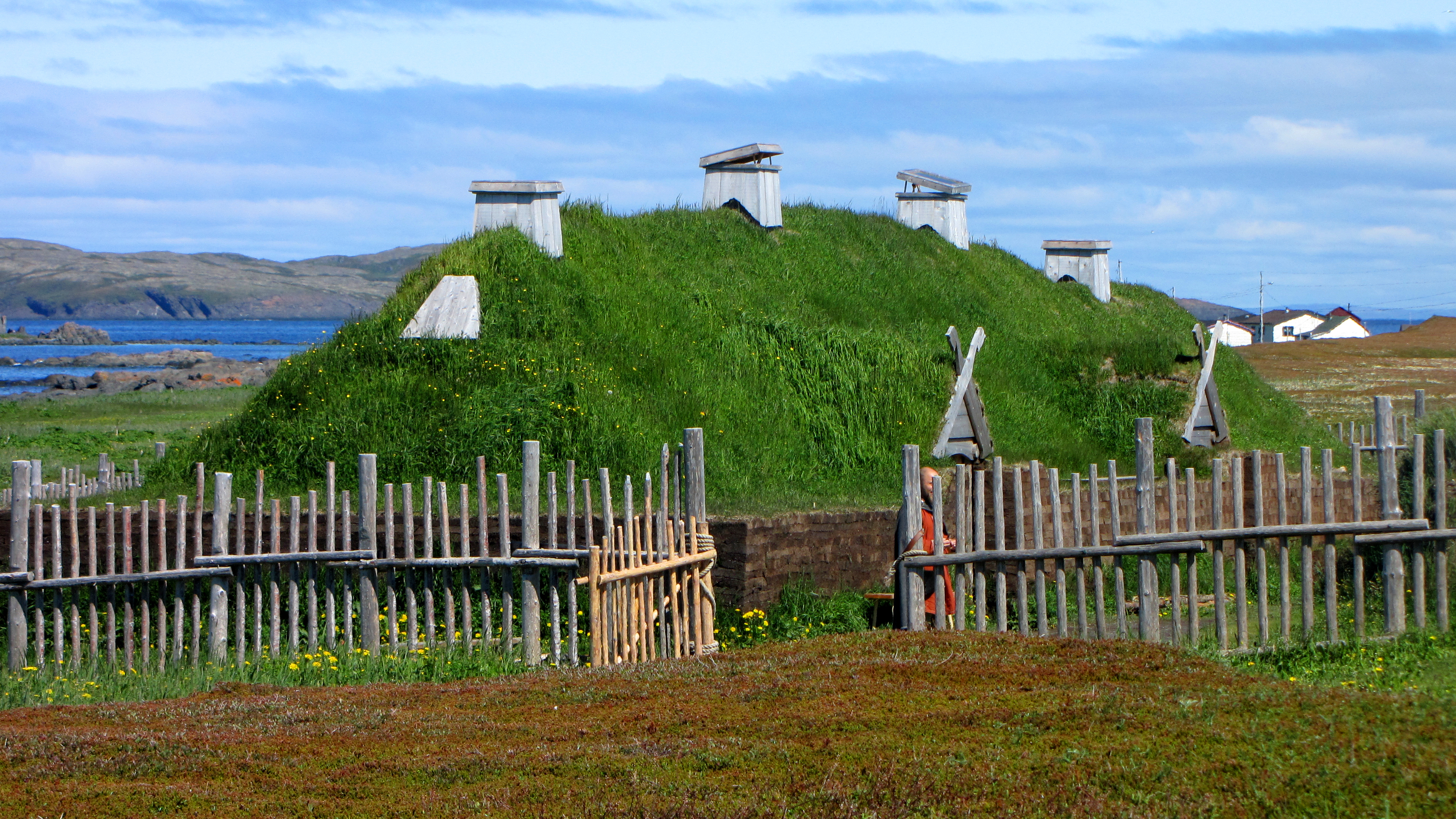
L'Anse aux Meadows on Newfoundland, site of a Norse colony

- Abandoned colonies
  - L'Anse aux Meadows, possibly Leifsbudir, c.1000
  - South Falkland, f.1623
- Disasters in Newfoundland and Labrador (category)
- Economic history of Newfoundland and Labrador
  - History of Fisheries of Newfoundland and Labrador
    - Collapse of the Atlantic northwest cod fishery
    - Turbot War
    - Migratory Fishery of Labrador
    - History of Basque whaling § Newfoundland and Labrador
  - History of the petroleum industry in Canada (frontier exploration and development)
- Military history of Newfoundland and Labrador (category)
  - Battle of Placentia (1692)
  - Newfoundland Campaign (1744)

== Culture ==
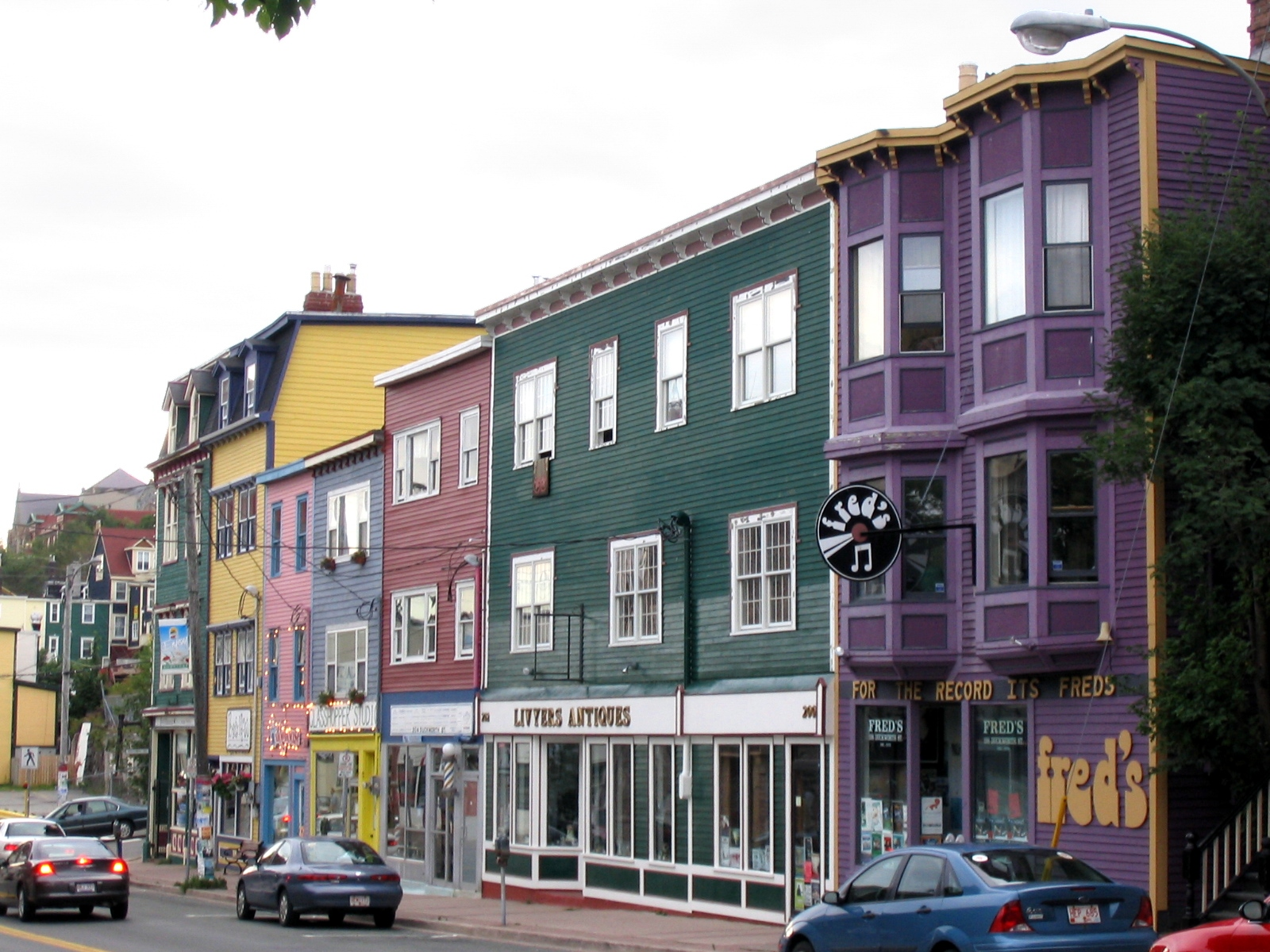
Heritage buildings on Duckworth Street, St. John's

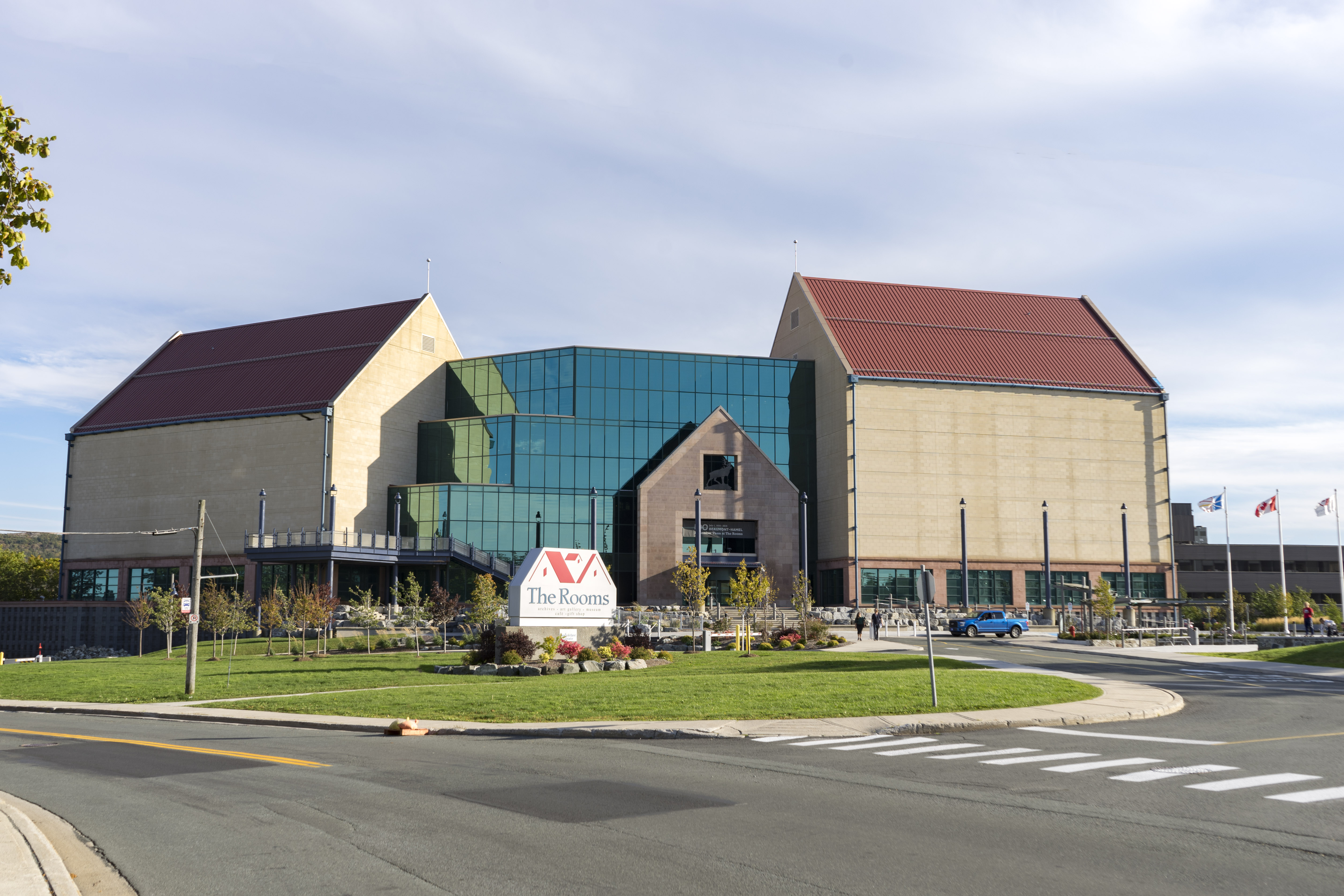
The Rooms cultural facility

Culture of Newfoundland and Labrador (category)

- Buildings and structures in Newfoundland and Labrador (category)
  - Architecture of St. John's, Newfoundland and Labrador
    - List of buildings in St. John's, Newfoundland and Labrador
    - List of tallest buildings in St. John's, Newfoundland and Labrador
- Cuisine of Newfoundland and Labrador (category)
  - Newfoundland Screech
  - Restaurants in Newfoundland and Labrador (category)
- Festivals in Newfoundland and Labrador (category)
- Heritage Foundation of Newfoundland and Labrador
- Mass media in Newfoundland and Labrador (category)
  - Media in St. John's, Newfoundland and Labrador
- Museums in Newfoundland and Labrador
- Order of precedence in Newfoundland and Labrador
- People from Newfoundland and Labrador (category)
  - English Canadians#Newfoundland (and Labrador)
  - Irish Newfoundlanders
  - Franco-Newfoundlanders
  - NunatuKavut people
  - Mushuau Innu First Nation
  - Qalipu Mi'kmaq First Nation Band
- Prostitution in Newfoundland and Labrador
- Public holidays in Newfoundland and Labrador
  - Memorial Day (Newfoundland and Labrador)
- Public libraries in Newfoundland and Labrador
- Provincial Archives of Newfoundland and Labrador
- Regional culture in Newfoundland and Labrador (culture by region)
  - (list)
- Scouting and Guiding in Newfoundland and Labrador
- Languages
  - Newfoundland English
  - Newfoundland Irish and Irish language in Newfoundland
  - Newfoundland French

=== Art ===
- Art of Newfoundland and Labrador
- Cinema of Newfoundland and Labrador (category)
- Dance of Newfoundland and Labrador
- Humour of Newfoundland and Labrador
- Literature of Newfoundland and Labrador
- Music of Newfoundland and Labrador
  - List of musicians from Newfoundland and Labrador
- Television shows shot in Newfoundland and Labrador (category)
  - List of television stations in Newfoundland and Labrador
- Theatre in Newfoundland and Labrador

=== Religion ===
As of 2011, Christians (shown in blue) made up approximately 93% of the population of Newfoundland and Labrador.

Religion in Newfoundland and Labrador – largely Protestant, with non-Christian religions making up less than half a percent of the population

- Christianity in Newfoundland and Labrador
  - Anglicanism in Newfoundland and Labrador
    - Diocese of Central Newfoundland
    - Diocese of Eastern Newfoundland and Labrador
    - Diocese of Western Newfoundland
  - Roman Catholicism in Newfoundland and Labrador
    - Roman Catholic Archdiocese of St. John's, Newfoundland
    - Roman Catholic Diocese of Corner Brook and Labrador
    - Roman Catholic Diocese of Grand Falls
- Irreligion in Canada
- Islam in Canada
  - Masjid-an-Noor, Newfoundland
- Hinduism in Canada
  - St. John's Hindu Temple
- Judaism in Newfoundland and Labrador
  - Beth El Synagogue, Newfoundland
- Buddhism in Canada
- Sikhism in Canada

=== Sports ===
Sports in Newfoundland and Labrador

- Curling in Newfoundland and Labrador
  - Curling clubs in Newfoundland and Labrador
- Ice hockey in Newfoundland and Labrador
  - Hockey Newfoundland and Labrador
  - Ice hockey teams in Newfoundland and Labrador
  - Ice hockey venues in Newfoundland and Labrador (category)
- Rugby in Newfoundland and Labrador
- Cricket in Newfoundland and Labrador
- Association football in Newfoundland and Labrador
- Gaelic games in Newfoundland and Labrador
- Sports clubs and teams in Newfoundland and Labrador (category)

=== Symbols ===
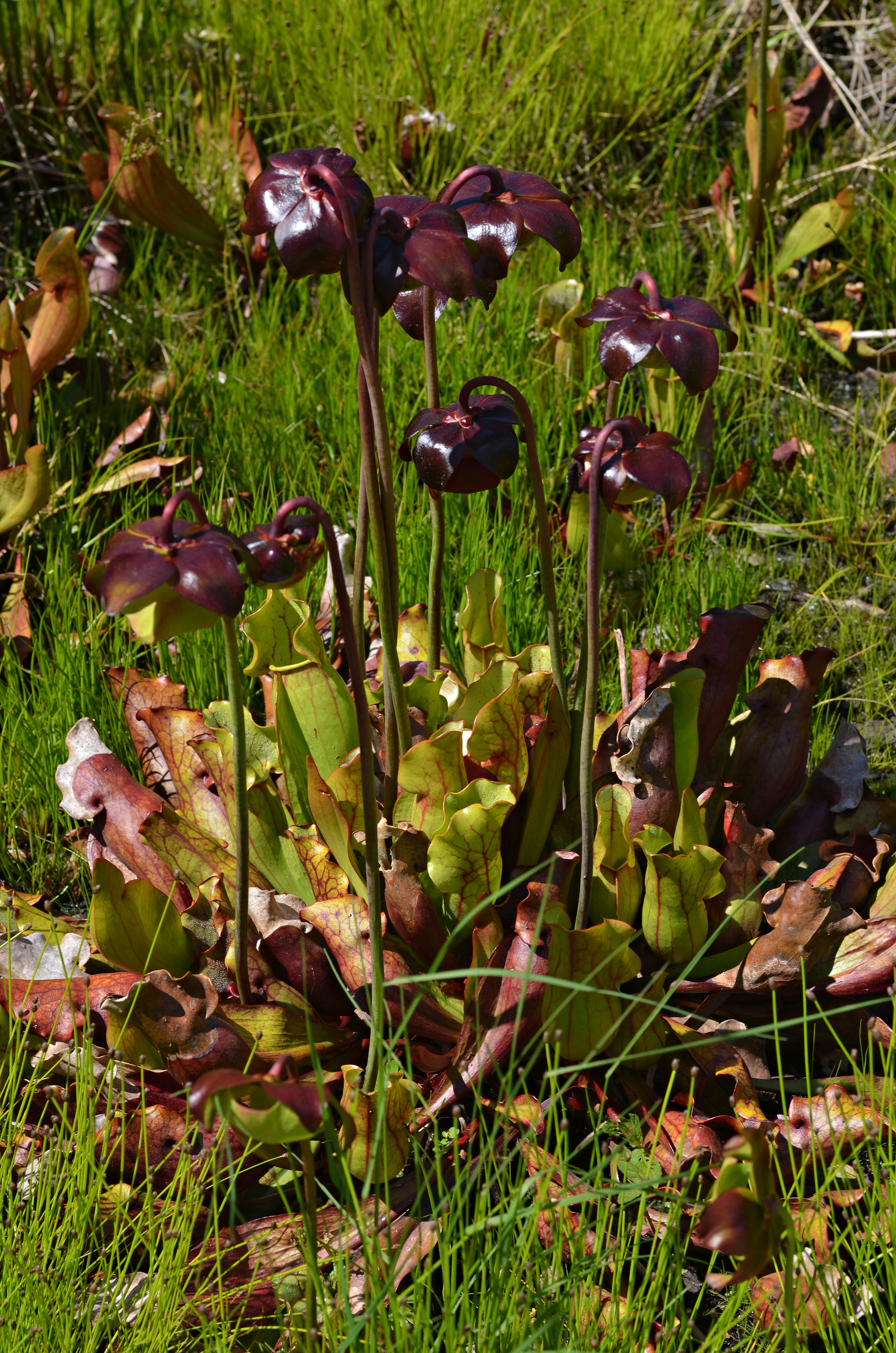
Sarracenia purpurea, pitcher plant

Symbols of Newfoundland and Labrador

- Coat of arms of Newfoundland and Labrador
- Flag of Newfoundland and Labrador
- Great Seal of Newfoundland and Labrador
- Provincial flower: pitcher plant
- Provincial bird: Atlantic puffin
- Provincial tree: black spruce
- Provincial animal: caribou
- Provincial mineral: Labradorite
- Provincial motto: Quaerite prime regnum Dei (Latin) – "Seek ye first the kingdom of God" (Matthew 6:33)
- Provincial anthem: "Ode to Newfoundland"
- Provincial capital: St. John's

== Economy and infrastructure ==
Economy of Newfoundland and Labrador

- Economic rank (by nominal GDP) – This ranking shows only the Rank of Canada, the country in which is located Newfoundland and Labrador
- Agriculture in Newfoundland and Labrador
- Fishing industry in Canada
  - Cod fishing in Newfoundland
  - Grand Banks
- Hunting in Newfoundland
  - Seal hunting
- Forestry in Newfoundland and Labrador
- Banking in Newfoundland and Labrador
- Telecommunications in Newfoundland and Labrador
  - Internet in Newfoundland and Labrador
  - Radio stations in Newfoundland and Labrador
    - Broadcasting Corporation of Newfoundland
  - Television stations in Newfoundland and Labrador
- Companies in Newfoundland and Labrador (category)
- Currency of Newfoundland and Labrador – as a province, Newfoundland and Labrador uses the currency of Canada.
- Energy in Newfoundland and Labrador (category)
  - Environmental and energy policy of Newfoundland and Labrador
  - Electricity sector in Newfoundland and Labrador
    - Electrical generating stations in Newfoundland and Labrador
      - Hydroelectric generating stations in Newfoundland and Labrador
      - Wind farms in Newfoundland and Labrador
      - Biomass and fossil fuel power stations in Newfoundland and Labrador
    - Hydroelectricity in Canada § Newfoundland and Labrador
    - Newfoundland and Labrador Hydro
  - Oil industry in Newfoundland and Labrador
    - Oil fields: Hebron-Ben Nevis, Hibernia, Terra Nova, and White Rose
- Health care in Newfoundland and Labrador
  - List of hospitals in Newfoundland and Labrador
  - Health and Community Services Western Region
  - Emergency medical services in Newfoundland and Labrador
- Mining in Newfoundland and Labrador (category)
  - Central Mineral Belt, Labrador
  - Mines in Newfoundland and Labrador (category)
- Tourism in Canada § Newfoundland and Labrador
- Water supply and sanitation in Newfoundland and Labrador
- Research & Development Corporation Newfoundland and Labrador

=== Transport ===
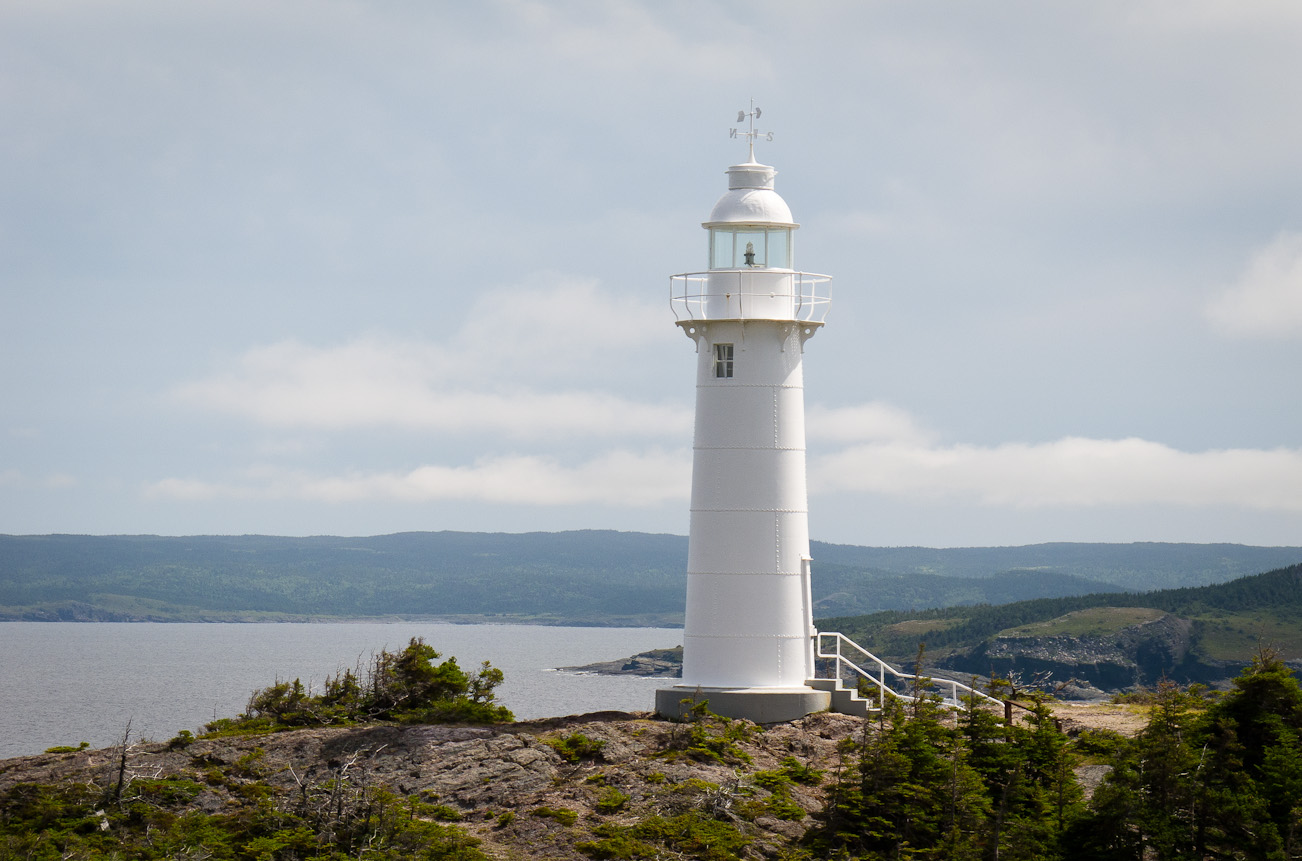
King's Cove Head lighthouse in King's Cove

Transport in Newfoundland and Labrador (category)

- Air transport in Newfoundland and Labrador
  - Airlines of Newfoundland and Labrador
  - Airports in Newfoundland and Labrador
- Rail transport in Newfoundland and Labrador (category)
  - Newfoundland Railway (defunct)
  - Quebec North Shore and Labrador Railway
  - Western Labrador Rail Services
- Road transport in Newfoundland and Labrador
  - Vehicle registration plates of Newfoundland and Labrador
  - Roads in Newfoundland and Labrador
    - Highways in Newfoundland and Labrador
      - Newfoundland and Labrador Route 1 – Trans-Canada Highway
      - Trans-Labrador Highway
  - Bus transport in Newfoundland and Labrador (category)
  - Public transport in Newfoundland and Labrador (category)
- Water transport in Newfoundland and Labrador (category)
  - Ferry transport in Newfoundland and Labrador (category)
  - List of lighthouses in Newfoundland and Labrador

== Education ==
Education in Newfoundland and Labrador (category)

- Primary education in Newfoundland and Labrador
  - School districts in Newfoundland and Labrador
    - Eastern School District of Newfoundland and Labrador
  - Grade school in Newfoundland and Labrador
  - High school in Newfoundland and Labrador
- Higher education in Newfoundland and Labrador
  - Public colleges in Newfoundland and Labrador
- Museums in Newfoundland and Labrador

== See also ==
- Index of Newfoundland and Labrador-related articles
- Outline of geography
  - Outline of North America
    - Outline of Canada
      - Outline of Alberta
      - Outline of British Columbia
      - Outline of Manitoba
      - Outline of New Brunswick
      - Outline of Nova Scotia
      - Outline of Ontario
      - Outline of Quebec
      - Outline of Prince Edward Island
      - Outline of Saskatchewan
- National War Memorial (Newfoundland)
- List of people from Newfoundland and Labrador
- Encyclopedia of Newfoundland and Labrador
- Auditor General of Newfoundland and Labrador
- List of Newfoundland and Labrador senators
- Order of Newfoundland and Labrador
- Vehicle registration plates of Newfoundland and Labrador
- Elections Newfoundland and Labrador
- Newfoundland and Labrador Federation of Labour
- Newfoundland and Labrador Medical Association
- Newfoundland School Society
- Newfoundland and Labrador Youth Parliament

=== Categories ===
- Category:Accidental deaths in Newfoundland and Labrador
- Category:Aerospace museums in Newfoundland and Labrador
- Category:Airports in Newfoundland and Labrador
- Category:Anglican church buildings in Newfoundland and Labrador
- Category:Art museums and galleries in Newfoundland and Labrador
- Category:Aviation in Newfoundland and Labrador
- Category:Bays of Newfoundland and Labrador
- Category:Bike paths in Newfoundland and Labrador
- Category:Bodies of water of Newfoundland and Labrador
- Category:Borders of Newfoundland and Labrador
- Category:Buildings and structures in Newfoundland and Labrador
- Category:Bus transport in Newfoundland and Labrador
- Category:Canadian Forces bases in Newfoundland and Labrador
- Category:Deaths from cancer in Newfoundland and Labrador
- Category:Candidates in Newfoundland and Labrador provincial elections
- Category:Census divisions of Newfoundland and Labrador
- Category:Christianity in Newfoundland and Labrador
- Category:Churches in Newfoundland and Labrador
- Category:Cinema of Newfoundland and Labrador
- Category:Cities in Newfoundland and Labrador
- Category:Communications in Newfoundland and Labrador
- Category:Companies based in Newfoundland and Labrador
- Category:Crime in Newfoundland and Labrador
- Category:Crown corporations of Newfoundland and Labrador
- Category:Culture of Newfoundland and Labrador
- Category:Curling in Newfoundland and Labrador
- Category:Dams in Newfoundland and Labrador
- Category:Death in Newfoundland and Labrador
- Category:Deaths by firearm in Newfoundland and Labrador
- Category:Defunct airports in Newfoundland and Labrador
- Category:Defunct ice hockey leagues in Newfoundland and Labrador
- Category:Deputy premiers of Newfoundland and Labrador
- Category:Designated places in Newfoundland and Labrador
- Category:Disasters in Newfoundland and Labrador
- Category:Disease-related deaths in Newfoundland and Labrador
- Category:Economy of Newfoundland and Labrador
- Category:Education in Newfoundland and Labrador
- Category:Elections in Newfoundland and Labrador
- Category:Elementary schools in Newfoundland and Labrador
- Category:Energy in Newfoundland and Labrador
- Category:Ethnic groups in Newfoundland and Labrador
- Category:Executive Council of Newfoundland and Labrador
- Category:Ferries of Newfoundland and Labrador
- Category:Ferry companies of Newfoundland and Labrador
- Category:Ferry transport in Newfoundland and Labrador
- Category:Festivals in Newfoundland and Labrador
- Category:Films set in Newfoundland and Labrador
- Category:Films shot in Newfoundland and Labrador
- Category:Flora of Newfoundland
- Category:Forts in Newfoundland and Labrador
- Category:Geography of Newfoundland and Labrador
- Category:Geology of Newfoundland and Labrador
- Category:Ghost towns in Newfoundland and Labrador
- Category:Golf clubs and courses in Newfoundland and Labrador
- Category:Government of Newfoundland and Labrador
- Category:Health in Newfoundland and Labrador
- Category:Health regions of Newfoundland and Labrador
- Category:Heritage sites in Newfoundland and Labrador
- Category:High schools in Newfoundland and Labrador
- Category:Hiking trails in Newfoundland and Labrador
- Category:History of Newfoundland and Labrador
- Category:History of Newfoundland and Labrador by location
- Category:Hospitals in Newfoundland and Labrador
- Category:Hotels in Newfoundland and Labrador
- Category:Houses in Newfoundland and Labrador
- Category:Hydroelectric power stations in Newfoundland and Labrador
- Category:Ice hockey in Newfoundland and Labrador
- Category:Ice hockey leagues in Newfoundland and Labrador
- Category:Ice hockey teams in Newfoundland and Labrador
- Category:Infectious disease deaths in Newfoundland and Labrador
- Category:International Baccalaureate schools in Newfoundland and Labrador
- Category:Islands of Newfoundland and Labrador
- Category:Jews and Judaism in Newfoundland and Labrador
- Category:Judges in Newfoundland and Labrador
- Category:Lakes of Newfoundland and Labrador
- Category:Landforms of Newfoundland and Labrador
- Category:Law enforcement agencies of Newfoundland and Labrador
- Category:Lawyers in Newfoundland and Labrador
- Category:Leaders of the Progressive Conservative Party of Newfoundland and Labrador
- Category:Lieutenant governors of Newfoundland and Labrador
- Category:Lighthouses in Newfoundland and Labrador
- Category:Lists of historic places in Newfoundland and Labrador
- Category:Lists of mayors of places in Newfoundland and Labrador
- Category:Local government in Newfoundland and Labrador
- Category:Magazines published in Newfoundland and Labrador
- Category:Maps of Newfoundland and Labrador provincial electoral districts
- Category:Maritime museums in Newfoundland and Labrador
- Category:Mayors of places in Newfoundland and Labrador
- Category:Mass media in Newfoundland and Labrador by city
- Category:Mass media in Newfoundland and Labrador
- Category:Members of the Executive Council of Newfoundland and Labrador
- Category:Members of the Order of Newfoundland and Labrador
- Category:Metropolitan areas of Newfoundland and Labrador
- Category:Middle schools in Newfoundland and Labrador
- Category:Military forts in Newfoundland and Labrador
- Category:Mines in Newfoundland and Labrador
- Category:Mining communities in Newfoundland and Labrador
- Category:Mining in Newfoundland and Labrador
- Category:Ministers of finance of Newfoundland and Labrador
- Category:Monuments and memorials in Newfoundland and Labrador
- Category:Mosques in Newfoundland and Labrador
- Category:Mountain ranges of Newfoundland and Labrador
- Category:Mountains of Newfoundland and Labrador
- Category:Municipal councils in Newfoundland and Labrador
- Category:Municipal elections in Newfoundland and Labrador
- Category:Museums in Newfoundland and Labrador
- Category:Music festivals in Newfoundland and Labrador
- Category:Narrow-gauge railways in Newfoundland and Labrador
- Category:National Historic Sites in Newfoundland and Labrador
- Category:Natural disasters in Newfoundland and Labrador
- Category:Natural history of Newfoundland and Labrador
- Category:Neighbourhoods in Newfoundland and Labrador
- Category:Newspapers published in Newfoundland and Labrador
- Category:Novels set in Newfoundland and Labrador
- Category:Oil-fired power stations in Newfoundland and Labrador
- Category:Organizations based in Newfoundland and Labrador
- Category:Parks in Newfoundland and Labrador
- Category:Passenger rail transport in Newfoundland and Labrador
- Category:Passenger railways in Newfoundland and Labrador
- Category:Peninsulas of Newfoundland and Labrador
- Category:People from Newfoundland and Labrador by populated place
- Category:People murdered in Newfoundland and Labrador
- Category:Political history of Newfoundland and Labrador
- Category:Politicians in Newfoundland and Labrador
- Category:Politics of Newfoundland and Labrador
- Category:Populated places in Newfoundland and Labrador
- Category:Power stations in Newfoundland and Labrador
- Category:Premiers of Newfoundland and Labrador
- Category:Private schools in Newfoundland and Labrador
- Category:Progressive Conservative Party of Newfoundland and Labrador
- Category:Progressive Conservative Party of Newfoundland and Labrador politicians
- Category:Protected areas of Newfoundland and Labrador
- Category:Provincial political parties in Newfoundland and Labrador
- Category:Provincial symbols of Newfoundland and Labrador
- Category:Public transport in Newfoundland and Labrador
- Category:Radio stations in Newfoundland and Labrador
- Category:Rail trails in Newfoundland and Labrador
- Category:Rail transport in Newfoundland and Labrador
- Category:Railway museums in Newfoundland and Labrador
- Category:Referendums in Newfoundland and Labrador
- Category:Religion in Newfoundland and Labrador
- Category:Religious buildings and structures in Newfoundland and Labrador
- Category:Restaurants in Newfoundland and Labrador
- Category:Rivers of Newfoundland and Labrador
- Category:Roads in Newfoundland and Labrador
- Category:Catholic Church in Newfoundland and Labrador
- Category:Roman Catholic church buildings in Newfoundland and Labrador
- Category:Catholic schools in Newfoundland and Labrador
- Category:School districts in Newfoundland and Labrador
- Category:Schools in Newfoundland and Labrador
- Category:Ships built in Newfoundland and Labrador
- Category:Shopping malls in Newfoundland and Labrador
- Category:Soccer clubs in Newfoundland and Labrador
- Category:Soccer in Newfoundland and Labrador
- Category:Sports in Newfoundland and Labrador
- Category:Sports in Newfoundland and Labrador by city
- Category:Sports governing bodies in Newfoundland and Labrador
- Category:Sports teams in Newfoundland and Labrador
- Category:Sports venues in Newfoundland and Labrador
- Category:Sportspeople in Newfoundland and Labrador
- Category:Synagogues in Newfoundland and Labrador
- Category:Television shows set in Newfoundland and Labrador
- Category:Television shows shot in Newfoundland and Labrador
- Category:Television stations in Newfoundland and Labrador
- Category:Theatres in Newfoundland and Labrador
- Category:Tourism in Newfoundland and Labrador
- Category:Towns in Newfoundland and Labrador
- Category:Transit agencies in Newfoundland and Labrador
- Category:Transport in Newfoundland and Labrador
- Category:Transport museums in Newfoundland and Labrador
- Category:Uninhabited islands of Newfoundland and Labrador
- Category:Universities and colleges in Newfoundland and Labrador
- Category:Valleys of Newfoundland and Labrador
- Category:Tourist attractions in Newfoundland and Labrador
- Category:Volcanism of Newfoundland and Labrador
- Category:Volcanoes of Newfoundland and Labrador
- Category:Water transport in Newfoundland and Labrador
- Category:Waterfalls of Newfoundland and Labrador
- Category:Weekly newspapers published in Newfoundland and Labrador
- Category:Women in Newfoundland and Labrador
- Category:Women in Newfoundland and Labrador politics

== Largest cities ==
Largest cities or towns in Newfoundland and Labrador Statistics Canada
Rank	Name	Census division	Pop.
1	St. John's	1	108,860
2	Conception Bay South	1	26,199
3	Mount Pearl	1	22,957
4	Paradise	1	21,389
5	Corner Brook	5	19,806
6	Grand Falls-Windsor	6	14,171
7	Gander	6	11,688
8	Portugal Cove-St.Philip's	1	8,147
9	Happy Valley-Goose Bay	10	8,109
10	Torbay	1	7,899
