= Ogunyemi =

Ogunyemi is a Nigerian surname. Notable people with the surname include:

- Abiodun Ogunyemi, Nigerian Anglican bishop
- Bolu Ogunyemi (born 1986), Nigerian-born Canadian dermatologist
- Chikwenye Okonjo Ogunyemi (born 1939), Nigerian academic
- Wale Ogunyemi (1939–2001), Nigerian dramatist
