= Duodu =

Duodu may refer to:

- Duodu (Chinese: 奲都, 1057–1062), reign period of Emperor Yizong of Western Xia

== People ==
- Cameron Duodu, Ghanaian author
- Clinton Duodu, Ghanaian football player
- Eugenia Duodu, Canadian chemist
- Fred Osam-Duodu, Ghanaian football coach
