= NLMA =

NLMA may refer to:

- National Land Management Agency, a Taiwan government agency
- National Liberation Movement of Ahwaz, an Arab nationalist and separatist organisation in Iran
- National Live Music Awards, Australian music awards presented annually
- Newfoundland and Labrador Medical Association, a Canadian medical practitioners' advocacy organisation
