= Bolu Ogunyemi =

Nigerian-Canadian dermatologist (born 1986)

Bolu Ogunyemi FRCPC
- Born: Boluwaji Ogunyemi; 1986 (age 39–40); Nigeria
- Education: Memorial University of Newfoundland; University of British Columbia; University of Western Ontario; Rotman School of Management
- Occupation: dermatologist
- Title: President of the Canadian Medical Association (2026–2027)
- Predecessor: Margot Burnell

Boluwaji Ogunyemi FRCPC (born 1986) is a Nigerian-born Canadian dermatologist based in Newfoundland and Labrador. In 2024, he was elected president of the Canadian Medical Association and took office in 2026, making him the first black president of the association and among its youngest, serving at 39 years old.

== Early life and education ==
Boluwaji Ogunyemi has two siblings. In the late 1980s and at the age of 11, his family immigrated to Canada, where they settled in St. John's. His father became the first neurology and epileptology professor of Newfoundland at the Memorial University of Newfoundland while his mother ran one of the first stores for African hair care and accessories.

In 2013, he completed medical school in Memorial University and received his Royal College of Physicians and Surgeons of Canada FRCPC certification in dermatology at the University of British Columbia in 2018. He is also a Diplomat of the American Board of Dermatology. He had received a joint honours degree in sociology and medical sciences at the University of Western Ontario as well as completing the Leadership Program at Rotman School of Management in Toronto. In 2024, he completed a Fellowship in Health Services Improvement at the University of Alberta.

== Career ==
Since 2018, Ogunyemi had been practicing dermatology in a specialist clinic in St. John's and also runs a regular clinic in Labrador City. In 2020, Ogunyemi became the Assistant Dean of Social Accountability in the Faculty of Medicine at Memorial University for three years. He had also been the member of the Board of Directors of the Newfoundland and Labrador Medical Association for three years. He became a member of the Board of Directors of the Canadian Doctors for Medicare, the Resident Doctors of British Columbia, and the Canadian Dermatology Association. Furthermore, he also was a member of the Public Health Ethics Consultative Group in the Public Health Agency of Canada.

He served as a member of the Governance Committee of the Canadian Medical Association (CMA). In 2024, Ogunyemi was elected president-elect of the CMA, following a majority vote against Susan MacDonald. Nigerian president Bola Tinubu congratulated Ogunyemi on being elected, commending his qualifications at the job. On 29 May 2026, he officially assumed president of the association, following the completion of Margot Brunell's term, making him the first black person and among the youngest person to assume presidency at the association. Courtney Howard was installed as the next President-elect of the association, planning to replace him by 2027. He also said that he was the first Memorial University alumnus to be elected as such.

== Awards and recognitions ==
In 2017, Ogunyemi was awarded the Harry Jerome Award for Health Sciences.
