= Natasha Bacchus =

Canadian sprinter (born 1977)

Personal information
- Born: 10 December 1977 (age 48) Toronto, Ontario, Canada

Sport
- Country: Canada
- Sport: Women's Athletics
Medal record
Deaflympics
Gold medal – first place	Sofia 1993	100m
Gold medal – first place	Copenhagen 1997	100m
Gold medal – first place	Copenhagen 1997	200m
Silver medal – second place	Sofia 1993	200m

Natasha "Courage" Bacchus (born 1977) is a Canadian female Deaf track and field athlete. She has represented Canada at the Deaflympics in 1993, 1997, and in 2001.

Bacchus was born in Toronto on 10 December 1977, to a Guyanese mother. She also has a younger brother. She won 4 medals in her Deaflympic career which spanned from 1993 to 2001, including 3 gold medals. The British Columbia Deaf Sports Federation named her Outstanding Athlete of the Year for the 2014–2015 season.

After competing at the international level, Bacchus began working as a personal trainer.

Bacchus has also pursued a career in the performing arts. Her credits as an actor include Destiny, USA (2019), The Black Drum (2019) in the role of Squib, and The Two Natashas (2020). She has also performed in cabaret events including the 2019 ASL Deaf Drag Performance at Buddies in Bad Times Theatre in Toronto, Ontario.

Bacchus expressed public support for Black Lives Matter at a public rally in June 2020, elaborating on her experiences of racial discrimination as a Black Deaf woman. She supports increased communication access for the Deaf community in interactions with the police. In an interview on NBC News, she also stated that she prefers to be called "Courage" rather than Natasha.
