= List of population centres in Newfoundland and Labrador =

A population centre, in Canadian census data, is a populated place, or a cluster of interrelated populated places, which meets the demographic characteristics of an urban area, having a population of at least 1,000 people and a population density of no fewer than 400 persons per square km^{2}.

The term was introduced in the Canada 2011 Census; prior to that, Statistics Canada used the term urban area.

In the 2021 Census of Population, Statistics Canada listed 27 population centres in the province of Newfoundland and Labrador. This includes the new population centres of Sheshatshiu and Stephenville Crossing.

== List ==
The below table is a list of those population centres in Newfoundland and Labrador from the 2021 Census of Population as designated, named, and delineated by Statistics Canada.

Rank	Population centre	Size group	Population (2021)	Population (2016)	Change	Land area (km^{2})	Population density
1	St. John's	Large urban	185,565	181,955	+2.0%	178	1,042.5/km^{2}
2	Corner Brook	Small	19,129	19,546	−2.1%	21.6	885.6/km^{2}
3	Grand Falls-Windsor	Small	11,986	12,519	−4.3%	12.34	971.3/km^{2}
4	Gander	Small	9,918	10,220	−3.0%	13.64	727.1/km^{2}
5	Labrador City	Small	9,011	8,763	+2.8%	14.5	621.4/km^{2}
6	Stephenville	Small	7,344	7,271	+1.0%	15.48	474.4/km^{2}
7	Happy Valley-Goose Bay	Small	6,996	6,678	+4.8%	10.17	687.9/km^{2}
8	Bay Roberts	Small	6,897	6,896	0.0%	16.88	408.6/km^{2}
9	Carbonear	Small	6,235	6,613	−5.7%	11.16	558.7/km^{2}
10	Clarenville-Shoal Harbour	Small	6,143	5,828	+5.4%	12.46	493.0/km^{2}
11	Deer Lake	Small	4,346	4,632	−6.2%	8.2	530.0/km^{2}
12	Channel-Port aux Basques	Small	3,127	3,665	−14.7%	5.17	604.8/km^{2}
13	Bishop's Falls	Small	3,006	3,087	−2.6%	6.89	436.3/km^{2}
14	Bonavista	Small	2,979	3,140	−5.1%	4.36	683.3/km^{2}
15	Pasadena	Small	2,769	2,800	−1.1%	3.54	782.2/km^{2}
16	Botwood	Small	2,741	2,819	−2.8%	5.54	494.8/km^{2}
17	Marystown	Small	2,671	2,702	−1.1%	5.71	467.8/km^{2}
18	Springdale	Small	2,182	2,178	+0.2%	3.76	580.3/km^{2}
19	Grand Bank	Small	2,071	2,230	−7.1%	2.24	924.6/km^{2}
20	Lewisporte	Small	2,064	2,179	−5.3%	2.33	885.8/km^{2}
21	St. Anthony	Small	1,986	2,049	−3.1%	4.52	439.4/km^{2}
22	Massey Drive	Small	1,606	1,632	−1.6%	2.45	655.5/km^{2}
23	Placentia	Small	1,338	1,374	−2.6%	2.62	510.7/km^{2}
24	Burgeo	Small	1,176	1,307	−10.0%	2.08	565.4/km^{2}
25	Wabana	Small	1,091	1,325	−17.7%	2.53	431.2/km^{2}
26	Sheshatshiu	Small	1,049	1,272	−17.5%	1.61	651.6/km^{2}
27	Stephenville Crossing	Small	1,038	941	+10.3%	1.4	741.4/km^{2}

== Retired population centres ==
The former population centres of Humber Arm South, Fortune and Upper Island Cove were retired for the 2021 census.

== See also ==
- List of the largest population centres in Canada
