= List of television stations in Newfoundland and Labrador =

This is a list of broadcast television stations serving cities in the Canadian province of Newfoundland and Labrador.

City of licence	Analog channel	Digital channel	Virtual channel	Callsign	Network	Notes
Happy Valley-Goose Bay	12			CHTG-TV	APTN	relay of the Aboriginal Peoples Television Network
Hopedale	12			CH4153	APTN	relay of the Aboriginal Peoples Television Network
Makkovik	12			CH4151	APTN	relay of the Aboriginal Peoples Television Network
Nain	12			CH4154	APTN	relay of the Aboriginal Peoples Television Network
Postville	12			CH4152	APTN	relay of the Aboriginal Peoples Television Network
St. John's		21	21.1 CJON-DT; 21.2 CHOZ-FM	CJON-DT	NTV	
St. John's		8	8.1	CBNT-DT	CBC	

== See also ==
- List of television stations in Canada
- Lists of television stations in Atlantic Canada
- Media in Canada
