= List of Newfoundland and Labrador communities by population =

This page lists the incorporated cities and towns of the province of Newfoundland and Labrador, Canada by population.

== Cities ==
The following is a list of the incorporated cities in Newfoundland and Labrador by population as of the Canada 2011 Census.

Name	Population 2011	Population 2006	Area(km^{2})
St. John's	106,172	100,646	446.06
Mount Pearl	24,284	24,671	15.75
Corner Brook	19,886	20,083	148.26

== Towns ==
The following is a list of the incorporated towns in Newfoundland and Labrador as of the Canada 2011 Census by population.

Name	Population in 2011	Population in 2006	Area in 2011 (km^{2})
Conception Bay South	24,848	21,966	59.27
Paradise	17,695	12,584	29.24
Grand Falls-Windsor	13,725	13,558	54.67
Gander	11,054	9,951	104.25
Happy Valley-Goose Bay	7,552	7,572	305.85
Torbay	7,397	6,281	34.88
Labrador City	7,367	7,240	38.83
Portugal Cove-St. Philip's	7,366	6,575	57.35
Stephenville	6,719	6,588	35.68
Clarenville	6,036	5,274	140.79
Bay Roberts	5,818	5,414	23.92
Marystown	5,506	5,436	61.97
Deer Lake	4,995	4,827	73.23
Carbonear	4,739	4,723	11.81
Channel-Port aux Basques	4,170	4,319	38.77
Placentia	3,643	3,898	58.05
Bonavista	3,589	3,764	31.5
Lewisporte	3,483	3,308	36.91
Pasadena	3,352	3,180	49.16
Bishop's Falls	3,341	3,399	28.12
Harbour Grace	3,131	3,074	33.71
Botwood	3,008	3,052	15.05
Springdale	2,907	2,764	17.6
Spaniard's Bay	2,622	2,540	65.73
Burin	2,424	2,483	34.05
St. Anthony	2,418	2,476	37.02
Grand Bank	2,415	2,580	16.97
Wabana	2,346	2,418	14.5
Twillingate	2,269	2,448	25.74
New-Wes-Valley	2,265	2,485	133.59
Glovertown	2,122	2,062	70.33
Logy Bay-Middle Cove-Outer Cove	2,098	1,978	16.98
Holyrood	1,995	2,005	125.57
Gambo	1,984	2,072	92.07
Stephenville Crossing	1,875	1,960	31.2
Pouch Cove	1,866	1,756	58.34
Wabush	1,861	1,739	46.25
Trinity Bay North	1,827	1,997	25.43
Kippens	1,815	1,739	14.32
Victoria	1,764	1,769	17.64
Harbour Breton	1,711	1,877	13.74
Humber Arm South	1,681	1,854	65.06
Upper Island Cove	1,594	1,667	7.85
Burgeo	1,464	1,607	31.34
Flatrock	1,457	1,214	18.12
Fortune	1,442	1,458	54.85
Irishtown-Summerside	1,428	1,290	11.89
Massey Drive	1,412	1,170	2.48
Clarke's Beach	1,396	1,289	12.71
Baie Verte	1,370	1,275	371.09
Bay Bulls	1,283	1,078	30.74
St. Lawrence	1,244	1,349	35.5
St. Alban's	1,233	1,278	20.85
St. George's	1,207	1,246	25.83
Nain	1,188	1,034	94.58
Witless Bay	1,179	1,070	17.49
Centreville-Wareham-Trinity	1,161	1,122	37.25
Harbour Main-Chapel's Cove-Lakeview	1,083	1,090	21.05
Triton	983(2016)	998	7.55
Musgravetown	556	583	13.63
