= Vehicle registration plates of Newfoundland and Labrador =

Newfoundland and Labrador
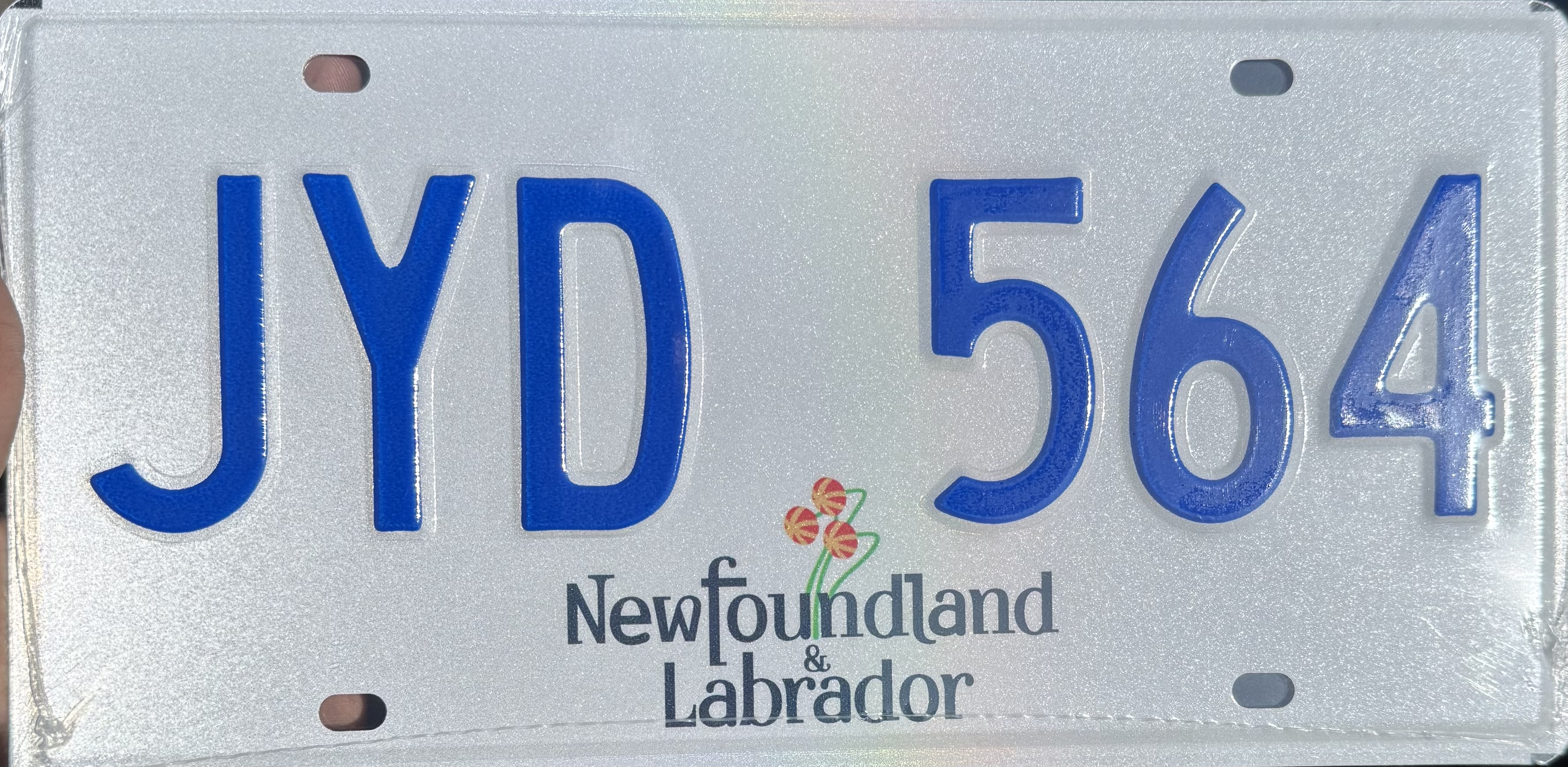

Current series
- Size: 12 in × 6 in 30 cm × 15 cm
- Serial format: ABC 123
- Introduced: November 2025

Availability
- Issued by: Digital Government and Service NL, Motor Registration Division
- Manufactured by: Waldale Manufacturing Limited, Amherst, Nova Scotia

History
- First issued: 1925

Newfoundland and Labrador first required its residents to register their motor vehicles and display licence plates in 1920, while still a British dominion. It became a province of Canada in 1949.

In 1956, Canada, the United States, and Mexico came to an agreement with the American Association of Motor Vehicle Administrators, the Automobile Manufacturers Association and the National Safety Council that standardized the size for licence plates for vehicles (except those for motorcycles) at 6 inches (15 cm) in height by 12 inches (30 cm) in width, with standardized mounting holes. The 1956 (dated 1957) issue was the first Newfoundland licence plate that fully complied with these standards: the issues from 1951 (dated 1952) through 1955 (dated 1956) were all 6 inches in height by 12 inches in width, but had non-standard mounting holes.

The last complete re-registration of all registered vehicles in Newfoundland and Labrador was in 1981, with a switch from a numerical system to an alphanumeric system.

All plates issued since 1982 (beginning AAA-001) remain valid today. Plates remain with the vehicle to which they are originally registered, rather than with the owner. Used vehicles with expired plates are issued new licence plates, while used vehicles with valid plates retain their original licence plate.

Since 1985, the province has not used the letters I, Q, U or Y on licence plates, except on plates that use "VO1" (or "VO2" for Labrador) followed by two or three letters issued to Amateur radio operators. However, the HAY series was issued on the 1996-97 Cabot 500 base, while the TFI series was issued on trailers in 2010. The letter I is skipped because it closely resembles the number 1, while the letter Q is skipped because it closely resembles the letter O (which the province does use) and the number zero.

Since September 1997, the province requires only a rear plate for most registrations, except for B, C, E and G plates (see below). Some older cars still display both front and rear plates. Some early "World of Difference" and Cabot 500 base plates were issued in duplicate for the front and rear.

In 2019 the province announced it would be designing licence plates for electric "green" vehicles.

On Newfoundland licence plates, the first letter (or two letters) designates the registration class of the vehicle. For example, HMT-999 would be assigned to a passenger car, while TZD-019 would be assigned to a trailer.

Newfoundland and Labrador is the only province in Canada that does not allow vanity licence plates to be registered.

== Vehicle class ==
First letter(s)	Vehicle type	Notes on use/expiration/issue	Current/last issue
A	Private car	Began at AAA-001 in 1982; ended at AZZ-999 on World of Difference base in 1998. Front and rear plates required until 1997.	AZZ-999
AA	Antique Auto	Issued to cars and trucks eligible to be considered antique. Cars must be at least 25 years old to be considered. ‘Antique Auto’ is screened onto the plate on the left of the serial	4433
B	Bus	BAx for public-use buses, BPx for private-use buses (e.g. tour buses). Front and rear plates required.	BAJ-976 BPD-893
C	Truck/heavy vehicle	Issued to pickup trucks, SUVs and large vans. Began at CAA-001 in 1982; reached CZZ-999 on pitcher plant base in 2017, followed by CA0 001 onwards. Front and rear plates required. CRx indicates large mobile crane units that are generally overwidth and need special permits and escort on public roadways. Some trucks and vans may now be registered as private cars.	CL7-999
D	Dealer	Issued to auto dealers for test driving and transporting cars.	DAW-768
E	Emergency vehicle	Emergency vehicles (fire trucks or police cars) are registered as provincial or municipal, as private ambulance companies operate in NL. Front and rear plates required. Also used by search and rescue vehicles.	EAD-692
F	Farm vehicle	FAx for farm tractors, FEx for farm equipment, FTx for farm trucks that operate on roads. Infrequently issued.	FAD-638 FEC-654 FTD-273
FF	Fire Fighter	Issued to cars and trucks belonging to firefighters. Have the FD crest on the left of the serial.	6163FF
G	Government vehicle	GMx on municipal vehicles, GPx on provincial, GFx on federal. Front and rear plates required.	GMO-320 GPR-292 GFM-154
H	Private car	Issued as next available letter after 'A' series. Began at HAB-001 on Cabot base in fall of 1996; issued on World of Difference base from 1998; ended at HZZ-999 on pitcher plant base in summer of 2013.	HZZ-999
J	Private car	Issued as next available letter after 'H' series. Began at JAA-001 on pitcher plant base in summer of 2013.	JUH-002
K	Trail Bike / Private Car	Used primarily on dual purpose motorcycles for on and off road use. Same size and base as current Motorcycle plate. Passenger vehicles will also be issued plates starting with K once J plates run out	KAP-048
M	Motorcycle	Began at MCA-001 in 1982.	MEO-723
PR	Apportioned	Issued to transport trucks. Began at PRP-001 in 1982; reached PRZ-999 on pitcher plant base in 2012, followed by PRA-001 onwards.	PRC-228
S	Snowmobile	Began at SAA-001. These are decals and older ones can also be 12345 format. Used to all be orange text on white but the current decal is black text on white.	SMN-942
T	Trailer	Began at TAA-001 in 1982; jumped from TET-999 to TVT-001 when flag base was introduced in 2001; reached TZZ-999 then jumped back to TEV-001 on pitcher plant base in 2008. TXx reserved for taxi plates.	TMJ-999
TX	Licensed taxi	Supplemented with a municipal taxi licence sticker.	TXP-999
W	Tow truck	Tow trucks display a second plate (in addition to a 'C' series plate). Infrequently issued.	WAE-592
X	Heavy machinery	Issued to tractors, backhoes, forklifts, etc.	XAX-203
V (VBC-123)	Off-Road	Issued to quads and UTVs,	VJO-091
VO1, VO2	Amateur Radio	Issued to Newfoundland (VO1) and Laborador (VO2) Amateur Operators. These plates are issued to match an individual's assigned callsign. Unlike other plates these are not issued sequentially, as callsigns are selected by choice. Plates may vary between 5 and 6 characters, as operators may conditionally be issued a shorter callsign	N/A (VO1?? - VO2???)
V (V1234)	Veteran	Issued to cars and trucks belonging to military veterans	V3223
VA (VA123)	Veteran Motorcycle	Issued to motorcycles belonging to military veterans	VA644

== Passenger baseplates ==
=== 1925 to 1969 ===
Image	Dates issued	Design	Slogan	Serial format	Serials issued	Notes
	1925	Embossed white serial on red plate with border line; vertical "NFLD" and "1925" at left and right respectively	none	1234	1001 to approximately 2100	
	1926	Embossed black serial on cream plate with border line; vertical "NFLD" and "1926" at left and right respectively	none	1234	1001 to approximately 2000	
	1927	Embossed white serial on forest green plate with border line; "NFLD 1927" at bottom	none	1234	1001 to approximately 2500	
	1928	Embossed black serial on white plate with border line; "NFLD 1928" at bottom	none	1234	1001 to approximately 2700	
	1929	Embossed white serial on ocean blue plate with border line; "NFLD 1929" at bottom	none	1234	1001 to approximately 3200	
	1930	Embossed white serial on red plate with border line; "NEWFOUNDLAND-30" at bottom	none	1234	1001 to approximately 3500	
	1931	Embossed white serial on green plate with border line; "NEWFOUNDLAND-31" at bottom	none	1234	1001 to approximately 3600	
	1932	Embossed white serial on dark blue plate with border line; "NEWFOUNDLAND-32" at bottom	none	1234	1001 to approximately 3300	
	1933	Embossed white serial on red plate with border line; "NEWFOUNDLAND-33" at bottom	none	1234	1001 to approximately 2800	
	1934	Embossed orange serial on black plate with border line; "NEWFOUNDLAND-34" at bottom	none	1234	1001 to approximately 3600	
	1935	Embossed silver serial on black plate with border line; "NEWFOUNDLAND-35" at top	none	1234	1001 to approximately 3900	
	1936	Embossed blue serial on white plate with border line; "NEWFOUNDLAND-36" at bottom	none	1234	1001 to approximately 4200	
	1937	Embossed red serial on white plate with border line; embossed crown graphic at left; "NEWFOUNDLAND-37" at top	none	1234	1001 to approximately 4800	
	1938	Embossed white serial on black plate with border line; "NEWFOUNDLAND-38" at bottom	none	1-234	1-001 to approximately 5-100	
	1939	Embossed dark green serial on white plate with border line; "NEWFOUNDLAND-39" at top	none	1-234	1-001 to approximately 4-900	
	1940	Embossed orange serial on black plate with border line; "NEWFOUNDLAND-40" at bottom	none	1-234	1-001 to approximately 5-400	
	1941	Embossed white serial on red plate with border line; "NEWFOUNDLAND-41" at top	none	1-234	1-001 to approximately 5-000	
	1942	Embossed orange serial on black plate with border line; "NEWFOUNDLAND-42" at bottom	none	1-234	1-001 to approximately 6-500	Reused in 1944 due to metal conservation for World War II.
	1943	Embossed white serial on black plate with border line; "NEWFOUNDLAND-43" at top	none	1-234	1-001 to approximately 6-100	C-001 ... used for Commercial vehicles
	1944	As 1942 base, but red on black	none	1-234	1-001 to approximately 5-700	Repainted and reused 1942 plates.
	1945	Hand-painted white serial on dark green flat metal plate; "NEWFOUNDLAND-45" at top	none	1-234	1-001 to approximately 4-700	
	1946	Embossed white serial on red plate with border line; "NEWFOUNDLAND-46" at bottom	none	1-234	1-001 to approximately 6-400	
	1947	Embossed white serial on green plate with border line; "NEWFOUNDLAND-47" at top	none	1-234	1-001 to approximately 7-200	
	1948	Embossed white serial on black plate with border line; "NEWFOUNDLAND-48" at bottom	none	1-234	1-001 to approximately 8-000	
	1949	Embossed white serial on red plate with border line; "NEWFOUNDLAND-49" at top	none	1-234	1-001 to approximately 9-000	Joined Canada
	1950	Embossed black serial on orange plate with border line; "NEWFOUNDLAND-50" at top	none	12-345	1-001 to approximately 11-500	
	1951	Embossed white serial on blue plate with border line; "NEWFOUNDLAND 51" at bottom	none	12-345	10-001 to approximately 23-500	
	1952	Embossed white serial on green plate with border line; "NEWFOUNDLAND-52" at bottom	none	12-345	1-001 to approximately 19-000	
	1953	Embossed white serial on maroon plate with border line; "NEWFOUNDLAND-53" at top	none	12-345	1-001 to approximately 21-000	
	1954	Embossed white serial on dark green plate with border line; "NEWFOUNDLAND-54" at top	none	12-345	1-001 to approximately 26-500	
	1955	Embossed white serial on black plate with border line; "NEWFOUNDLAND-55" at bottom	none	12-345	1-001 to approximately 28-000	
	1956	Embossed white serial on maroon plate with border line; "NEWFOUNDLAND-56" at top	none	12-345	1-001 to approximately 36-000	
	1957	Embossed yellow serial on sky blue plate with border line; "NEWFOUNDLAND-57" at bottom	none	12-345	1-001 to approximately 38-000	
	1958	Embossed black serial on yellow plate with border line; "NEWFOUNDLAND-58" at top	none	12-345	1-001 to approximately 39-000	
	1959	Embossed yellow serial on black plate with border line; "NEWFOUNDLAND-59" at bottom	none	12-345	1-001 to approximately 43-000	
	1960	Embossed white serial on red plate with border line; "NEWFOUNDLAND-60" at top	none	12-345	1-001 to approximately 45-000	
	1961	Embossed black serial on white plate with border line; "NEWFOUNDLAND-61" at bottom	none	12-345	1-001 to approximately 49-000	
	1962	Embossed white serial on black plate with border line; "NEWFOUNDLAND-62" at top	none	12-345	1-001 to approximately 55-000	
	1963	Embossed black serial on yellow plate with border line; "NEWFOUNDLAND-63" at bottom	none	12-345	1-001 to approximately 59-000	
	1964	Embossed white serial on dark blue plate with border line; "NEWFOUNDLAND-64" at top	none	12-345	1-001 to approximately 65-000	
	1965	Embossed dark blue serial on white plate with border line; "NEWFOUNDLAND AND" and "LABRADOR" centred and top and bottom respectively; "19" at top left and "65" at top right	none	12-345	1-001 to approximately 70-000	
	1966	Embossed dark blue serial on orange plate with border line; "NEWFOUNDLAND AND LABRADOR" and "1966" centred at top and bottom respectively	none	12-345	1-001 to approximately 74-000	
	1967	Embossed green serial on white plate with border line; "NEWFOUNDLAND AND LABRADOR" and "1967" centred at top and bottom respectively	"CANADA CENTENNIAL" between serial and year	12-345	1-001 to approximately 79-000	
	1968	Embossed red serial on white plate with border line; "NEWFOUNDLAND AND LABRADOR" at top; "19" at bottom left and "68" at bottom right	"CANADA'S HAPPY PROVINCE" centred at bottom	12-345	1-001 to approximately 87-000	
	1969	Embossed blue serial on white plate with border line; "NEWFOUNDLAND AND LABRADOR" and "1969" centred at top and bottom respectively; embossed blue lightning bolts either side of year	"THE MIGHTY CHURCHILL" between serial and year	12-345	1-001 to approximately 88-000	

=== 1970 to present ===
Image	Dates issued	Design	Slogan	Serial format	Serials issued	Notes
	1970–72	Embossed green serial on white plate with border line; "NEWFOUNDLAND AND LABRADOR" and "1970" centred at top and bottom respectively	none	123-456	1-001 to approximately 136-000	
	1973–75	Embossed red serial on white plate; border lines around plate and around bottom corners; "NEWFOUNDLAND AND LABRADOR" and "1973" centred at top and bottom respectively	none	123-456	1-001 to approximately 165-000	
	1976–82	Embossed blue serial on orange plate; border lines around plate and around bottom corners; "NEWFOUNDLAND AND LABRADOR" and "1976" centred at top and bottom respectively	none	123-456	1-001 to approximately 259-000	
	1982 – mid 1993	Embossed blue serial on white plate; "NEWFOUNDLAND" and "AND LABRADOR" in red centred at top and bottom respectively	none	ABC-123	AAA-001 to ASZ-999	
	mid 1993 – September 1996	Embossed red serial on white plate; graphic screened at bottom featuring a Viking ship with a red sail against a yellow sunset; "Newfoundland & Labrador" screened in red at top	"A WORLD OF DIFFERENCE" screened in red below and to right of graphic	ABC 123	ATA 001 to AZF 999	
	September 1996 – September 1997	Embossed red serial on light blue and white gradient plate; screened red graphic of John Cabot centred at bottom; "Newfoundland & Labrador" screened in blue at top	"CABOT" screened in blue to right of graphic, and "Celebrate 500 Years" in black to left	ABC 123	HAB 001 to HBC 999	Commemorated the 500th anniversary of Cabot's voyage to Newfoundland.
	September 1997 – October 2001	As 1993–96 base	"A WORLD OF DIFFERENCE" as from 1993 to 1996	ABC 123	AZG 001 to AZZ 999; HBD 001 to HEP 999	
	October 2001 – July; 2002	Embossed red serial on white plate; screened provincial flag centred slightly below serial; "NEWFOUNDLAND & LABRADOR CANADA" screened in red below flag	none	ABC 123	HER 001 to HFO 999	
	July; 2002 – September 2003	As above, but with "NEWFOUNDLAND & LABRADOR" centred at top, and "CANADA" increased in size	none	ABC 123	HFP 001 to HGZ 999	
	September 2003 – April; 2007	As above, but with flag graphic revised and increased in size, "Newfoundland & Labrador" at top, and "CANADA" removed	none	ABC 123	HHA 001 to HMT 999	
	April 2007 – December 2021 January 2023 – November 2025	Embossed blue serial on white plate; screened provincial wordmark centred at bottom, consisting of a pitcher plant with "Newfoundland" and "Labrador" in blue below	none	ABC 123	HMV 001 to JPZ 999; JTD 001 to JWY 999	
	January 2022 – December 2022	Embossed blue serial on white and teal gradient plate; screened blue graphic of a whale; screened red provincial word mark on top; screened red “COME HOME 2022” on bottom	"COME HOME 2022" screened in red bottom centre	ABC 123	JRA 001 to JTC 999	Commemorated the 2022 Newfoundland and Labrador Come Home Year.
	January 2024 – December 2024	Embossed black serial on white plate; screened blue and gray graphics of sections of the NL flag; screened red half maple leaf; screened blue “1949 - 2024” on bottom separated by a gold dash; screened provincial wordmark with pitcher plant on top; screened 75 middle	"1949 - 2024 75" screened in bottom & centre	ABC 123	JUH 001 to JVV 999	Commemorated the 75th anniversary of Newfoundland and Labrador joining Canadian confederation.
	November 2025 – present	Same as original pitcher plant base, with black province name on bottom.	none	ABC 123	JWZ 001 to JXP 001 (As of April 27, 2026)	

=== Green vehicle plates ===
Image	Dates issued	Design	Slogan	Serial format	Notes
A prototype of a new electric vehicle licence plate for Newfoundland and Labrador.	TBD	Embossed green serial on white plate with; "NEWFOUNDLAND AND LABRADOR" logo centred at bottom.	none	ABC 123	In November 2019, the Newfoundland and Labrador government announced a prototype design for a Green vehicle licence plate. Premier Dwight Ball made the announcement at the Drive Electric NL Electric Vehicle Showcase. As of 2023, this plate design has not yet been made available; electric vehicles simply use plates from the main series.

== Commercial baseplates ==
Image	Type	Dates issued	Design	Serial format	Serials issued	Notes
	Commercial	1982–95	As 1982 passenger base	CBC-123	CAA-001 to CHV-999	
	Commercial	1995–96	As World of Difference passenger base	CBC 123	CHW 001 to CJH 999	
	Commercial	1996–97	As Cabot passenger base	CBC 123	CKL 001 to CKR 999	
	Commercial	1997– 2003	As World of Difference passenger base	CBC 123	CJJ 001 to CKK 999; CKS 001 to CMS 999	
	Commercial	2003–04	As 2001 flag passenger base	CBC 123	CMT 001 to CNE 999	
	Commercial	2004–07	As 2003 flag passenger base	CBC 123	CNF 001 to COS 999	
	Commercial	2007–17	As pitcher plant passenger base	CBC 123	COT 001 to CZZ 999	Series CRA through CRZ reserved for mobile crane units.
	Commercial	2017–2025	As pitcher plant passenger base	CB1 234	CA0 001 to approximately CN7 999	Series CRA through CRZ reserved for mobile crane units.
	Commercial	2025–present	As black pitcher plant passenger base	CB1 234	approximately CN8 000 to CP4 271 (as of April 30, 2026)	
	PRP		As pitcher plant passenger base	PRA 123		
	Bus	1997-2001	As World of Difference passenger base	BAB 123		
	Bus	2007–present	As pitcher plant passenger base	BAB 123		
	Private Bus	1997-2001	As World of Difference passenger base	BPA 123		
	Private Bus	2007–present	As pitcher plant passenger base	BPA 123		
	Farm Truck		As pitcher plant passenger base	FTA 123		
	Farm Equipment		As pitcher plant passenger base	FEA 123		

== Non-passenger plates ==
Image	Type	Dates issued	Design	Serial format	Serials issued	Notes
	Antique		As pitcher plant passenger base; "ANTIQUE AUTO" on left side	1234		
	ATV			ABC 123		
	Motorcycle	1954	Dark green with white numerals	123		
	Motorcycle	1955	Black with white numerals	123		
	Motorcycle	1968	White with red numerals	123		
	Motorcycle	1982– 2004	Similar design to 1982 passenger base; debossed sticker box at bottom left	M/C A-123	M/C A-001 to M/C X-999	
	Motorcycle	2004–07	Embossed red serial on white plate; border lines around plate and around sticker box at bottom left; "NEWFOUNDLAND" at top; "& LABRADOR" at bottom right	MBC-123	MDA-001 to MDE-999	
	Motorcycle	2007– present	Similar design to pitcher plant passenger base; debossed sticker box at bottom left	MBC-123	MDF-001 to MEK-031 (as of June 28, 2019)	
	Snow vehicle			ABC 123		
	Trailer	1982–94	As 1982 passenger base	TBC-123	TAA-001 to TDE-999	
	Trailer	1994–96	As World of Difference passenger base	TBC 123	TDF 001 to TDR 999	
	Trailer	1996–97	As Cabot passenger base	TBC 123	TDS 001 to TDX 999	
	Trailer	1997–2001	As World of Difference passenger base	TBC 123	TDZ 001 to TET 999	
	Trailer	2001–02	As 2001 flag passenger base	TBC 123	TVT 001 to TVV 999	
	Trailer	2002–03	As 2002 flag passenger base	TBC 123	TVW 001 to TWE 999	
	Trailer	2003–07	As 2003 flag passenger base	TBC 123	TWF 001 to TWZ 999; TZA 001 to TZC 999	
	Trailer	2007–2025	As pitcher plant passenger base	TBC 123	TZD 001 to TZZ 999; TEV 001 to approximately TMO 999	
	Trailer	2025–present	As black pitcher plant passenger base	TBC 123	approximately TMP 001 to TMS 455 (as of April 30, 2026)	
	Emergency Vehicle	1997–2001	As World of Difference passenger base	EAB 123		
	Emergency Vehicle	2007–present	As pitcher plant passenger base	EAB 123		

=== Government plates ===
Image	Type	Dates issued	Design	Serial format	Serials issued	Notes
	Federal government		As pitcher plant passenger base	GFA 123		
	Provincial government		As pitcher plant passenger base	GPA 123		
	Municipal government		As pitcher plant passenger base	GMA 123		

== Specialty plates ==
Image	Type	Dates issued	Design	Serial format	Serials issued	Notes
	Veteran		As pitcher plant passenger base; "VETERAN" at top, poppy on left.	V1234		
	Veteran Motorcycle		As pitcher plant passenger base; "VETERAN" at top, poppy on left.	VA123		
