= Tamar Huggins =

Canadian tech entrepreneur, author and educator

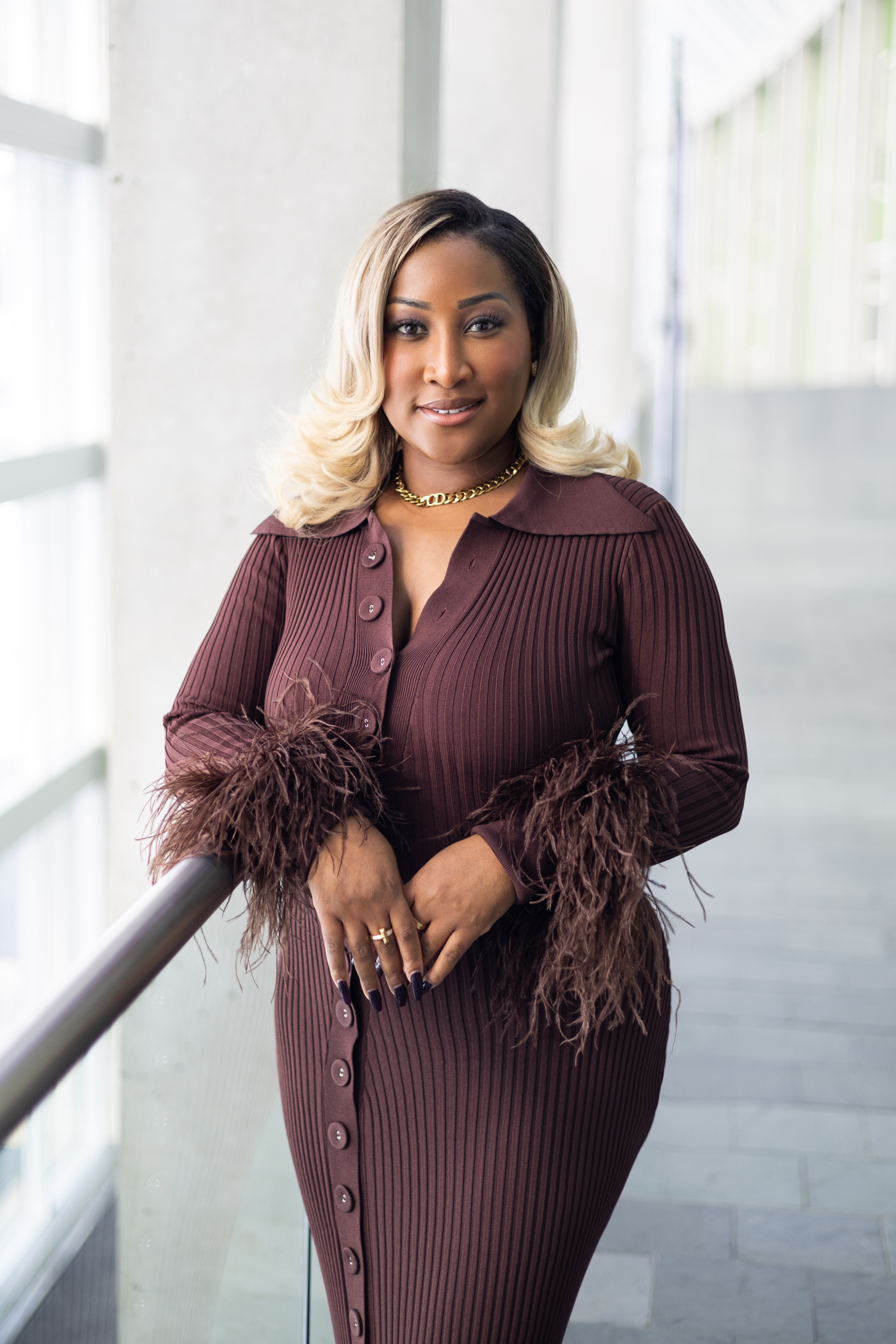
- Tamar Huggins in 2025
- Born: Canada
- Years active: 2009–present
- Website: tamarhuggins.com

Tamar Huggins is a Canadian tech entrepreneur, author and teacher. She is an advocate for diversity, equity, and inclusion in tech education, whose work focuses on the development of the Black tech ecosystem in Canada. Huggins founded DRIVEN Accelerator Group, a tech accelerator for underrepresented founders in Canada. She also founded Tech Spark, a Canadian technology school for Black youth, girls and other youth of colour, and created Spark Plug AI.

== Education ==
Huggins graduated in 2007 from Centennial College, where she studied creative advertising with a major in media planning.

== Career ==
Huggins pursued entrepreneurship in 2009 after losing her advertising job during the recession. In 2012, she created the first tech accelerator for BIPOC leaders in Canada, called DRIVEN. The accelerator raised $1.1 million for Black, Brown and women-led tech startups in Canada. In 2015, Huggins launched a technology school in Canada focused on BIPOC students, called Tech Spark. The school educated 1500 students in the first two years. In 2017, Huggins released her first book, Bossed Up: 100 Truths to Becoming Your Own Boss, God's Way! In November 2019, Huggins founded EDUlytics, later rebranded as Spark Plug, a digital tool that uses data, hip hop culture and artificial intelligence to personalize education and inform education policy.

In 2021, Huggins' technology company was awarded $1 million from TD Canada Trust, to scale Spark Plug to 40,000 North American students.

== Honours and awards ==
- Harry Jerome Awards, Young Entrepreneur, 2015
- Canadian Living Magazine, Canadian Superhero, 2015
- CIBWE, 100 Black Women to Watch, 2015
- Canada's Top 150 Black Women Creating Impact Across the Country, CBC and Herstory in Black, 2017
- Move The Dial, Dial Mover, 2019
- The City of Brampton, Innovation Award, 2020
- TD Canada Trust, TD Ready Challenge Winner, 2021
- Centennial College, Alumnus of Distinction, 2021
- Womxn in Data Science Toronto, Trailblazer Award, 2022

ye
