= Paul Winn =

Paul Angelo Winn is a Canadian human rights activist, and a former lawyer.

He served as a director and interim Chief of the Canadian Race Relations Foundation, a Canadian crown corporation with a goal of building a national framework for the fight against racism in Canadian society. Mr Winn is also past president of the Black Historical and Cultural Society of British Columbia.

In the 1980s, Mr. Winn wrote and hosted a weekly CBC Television program entitled The Canadians, which surveyed the multicultural communities of Canadian society. He was the first visible minority host of a national television program in Canada.

Mr. Winn was active in the Anti-discrimination directorate of the Canadian government in the 1980s and 1990s, before pursuing a law degree at the University of British Columbia. In 2000, Mr. Winn was selected by then Heritage Minister Sheila Copps to the board of directors of the Canadian Race Relations Foundation.

He resigned from his membership with the Law Society of British Columbia in 2004 over trust account violations.

== See also ==
- Canadian Race Relations Foundation
- Canadian Broadcasting Corporation
