= Taylor Lindsay-Noel =

Canadian disability rights activist (born 1993)

- Born: 1993 (age 32–33)
- Education: Ryerson University
- Known for: disability rights activism, tea company

Taylor Lindsay-Noel (born 1993) is a Canadian former gymnast, disability rights activist, and entrepreneur.

== Gymnastics career and accident ==
Taylor Lindsay-Noel began rigorous training as a gymnast while still in elementary school. Her goal was to compete at the 2012 Summer Olympics, and then to study sports medicine at UCLA.

Lindsay-Noel trained under coach Brian McVey at Sport Seneca alongside gymnasts like Elyse Hopfner-Hibbs. On July 15, 2008, when she was 14 years old, she fell from the uneven bars, breaking her neck. The accident rendered her quadriplegic. She was treated at Holland Bloorview Kids Rehabilitation Hospital in Toronto.

== Life after accident and tea company ==
After leaving the hospital, Lindsay-Noel returned to Northview Heights Secondary School, where she began writing poetry and became student council president. She then continued to Ryerson University, studying radio and television arts.

While at university, Lindsay-Noel started a podcast called Tea Time with Tay. She credits her Caribbean background for her love of tea. When her attempts to get a tea company to sponsor her podcast were unsuccessful, she decided to start her own. She founded Cup of Té in 2018, and in 2020, it was featured in Oprah’s Favorite Things in O Magazine.

She appeared as a non-speaking extra in the 2026 biopic Being Heumann.

== Activism ==
Lindsay-Noel runs a TikTok account where she reviews venues for their wheelchair accessibility. One of her videos about a negative experience at a restaurant she had been told was accessible gained almost a million views in one day and was covered by the media. Another accessibility review had 1.6 million views as of June 2022. She has also spoken out about ableism in the fashion industry and the need for inclusive fashion.
