= Nadine Spencer =

Canadian business woman

- Born: Kingston, Jamaica
- Education: York University, Toronto
- Occupations: Author, public speaker, dei expert
- Website: www.nadinespencer.com

Nadine Ann Marie Spencer is a Jamaican-born Canadian businesswoman, activist, and philanthropist. She is the chief executive officer of BrandEQ Agency, a marketing and communications agency.

She was the CEO of the Black Business and Professional Association (BBPA), stepping down in Fall 2023.

== Early life ==
Spencer grew up in Kingston, Jamaica, and emigrated to Toronto, Canada at the age of 12. She graduated from York University with an Honours Bachelor of Arts Degree in Political Science in 1987.

== Career ==
Spencer has owned several businesses in the antique, food, and marketing field. She also created "The Food Network Presents: The Delicious Food Show", which featured celebrity chefs Padma Lakshmi, Colin Cowie, Lynn Crawford, Mark McEwan, and David Rocco.

She is the chief executive officer of BrandEQ Group Inc. and was the CEO of the Black Business and Professional Association (BBPA) until stepping down in Fall 2023.

Spencer is on York University's Board of Governors as of May 2021.

== Business and DEI ==
Spencer is a significant contributor on topics such as business, women, and diversity. She has participated in discussions with the White House on issues related to anti-discrimination and equity for women and girls of colour.

Spencer has been featured in The New York Times, Bloomberg, Women's Post, The Toronto Star, The Toronto Sun and other trade journals, as well as TV appearances that include Breakfast Television, City-Line and PBS’s Find!.

She is featured on the Successful Black Women Entrepreneurs & Executives list, along with Oprah Winfrey, Michele J. Hooper and Michelle Gadsden-Williams.

== Awards ==
Spencer has won numerous awards for her achievements, including:

- The UN Volunteer Award
- Harry Jerome Award for Business
- Dale Carnegie Highest Achievement Award for Public Speaking

== Investigations and Governance Review ==
In 2023–2024, the Black Business and Professional Association (BBPA), a longstanding advocacy organization for Black business professionals in Canada, faced scrutiny regarding financial practices. Some members raised concerns about contracts awarded to entities linked to Spencer. BBPA and Spencer have denied any wrongdoing.

In June 2024, CBC reported on BrandEQ, noting questions regarding employee records. Spencer stated that certain documentation could not be shared due to employee confidentiality.

Members of the BBPA also raised questions about BrandEQ receiving over $1.1 million in contracted work from the organization between 2017 and 2023 while Spencer served as CEO or on the board. The payments were for branding and marketing services provided by BrandEQ.

In response, the BBPA initiated an external review and a forensic audit to examine potential financial discrepancies and governance issues. Several board members active during the periods under review resigned to avoid conflicts of interest, and Janelle St. Omer was appointed Interim-Chair. The organization emphasized transparency and accountability, particularly in light of funding received from the National Ecosystem Fund, which provided $5 million over four years to support Black-led business initiatives.

Spencer stated that during her tenure as volunteer president (2017–2021) and interim CEO during the COVID-19 pandemic, she oversaw emergency support programs for Black entrepreneurs, including hiring Black-owned contractors and delivering aid to businesses and students. She emphasized that all contracts with her firm, BrandEQ, were handled ethically and transparently, and highlighted the challenges of transitioning BBPA to a professional, program-focused organization.
