= Tanya Walker (lawyer) =

Tanya Walker is a lawyer in Toronto, Ontario, Canada, practising in the field of commercial litigation law. She is the founder and proprietor of Walker Law Professional Corporation which has been in operation since 2010.

== Education ==
Walker obtained her law degree from Osgoode Hall Law School at York University in 2005. She also took an Honours Bachelor of Commerce degree with a minor in Economics at McMaster University in 2002. Since 2006, she has been a member of the Ontario Bar.

== Community Involvement ==
Walker is a member of the following organizations:

- Franchise Executive of the Ontario Bar Association;
- American Bar Association Forum on Franchising;
- Board of Directors of the Osgoode Hall Law School Alumni Association;
- Advocates Society;
- Canadian Association of Women Executives and Entrepreneurs;
- Canadian Association of Black Lawyers; and
- Black Business and Professional Association.

== Awards ==
- In 2015, Walker received the Traditional Law Practice Award and the Rising Star Award.
- In 2014, Walker was presented with the Ambassador for Peace Honour by the Universal Peace Federation and the Women's Federation for World Peace.
- In 2013, Walker was the recipient of the Young Entrepreneur Award from the Black Business and Professional Association.
- In 2010 and 2012, Walker was featured on the official Black History Month posters entitled "The Next Generation" and "It takes a Village to Raise a Child". These posters were displayed throughout public buildings and offices of Canada, such as schools, fire stations and libraries.
- In 2012, the Sickle Cell Miracle Network presented Walker with the Award of Excellence for Community Service.
- Walker was selected by popular vote from amongst 19 other candidates to receive the 2010 Woman's Enterprise Woman of the Year Award.
