= Eugenia Duodu Addy =

Canadian chemist; CEO of Visions of Science Network for Learning

Eugenia Duod
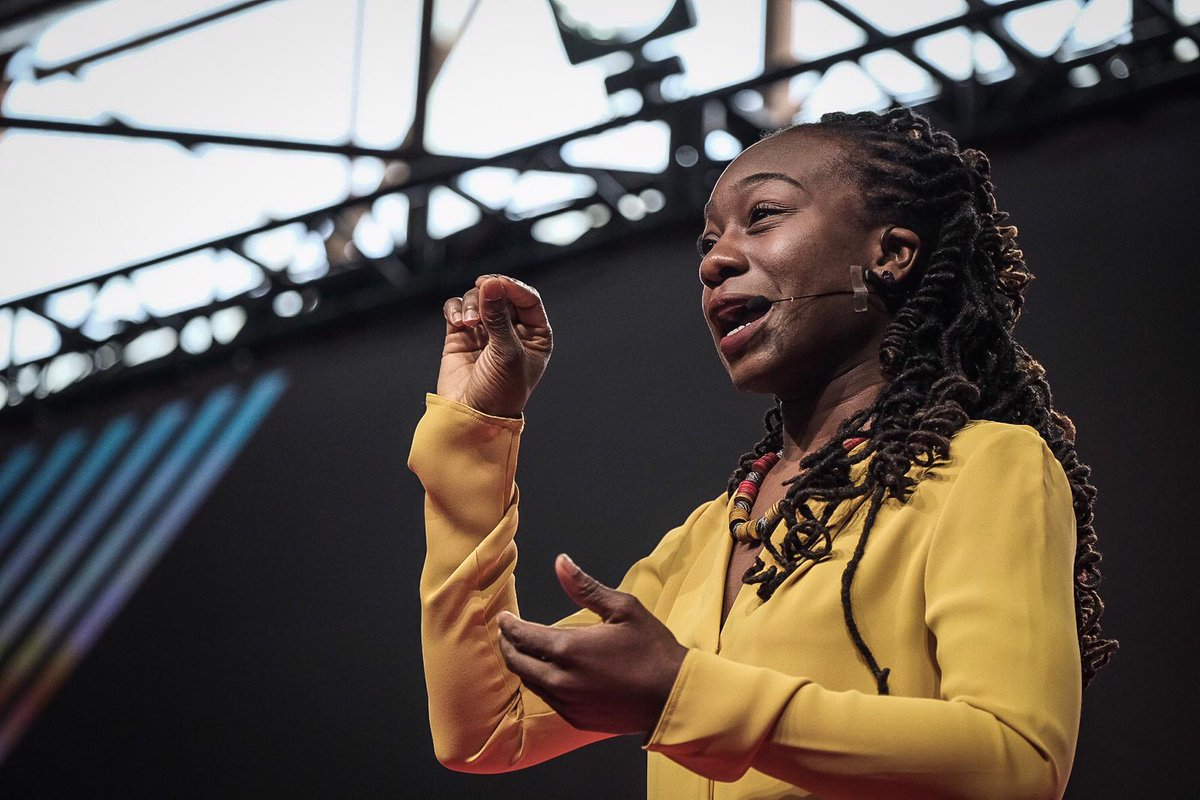
- Education: University of Toronto (BSc, PhD)
- Known for: Co-founding Visions of Science and Network for Learning
- Scientific career
- Thesis: The Development of Receptors and Chemosensors for the Recognition of Proximally Phosphorylated Motifs (2015)
- Doctoral advisor: Patrick Gunning

Dr. Eugenia Duodu Addy is a Canadian chemist and the CEO of Visions of Science Network for Learning (VoSNL).

== Early life and education ==
Duodu grew up in a Toronto Community Housing (TCH) development in Etobicoke. She credits her teachers and past TCH mentors for fostering her passion in science, but also notes that as she further progressed through science training, she was one of the few remaining black women or from community housing. As a child, Duodu remembers creating her own science fairs at home, inspired by Bill Nye on television, and credits her mom for encouraging her aptitude in science and math, despite facing racism from teachers.

In high school she was encouraged by a teacher to attend a summer mentorship program with the University of Toronto geared towards encouraging Black and Indigenous students to pursue university degrees in STEM. The mentorship program included job shadowing scientists in labs and doctors in hospitals where she and other students were taught to read X-Rays and study MRIs.

=== Undergraduate Work ===
In 2010, Duodu completed a Bachelor of Science degree in chemistry and biology at the University of Toronto while studying on its Mississauga campus. Duodu then pursued a PhD in medicinal chemistry at the same campus, under the supervision of Patrick Gunning, where her thesis focused on developing phosphoprotein recognition agents for disease detection and treatment.

=== Graduate Work ===
During her PhD, Duodu volunteered with VoSNL - a non-profit organization which provides science, technology, engineering and mathematics (STEM) focused educational programs, through weekly local science clubs, for youth from low-income and marginalized communities. Duodu coordinated weekend science clubs for Grade 4-8 children living in TCH developments, and was a member of the VoSNL board of directors. Duodu also co-founded the Creating Global Citizens project, through which she worked with TCH youth communities to furnish a Ghanaian library, as well as other initiatives in Uganda, Tanzania, Jamaica and Trinidad.

== Career ==
Duodu is currently the CEO of VoSNL. She currently takes part in several activities to improve science literacy, where her goal is to make a long-lasting impact in disadvantaged communities through STEM engagement and thus allow youth to unlock their potential. When she began volunteering with VoSNL in 2015, the organization was working with six communities and had an operations budget of $20,000. As of 2020, the operating budget was $1.2 million and the organization serves approximately 1,500 students from 29 communities. The organization has six full-time staff, twenty-four part-time staff, and over ninety volunteers. VoSNL receives funding support from the Natural Sciences and Engineering Research Council of Canada and the Ontario Trillium Foundation.

In 2018, at a TEDxYouth@Toronto event, Duodu shared her science journey in a talk titled "The 'Unlikely' Scientist."

== Awards and recognition ==
- In 2021, Duodu won the Life Sciences Ontario Community Service award
- She received the 2020 RBC Women of Influence Social Change Award
- Additionally, Duodu won the Afroglobal Television Excellence Awards’ 2020 Science and Technology Award
- Duodu received the 2014-15 Queen Elizabeth II/Pfizer Canada Graduate Scholarship in Science and Technology
- In 2012, Duodu was awarded the Harry Jerome CIBC Academics Award by the Black Business and Professional Association (BBPA).
- In 2013, Duodu received an Adel S. Sedra Distinguished Graduate Award, which is a $25,000 fellowship to recognize a graduate student who demonstrates academic and extra-curricular leadership.
- Duodu was also recognized as one of the 50 faces of the University of Toronto Mississauga - an initiative to celebrate individuals who have influenced or been influenced by the university.

== Selected academic publications ==
- Duodu E., Noble J., Yusuf Y., Garay C. and Bean, C. "Understanding the delivery of a Canadian-based after-school STEM program: a case study." International Journal of STEM Education. 2017 Dec, 4:20.
- Duodu E, Kraskouskaya D, Gómez-Biagi RF, Gunning PT. "A tool for the selective sequestration of ATP and PPi to aid in-solution phosphopeptide detection assays." Analyst. 2016 Feb 7;141(3):820-2.
- Duodu E, Kraskouskaya D, Campbell J, Graca-Lima G, Gunning PT. "Selective detection of tyrosine-containing proximally phosphorylated motifs using an antenna-free Tb^{3+} luminescent sensor." Chemical Communications (Camb). 2015 Apr 18;51(30):6675-7.
- Kraskouskaya D, Duodu E, Arpin CC, Gunning PT. "Progress towards the development of SH2 domain inhibitors." Chemical Society Review. 2013 Apr 21;42(8):3337-70.
- Drewry JA, Duodu E, Mazouchi A, Spagnuolo P, Burger S, Gradinaru CC, Ayers P, Schimmer AD, Gunning PT. "Phosphopeptide selective coordination complexes as promising SRC homology 2 domain mimetics." Inorganic Chemistry. 2012 Aug 6;51(15):8284-91.
