= Newfoundland and Labrador Medical Association =

The Newfoundland and Labrador Medical Association (NLMA) is the voice of organized medicine in Newfoundland and Labrador, Canada. The Association represents the views of the physicians of the province with governments, the media and the general public. It also advocates on behalf of all patients for a fair and equitable health care system in Newfoundland and Labrador, and Canada.

The NLMA represents the political, clinical and economic interests of the province’s medical profession. Practicing physicians, residents and students enrolled at Memorial University’s Faculty of Medicine are eligible for membership in the Association. The province’s Medical Act requires that all practicing physicians hold membership in the Association as a condition of licensure.

== History ==
Founded in 1924 as a voluntary association of the province’s physicians, the NLMA has from its beginning played a vital role in the development and promotion of health care services across the province. Today, the NLMA represents some 1,200 practicing physicians in the province.

== Governance ==
The NLMA is governed by its members, who meet each year for the annual general meeting. Between meetings of the general membership, the Board of Directors acts as the NLMA’s governing body, and exercises the rights and powers of the Association. The Board of Directors is elected by the general membership at the annual meeting. There is also an extensive committee structure. The day-to-day work is conducted by a staff of nine at NLMA House in St. John's.

== Funding ==
A division of the Canadian Medical Association (CMA), the NLMA is a non-profit professional organization funded primarily by its members.
