= Premier of Newfoundland and Labrador =

Head of government of Newfoundland and Labrador

- Coat of arms of Newfoundland and Labrador

- Flag of Newfoundland and Labrador

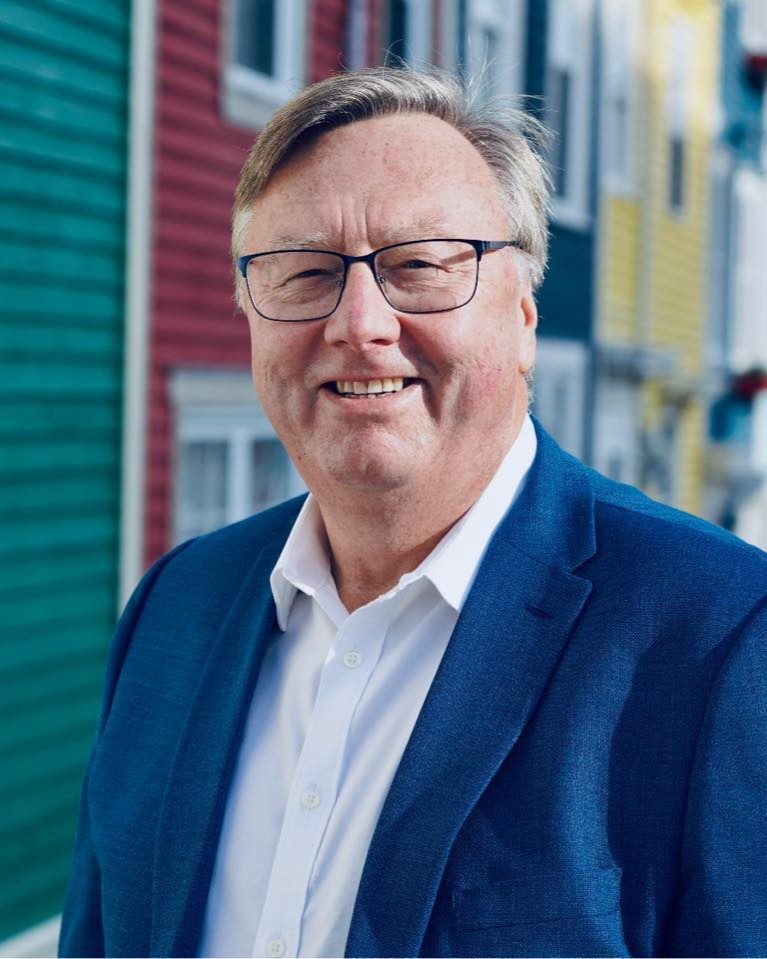
- Incumbent; Tony Wakeham since 29 October 2025
- Office of the Premier
- Style: The Honourable (formal); Premier (informal)
- Status: Head of Government
- Member of: House Assembly; Executive Council
- Reports to: House Assembly; Lieutenant Governor
- Seat: Confederation Building, East Block, St. John's
- Appointer: Lieutenant Governor of Newfoundland and Labrador; with the confidence of the Newfoundland and Labrador Legislature
- Term length: At His Majesty's pleasure; contingent on the premier's ability to command confidence in the legislative assembly
- Precursor: Prime Minister of Newfoundland (1907–1934)
- Formation: May 7, 1855 (pre-Confederation); April 1, 1949 (post-Confederation)
- First holder: Philip Francis Little (pre-Confederation); Joey Smallwood (post-Confederation)
- Final holder: Frederick C. Alderdice (pre-Confederation)
- Deputy: Deputy premier of Newfoundland and Labrador
- Salary: $95,357 plus $39,514 (indemnity and allowances)
- Website: Office of the Premier

The premier of Newfoundland and Labrador is the first minister and head of government for the Canadian province of Newfoundland and Labrador. Since 1949, the premier's duties and office has been the successor to the ministerial position of the prime minister of the former Dominion of Newfoundland. Before 2001, the official title was Premier of Newfoundland.

The premier is appointed by the lieutenant governor of Newfoundland and Labrador, as representative of the King in Right of Newfoundland and Labrador. They are usually the leader of the party that commands a majority in the House of Assembly. The word premier is derived from the French word of the same spelling, meaning "first"; and ultimately from the Latin word primarius, meaning "primary".

The current premier of Newfoundland and Labrador is Tony Wakeham, since October 29, 2025. He represents Stephenville-Port au Port in the Newfoundland and Labrador House of Assembly.

== Formal responsibilities ==
The responsibilities of the premier usually include:

- serving as the president of the Executive Council and head of the provincial Cabinet; The Executive Council is the formal name of the Cabinet when it is acting in its legal capacity;
- serving as the head of the provincial government;
- leading the development and implementation of government policies and priorities;
- serving as the senior communicator of government priorities and plans between:
  - the lieutenant governor and Cabinet;
  - the Newfoundland and Labrador government and other provincial and territorial governments;
  - the Newfoundland and Labrador government and the federal government and international governments;
- functions in respect of the Province of Newfoundland and Labrador, such as recommending to the lieutenant governor the appointment of cabinet ministers and allocating ministerial portfolios;
- serving as leader of a major political party and its caucus of MHAs, and
- representing their constituency in the House of Assembly.

== Office of the Premier of Newfoundland and Labrador ==
The Office of the Premier is located at the Confederation Building East Block. Staff at the office consists of:

- Director of Communications
- Special assistant (Strategic Communications)
- Special assistant (Communications)

== See also ==
- Prime Minister of Canada
- Premier (Canada)
- List of premiers of Newfoundland and Labrador
