= Newfoundland Tricolour =

Unofficial flag of Newfoundland and Labrador

The Newfoundland Tricolour
- The Newfoundland Tricolour Flag
- Proportion: 1:2
- Design: A vertical tricolour of green, white, and pink.

The Newfoundland Tricolour, or the Pink, White and Green, is an unofficial flag of the Canadian province of Newfoundland and Labrador, and is mistakenly believed to have been an official Flag of Newfoundland and Labrador, or more commonly, of the island of Newfoundland specifically.

Its proportions are 1:2 with three pales of equal width coloured green (hoist side), white (centre), and pink (on the fly). The design originated in the late 19th century with the Newfoundland Fishermen's Star of the Sea Association, an aid and benefit organization established in St. John's in 1871 by the Catholic Church. The flag was unofficial but the official banner of the association was a green background with a white star and a pink cross in the centre. The Star of the Sea is Polaris, the North Star, which was very important in navigation. Mary, mother of Jesus, is also known as Our Lady, Star of the Sea. While the colours were taken from the official banner of the association, the flag's design may have been influenced by the then unofficial Irish tricolour and or a local design (red at the hoist, white in the centre and green on the fly tricolour) which was used by the Newfoundland Natives' Society (NNS) from the mid 1800s. The NNS flag had fallen out of use since the demise of the society. With the introduction of the unofficial Labrador flag in March 1974 and the official change of the province's name to "Newfoundland and Labrador" in December 2001 the green-white-pink tricolour is generally considered to be the unofficial flag of the Newfoundland region of the province.

== Origins ==
Official flag of Ireland

Historical evidence indicates that the "Pink, White and Green" flag first appeared in the late 1880s to early 1890s as the flag of the Roman Catholic fraternal group the Newfoundland Fishermen's Star of the Sea Association, which was formed in St. John's in 1871. It bears a strong resemblance to the Flag of Ireland, which first appeared in 1848 as an unofficial emblem for Ireland but did not enter wide use until 1916, but with the Protestant representation of the orange panel of King William of Orange removed and replaced by a pink panel; pink or rose being a liturgical colour of the Catholic church and an official colour of the Star of the Sea Association.

=== Popular mythical origins ===
A popular legend presented in the July 1976 issue of the Roman Catholic archdiocese's newsletter The Monitor is commonly (though erroneously) believed to present the origins of the flag. The legend tells that the flag was created in 1843 by Bishop Michael Anthony Fleming and is symbolic of a tradition between local Protestants and Catholics. The annual wood hauls of firewood by sealers, waiting for their vessels to leave the port of St. John's, would get embroiled in a competition to supply wood to the local Anglican cathedral, Roman Catholic cathedral, schools and other charity institutions. The Protestant English marked their wood piles with the rose flag of the Newfoundland Natives' Society, while the Catholic Irish used green banners. The threat of violence was such that the Speaker of the House, William Carson, suggested that Bishop Fleming should be enlisted as a peacemaker. Rather than simply preaching sermons, it was decided that Fleming would try to unite the sides. To that end, Bishop Fleming persuaded the two factions to adopt a common flag, tying together the rose and green flags of the two groups with a white handkerchief, which was to symbolize peace. The pink/rose-colour is said to have symbolized the Protestant English since a rose (the Tudor rose) is the national floral emblem of England. This has been questioned as the Tudor Rose is actually red and white, not pink, while the green of the shamrock symbolized the mostly Catholic Irish. The white was taken from the Cross of St. Andrew, the patron saint of fishermen and Scotland.

Saint Patrick's Cross, a red saltire on a field of white

This is not the original version of the legend, however, but rather appears to be a modification of an older legend intended to incorporate Protestant English representation into a flag originating within the Roman Catholic Irish community. In 1900 historians Devine and O'Mara told that the concept of the flag was originated by Bishop Fleming in the mid-19th century as a symbolic gesture to quiet tensions between newly arriving Irish settlers and the existing Roman Catholic community in the St. John's area. The local Newfoundland 'Bush-borns' and 'Old Country' Irish-borns were embroiled in rivalry to supply the biggest load of wood to the Roman Catholic Cathedral during the big yearly wood haul. There was argument over which group had the larger load and violence between them ensued. Upon hearing of this, Fleming induced them to join their pink and green wood slide markers together with neutral white being placed in between and thus was born the concept which eventually became the pink, white and green flag of the Star of the Sea fraternal association for Catholics. In this version of the story, pink similarly represented Newfoundland-born Catholics, possibly members of a "natives" group, that were supplying wood to Fleming himself, with the Protestant English not included in the proceedings at all. Devine and O'Mara conceded that this story was based on oral tradition with no actual historical evidence to support it.

In 1902, however, the colour pink (rose) was designated to represent the "rose of England" by the first Newfoundland-born Roman Catholic bishop and future Archbishop of St. John's Michael Francis Howley in the poem The Flag of Newfoundland, which he is credited as having written at that time and proposing it as an alternative national anthem to Sir Charles Cavendish Boyle's Ode to Newfoundland – Boyle being Newfoundland's British colonial governor from 1901 to 1904. Howley attempted to overcome the perception of the "Pink, White and Green" as a Catholic flag by incorporating Protestant representation and turning the flag into a symbol representing all Newfoundlanders. This was a somewhat awkward assertion since the "rose of England"is not pink/rose. However, the national floral emblem of England is a rose, the red and white Tudor rose instituted by King Henry VII as the symbol of unified England following what became known as the War of the Roses. Historically, the colour pink/rose has never been used to represent England, its people or any of the Protestant churches of England or Newfoundland. However, the colour pink seen as rose could be said to evoke the image of a rose which is England's floral emblem. Pink/rose is a liturgical colour of the Roman Catholic church. Pink/rose was in use by other Catholic organizations in St. John's at the time. Furthermore, the Star of the Sea Association's original banner, predating the green-white-pink tricolour, consisted of a white star and a pink cross on a green background, as specified in their original rules and by-laws. Incidentally, by specifying the colour green in the poem as representing "St. Patrick's emblem", the shamrock, Howley joined many Irish nationalists in rejecting the red saltire of Saint Patrick's Cross, which they see as a British invention and which forms the diagonal red cross of the Union Jack meant to represent Ireland. Nevertheless, Howley was somewhat successful as many but not most Newfoundlanders accepted it as a national symbol of Newfoundland.

=== Actual historical origins ===
There is no historical evidence to support Bishop Fleming ever creating the pink, white and green flag. The first published record of the now popularly accepted legend was in a Catholic church archdiocese newsletter during the provincial flag debates of the 1970s, and was not presented as fact at that time. The Newfoundland Natives' Society flag is believed by some historians to have consisted of a green spruce tree on a pink background with two clasped hands and the word "philanthropy" eventually added, though there is no hard evidence to support that this flag ever really existed, that it was ever abandoned, or that the pink, white and green tricolour was ever adopted by the society The NNS was not a Catholic or Protestant society but a nationalist group formed specifically to promote the advancement of careers and interests of native-born Newfoundlanders, no matter what their ethnic origin or religious affiliation. Its first president, elected by members of the society in 1840, was a Roman Catholic physician by the name of Dr. Edward Kielly. From its early days, it served as a vehicle to allow Newfoundland-born Roman Catholics who opposed Bishop Fleming's political influence to work alongside Protestant reformers (then affiliated with the "Tory" party) and was openly opposed by Fleming. Available history indicates that the society actually used a tricolour flag of red, white and green, raising the speculation that it was this flag that symbolized peace between the Irish Catholics and English Protestants within the society since red and white was a more fitting representation of the red and white Tudor Rose of England, and the society itself being expressly non-denominational.

The red, white and green tricolour of the Newfoundland Natives' Society (NNS) was widely recognized as the flag of Newfoundland during the mid- to late-nineteenth century. With the introduction of Responsible Government in 1855 the need for the NNS waned and it ceased operations in 1866. The red-white-green flag gradually disappeared from use. The pink, white and green colours of the Catholic Church established Newfoundland Fishermen's Star of the Sea Association, as specified in their first published rules and by-laws, appeared sometime after the group's formation in 1871 and may have been confused with the NNS's red, white and green tricolour by reporters and from black-and-white photographs of the period, from which it is impossible to distinguish the actual colours. There is no reason to believe that the pink and green colours of the Star of the Sea Association flag were intended as a symbol of union between Catholic groups as in the Devine and O'Mara legend. With the Association's inception in 1871, their by-laws stated "the banner of the Association shall be green ground, white star with pink cross in the centre" and the officers "shall wear, at all processions, sashes of green, white and pink." The actual tricolour flag based on these colours, commonly called the "Pink, White and Green", seems to have surfaced within the Association sometime in the late 1880s and there is no known historical evidence to indicate its existence before that time. The Newfoundland Fishermen's Star of the Sea Association appeared publicly under these colours, in the form of green, white and pink sashes and green banner with a pink cross and white star for the first time in 1875 when they marched alongside the Benevolent Irish Society in St. John's during their centenary celebrations parade of Irish nationalist Daniel O'Connell's birth. Newspaper descriptions of this event report the NNS's red, white and green flag being flown prominently as the flag of Newfoundland, alongside the flags of England, Ireland, France and the United States, but make no mention of a pink, white and green tricolour. Sometime afterward, the "Pink, White and Green" tricolour appeared and, with the support of the clergy, was adopted by other Catholic groups in the St. John's and surrounding area in the 1880s and 1890s.

Official flag of Newfoundland and Labrador, 1980 to present.

It has been suggested on some websites and commercial tourist items that the Irish flag was based on the "Pink, White and Green," the basis for this claim being that Irish nationalist Thomas Francis Meagher was the son of Newfoundland-born mayor of Waterford, Ireland, Thomas Meagher Jr., and had designed the Irish flag based on the "Pink, White and Green". Irish history, however, states that the design that would become the Irish flag goes back as far as 1830 and had widespread recognition by 1848. From March of that year, Irish tricolours appeared side by side with French tricolours at meetings held all over France to celebrate the revolution that had just taken place. In April 1848, Meagher brought a tricolour of green, white and orange to Ireland from Paris, where it is said he received it as a gesture of goodwill from a group of French women. It was presented in a Dublin council meeting and was likely patterned after the French Tricolour flag as a symbolic show of solidarity between the two countries. The green, white and orange Irish tricolour was used unofficially by nationalists as a symbol of opposition to the British government until being adopted publicly by the Irish Republican Army (IRA) during the Easter Uprising of 1916. Despite the popular myth, the earliest historical evidence supporting the appearance of the "Pink, White, and Green" in Newfoundland points to at least 41 years after the first appearance of the then unofficial Irish tricolour flag and possibly as late as 60 years thereafter.

Given this, its origin within a Roman Catholic fraternal group and the first public appearance of the colours in a centenary celebration of Daniel O'Connell's birth, the "Pink, White and Green" flag may have been based on the then unofficial Irish tricolour flag with the orange panel representing Protestant King William of Orange removed and replaced by pink being a liturgical colour of the Roman Catholic church and also an official colour on the banner of the Star of the Sea Association. The subsequent use of the "Pink, White and Green" by Catholic Irish groups in the St. John's area as a symbol of Newfoundland nationalism and opposition to confederation with Canada in the late 1800s further linked the flag to its Irish counterpart by analogy to Irish nationalists flying of the strikingly similar Irish tricolour in their resistance to union with Britain.

Given the inaccuracy of The Monitor's 1976 legend and the heated debates in Newfoundland during the 1970s regarding the design of the new provincial flag, the current legend of the "Pink, White and Green" was likely propagated at that time in an attempt to gain Protestant (60% of the province's population) and province-wide support for an Irish-based flag, rather than the various Union Jack based designs being proposed at the time, but it is not supported as a factual account of history. From 1931 until confederation with Canada in 1949 the Union Jack was legislated as the national flag of Newfoundland, and then from 1952 until 1980 the Union Jack was readopted as the official flag of the province of Newfoundland. Ottawa's refusal to recognize the Union Jack as a unique representation of the province led to the provincial government seeking a new Newfoundland flag and the eventual adoption of Christopher Pratt's design as the Flag of Newfoundland and Labrador on 28 May 1980. The new flag's design was taken from markings on pendants worn hung from a cord around the neck by the indigenous Beothuck and Innu people. With the colours blue, white and red applied it has an intentional resemblance to the Union Jack it replaced.

== Use and popular myth ==
The Union Flag, Newfoundland's official provincial flag from 1952 to 1980.

Around the turn of the 20th century, the "Pink White and Green" flag gained significant social and possibly commercial use, primarily by Roman Catholic groups in the St. John's and surrounding area. It remained controversial, however, as many Protestants did not accept it as their own flag, feeling that it was, in fact, a Roman Catholic/Irish nationalist flag. Bishop Michael Fleming, credited in popular legend as its creator was, in fact, a self-fashioned leader of the Irish community in Newfoundland and pursued an "Irish nationalistic" agenda in taking on the local British establishment, even to the point of intervening to get particular men elected. In 1904, the "Pink, White and Green" was a central symbol for those opposed to confederation with Canada, a sentiment supported by Roman Catholic Archbishop Michael F. Howley and his clergy, particularly on the east coast, thus further associating the flag with the Catholic Church and Irish nationalism in the eyes of many Protestants.

The Newfoundland Red Ensign, Newfoundland's civil flag from 1904 to 1965

Contrary to popular myth, photos from Government House during Murray's and Boyle's administrations and during the Prince of Wales visit to Newfoundland in 1860 show the Union Jack, the governmental ensigns, and various other flags being flown on ships in St. John's harbour, but not the "Pink, White and Green". Captain Robert Bartlett, who captained Admiral Peary on his ultimate polar expedition in 1909, was claimed by members of his crew to have planted the "Pink, White and Green" within six miles of the North Pole. This was in fact untrue, as Bartlett was never closer than 150 miles (241 km) from the pole, with Peary continuing on sled without Bartlett or his crew from there. The tricolour is said to have been flown alongside the Union Jack at Government House during the administrations of Boyle and Murray, though there is no photographic evidence from the period to support this, with existing photos showing only the Union Jack and governmental Ensigns. An official mail steamer was to be seen flying the tricolour as late as 1907 but was forced by authorities to replace it with the Newfoundland Red Ensign, the civil flag of Newfoundland vessels, upon entering St. John's harbour. After the First World War its use diminished and Newfoundlanders generally flew the Union Jack as their flag - the Union Jack being legislated as the Dominion of Newfoundland's official flag in 1931, with the Newfoundland Red Ensign designated as "National Colours". In recent years, the "Pink, White and Green" flag has undergone a revival, and has become popular on T-shirts incorrectly referring to it as "the Republic of Newfoundland flag," despite the fact that the flag was never officially recognized as a national or provincial flag, and although Newfoundland was a British Dominion from 26 September 1907 it was never a republic and there was never a republican movement in Newfoundland. See: Dominion of Newfoundland.

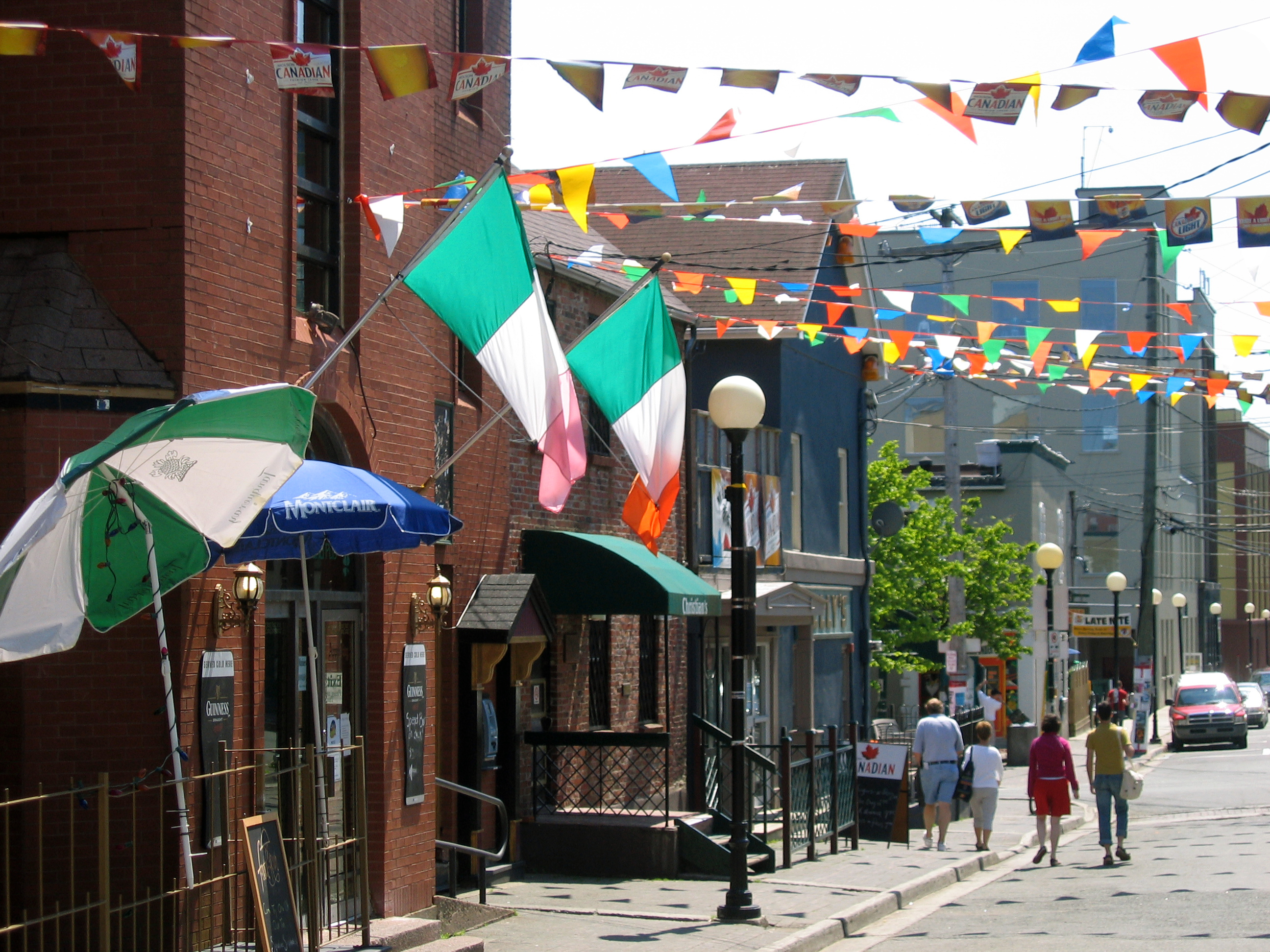
Newfoundland tricolour along with the Irish flag in St. John's, 2005

It has been claimed that the colours of the flag were incorporated into the first public performance of Sir Cavendish Boyle's "Ode to Newfoundland" at the Casino Theatre in 1901, where a character resembling the Statue of Liberty clad in a flowing gown of vertical stripes of pink, white and green is said to have appeared on stage. The next day the colours appeared on the cover of the music sheet published by Boyle. The pink, white and green tricolour did, in fact, appear on the first published sheet music of Boyle's "Ode to Newfoundland", which was published in January 1902, however, the music which was eventually used for the Ode came later and is used to this day. Connecting the pink, white and green with the Ode to Newfoundland was clever but not definitive. The cover to that sheet music depicted the "Pink, White and Green" being held by a fisherman and intertwined with the Union Jack being held by a Royal Navy sailor. It is unsubstantiated, however, that the PWG tricolour appeared in connection with the first performance of the "Ode to Newfoundland" at the Casino Theatre. The first performance of the Ode to Newfoundland actually took place on 22 December 1902 as part of the closing of the play Mamzelle - a play in which the French character Marianne, bearing a strong resemblance to the Statue of Liberty, appears clothed in a tricolour gown of red, white and blue based on the French tricolour.

The green-white-pink tricolour exists in Canadian heraldry. Its trice is present in the flag of the St. John's Fire Department. It also appears on the crest on some escutcheons or armorial bearings portrayed in the Public Register of Arms, Flags and Badges of Canada. The tricolour had a resurgence in the province, particularly in the city of St. John's, and there was a popular movement to petition the province to give the flag official status. Premier Danny Williams announced in late 2005 that he would consider opening debate on the matter, and that he personally preferred the tricolour, but an informal poll commissioned in October 2005 by Williams showed that only 25% of Newfoundlanders supported adopting the tricolour - with cost and the feeling that the colour pink would not be appropriate for the provincial flag being cited as the most popular reasons for rejection. The majority of support for the "Pink, White and Green" came from St. John's and surrounding Irish Shore area.

== Poem ==
The following poem, entitled The Flag of Newfoundland written by Roman Catholic Archbishop Michael F. Howley in 1902 to support acceptance of the tricolour as an official flag for Newfoundland. The poem was proposed as an alternative national anthem to Sir Charles Cavendish Boyle's Ode to Newfoundland. It is the first known reference to the "Pink, White and Green" flag as being the flag of Newfoundland and marks the first designation of the pink panel as representing the "rose of England". In another attempt to gain acceptance of the PWG as a flag for Newfoundland, sheet music composed by E.R. Krippner for the Ode to Newfoundland was published with the Union Jack and the PWG tricolour on the cover. However, music composed later by Sir Hubert Parry was chosen by Boyle and is the music used with the Ode to Newfoundland to this day.

1.The pink, the rose of England shows,
The green St. Patrick's emblem, bright
While in between, the spotless sheen
Of St. Andrew's cross displays the white.
2.Then hail the pink, the white, the green,
Our patriot flag, long may it stand.
Our sirelands twine, their emblems trine
To form the flag of Newfoundland.
3.What'er betide our Ocean Bride
That nestles 'midst Atlantic's foam,
Still far and wide we'll raise with pride
A native flag, o'er hearth and home.
4.Should e'er the hand of fate demand
Some future change in our career;
We ne'er will yield on flood or field
The flag we honour and revere!
5.Fling out the flag o'er creek and cragg;
Pink, white and green, so fair, so grand.
Long may it sway, o'er bight and bay,
Around the shores of Newfoundland.

== See also ==
- Flag of Newfoundland and Labrador
- Flag of Labrador
