= Great Seal of Newfoundland and Labrador =

Official symbol of Newfoundland and Labrador

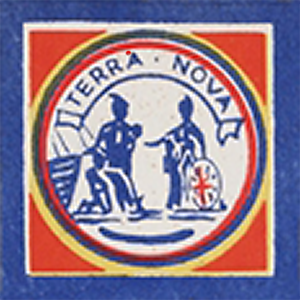
Great Seal of Newfoundland used from 1827 - 1963

The Great Seal of Newfoundland is a seal used to authenticate documents issued by the government of Newfoundland and Labrador that are released in the name of the King in Right of Newfoundland and Labrador, including the appointment of the Executive Council and Ministers (the Cabinet).

== Design ==
The fisherman kneeling before Britannia, a colonial image, was replaced by the coat of arms, with "Newfoundland" written near the bottom curve on a scroll. Encircling the top are the words "Elizabeth II D.G. Canadæ Regina".

== History ==
The earliest documented Great Seal of Newfoundland received royal approval from King George IV on 1 September 1827. It depicts Mercury, the classical god of commerce and merchandise, presenting to Britannia a fisherman who, kneeling, offers her his catch. Below are the words Hæc Tibi Dona Fero (Latin: These gifts I bring thee) and written around the circumference of the seal is Sigillum Terræ Novæ Insulæ – "Seal of the Island of Terra Nova".

In 1837, when Queen Victoria took the throne of England, she approved a new seal for Newfoundland. Britannia, Mercury and the Newfoundland fisherman occupy the bottom two thirds and are contained within an elaborate frame. Above sit the royal arms, with a lion and unicorn on either side. Written around the top edge of the circular seal are the words Victoria Dei Gratia Britanniæ Reg F D (Victoria, by the grace of God, Queen of the Britains, Defender of the Faith), and the bottom edge reads Sigillum Terræ Novæ Insulæ (Seal of the Island of Terra Nova).

== Keeper ==
The keeper of the Great Seal is the Lieutenant Governor of Newfoundland and Labrador.

== See also ==
- Symbols of Newfoundland and Labrador
- Monarchy in Newfoundland and Labrador
