= Symbols of Newfoundland and Labrador =

Symbols of Canadian province

Newfoundland and Labrador is one of Canada's provinces, and has established several official symbols.

Labrador, the mainland portion of the province, has its own distinct cultural identity and has established several unofficial symbols for itself.

== Official symbols of Newfoundland and Labrador ==
	Symbol	Image	Adopted	Remarks
Coat of arms	Coat of arms of Newfoundland and Labrador		1 January 1637/8 (Note: Julian Calendar. Also, though the actual document is dated 1 January 1637 this would translate to 1 January 1638 as the legal year did not start until 25 March. See: Old Style and New Style dates)	Granted by John Borough, Garter King of Arms, during the reign of King Charles I
Motto	Quaerite primum regnum dei, Seek ye first the kingdom of God		1637/8	Granted with other elements of the coat of arms, from The Gospel According to St. Matthew 6:33
Escutcheon	Escutcheon of Newfoundland and Labrador	Shield of Arms of Newfoundland and Labrador	1637/8	
Flag	Flag of Newfoundland and Labrador	Flag of Newfoundland and Labrador.svg	6 June 1980	
Flag of the lieutenant governor	Flag of the lieutenant governor of Newfoundland and Labrador		1987	
Great seal	Great Seal of Newfoundland and Labrador		1827	
Flower	Purple pitcher plant Sarracenia purpurea	Flower: purple pitcher plant	1954	Found on bogs and marshes around the province
Tree	Black spruce Picea mariana	Tree: black spruce	November 1993	The most abundant tree in Labrador
Bird	Atlantic puffin Fratercula arctica	Bird: Atlantic puffin	1991	About 95% of North America's puffins breed on Newfoundland and Labrador coasts
Mineral	Labradorite	Gemstone: Labradorite	1975	The mineral was discovered in northern Labrador
Tartan	Newfoundland tartan	Tartan of Newfoundland and Labrador	1955	Green with gold, white, brown and red bands
Game bird	Partridge or ptarmigan Lagopus	Game bird: Partridge or ptarmigan		Found throughout the province
Animal	Newfoundland pony	Newfoundland pony		
Dogs	Newfoundland dog Labrador Retriever	Newfoundland dog Labrador Retriever		
Anthem	"Ode to Newfoundland"	Sheet music produced for the debut of "Ode to Newfoundland" in 1902.	1980	Written by Governor Sir Cavendish Boyle in 1902
Logo	Provincial logo		3 October 2006	This logo was brought into effect after an audit revealed 40 different provincial logos in use.
Orders	Order of Newfoundland and Labrador		2001	The Order of Newfoundland and Labrador is the highest honour of the province. The medal bears the shield of Newfoundland and Labrador surmounted by the Crown. The medal is worn with a blue, green, white and gold ribbon.

== Unofficial symbols of Labrador ==
	Symbol	Image	Adopted	Remarks
Coat of arms	Coat of arms of Labrador		No date	Assumed, not granted by the Canadian Heraldic Authority
Motto	Munus splendidum mox explebitur, The splendid task will soon be fulfilled		1927	A Latin paraphrase of a line from the Ode to Labrador
Flag	Flag of Labrador	Flag of Newfoundland and Labrador.svg	31 March 1974	Predates the introduction of the current provincial flag by six years
Anthem	Ode to Labrador		1927	Written by physician Harry Paddon in 1927 and set to the tune of O Tannenbaum
Bird	Grey jay	Flag of Newfoundland and Labrador.svg	No date	By resolution of the Combined Councils of Labrador; declared Canada's national bird by Canadian Geographic in September 2017
