= Flag of Newfoundland and Labrador =

Canadian provincial flag

Newfoundland and Labrador
- Use: Civil and state flag
- Proportion: 1:2
- Adopted: June 6, 1980; 46 years ago
- Designed by: Christopher Pratt

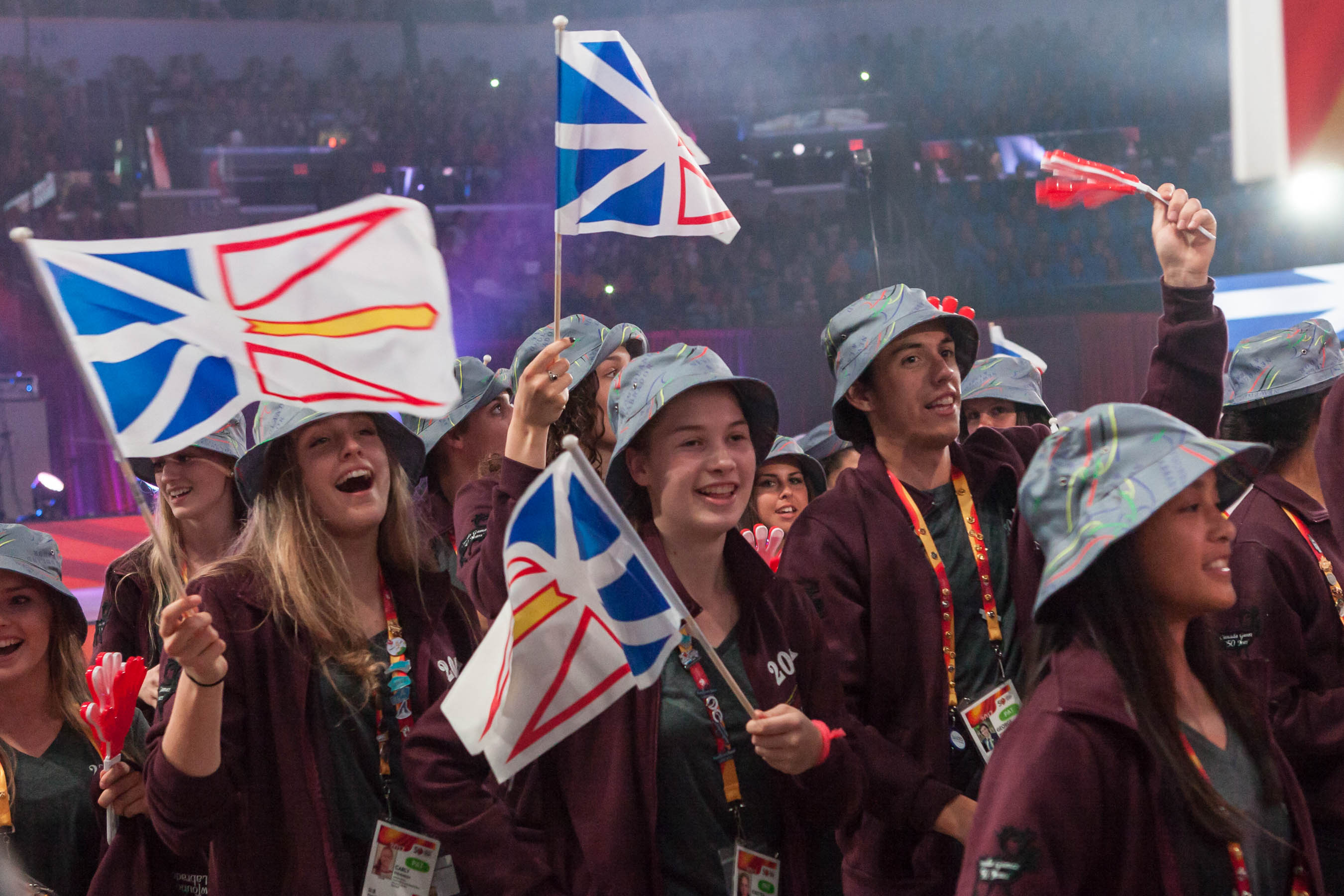
Newfoundland and Labrador team with flags at the 2017 Canada Games

The flag of Newfoundland and Labrador was introduced in 1980 and was designed by Newfoundland artist Christopher Pratt. The flag design was approved by the House of Assembly of the province of Newfoundland, Canada, on May 28, 1980. It was flown for the first time on Discovery Day, June 24, 1980. The name of the province was changed to Newfoundland and Labrador by an amendment to the constitution of Canada in December 2001 at the request of the provincial legislature.

== Design ==
=== Symbolism ===
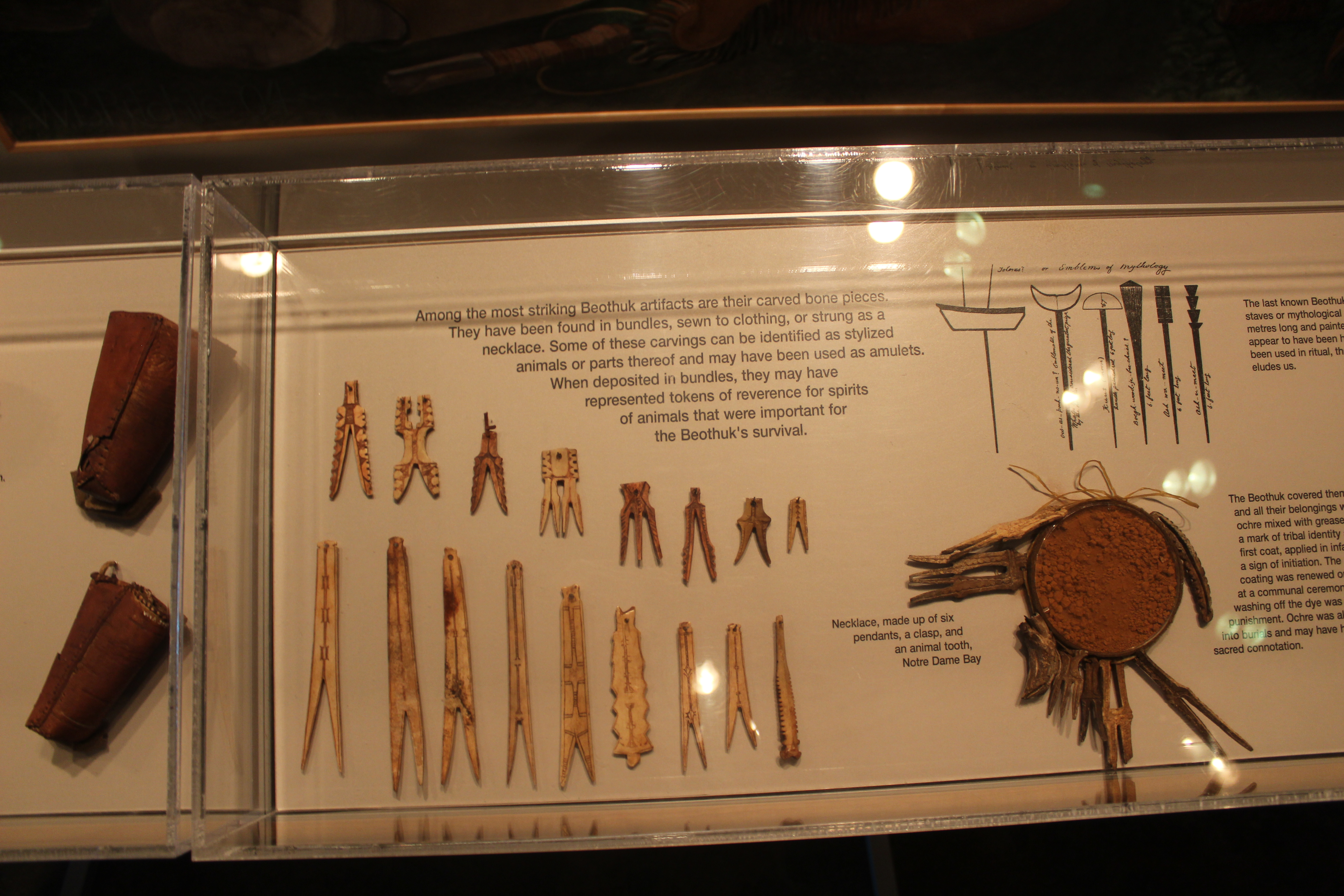
The yellow pointed shape recalls carved bone pieces made by the Beothuk (The Rooms museum)

The design was chosen due to its broad symbolism. The blue (pantone 2955C) represents the waters of the sea, lakes and rivers; the white represents snow and ice; the red (pantone 200C) represents human effort, and the yellow gold (pantone 137C) symbolizes the confidence the people of Newfoundland and Labrador have in themselves and for the future.

The flag design is that of etchings on Beothuk and Innu decorative pendants worn hung from a cord around the neck. Pratt viewed these at the Provincial Museum. With the blue, red and white colours applied, the design has an intentional overall resemblance to the Union Jack, as a reminder of historic connections with the British Isles. The two red (pantone 200C) triangles represent the two areas of the province, Labrador the continental region and Newfoundland the insular region. The gold (pantone 137C) arrow, according to Pratt, points towards a "brighter future"; the arrow becomes a sword, honouring the sacrifices of Newfoundlanders and Labradorians in military service when the flag is displayed as a vertical banner. The red triangles and the gold arrow form a trident, symbolizing the province's association with the fisheries and other resources of and under the sea.

=== Construction sheet ===
Flag of Newfoundland and Labrador construction sheet

== Previous flags ==
=== Newfoundland ensigns ===
Red Ensign

Blue Ensign

The Red Ensign was officially endorsed by King Charles II in 1674; this authorisation recognised it as the ensign of English merchant shipping. Later, during the Victorian era, the flag—with colonial badge—formed the basis as the Colony of Newfoundland's civil ensign. Old oil paintings show red ensigns flying from the topmasts of Grand Banks schooners. While 19th century photographs show red ensigns flown at Moravian mission stations and Hudson's Bay Company trading posts along the Labrador Coast.

In 1904, the British Parliament designated a civil ensign specifically for Newfoundland. The Red and Blue Ensigns with the Great Seal of Newfoundland in the fly were the colony's (later dominion)'s official flags from 1904 until 1931, after which the Union Jack was adopted as Newfoundland's official national flag and the ensigns reserved for shipping and marine identification—the Red Ensign to be flown by merchant shipping while the blue was flown by governmental ships. Neither ensign was immediately formally adopted by the General Assembly of Newfoundland, which sat at the Colonial Building in St. John's, when Newfoundland became a Dominion of the British Empire in 1907. It was not until the Newfoundland National Flag Act of 1931 that the Newfoundland parliament officially adopted the Union Jack as the national flag of Newfoundland and re-affirmed the red and blue ensigns as official flags for marine identification. Between 1907 and 1931, however, the red ensign gained wide enough use, both at sea and on land by civilians and government alike, that it was considered to be the national flag.

The badge in the ensigns consists of Mercury, the god of commerce and merchandise, presenting to Britannia a fisherman who, in a kneeling attitude, is offering the harvest of all the sea. Above the device in a scroll are the Latin words "Terra Nova", and below the motto Hæc Tibi Dona Fero or "These gifts I bring thee". The seal was redesigned by Adelaine Lane, niece of Governor Sir Cavendish Boyle.

=== Union Flag ===
Union Flag

The old flag of Newfoundland was the Union Flag. It was legally adopted in 1931 and used as Newfoundland's national flag until confederation with Canada in 1949. It was then readapted as the official provincial flag in 1949 and used officially until 1980. The Newfoundland and Labrador branches of the Royal Canadian Legion to this day display the Union Flag along with the current Newfoundland and Labrador provincial and national (Canada maple leaf) flags.

== See also ==
- Newfoundland Tricolour
- Flag of Labrador
- Flag of Franco-Newfoundlanders
- Flag of Nunatsiavut
- Symbols of Newfoundland and Labrador
- Coat of arms of Newfoundland and Labrador
