= Ode to Labrador =

Regional anthem of Labrador

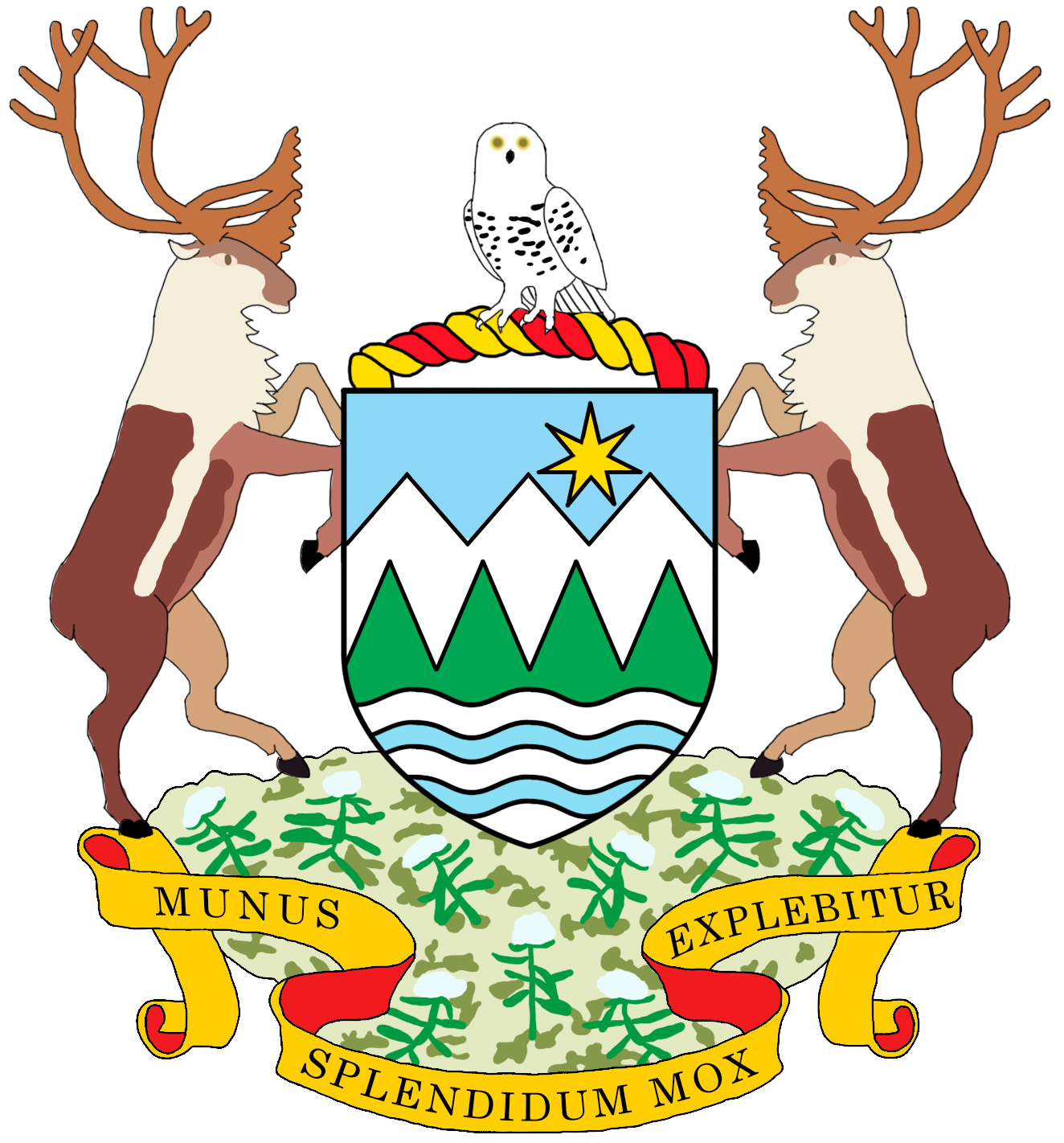
- Regional anthem of Labrador
- Lyrics: Harry Paddon, 1927
- Music: Lauriger Horatius
- Adopted: 1927

Audio sample
- Ode to Labrador: file; help

"Ode to Labrador" is the regional anthem of Labrador, a constituent region of the province of Newfoundland and Labrador, Canada.

== History ==
Written by Dr. Harry Paddon in 1927, it is generally sung to the melody of "O Tannenbaum", although alternate melodies have been proposed. The Ode constitutes "the first major, symbolic declaration of Labradorean solidarity".

Paddon was sent to Labrador by the London board of health, and this song is analyzed as his declaration of allegiance to his fellow adopted countrymen and women, and sought to aid in their political mobilization with the Ode. The symbolic significance of the Ode is further bolstered by the fact that Labrador's definitive boundaries were only determined that very same year.

== Lyrics ==
Lyrics

Dear land of mountains, woods and snow,
Labrador, our Labrador.
God's noble gift to us below,
Labrador, our Labrador.
Thy proud resources waiting still,
Their splendid task will soon fulfil,
Obedient to thy Maker's will,
Labrador, our Labrador.

Thy stately forests soon shall ring,
Labrador, our Labrador.
Responsive to the woodsman's swing,
Labrador, our Labrador.
And mighty floods that long remained,
Their raging fury unrestrained,
Shall serve the purpose God ordained,
Labrador, our Labrador.

We love to climb thy mountains steep,
Labrador, our Labrador.
And paddle on thy waters deep,
Labrador, our Labrador.
Our snowshoes scar thy trackless plains,
We seek no city streets nor lanes,
We are thy sons while life remains,
Labrador, our Labrador.

== See also ==
- Ode to Newfoundland
- Symbols of Newfoundland and Labrador
