= Monarchy in Newfoundland and Labrador =

Function of the Canadian monarchy in Newfoundland and Labrador

King in Right of Newfoundland and Labrador
- Provincial
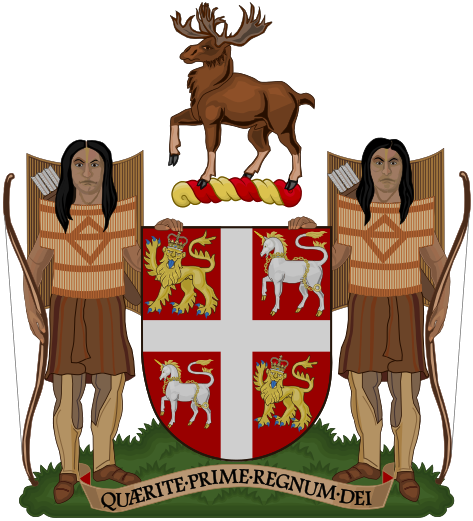
- Coat of arms of Newfoundland and Labrador

Incumbent
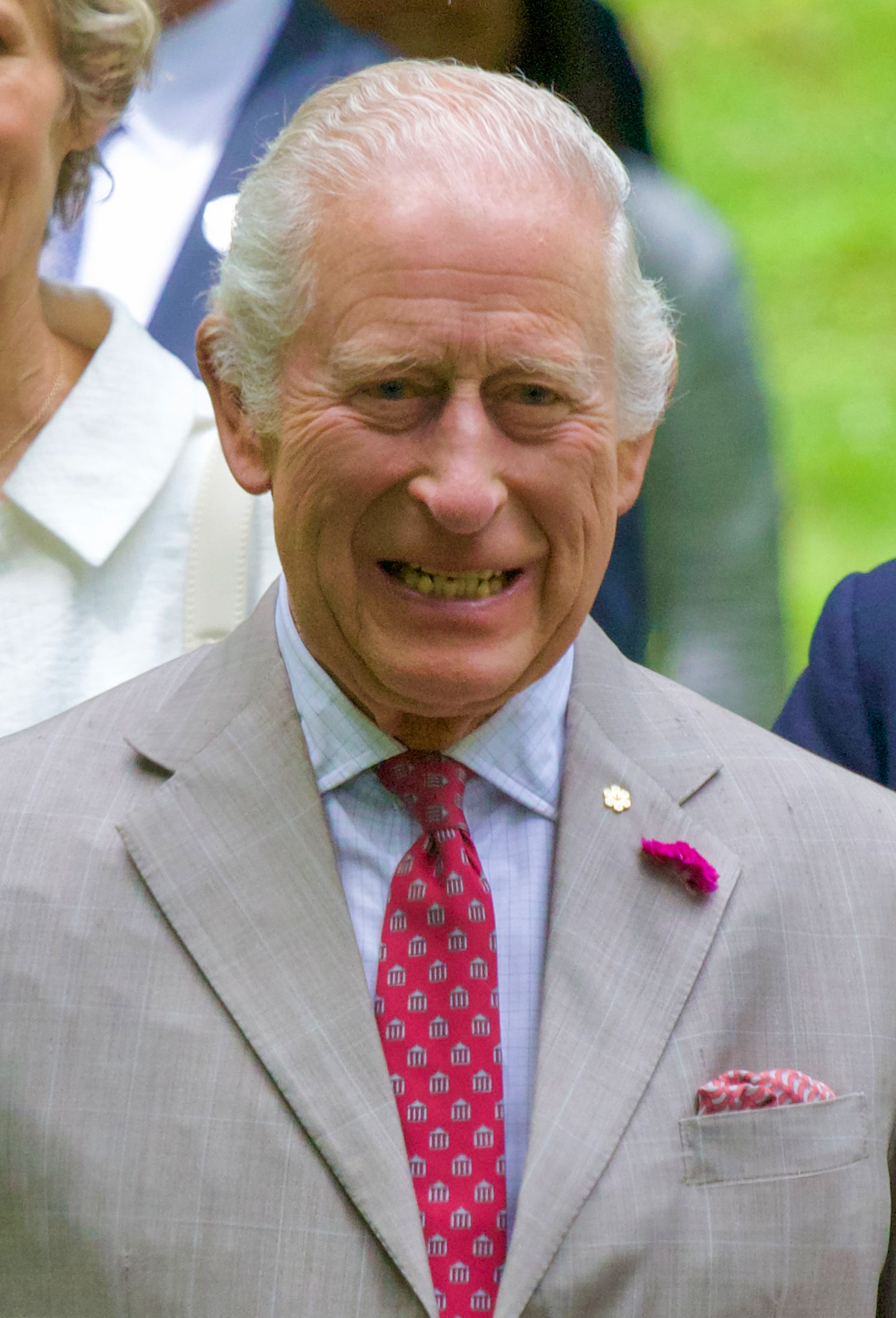
- Charles III; King of Canada since 8 September 2022

Details
- Style: His Majesty
- First monarch: George VI
- Formed: 31 March 1949

By the arrangements of the Canadian federation, the Canadian monarchy operates in Newfoundland and Labrador as the core of the province's Westminster-style parliamentary democracy. As such, the Crown within Newfoundland and Labrador's jurisdiction is referred to as the Crown in Right of Newfoundland and Labrador, His Majesty in Right of Newfoundland and Labrador, or the King in Right of Newfoundland and Labrador. The Constitution Act, 1867, however, leaves many royal duties in the province specifically assigned to the sovereign's viceroy, the lieutenant governor of Newfoundland and Labrador, whose direct participation in governance is limited by the conventional stipulations of constitutional monarchy.

== Constitutional role ==
The role of the Crown is both legal and practical; it functions in Newfoundland and Labrador in the same way it does in all of Canada's other provinces, being the centre of a constitutional construct in which the institutions of government acting under the sovereign's authority share the power of the whole. It is thus the foundation of the executive, legislative, and judicial branches of the province's government. The Canadian monarch—since 8 September 2022, King Charles III—is represented and his duties carried out by the lieutenant governor of Newfoundland and Labrador, whose direct participation in governance is limited by the conventional stipulations of constitutional monarchy, with most related powers entrusted for exercise by the elected parliamentarians, the ministers of the Crown generally drawn from among them, and the judges and justices of the peace. The Crown today primarily functions as a guarantor of continuous and stable governance and a nonpartisan safeguard against the abuse of power.

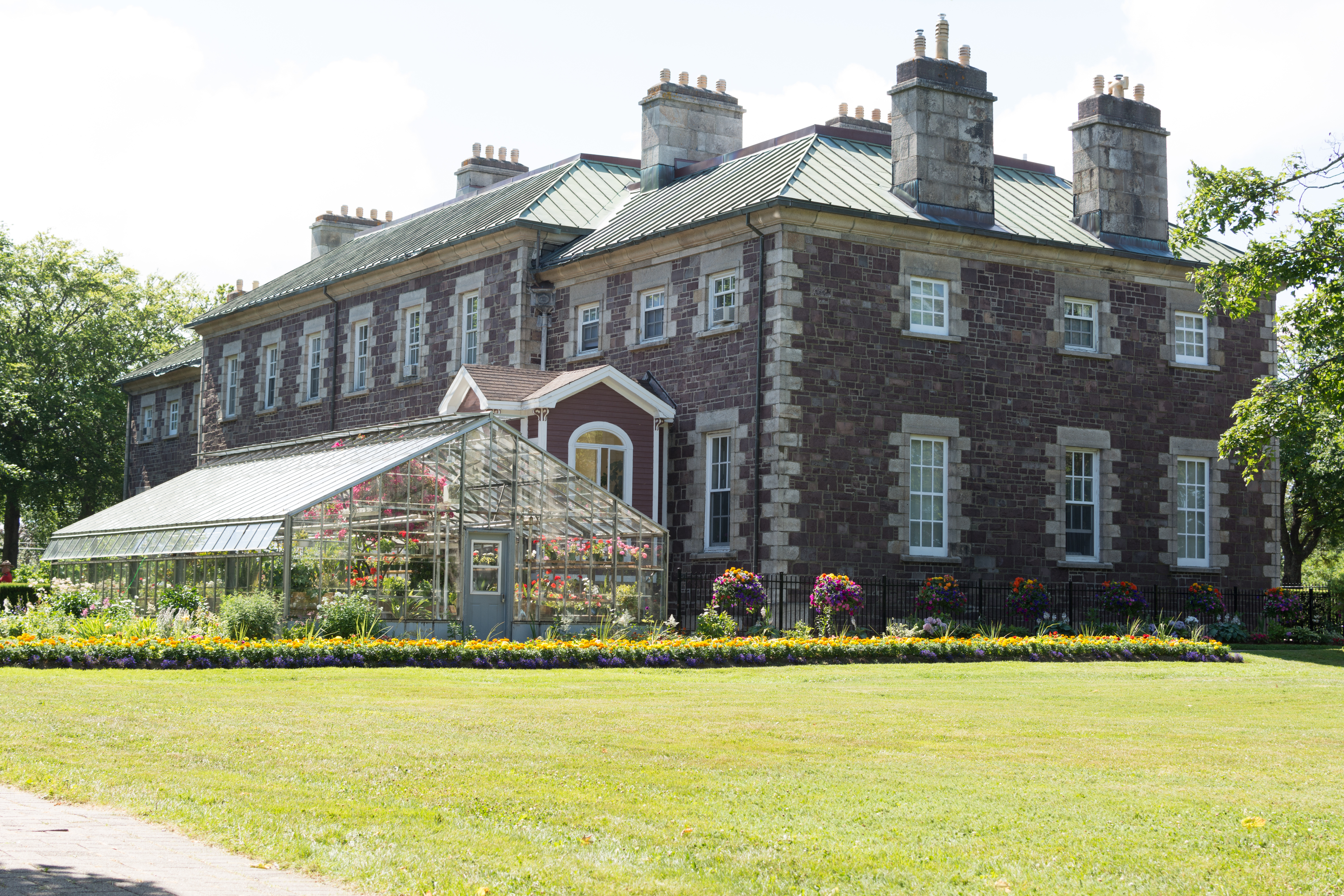
Government House in St. John's

This arrangement began with the granting in 1949 of royal assent to the Newfoundland Act and continued an unbroken line of monarchical government extending back to the late 15th century. However, though it has a separate government headed by the King, as a province, Newfoundland and Labrador is not itself a kingdom.

Government House in St. John's is owned by the sovereign in his capacity as King in Right of Newfoundland and Labrador and is used as an official residence by the lieutenant governor, and the sovereign when in Newfoundland and Labrador.

== Royal associations ==
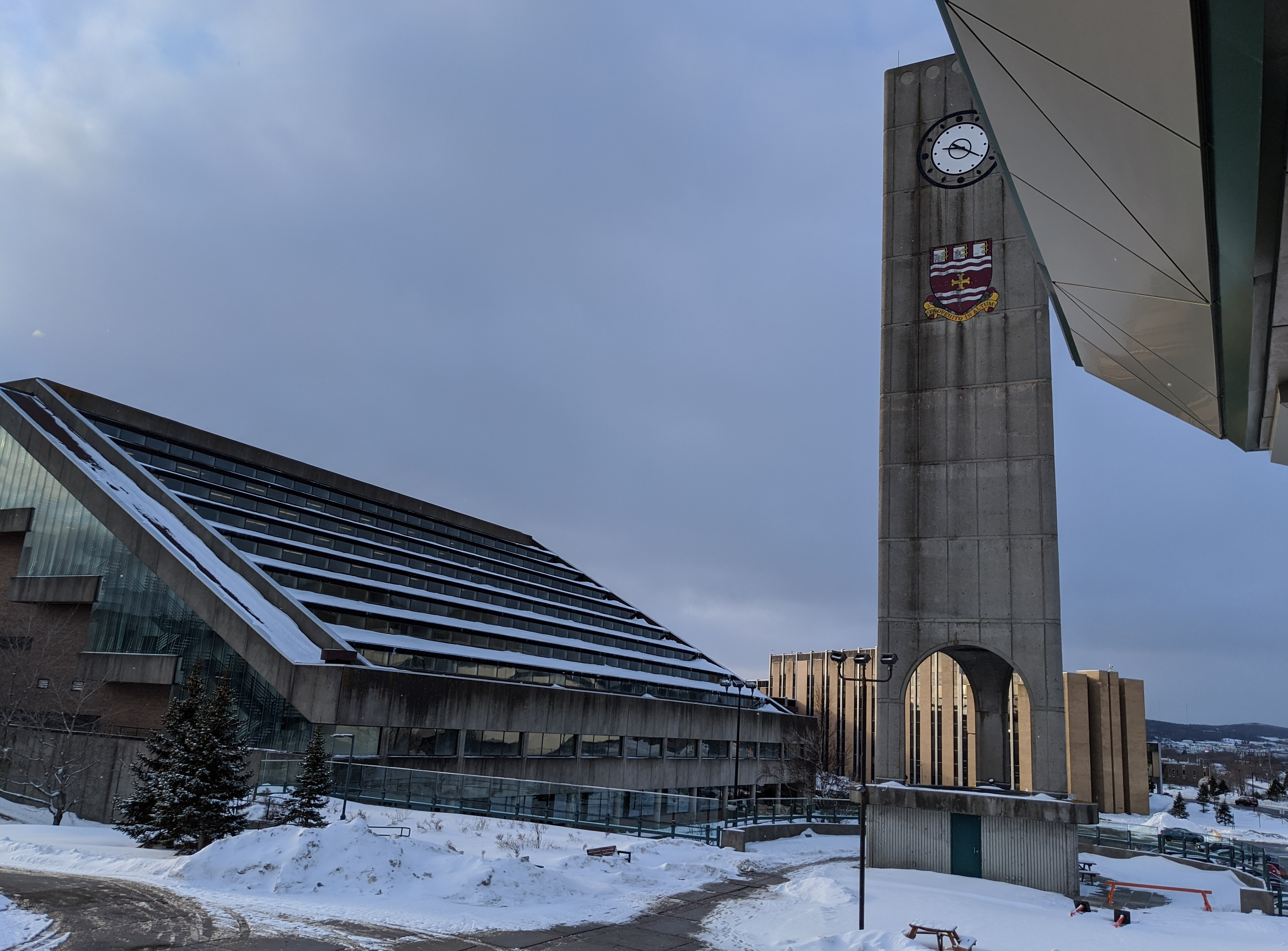
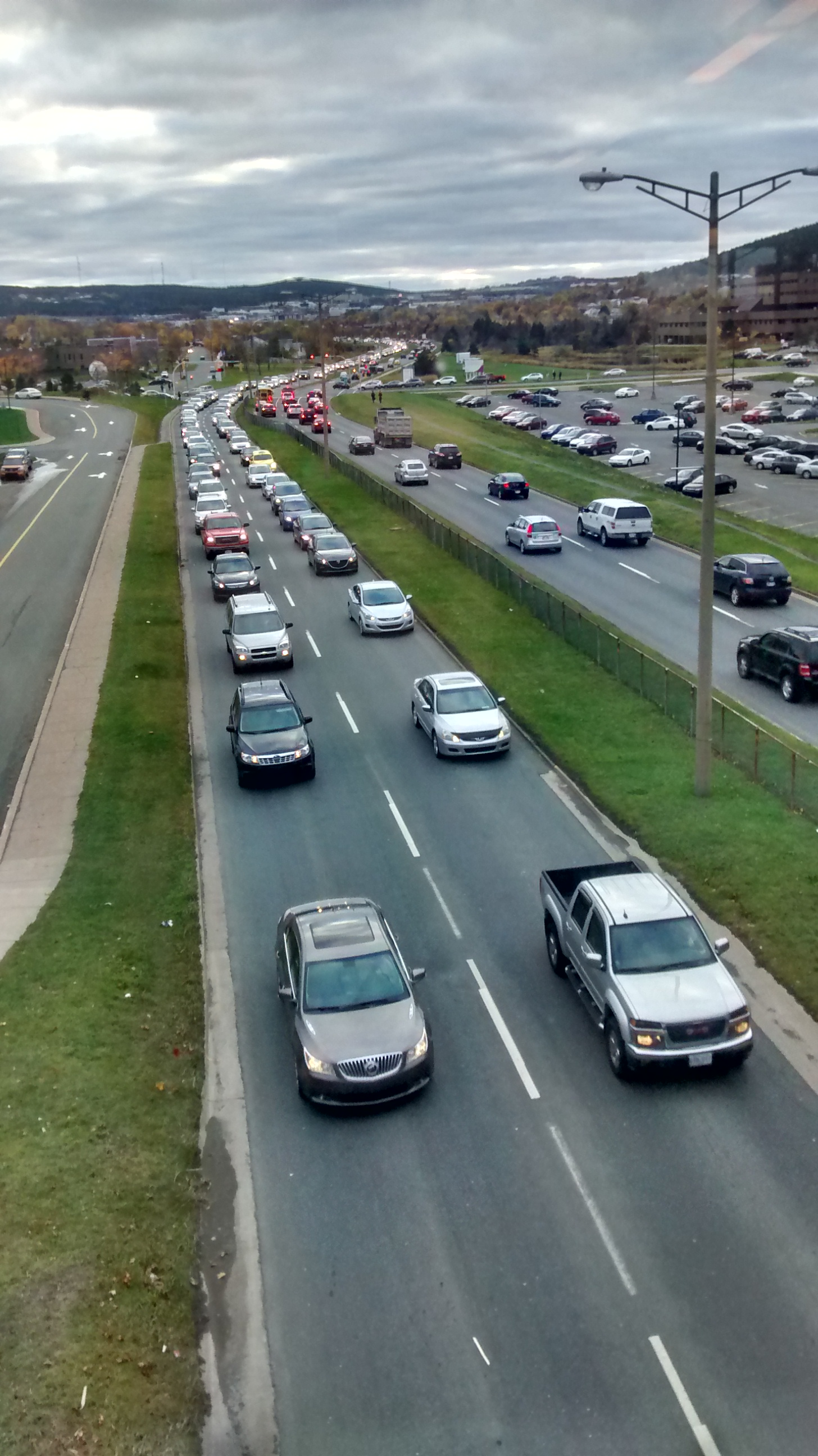
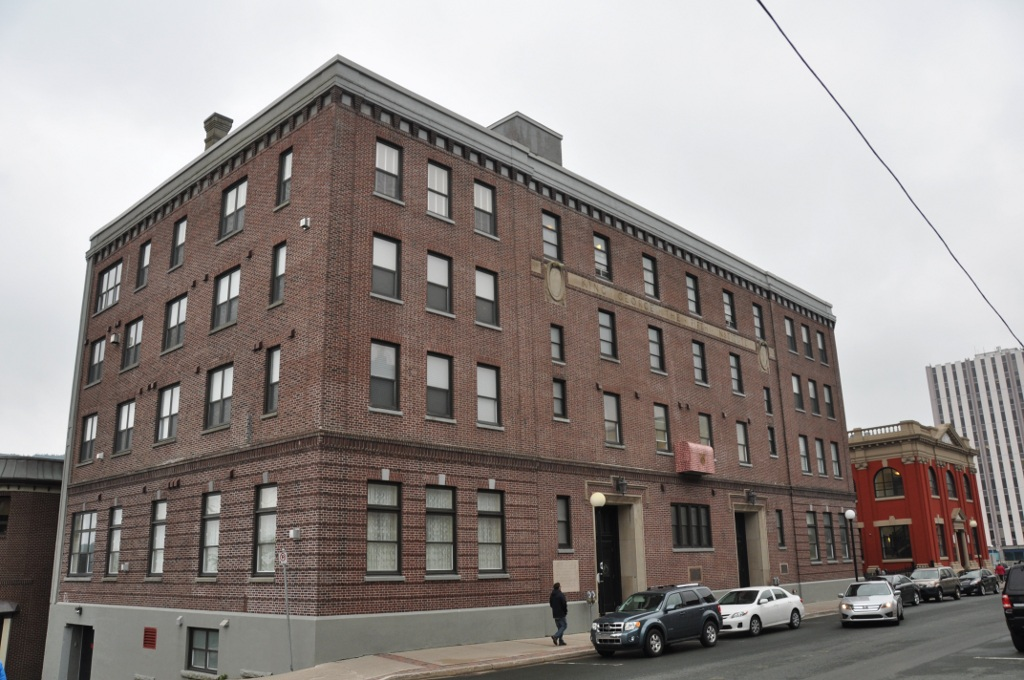
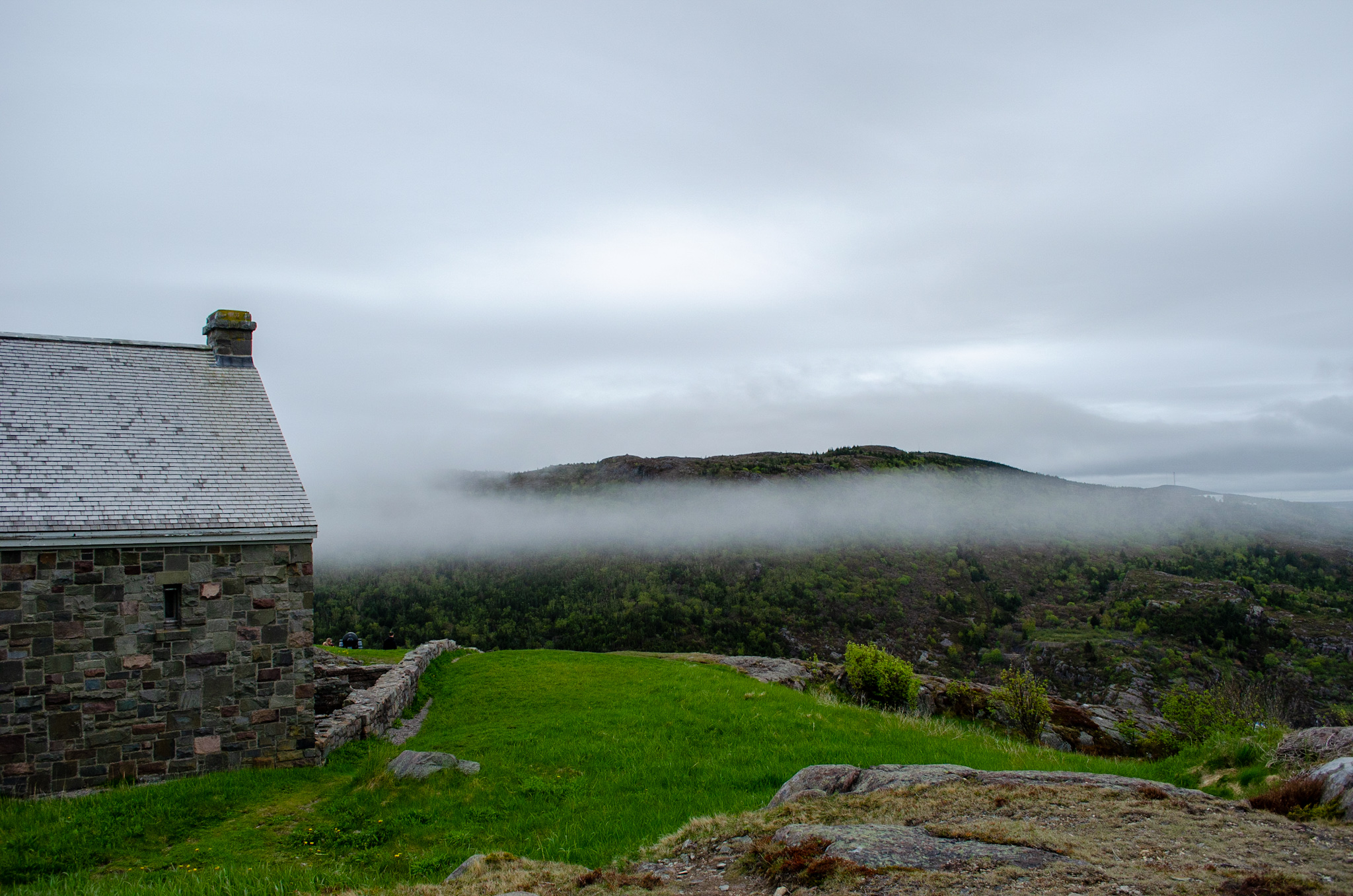
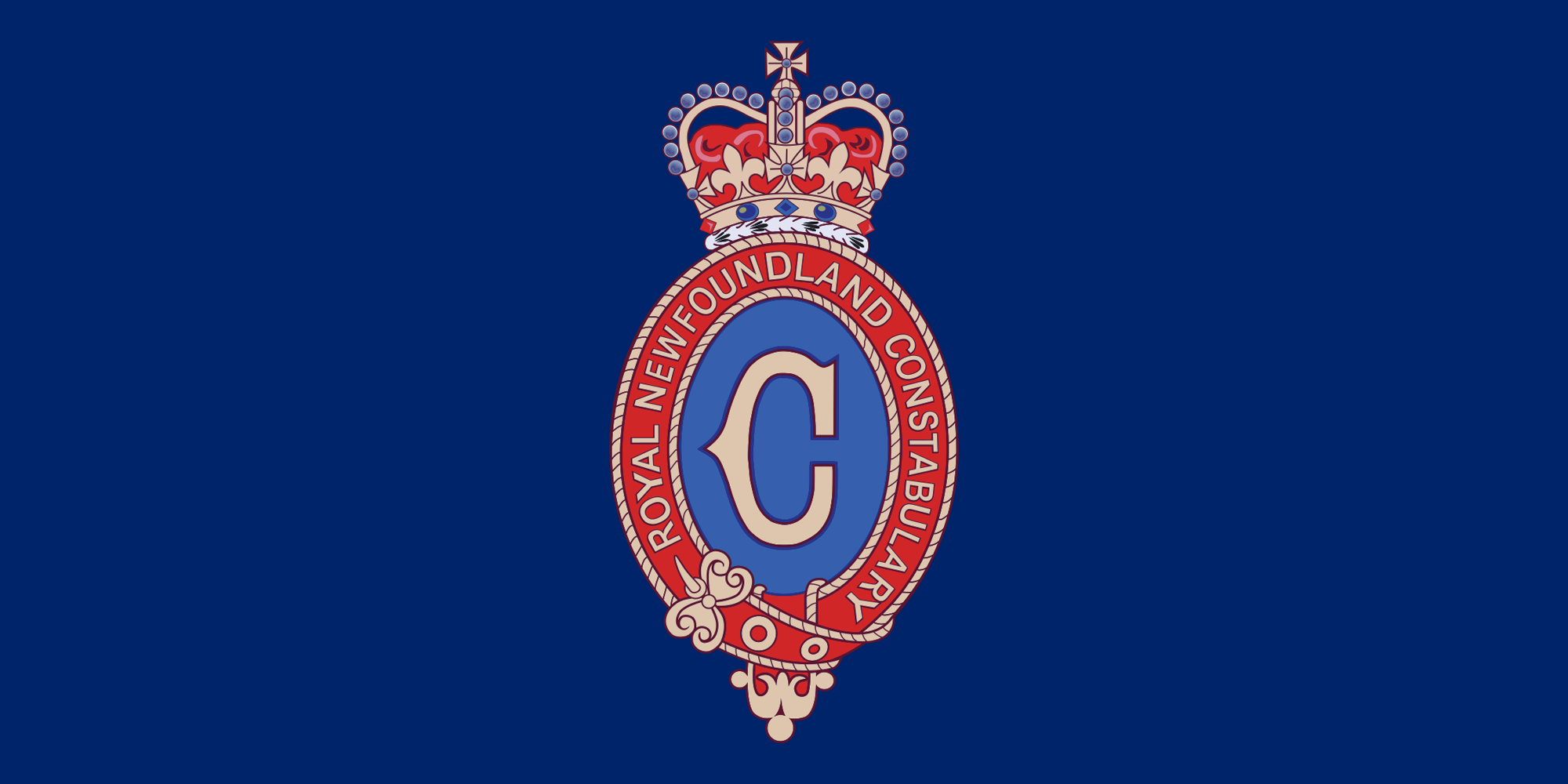
(Clockwise from top) The Queen Elizabeth II Library, so named for Queen Elizabeth II; the King George V Building, named for King George V; flag of the Royal Newfoundland Constabulary; the Queen's Battery Barracks, named for Queen Victoria; Prince Philip Drive, named in honour of Prince Philip, Duke of Edinburgh

Those in the royal family perform ceremonial duties when on a tour of the province; the royal persons do not receive any personal income for their service, only the costs associated with the exercise of these obligations are funded by both the Canadian and Newfoundland and Labrador Crowns in their respective councils. Monuments around Newfoundland and Labrador mark some of those visits, while others honour a royal personage or event. Further, Newfoundland and Labrador's monarchical status is illustrated by royal names applied regions, communities, schools, and buildings, many of which may also have a specific history with a member or members of the royal family. Associations also exist between the Crown and many private organizations within the province; these may have been founded by a royal charter, received a royal prefix, and/or been honoured with the patronage of a member of the royal family. Examples include the Royal Newfoundland Constabulary, which received its royal prefix from Queen Elizabeth II in 1979, and the Royal St. John's Regatta, which had the Queen as its patron and received its royal prefix from her in 1993.

The main symbol of the monarchy is the sovereign himself, his image (in portrait or effigy) thus being used to signify government authority. A royal cypher or crown may also illustrate the monarchy as the locus of authority, without referring to any specific monarch. Further, though the monarch does not form a part of the constitutions of Newfoundland and Labrador's honours, they do stem from the Crown as the fount of honour and, so, bear on the insignia symbols of the sovereign.

== History ==
=== Establishment of the Crown in Newfoundland ===
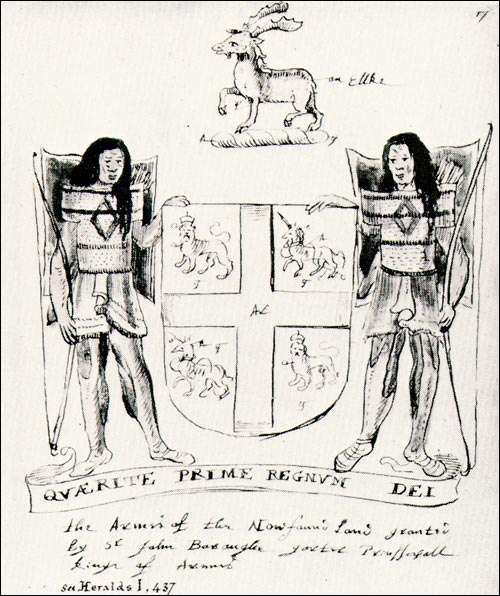
The coat of arms granted to David Kirke by Sir John Borough, Garter Principal King of Arms, by command of King Charles I in 1637

By commission under the royal prerogative of Queen Elizabeth I, Sir Humphrey Gilbert claimed the island of Newfoundland on 5 August 1583. By the mid-1660s, however, the French Crown had also laid claim to nearly half of the same area. Disputes over the island were ended as the French kings ceded Terre Neuve to the British Crown via the Treaty of Utrecht in 1713 and later the Treaty of Paris in 1763, in-between which, in 1729, the Royal Newfoundland Constabulary was established.

In 1615, Richard Whitbourne was sent to Newfoundland to oversee the fisheries and wrote A Discourse and Discovery of Newfoundland to induce Englishmen to settle the island. King James VI and I approved of the book so highly that he ordered copies sent to every parish in England.

David Kirke, an adventurer, privateer, and friend of King Charles I, was installed by the King as proprietary governor in 1638, also granting Kirke a coat of arms, which, in a twist of fate, are today the arms of King Charles III in Right of Newfoundland and Labrador. The year prior, Kirke and his partners had also been given, by way of a royal charter from Charles, co-proprietorship of the entire island.

When the English Civil War between the King and parliament in England ended in 1651 with Charles I's execution, Kirke lost the protection of the Crown and Newfoundland was taken by the Commonwealth of England, headed by Oliver Cromwell. Kirke died in prison in 1654, awaiting trial over his title to the lands around Ferryland. John Treworgie thereafter served as governor of Newfoundland until the restoration of the English monarchy in 1660. The Lord Baltimore was granted the Avalon Peninsula by royal patent from King Charles II, but never took up residence. Lady Kirke, the wife of David's brother, Sir Lewis Kirke, petitioned the King to make David's son, George Kirke, the governor of Newfoundland; an arrangement that had been suggested by Newfoundlanders. But, Charles demurred from appointing a resident governor.

=== Royalty in the colony ===
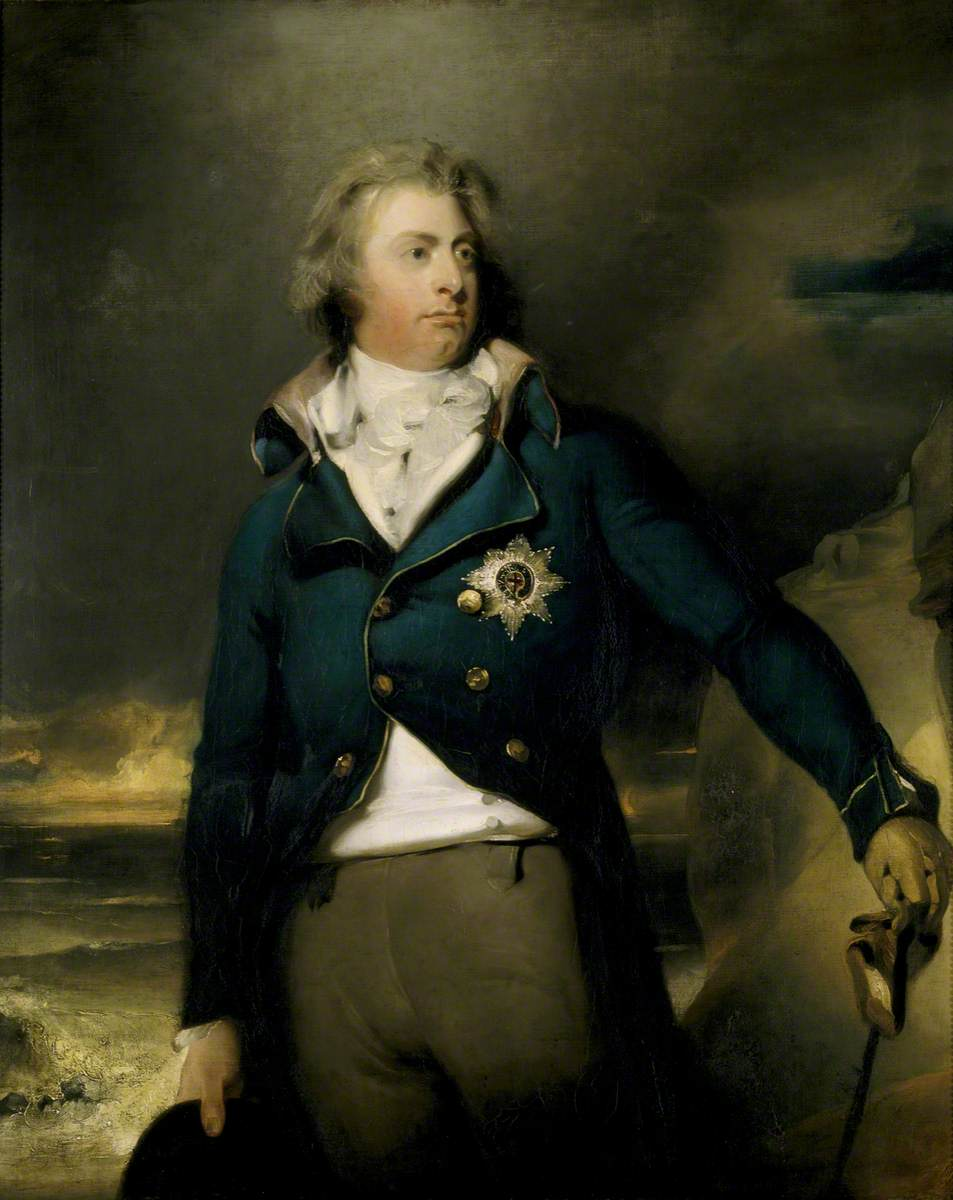
Prince William Henry c. 1790

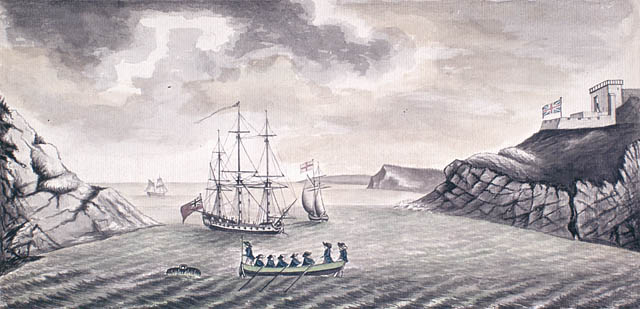
HMS Pegasus in St. John's harbour, under the command of Prince William Henry

As an officer in the Royal Navy, in command of HMS Pegasus, Prince William Henry (later King William IV) was the first member of the royal family to visit the Newfoundland Colony, arriving on 10 April 1786. His first impressions of the land were not positive: he stated of St John's, "truly deplorable [...] a most dreadful, inhospitable, and barren country"; though, he later changed his opinion after meeting the local women, commenting on the region's "inexhaustible supply of women of the most obliging kind."

While in Newfoundland, William found himself involved in civil affairs, in addition to naval ones, as there were no permanent civil authorities on the island and the Prince was the senior naval officer in the colony. As such, the Prince broke up a riot in Placentia, presided over a court, and commissioned the construction of St. Luke's Anglican Church in Newtown, toward which he contributed his own money, as well as a silver communion set, consisting of a chalice, paten, plate, and flagon, all of which are still in the church's possession. On 21 August 1786, he celebrated his 21st birthday on his ship in the waters off Newfoundland. William wrote to his father, King George III,

"During the last fortnight of our stay at Placentia, I read divine service in the courthouse for an example to the magistrates to perform that duty every Sunday 'til the arrival of the missionary from England. I twice led prayers and my congregation consisted of all the Protestants and many of the Catholicks [sic]."

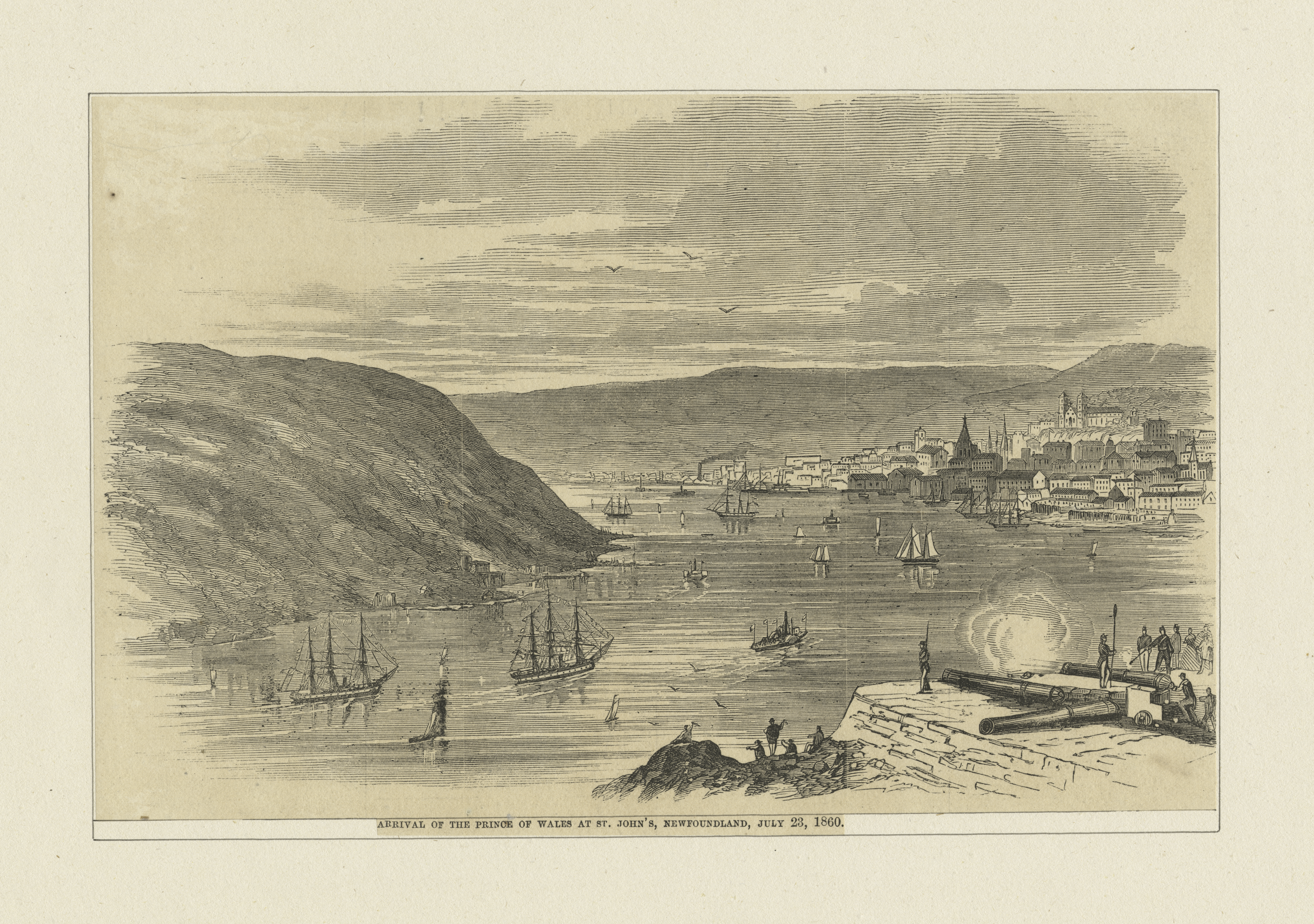
The arrival of Prince Albert Edward in St. John's harbour, aboard HMS Hero, July 1860

Thirty-five years after the colony's status was elevated to that of a province of the Crown, Queen Victoria's eldest son and the grand-nephew of King William IV, Prince Albert Edward (the future King Edward VII) arrived at Newfoundland on 24 July 1860, aboard HMS Hero, receiving the standard welcome from Governor Alexander Bannerman, in the form of an official address, followed by a reply from the Prince. In the evening, there was a formal ball held in Albert Edward's honour. While on the island, the Prince took in the St. John's Regatta, offering £100 to the winner, and was gifted a Newfoundland dog, on behalf of Newfoundlanders.

=== The early 20th century ===
Prince George (later King George V) and Princess Mary (later Queen Mary), with Mary's brother, Prince Alexander (later a governor general of Canada), visited Newfoundland in 1901 (George's second visit to the island), arriving at St. John's on 25 October, aboard HMS Ophir, escorted by HMS Crescent, HMS Niobe, HMS Proserpine, and HMS Diadem. The ships were greeted by a flotilla of thousands of decorated vessels; of the arrival, M. Harvey wrote, "from that moment until the departure of the Ophir, it was one continuous carnival." This was the royal party's last port on an eight month long tour of the British Empire and immediately followed a coast-to-coast-and-back-again tour of Canada.

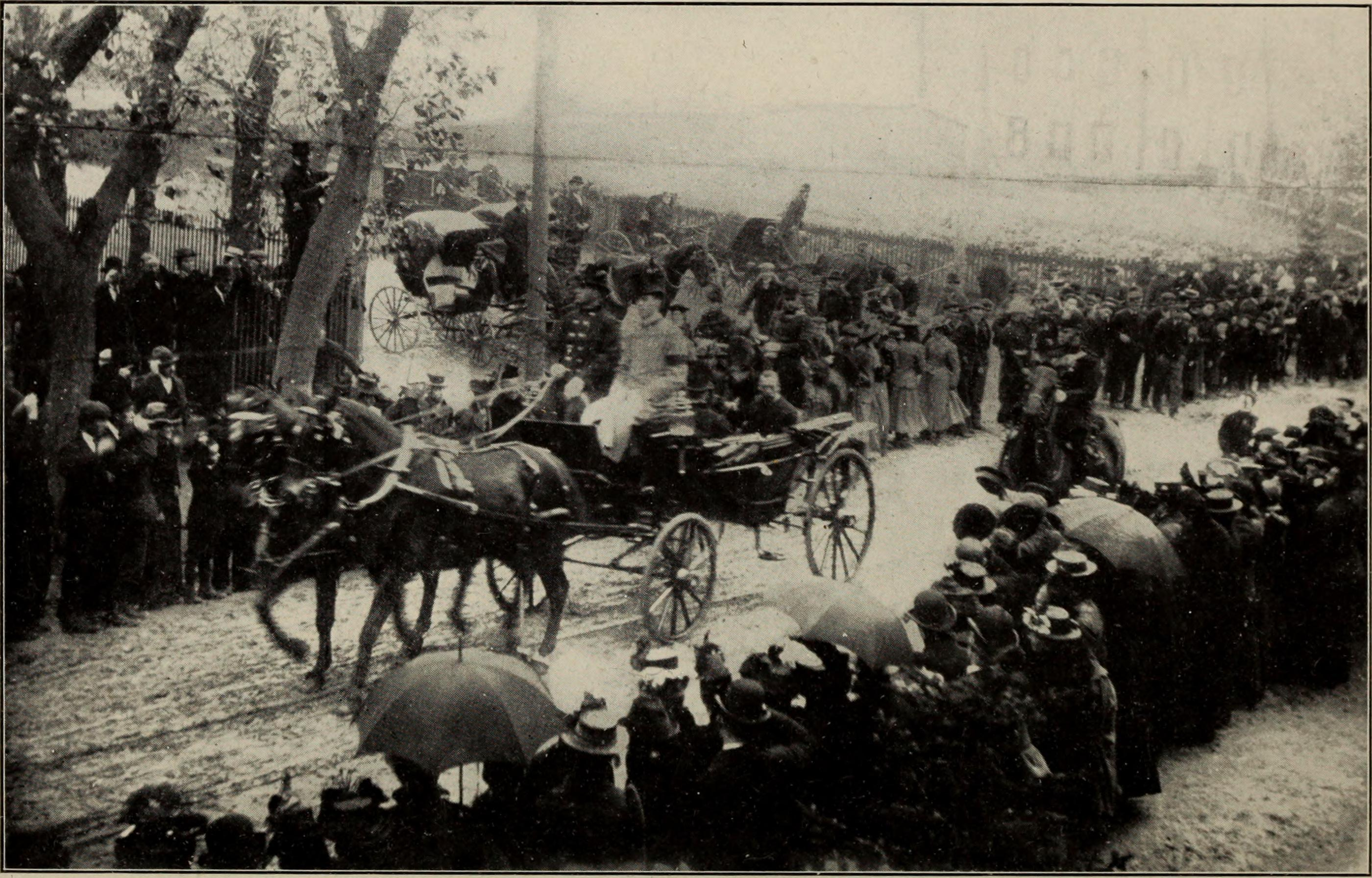
Prince George (later King George V) and Princess Mary (later Queen Mary) ride by carriage from Government House to the courthouse, St. John's, 26 October 1901

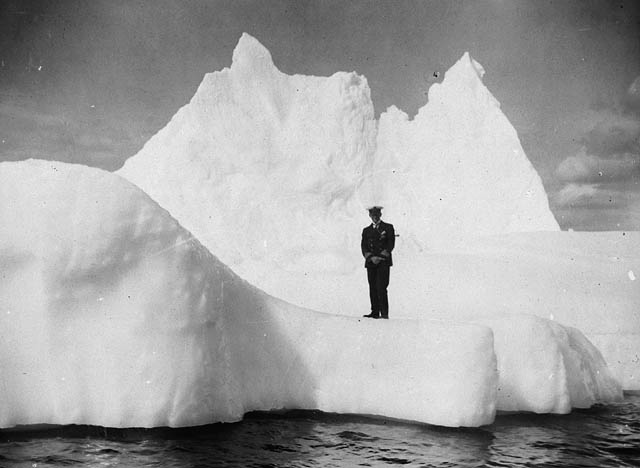
Prince Edward (later King Edward VIII) stands on an iceberg in Conception Bay, 12 August 1919

The Prince and Princess' first event in Newfoundland was hosting a formal dinner for Governor Cavendish Boyle and his cabinet on board Ophir. The following morning, the royal party landed and toured St. John's by carriage, stopping at Government House, to meet again with the Governor and his ministers; the then-new courthouse, where the Duke laid the cornerstone; and the Prince's Rink, to hear 6,000 schoolchildren sing a specially-composed anthem. There, echoing the visit of George's father, King Edward VII, in 1860, the royal couple were given a nine-month old Newfoundland dog named Bouncer, to pass on to their then-seven year old son, Prince Edward (later King Edward VIII). The Duke and Duchess then returned to Government House for a reception in the throne room.

Following the Imperial Conference in 1907, at which it was resolved to confer dominion status on all self-governing colonies in attendance, King Edward VII, on the advice of his imperial Privy Council in London, made Newfoundland a Dominion of the British Empire. Seven years later, the country, with the United Kingdom's declaration of war on Germany, entered the First World War and, in recognition for its service with distinction in several battles, the 1st Newfoundland Regiment was granted the prefix royal from the King, becoming the Royal Newfoundland Regiment

George and Mary's other son, Prince Albert (later King George VI), arrived in Newfoundland in 1913, while serving as a midshipman aboard the Royal Navy cruiser HMS Cumberland, spending some leisure time salmon fishing. His uncle, Prince Arthur, Duke of Connaught and Strathearn, visited the island the following year, while he was serving as governor general of Canada.

Prince Edward visited Topsail on 5 August 1919, aboard HMS Renown, which anchored in Conception Bay because the ship had been deemed too large to turn around in St. John's Harbour. When he stepped ashore, the Prince received "not a second glance from the locals, who [had] no idea who he [was]". After a few hours touring the town, Edward travelled on to St John's for formal events and took in a race at the Royal St. John's Regatta. The Prince departed Newfoundland for Canada on HMS Dauntless.

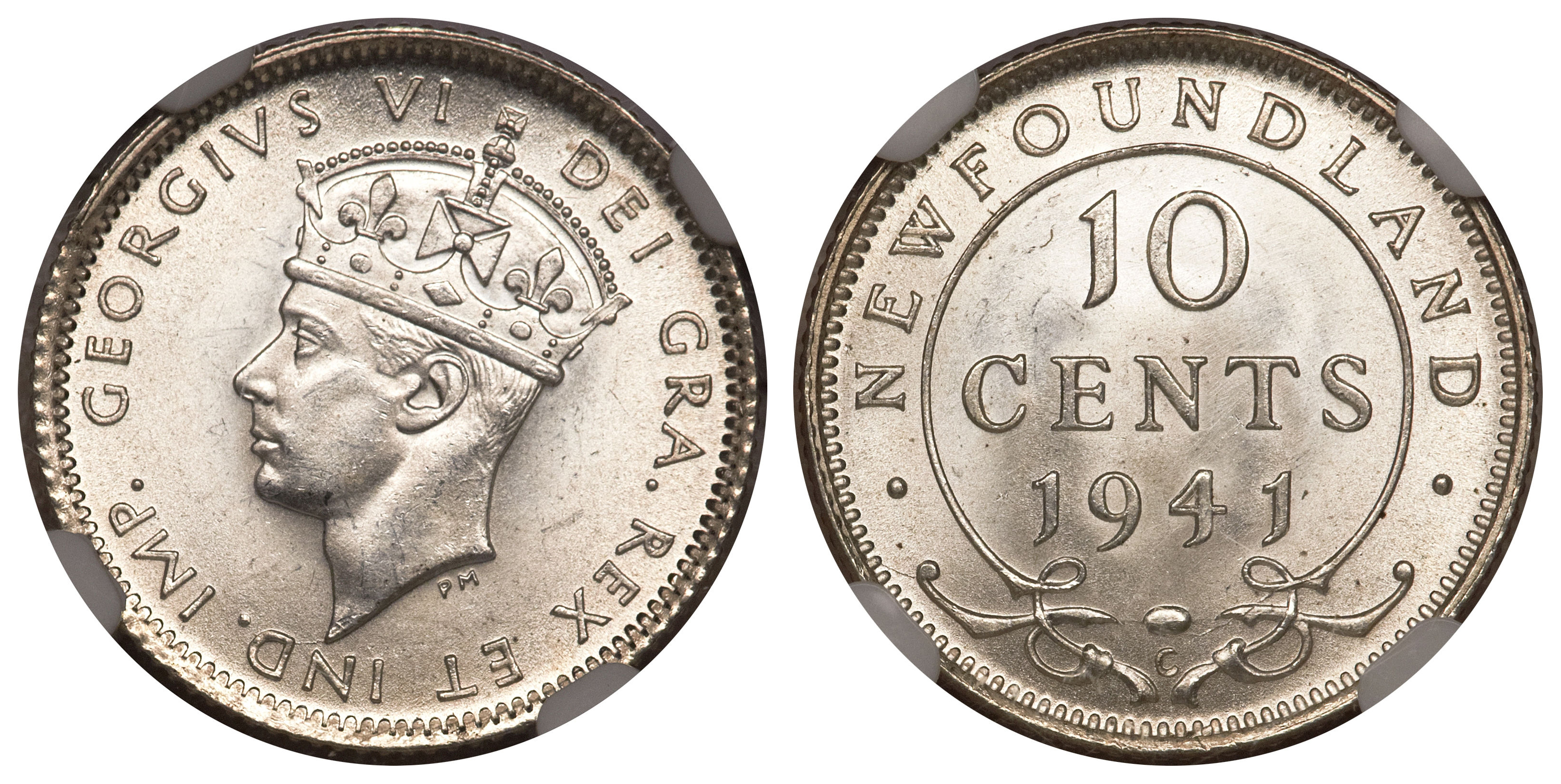
A Newfoundland 10-cent coin from 1941, showing the effigy of King George VI

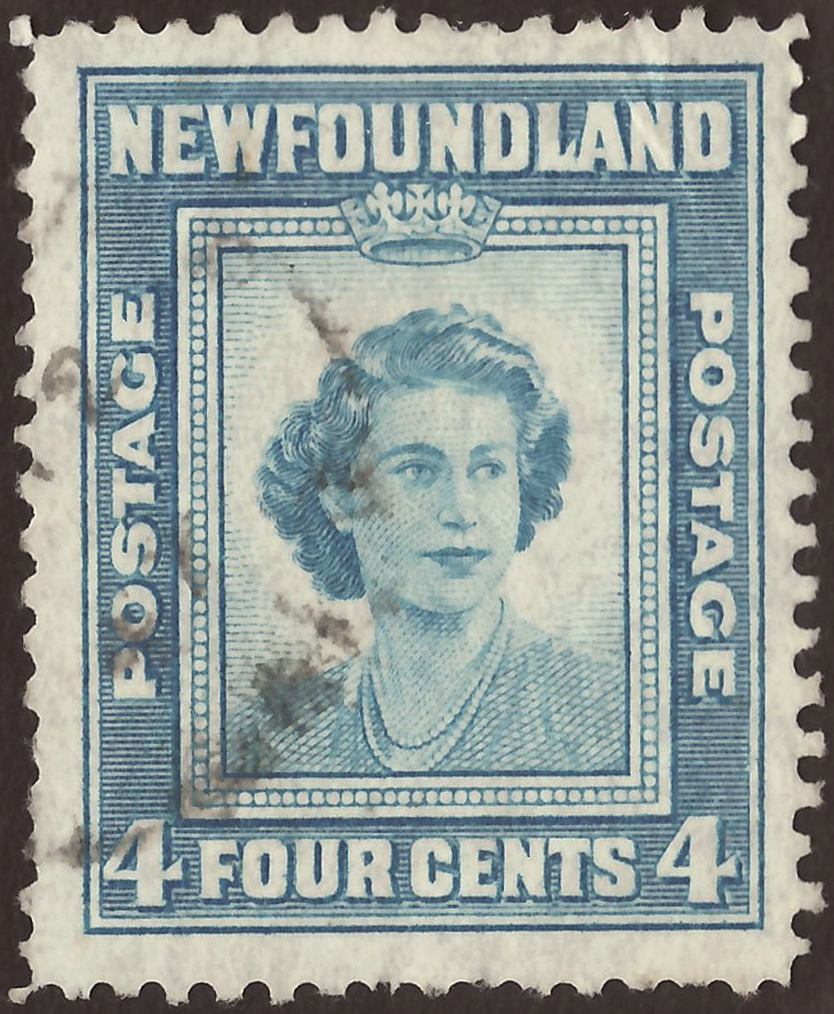
A 1947 Newfoundland stamp with the image of Princess Elizabeth

After the Balfour Declaration of 1926 established that the Dominions were "autonomous communities within the British Empire, equal in status, in no way subordinate one to another in any aspect of their domestic or external affairs", Newfoundland gave its assent to the enactment of Statute of Westminster 1931. With that, the monarchy in Newfoundland ceased to be an exclusively British institution and became a Newfounlandian, or "domesticated", establishment, the sovereign's role as monarch of Newfoundland becoming distinct from his position as monarch of any other realm and only Newfoundlandian ministers of the Crown, thereafter, being able to advise the sovereign on any and all matters of the Newfoundland state. However, only three years later, the country suspended its legislature and self-governing status and the Commission of Government took control, putting Newfoundland under the authority of a governor who reported to the British Cabinet that adivised the monarch of the UK. This left Newfoundland as a dominion in name only.

King George VI and Queen Elizabeth visited Newfoundland on 17 June 1939 and, accompanied by Governor Sir Humphrey Walwyn, undertook an hour-long drive from Conception Bay to St. John's and attended a garden party and other official events. The city's population of 50,000 doubled, as visitors came in to see the royal couple; though, a "lack of cheering and of visible enthusiasm” in the crowd was noted; the country remained downtrodden and demoralized after the loss of self-government and the Great Depression. Still, to bid the King and Queen farewell, the residents of St John's built a large bonfire on Signal Hill, visible to the monarch and his consort as they sailed away on the Canadian Pacific liner RMS Empress of Britain.

=== Confederation ===
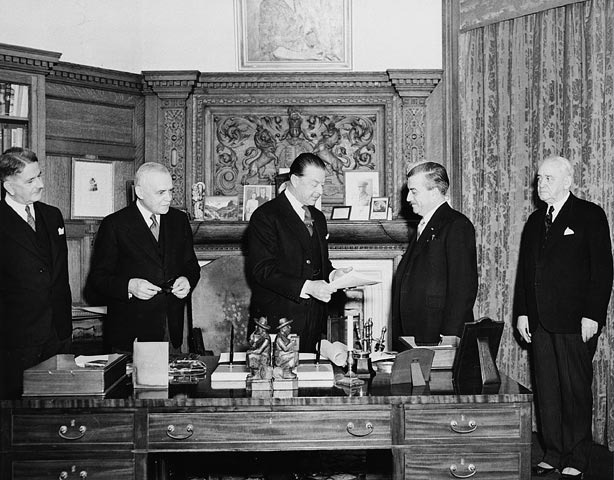
Governor General the Earl Alexander of Tunis receives for royal assent the bill concerning the terms of the union of Newfoundland with Canada, at Rideau Hall, Ottawa, 1949

Following two referendums in 1948, the island joined Canadian Confederation the next year, making it the only province to do so by authority of the Canadian monarch.

Since Confederation, there have been a number of royal visits to the province. Some notable visits have included Princess Mary, Princess Royal, marking in 1964 the 50th anniversary of the departure of the first contingent of the Royal Newfoundland Regiment from St. John's to the battlefields of the First World War; Prince Charles, Prince of Wales, along with his wife Diana, Princess of Wales, visiting Newfoundland in 1983 to mark the 400th anniversary of the island becoming an English, and later British, colony; and, during her 1997 tour of Canada, Queen Elizabeth II, along with her husband, Prince Philip, Duke of Edinburgh, travelling to Bonavista to see the arrival of the Matthew, as part of the re-enactment of John Cabot's arrival on the island 500 years before.

== See also ==
- Symbols of Newfoundland and Labrador
- Monarchy
