= Harry Paddon =

British doctor and medical missionary in Canada

Henry Locke Paddon
- Born: August 9, 1881; Thornton Heath, England
- Died: January 1, 1939 (aged 57); Dominion of Newfoundland
- Education: University College, Oxford; St Thomas's Hospital
- Occupations: Doctor, medical missionary
- Known for: Medical work in Labrador; author of "Ode to Labrador"
- Spouse: Mina Gilchrist

Henry Locke Paddon (9 August 1881 – 1939) was a British doctor and medical missionary in Canada and Newfoundland.

== Life ==
Paddon was the son of Henry Wadham Locke Paddon (1839–1933) and his wife Catherine Van Sommer; his father was son of the Rev. (Thomas) Henry Paddon and his wife Anne Locke, a daughter of Wadham Locke. He was born in Thornton Heath on 9 August 1881. There were four children in the family: their mother died four days after his birth, of what was known as milk fever (a postpartum infection). For a period after her death they were brought up by their paternal grandparents, the Paddons. In 1883, however, their father suffered a breakdown that saw him permanently confined to an asylum. They were then fostered by their maternal grandparents, the Van Sommers, in Wimbledon Park: first the two eldest girls moved there in 1883, and then Harry and his other sister joined them in 1888, having stayed with the Paddons in Eastbourne lodgings (Henry Paddon died in 1887).

Paddon was educated at Woodbridge Grammar School, and Repton School under William Mordaunt Furneaux. He entered University College, Oxford in 1900; his grandfather James Van Sommer died in 1901. A troubled student, he graduated in 1906. Through the Fishermen's Mission (RNMDSF), he encountered again Wilfred Grenfell, who had visited Repton. He studied at St Thomas's Hospital, qualifying in early 1911, and taking a position at the Guest Hospital in the Midlands.

In 1912 Paddon moved to the hospital at Indian Harbour, Labrador founded by Grenfell, for the RNMDSF. He also took on duties at Lake Melville. He married Mina Gilchrist, a nurse from New Brunswick, in 1913. In 1915 he moved to the hospital at North West River. In 1924 the hospital burned down: Paddon saw it rebuilt in a matter of months. He addressed malnutrition in the local population.

In 1927, Paddon wrote the Ode to Labrador, which would eventually be adopted as regional anthem.

Paddon had a better relationship with Nain's Moravian mission than Grenfell, and was in 1930 able to bring a medical cruise in the Maraval there. His preoccupations included tuberculosis and education. He died in 1939 of a bacterial infection.
