= Government House (Newfoundland and Labrador) =

Official residence of the Lieutenant-Governor of Newfoundland and Labrador

- Aerial view of Government House in 2026

General information
- Architectural style: Georgian
- Location: 50 Military Road; St. John's, Newfoundland and Labrador, Canada
- Coordinates: 47.572053°N 52.704878°W
- Current tenants: Lieutenant Governor of Newfoundland and Labrador
- Construction started: 1827
- Cost: £38,000
- Client: The King of the United Kingdom of Great Britain and Ireland (George IV)
- Owner: The King in Right of Newfoundland (Charles III)

Technical details
- Structural system: Timber framing and load-bearing masonry

National Historic Site of Canada
- Official name: Government House National Historic Site of Canada
- Designated: 1982

Government House is the official residence of the lieutenant governor of Newfoundland and Labrador in Canada. The house was a by-product of the wave of administrative initiatives that took place during the 1820s, including the royal charter of 1825 which bestowed official colonial status for Newfoundland.

The first governors of Newfoundland were naval officers who resided on their flagship, anchored in St. John's harbour. However, Admiral Richard Edwards decided it would be more apt for the Governor to live ashore, and thenceforth the governor resided at Fort Townshend, where the first Government House was constructed. Completed in 1781, it was intended to be a summer house for the governors, but remained in constant use until the present structure was finished in 1831. Never intended for winter use, the inhabitants complained of the cold, and Francis Pickmore even died there in the winter of 1818.

The building plans for Government House were drawn up in England. The Ordinance had told the Treasury that workmen's wages were too high in Newfoundland, and subsequently, workmen in Scotland were engaged and arrived in St. John's to begin construction in April 1827. The original plan as conceived by Governor Cochrane was for a Palladian style two-storey house, plus basement. When completed in 1831, Government House cost £38,175, which was five times the original estimate; equal to £3277019.13 today. The two-storey building consists of a centre block flanked by slightly lower wings on the east and on the west. The exterior is of rough, red sandstone quarried at Signal Hill, trimmed with English Portland stone.

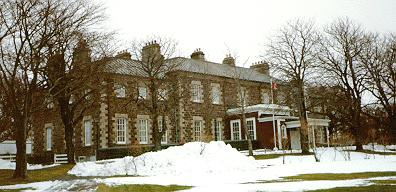
The front of Government House

The construction of the new Government House was meant to reflect the proper status of the governor of a province that was now a proper British colony, and a key part of the Empire. The principal rooms for entertaining—a salon, dining room, and ballroom—along with the main entrance hall were laid out in such a manner as to allow for ceremonial processions, and pomp befitting a governor.

The Lieutenant-Governor's residence is where dignitaries visiting the province are greeted. Inside are also reception rooms, offices and support facilities; the Lieutenant-Governor's office is the site of swearing-in ceremonies for Cabinet ministers, where Royal Assent is granted, and where the Lieutenant-Governor receives the Premier.

The site was designated a National Historic Site of Canada.

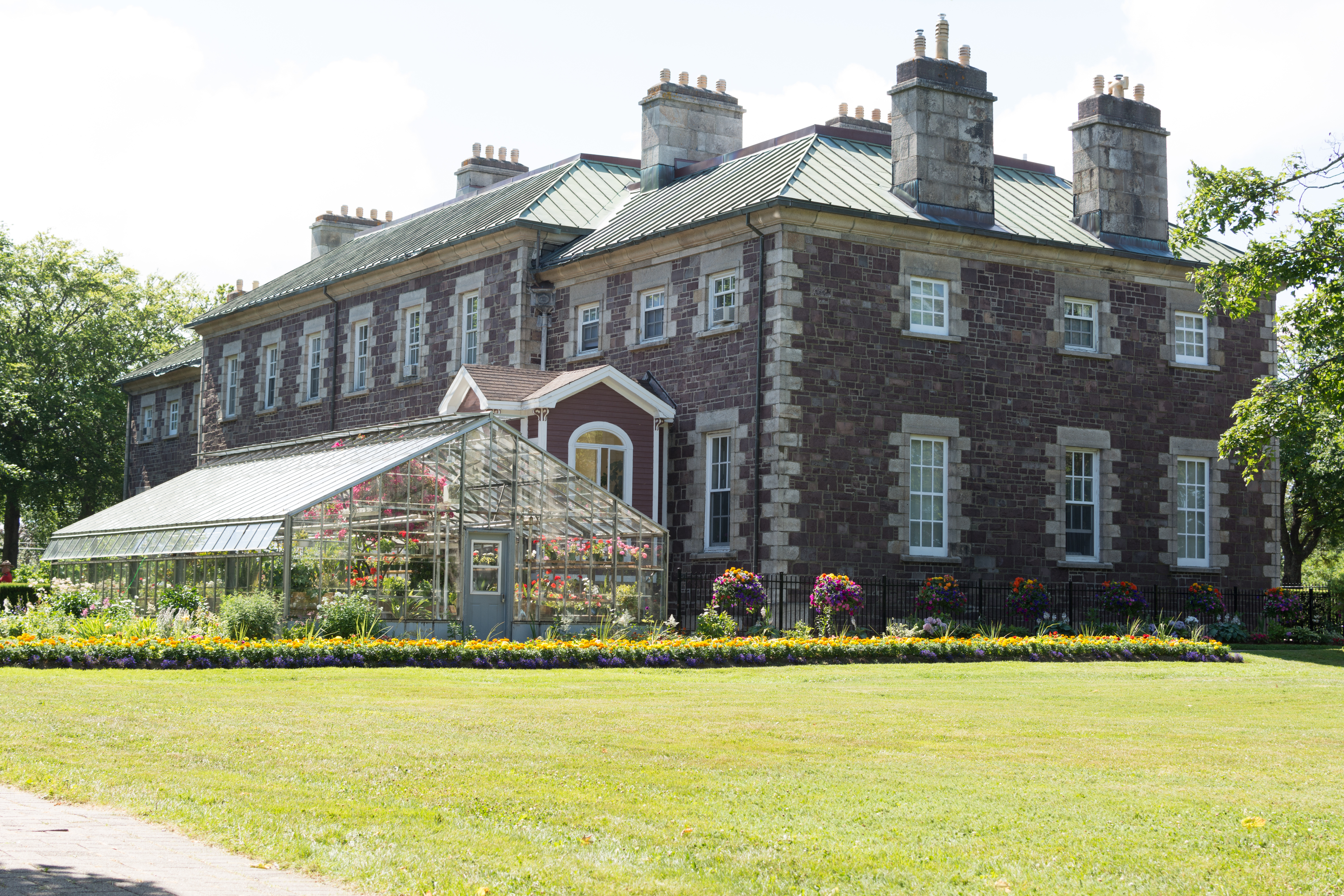
The rear of Government House, greenhouses, and surrounding garden

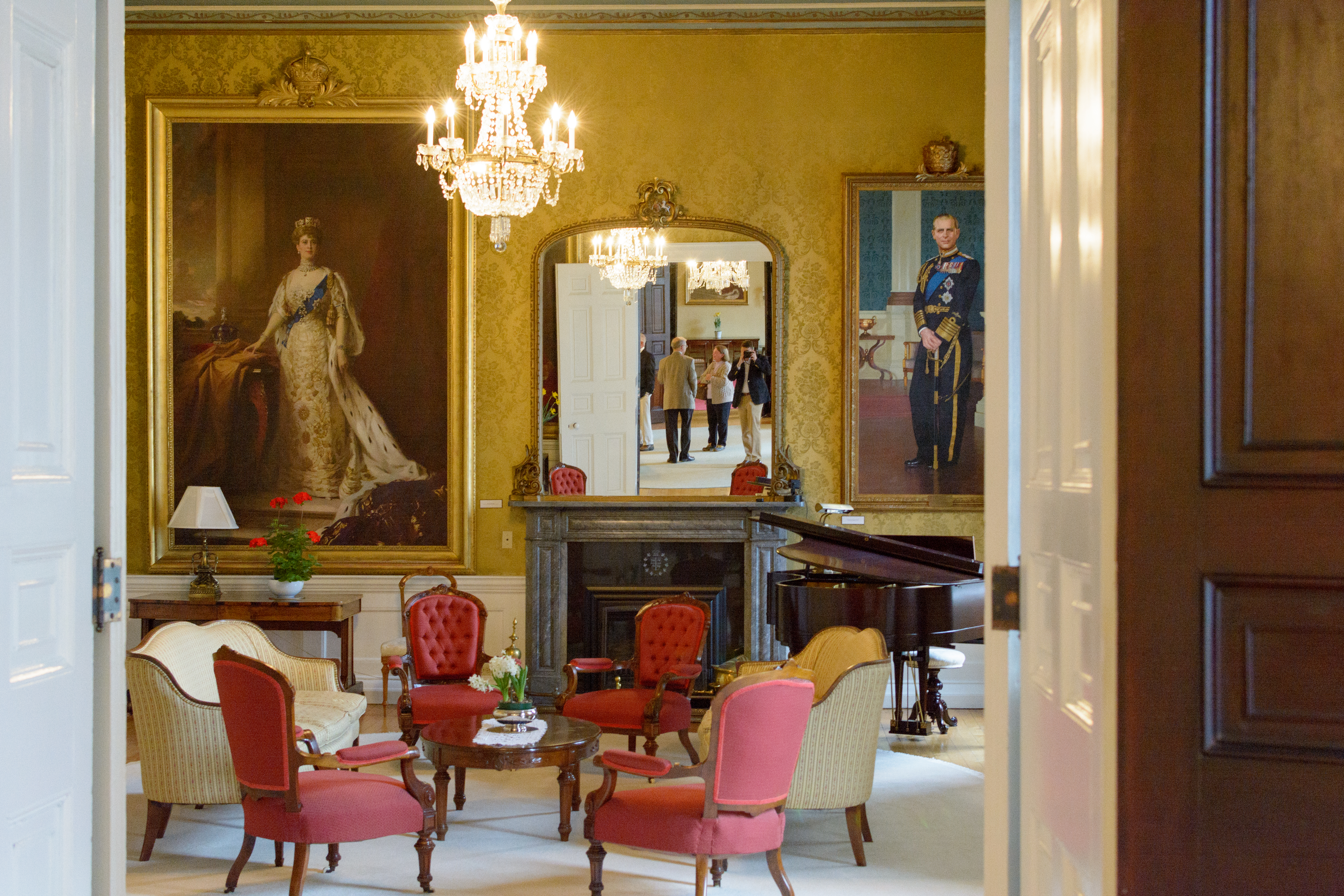
One of the salons in Government House

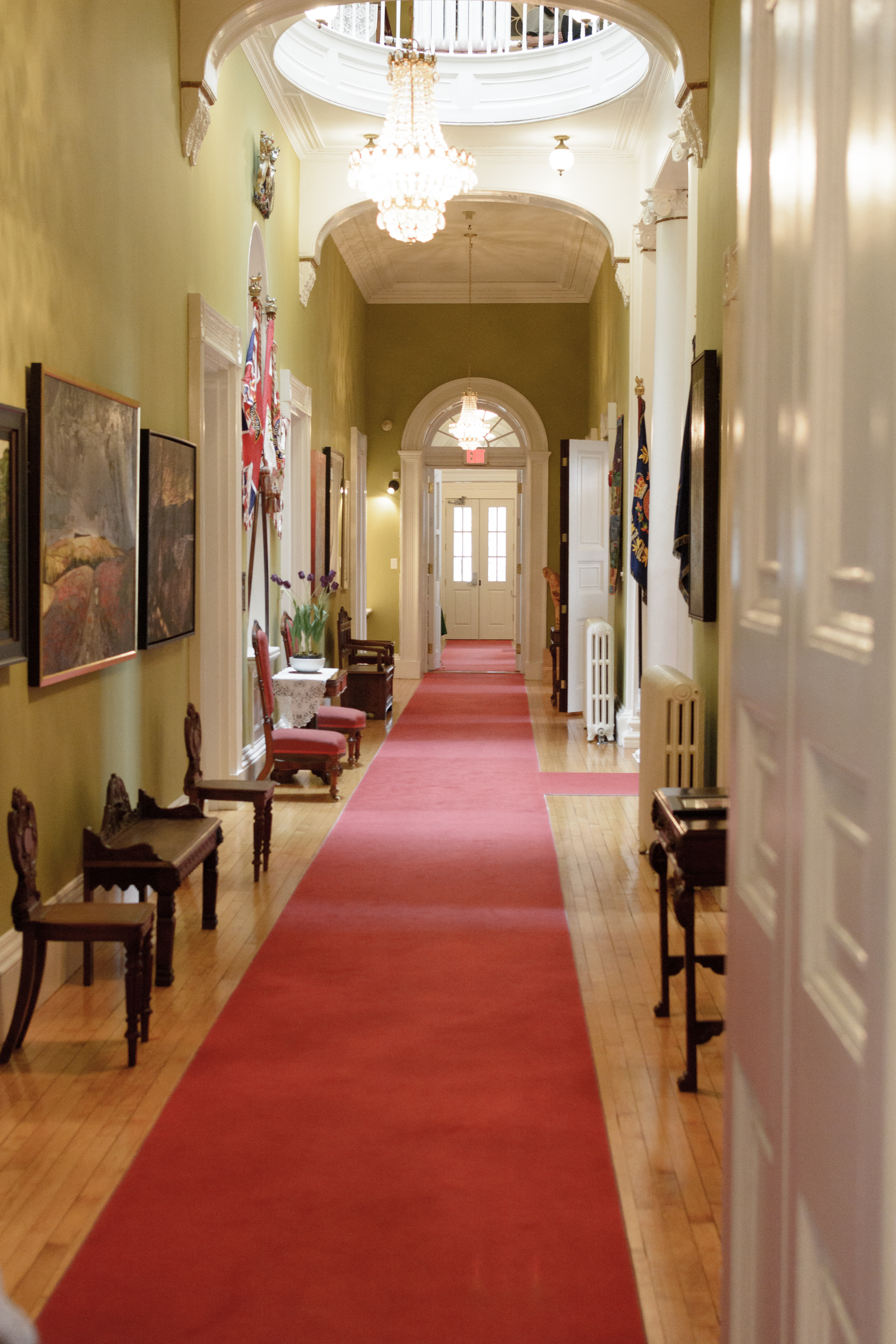
A corridor within Government House

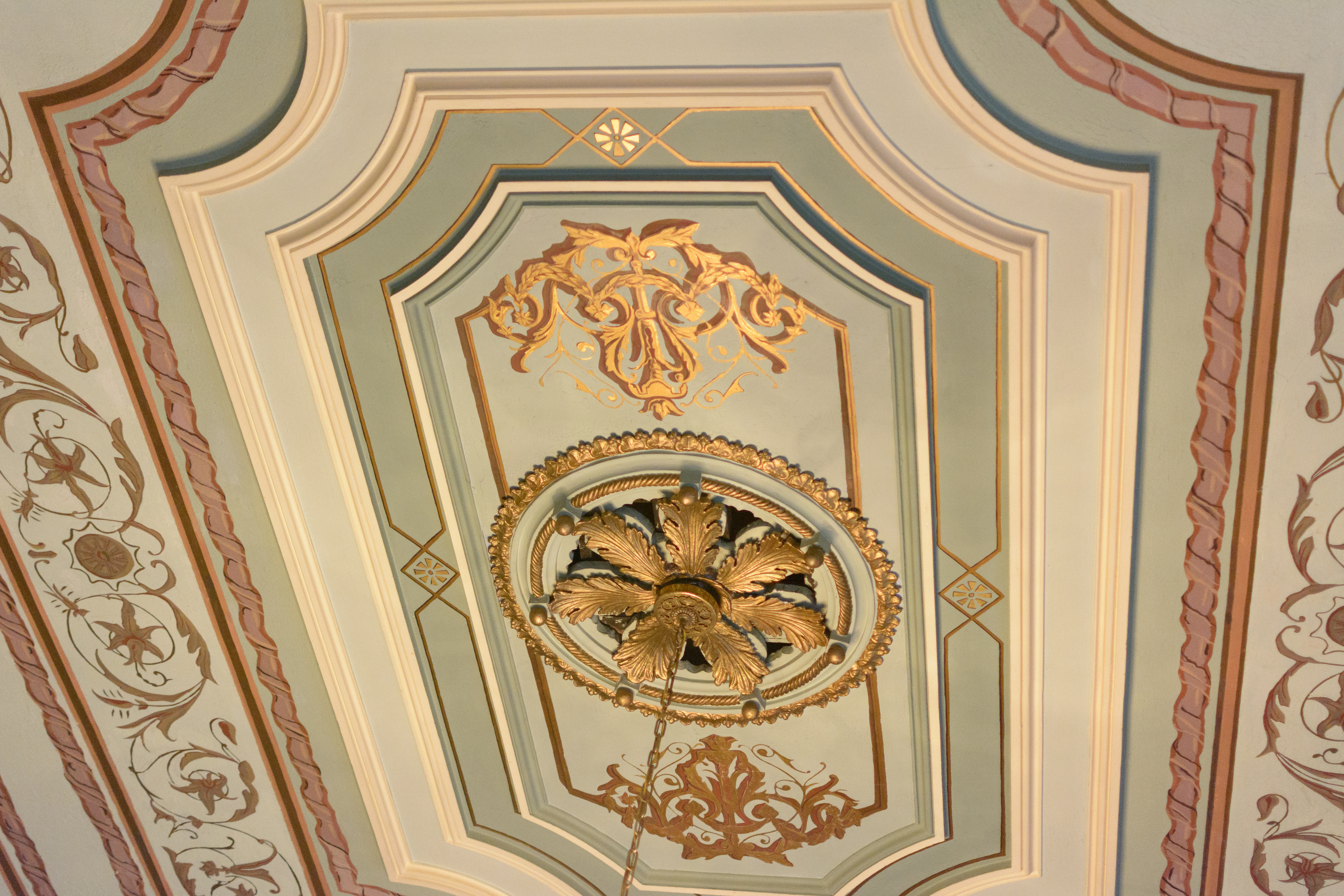
A detail of the painted ceiling in a Government House salon

== See also ==
- Government Houses of Canada
- Government Houses of the British Empire
- Lieutenant-Governors of Newfoundland and Labrador
