= Coat of arms of Newfoundland and Labrador =

Heraldic symbol of Newfoundland and Labrador

Arms of His Majesty The King in Right of Newfoundland and Labrador

Versions
- Escutcheon-only

- For use by the Lieutenant Governor of Newfoundland and Labrador
- Armiger: Charles III in Right of Newfoundland and Labrador
- Adopted: 1637/8, fell into disuse, readopted 1928 under the Dominion of Newfoundland
- Crest: Upon a wreath Or and Gules an elk passant upper
- Shield: Gules a cross argent, in the first quarter a lion passant gardant crowned Or in the second quarter a Unicorn passant argent armed maned and unguled Or gorged with a crown a chain affixed thereto passing between his forelegs and reflexed over his back Or in the third quarter as in the second in the fourth quarter as in the first
- Supporters: Two Beothuks garbed for war proper
- Motto: QUAERITE PRIME REGNUM DEI ("Seek ye first the kingdom of God.") (From The Gospel According to St. Matthew 6:33)

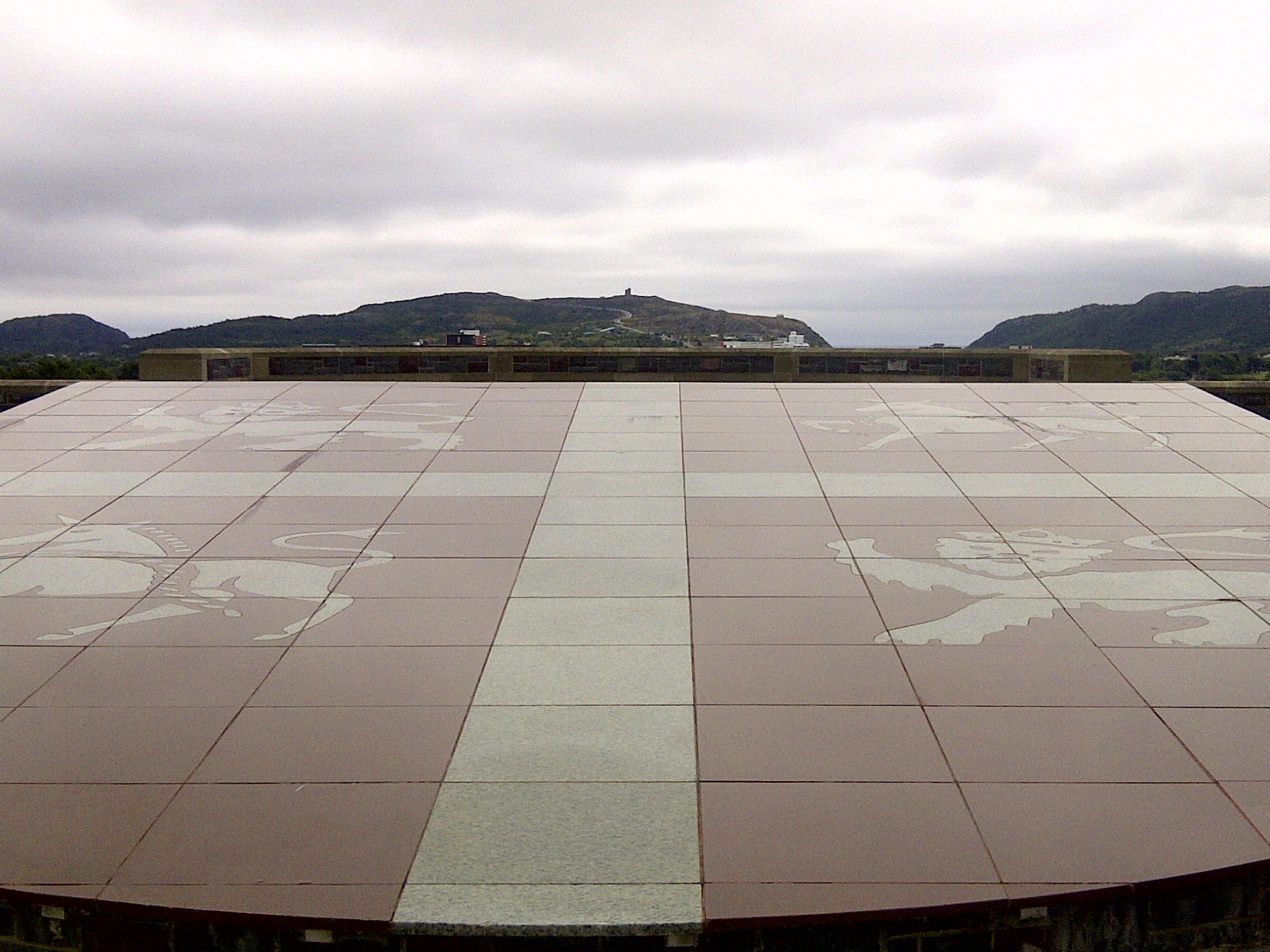
Large shield on the grounds of the Newfoundland and Labrador House of Assembly with Signal Hill and the Narrows in the distance

The coat of arms of Newfoundland and Labrador was originally granted by Garter King of Arms, during the reign of King Charles I, on 1 January 1637/8. (Note: Julian calendar. Also, the date stated on the document says "...first day of Jan. in the 13th yeare of the Raigne of our dread Souveraigne Lord Charles [...] And in the yeare of Grace 1637". The "first day of Jan. in the 13th yeare of the Raigne" would refer to 1 January 1638 but the document states 1637 as the legal year began on 25 March rather than 1 January. see: Old Style and New Style dates)

== History ==
On 13 November 1637, "all that whole Continent Island or Region commonly called NEWFOUNDLAND" was granted to David Kirke, Governor of Newfoundland from 1638 to 1651, James Marquess Hamilton, Phillip Earle of Pembroke & Montgomery and Henry Earle of Holland. On 1 January 1638, it was deemed that a coat of arms was necessary "for the greater honor and splendor of that Countrey and the people therein inhabiting."

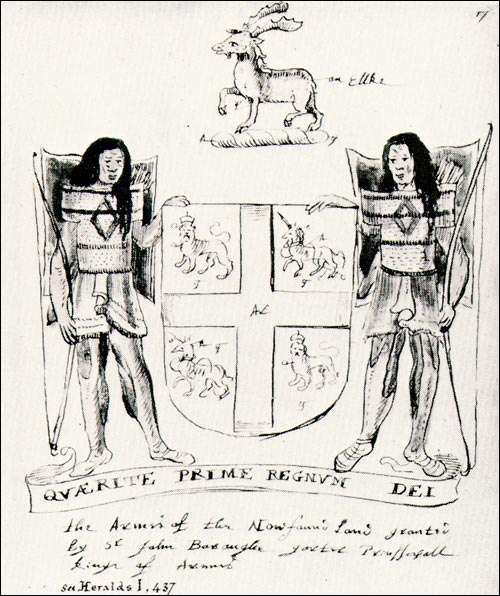
The original arms of Newfoundland granted by Sir John Borough Garter Principal King of Arms, 1637.

The original grant describes the arms as follows:

I have accordingly for the purpose before recited devised sett forth and contrived the Armes & Ensignes hereafter described. That is to say Gules a Grosse Argent In the first Quarter of the Escocheon a Lyon Passant gardant Crowned Or In the second an Unicorne passant of the second armed maned and unguled of the third gorged with a Crowne whereunto is affixed a chaine passing between his fore leggs and reflexed over his back of the last. In the third as in the second. In the fourth as in the first And for the Creast Upon an Healme Mantled Gules doobled Argent and a Wreath Or & Gules an Elke passant pper The Escocheon supported by two Savages of the Clyme pper armed and apparaled according to their Guise when they goe to Warre And Under all in an Escroll this Motto Quaerite prime Regnum Dei as in the Margent more plainly is depicted.

Not long after receiving this grant, a civil war broke out in England. Kirke was a Royalist and on the losing side of the war. Kirke was arrested and died in The Clink in Southwark around the end of January 1654 and the coat of arms granted him was forgotten. It was not used for over 200 years and it appears its existence was unknown to both the Newfoundland and United Kingdom authorities.

Instead, the colony used as its Great Seal both the Royal coat of arms and a design which was approved in 1820 and which incorporated a badge depicting the figure of Mercury, the classical god of commerce, presenting to Britannia a fisherman who, kneeling attitude, is offering the harvest of the sea. Below this, the Latin words "Haec Tibi Dona Fero" meaning "These gifts I bring thee" appear, and written around the circumference of the seal is "Sigillum Terrae Novae Insulae" meaning "Seal of the Island of Terra Nova".

In 1893, D.W. Prowse published A History of Newfoundland, in which he printed a copy of the Newfoundland arms. Prowse erroneously attributed the armorial bearings to John Guy, and described the image as the arms of the "London and Bristol Company for Colonising Newfoundland". The Newfoundland Post Office perpetuated his error by issuing a 1910 two-cent stamp depicting the arms and included attribution to the London and Bristol Company, which financed Guy's colonization attempt.

Following the First World War, the Imperial War Graves Commission requested to know which arms should be used on memorials in French cathedrals commemorating Newfoundland's involvement. Newfoundland's High Commissioner in England, Sir Edgar Bowring began the search, but it was his successor, Captain Victor Gordon, who received confirmation from the College of Arms in London that the Kirke coat of arms belonged to Newfoundland. In 1928 the government of the Dominion of Newfoundland officially adopted this coat of arms. It has been in use ever since, despite the changes in Newfoundland's status from Dominion to a colony run by the Commission of Government in 1934, and subsequently to a province of Canada in 1949. The Coat of Arms Act (RSNL 1990, chapter C-20, as amended) provides the current legal authority for the use of the arms.

== Symbolism ==
Crest

A Moose appears standing on a wreath of gold and red to represent Newfoundland's wildlife.

Escutcheon

Two silver unicorns and two gold lions occupy opposing quadrants of the shield. This part of the coat of arms recalls the royal beasts which appear as supporters on the royal coat of arms of the United Kingdom. The lion represents England and the unicorn represents Scotland.

Compartment

A mossy knoll.

Supporters

The two supporters are fanciful interpretations of the Beothuk, an Indigenous group from the island of Newfoundland.

Motto

Quaerite prime Regnum Dei, quoting Matthew 6:33 from the Bible, "Seek ye first the kingdom of God".

== Redesign ==
Starting in the 2010s, the coat of arms has been criticized for its portrayal of indigenous peoples. In 2016, Indigenous artist Jordan Bennett produced a newly commissioned artwork "tamiow tle’owin" for the "With Secrecy and Despatch" exhibition at the Campbelltown Art Centre, Campbelltown, New South Wales, Australia. The piece focuses on the Newfoundland and Labrador coat of arms and is, according to the artist's statement, "a commentary on the exotification, exploitation, and commodification of Indigenous cultures."

In 2018, the Newfoundland and Labrador government confirmed its plan to redesign the province's coat of arms, in response to the province's Indigenous Peoples Commission's call for changes in the name of reconciliation. Randy Edmunds, MHA for Labrador's Torngat Mountains and parliamentary secretary for Indigenous Affairs, noted at the same time that elk are not native to Newfoundland and Labrador, and suggested it be replaced with a caribou.

News of a potential redesign spawned media polls and tongue-in-cheek suggestions. It also spurred a satirical response from Indigenous newspaper columnist and Qalipu First Nation Councilor Andy Barker.

In June 2021, following the possible discovery of unmarked graves in the Kamloops Indian Residential School in British Columbia, Premier Andrew Furey announced that the government had issued a formal notice to the Newfoundland and Labrador House of Assembly to begin the redesign process.

== See also ==
- Symbols of Newfoundland and Labrador
- Flag of Newfoundland and Labrador
- Canadian heraldry
- National symbols of Canada
- List of Canadian provincial and territorial symbols
- Heraldry
