= Lieutenant Governor of Newfoundland and Labrador =

Representative in Newfoundland and Labrador of the Canadian monarch

- Emblem of the lieutenant governor

- Flag of the lieutenant governor of Newfoundland and Labrador
- Incumbent; Joan Marie Aylward since 14 November 2023
- Viceroy
- Style: His/Her Honour the Honourable
- Residence: Government House, St. John's
- Appointer: The governor general on the advice of the prime minister
- Term length: At the governor general's pleasure
- Formation: 31 March 1949
- First holder: Sir Albert Walsh
- Website: www.govhouse.nl.ca

The lieutenant governor of Newfoundland and Labrador (/lɛfˈtɛnənt/) is the representative in Newfoundland and Labrador of the monarch, who operates distinctly within the province but is also shared equally with the ten other jurisdictions of Canada. The lieutenant governor of Newfoundland and Labrador is appointed in the same manner as the other provincial viceroys in Canada and is similarly tasked with carrying out most of the monarch's constitutional and ceremonial duties. The current, and 15th lieutenant governor of Newfoundland and Labrador is Joan Marie Aylward, who has served in the role since 14 November 2023.

== Role and presence ==
The lieutenant governor of Newfoundland and Labrador is vested with a number of governmental duties and is also expected to undertake various ceremonial roles. For instance, the lieutenant governor acts as patron, honorary president, or an honorary member of certain Newfoundland and Labrador institutions and ex officio is appointed as the Honorary Chief of the Royal Newfoundland Constabulary and Honorary Colonel of the Royal Newfoundland Regiment. Also, the viceroy, him or herself a member and Chancellor of the order, will induct deserving individuals into the Order of Newfoundland and Labrador and, upon installation, automatically becomes a Knight or Dame of Justice and the Vice-Prior in Newfoundland and Labrador of the Most Venerable Order of the Hospital of Saint John of Jerusalem. The viceroy further presents the Lieutenant Governor's Award for Excellence in Public Administration, the Newfoundland War Service Volunteer Medal, and numerous other provincial honours and decorations. These honours are presented at official ceremonies, which count amongst hundreds of other engagements the lieutenant governor partakes in each year, either as host or guest of honour; the lieutenant governor in 2006 undertook 418 engagements and 444 in 2007.

At these events, the lieutenant governor's presence is marked by the lieutenant governor's standard, consisting of a blue field bearing the escutcheon of the Arms of His Majesty in Right of Newfoundland and Labrador surmounted by a crown and surrounded by ten gold maple leaves, symbolizing the ten provinces of Canada. Within Newfoundland and Labrador, the lieutenant governor also follows only the sovereign in the province's order of precedence, preceding even other members of the Canadian Royal Family and the King's federal representative.

== History ==
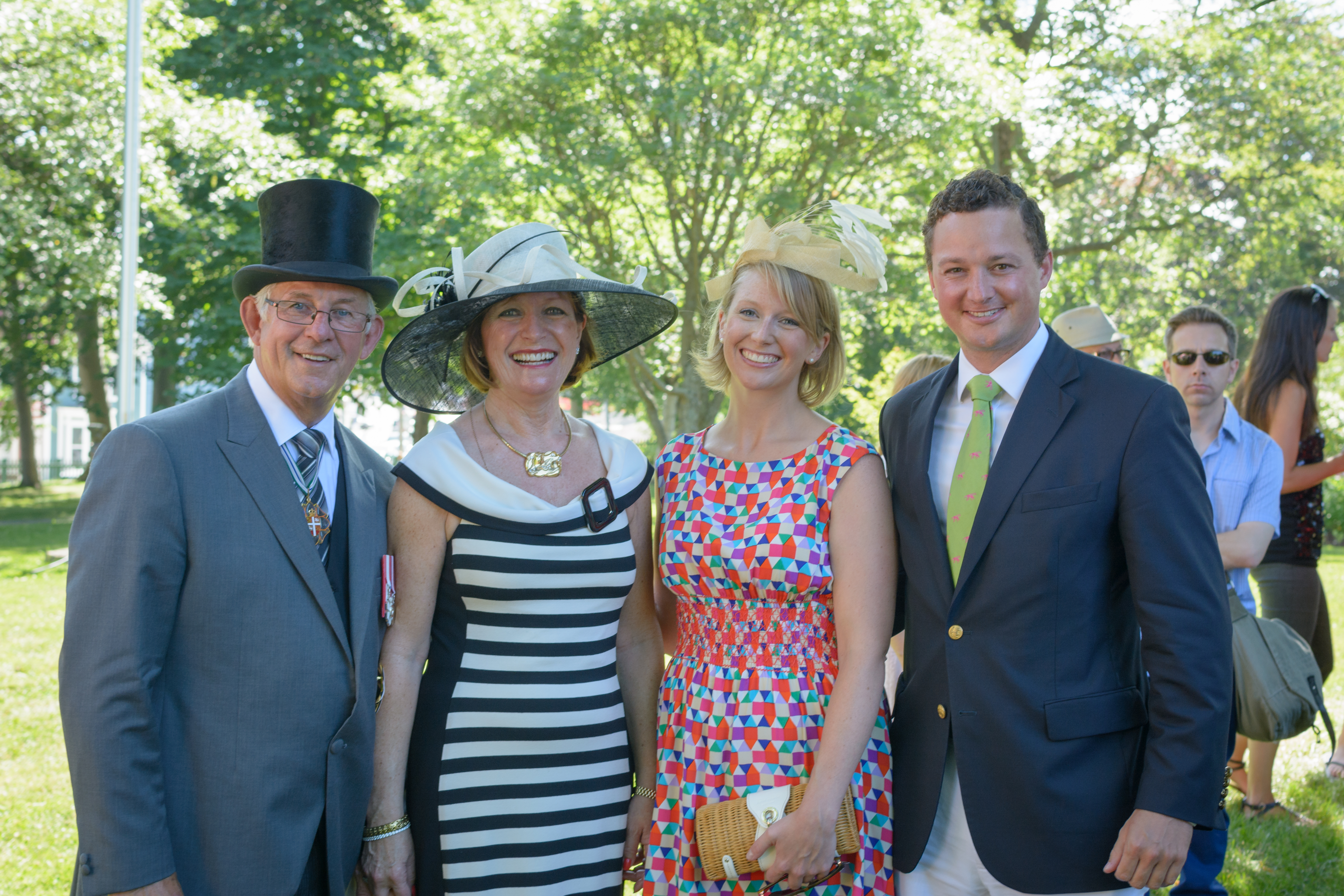
Then-Lieutenant Governor Frank Fagan and Mary Patricia Fagan at a garden party at Government House, 30 july 2014

The lieutenant governor of Newfoundland came into being in 1949, upon Newfoundland's entry into Confederation, and evolved from the earlier position of proprietary governor of Newfoundland. Since that date, 14 lieutenant governors have served the province. The shortest mandate by a lieutenant governor of Newfoundland and Labrador was Albert Walsh, from April to September 1949, while the longest was Leonard Outerbridge, from 1949 to 1957. The first woman to serve as lieutenant governor was Judy Foote, from 2018 to 2023.

== See also ==
- Monarchy in the Canadian provinces
- Government of Newfoundland and Labrador
- Lieutenant Governors of Canada
