= Ode to Newfoundland =

Provincial anthem of Newfoundland and Labrador

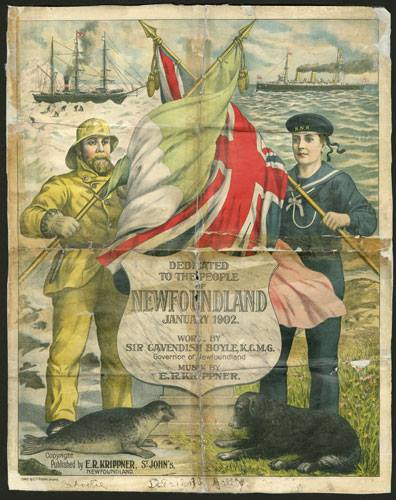
- Sheet music produced for the debut of "Ode to Newfoundland" in January 1902.
- Provincial anthem of Newfoundland and Labrador; Dominion of Newfoundland (National anthem 1907–1949)
- Lyrics: Sir Cavendish Boyle, January 1902
- Music: Sir Hubert Parry
- Adopted: Originally adopted 1904, relinquished 1949, re-adopted 1980

Audio sample
- Children's Vocal rendition: file; help

"Ode to Newfoundland" is the official provincial anthem of Newfoundland and Labrador. It was formally the national anthem of the Dominion of Newfoundland.

Originally composed by Governor Sir Cavendish Boyle in 1902 as a four-verse poem titled Newfoundland; it was sung by Frances Daisy Foster at the Casino Theatre of St. John's during the closing of the play Mamzelle on December 22, 1902. The original score was set to the music of E. R. Krippner, a German bandmaster living in St. John's but Boyle desired a more dignified score. It was then set to the music of British composer Sir Hubert Parry, a personal friend of Boyle, who composed two settings.

On May 20, 1904, the Ode was chosen as Newfoundland's official national anthem. This distinction was dropped when Newfoundland joined Canada in 1949. Three decades later, in 1980, the province re-adopted the song as an official provincial anthem, the first province to do so. The Ode is still sung at public events to this day as a tradition. Typically, only the first and last verses are sung.

== Lyrics ==
When sun rays crown thy pine clad hills,
And summer spreads her hand,
When silvern voices tune thy rills,
We love thee, smiling land.

We love thee, we love thee,
We love thee, smiling land.

When spreads thy cloak of shimmering white,
At winter's stern command,
Thro' shortened day, and starlit night,
We love thee, frozen land.

We love thee, we love thee
We love thee, frozen land.

When blinding storm gusts fret thy shore,
And wild waves lash thy strand,
Thro' spindrift swirl, and tempest roar,
We love thee windswept land.

We love thee, we love thee
We love thee windswept land.

As loved our fathers, so we love,
Where once they stood, we stand;
Their prayer we raise to Heaven above,
God guard thee, Newfoundland

God guard thee, God guard thee,
God guard thee, Newfoundland.

== See also ==
- Canadian patriotic music
- List of Newfoundland songs
- "Ode to Labrador"
