= Index of Newfoundland and Labrador–related articles =

Articles related to the Canadian province of Newfoundland and Labrador include:

== A ==
- L'Anse aux Meadows
- Architecture of St. John's, Newfoundland and Labrador
- Area code 709
- Art of Newfoundland and Labrador
- Atlantic Provinces Economic Council
- Atlantica
- Auditor General of Newfoundland and Labrador
- Avalon Peninsula

== B ==
- Battle of Placentia (1692)
- Bonavista Peninsula
- Burin Peninsula
- Broadcasting Corporation of Newfoundland

== C ==
- Canada–France Maritime Boundary Case
- Census divisions of Newfoundland and Labrador
- Central Labrador
- Centre for Newfoundland Studies
- Cod fishing in Newfoundland
- Collapse of the Atlantic northwest cod fishery
- Confederation Building (Newfoundland and Labrador)

== D ==
- Demographics of Newfoundland and Labrador
- Department of Advanced Education and Skills (Newfoundland and Labrador)
- Department of Child, Youth and Family Services (Newfoundland and Labrador)
- Department of Innovation, Business and Rural Development (Newfoundland and Labrador)
- Department of Natural Resources (Newfoundland and Labrador)
- Diocese of Central Newfoundland
- Diocese of Eastern Newfoundland and Labrador
- Diocese of Western Newfoundland

== E ==
- Elections in Newfoundland and Labrador
- Elections Newfoundland and Labrador
- Encyclopedia of Newfoundland and Labrador
- Executive Council of Newfoundland and Labrador

== F ==
- Franco-Newfoundlander

== G ==
- Geography of Newfoundland and Labrador
- Geological Survey of Newfoundland and Labrador
- Grand Banks
- Great Northern Peninsula
- Gros Morne National Park

== H ==
- Heritage Foundation of Newfoundland and Labrador
- History of Basque whaling
- History of Newfoundland and Labrador
- History of the petroleum industry in Canada (frontier exploration and development)

== I ==
- Indian Bay (Newfoundland and Labrador)
- Ireland Newfoundland Partnership
- Irish language in Newfoundland
- Irish Newfoundlanders

== J ==
J.T. Cheeseman Provincial Park

== K ==
King's Cove Kippens, Newfoundland and Labrador

== L ==
- Labrador Peninsula
- Labrador West, Newfoundland and Labrador
- Lieutenant Governor of Newfoundland and Labrador
- List of airlines of Newfoundland and Labrador
- List of airports in Newfoundland and Labrador
- List of birds of Newfoundland and Labrador
- List of census agglomerations in Newfoundland and Labrador
- List of census divisions of Newfoundland and Labrador
- List of colleges in Newfoundland and Labrador
- List of communities in Newfoundland and Labrador
- List of curling clubs in Newfoundland and Labrador
- List of designated places in Newfoundland and Labrador
- List of fossiliferous stratigraphic units in Newfoundland and Labrador
- List of generating stations in Newfoundland and Labrador
- List of ghost towns in Newfoundland and Labrador
- List of historic places in Newfoundland and Labrador
- List of historic places in Labrador
- List of islands of Newfoundland and Labrador
- List of lakes of Newfoundland and Labrador
- List of lighthouses in Newfoundland and Labrador
- List of National Historic Sites of Canada in Newfoundland and Labrador
- List of Newfoundland and Labrador by-elections
- List of Newfoundland and Labrador general elections
- List of Newfoundland and Labrador highways
- List of Newfoundland and Labrador lieutenant-governors
- List of Newfoundland and Labrador parks
- List of Newfoundland and Labrador premiers
- List of Newfoundland and Labrador provincial highways
- List of Newfoundland and Labrador rivers
- List of mammals of Newfoundland
- List of mountains of Newfoundland and Labrador
- List of municipalities in Newfoundland and Labrador
- List of museums in Newfoundland and Labrador
- List of political parties in Newfoundland and Labrador
- List of population centres in Newfoundland and Labrador
- List of premiers of Newfoundland and Labrador
- List of protected areas of Newfoundland and Labrador
- List of radio stations in Newfoundland and Labrador
- List of rivers of Newfoundland and Labrador
- List of television stations in Newfoundland and Labrador
- List of towns in Newfoundland and Labrador
- List of villages in Newfoundland and Labrador

== M ==
- Maritime Union
- Memorial Day (Newfoundland and Labrador)
- Migratory Fishery of Labrador
- Mistaken Point Ecological Reserve
- Monarchy in Newfoundland and Labrador
- Mushuau Innu First Nation
- Music of Newfoundland and Labrador

== N ==
- National War Memorial (Newfoundland)
- Newfoundland (island)
- Newfoundland and Labrador Court of Appeal
- Newfoundland and Labrador Federation of Labour
- Newfoundland and Labrador House of Assembly
- Newfoundland and Labrador Hydro
- Newfoundland and Labrador Medical Association
- Newfoundland and Labrador Soccer Association
- Newfoundland and Labrador Youth Parliament
- Newfoundland Campaign (1744)
- Newfoundland dog
- Newfoundland English
- Newfoundland French
- Newfoundland Highland forests
- Newfoundland Irish
- Newfoundland outport
- Newfoundland Railway
- Newfoundland Ranger Force
- Newfoundland Rugby Union
- Newfoundland School Society
- Newfie
- NunatuKavut people
- Nunatsiavut
- Nunatukavut

== O ==
- "Ode to Newfoundland"
- Order of Newfoundland and Labrador

== P ==
- Joseph De la Penha
- Politics of Newfoundland and Labrador
- Port Hope Simpson
- Premier of Newfoundland and Labrador
- Province of Avalon
- Provincial Court of Newfoundland and Labrador

== Q ==
- Qalipu Mi'kmaq First Nation Band

== R ==
- Research & Development Corporation Newfoundland and Labrador
- Roads in Newfoundland and Labrador
- Roman Catholic Archdiocese of St. John's, Newfoundland
- Roman Catholic Diocese of Corner Brook and Labrador
- Roman Catholic Diocese of Grand Falls
- The Rooms
- Royal Newfoundland Constabulary

== S ==
- Same-sex marriage in Newfoundland and Labrador
- Scouting in Newfoundland and Labrador
- Seal hunting
- South Falkland
- Speaker of the House of Assembly of Newfoundland and Labrador
- Supreme Court of Newfoundland and Labrador
- Supreme Court of Newfoundland and Labrador (Court of Appeal)
- Symbols of Newfoundland and Labrador

== T ==
- Telecommunications in Newfoundland and Labrador
- Trans-Labrador Highway
- Turbot War

== U ==
- Upper Island Cove, Newfoundland and Labrador

== V ==
- Vehicle registration plates of Newfoundland and Labrador

== W ==
Witless Bay Ecological Reserve

== Y ==
- York Harbour, Newfoundland and Labrador

== See also ==
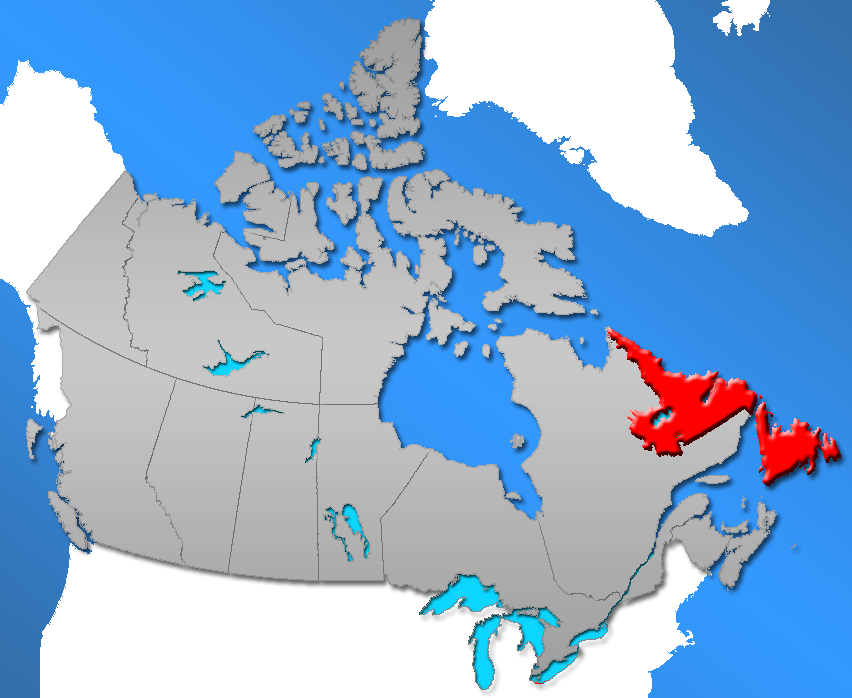
Lists of topics by provinces and territories
