= RDC =

RDC may refer to:

== Transportation ==
- Budd Rail Diesel Car, a self-propelled rail car
- Railroad Development Corporation, an American holding company for foreign railroads
- RDC, station code for Redditch railway station in Great Britain
- RDC, IATA code for Redenção Airport in Brazil

== Entertainment ==
- Radio Drama Company, the BBC troupe which performs radio drama
- RDCWorld, an American YouTube comedy group
- Roblox Developers Conference, formerly known as BLOXcon, an annual event held by Roblox Corporation to showcase new and upcoming features to Roblox.

== Science and technology ==
- Remote Differential Compression, a file synchronization technology in Microsoft Windows
- Remote Desktop Connection, client software for Microsoft Remote Desktop Services
- Remote deposit capture, an electronic banking technology
- Research Diagnostic Criteria, a collection of psychiatric diagnostic criteria
- Residual dipolar coupling, a measurand in NMR spectroscopy

== Government ==
- Rassemblement Démocratique Centrafricain (Central African Democratic Rally), a political party in the Central African Republic
- Regional Development Corporation, a crown corporation in New Brunswick, Canada
- Representative Democratic Council, an advisory group to the post-World War II US military government of South Korea
- Research & Development Corporation Newfoundland and Labrador (2008-2017), a former crown corporation in Newfoundland, Canada
- Rural district council (1894-1974), former class of local government body in the UK and Ireland

== Other ==
- Democratic Republic of the Congo (La République Democratique du Congo), a country
- Recruit division commander, a drill instructor for the United States Navy
- Red Deer College, the former name of the community college in Red Deer, Alberta, Canada
- "Right down canyon" in canyoning
