= Riccardo Levi-Setti =

- Born: July 11, 1927
- Died: November 8, 2018 (aged 91)
- Education: University of Pavia
- Awards: Leonardo da Vinci Award; Steinberg Award
- Scientific career
- Fields: Physics; Paleontology
- Workplaces: University of Chicago Medical Center; Enrico Fermi Institute

Riccardo Levi-Setti (July 11, 1927 – November 8, 2018) was an Italian emeritus professor of physics and paleontology at the University of Chicago and a Holocaust survivor.

== Early life and education ==
Riccardo was born in Milan in 1927 to Paolo and Gilda Levi, a decorated lieutenant colonel in the Italian army of World War I and a Venetian aristocrat. His family fled to Pavia after Benito Mussolini ordered a crackdown on Jews in his hometown. As a result of migration, he obtained his doctorate in physics from the University of Pavia in 1952 and then was awarded a Fulbright Scholarship to go to the United States.

== Career ==
Riccardo joined University of Chicago in 1956, upon invitation from Enrico Fermi. There he started his career as an assistant professor of particle physics and by 1963 was promoted to tenure professor. He contributed to the discovery of neutral kaon decay, for which James Cronin was awarded with the Nobel Prize a year later. Riccardo became full professor in 1965, and in 1970s had shifted his research toward ion microscopy. From 1992 to 2000 Riccardo had served as director of the Enrico Fermi Institute, a department of the University of Chicago Medical Center where he was a pioneer in biology and biomedicine.

Levi-Setti spent some time at CERN in 1963 as a John Simon Guggenheim Memorial Fellow.

In 2011 he, along with Roger Hildebrand, participated in the ceremony of the opening of the Enrico Fermi time capsule.

In 1975 he wrote a book called Trilobites, which was reissued in 1993. In 2014 his third book, called The Trilobite Book: A Visual Journey, was published.

== Death and legacy ==
Riccardo had died from natural causes on November 8, 2018, after a brief stay at Montgomery Place, Chicago. After his death, his findings were donated to various museums, including the Field Museum and the American Museum of Natural History as well as Manuels River Hibernia Interpretation Center in Newfoundland, Canada.

His name also present at the exhibit at Manuels River, Newfoundland, Canada. In 2000, an asteroid orbiting between Jupiter and Mars was given his name as 45700 Levi-Setti.

== Personal life ==
Riccardo was married to Nika Semkoff Levi-Setti, a former teacher at the University of Chicago Laboratory Schools and former public relations manager of the Field Museum of Natural History. Together with first wife, Katharine Gould Straight, he had two sons, Emile and Matteo, who were born in 1965 and 1968 respectively. He also had two grandchildren, Allegra and Colette.

== Awards ==
- Guggenheim Fellow (1963)
- Fellow of the American Physical Society
- Leonardo da Vinci Award
- Steinberg Award
