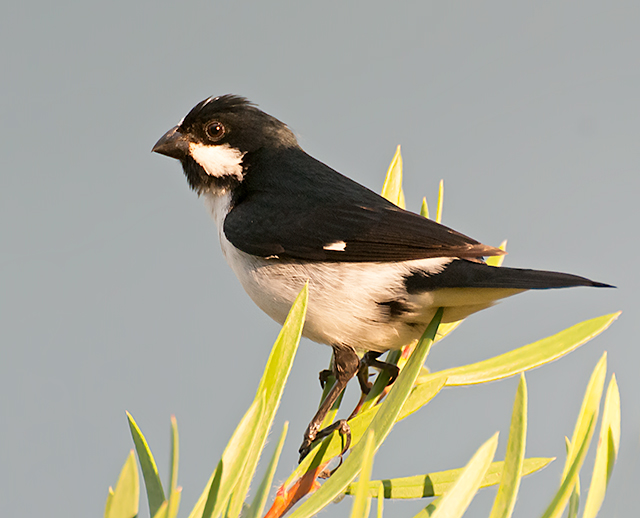
- Male
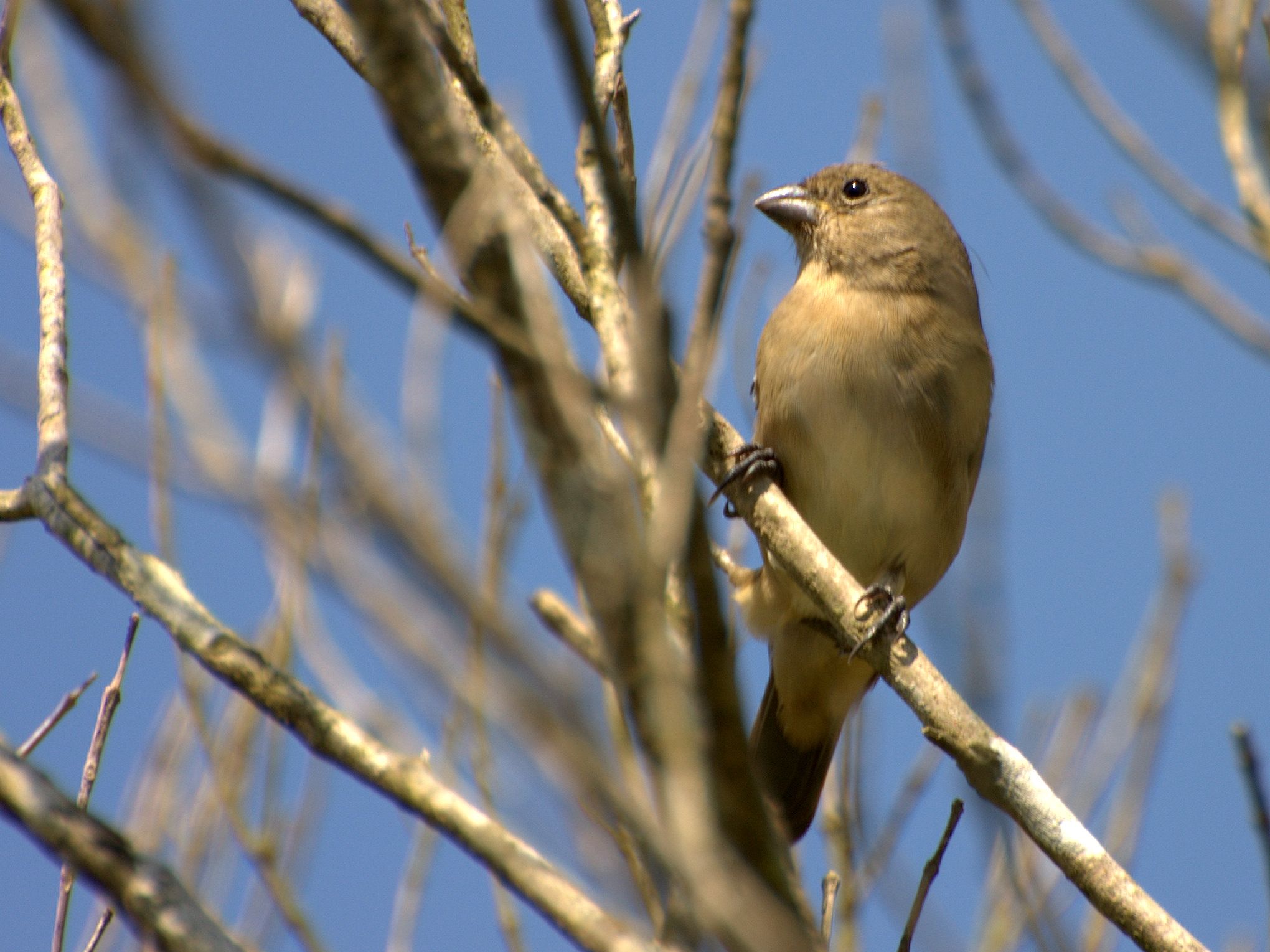
- Female

Conservation status
- Least Concern (IUCN 3.1)

Scientific classification
- Kingdom: Animalia
- Phylum: Chordata
- Class: Aves
- Order: Passeriformes
- Family: Thraupidae
- Genus: Sporophila
- Species: S. lineola

Binomial name
- Sporophila lineola (Linnaeus, 1758)
- Breeding Year-round Non-Breeding

Synonyms
- Loxia lineola (protonym)

= Lined seedeater =

Species of bird

The lined seedeater (Sporophila lineola) is a species of bird in the family Thraupidae, the tanagers and allies. It is found in every mainland South American country except Uruguay, though it has occurred in Chile and on Trinidad as a vagrant.

== Taxonomy and systematics ==
The lined seedeater has a complicated taxonomic history. It was formally described by the Swedish naturalist Carl Linnaeus in 1758 in the tenth edition of his Systema Naturae under the binomial name Loxia lineola. Linnaeus mistakenly specified the "habitat" as Asia; the type locality was subsequently designated as the state of Bahia in Brazil. The specific epithet lineola is Latin meaning "little line" (a diminutive of linea meaning "line"). By 1938 it had been reassigned to its present genus Sporophila that had been introduced by the German ornithologist Jean Cabanis in 1844. At the time genus Sporophila was a member of the family Fringillidae. By 1970 Sporophila had been reassigned to the family Emberizidae. Based on studies published between 1988 and 2011, beginning in 2012 the genus was moved to its present position in the tanager family Thraupidae.

The lined seedeater is monotypic. However, for a time in the twentieth century what is now Lesson's seedeater was a subspecies.

== Description ==
The lined seedeater is 10 to 11 cm (3.9 to 4.3 in) long and weighs 7.5 to 12 g (0.26 to 0.42 oz). It has a short thick bill with a rounded culmen. The species is sexually dimorphic. Adult males have a mostly black head with a wide white stripe on the forehead and crown and a large triangular white patch on the lower ear coverts and cheek. Their upperparts are black except for a thin white band on the rump. Their wings are mostly black with white bases on the primaries that show as a patch on the closed wing. Their tail is also black. Their throat is black that extends rearward under the white cheek. Their underparts are whitish with black thighs. Adult females have a brownish olive head, upperparts, wings, and tail. Their throat is creamy buff, their breast buffy, and their belly and undertail coverts a paler buff. Both sexes have a dark brown iris. Males have a black bill and legs. Females have a dark maxilla, a horn-colored mandible, and blackish legs.

== Distribution and habitat ==
Over the course of the year the lined seedeater is found from the southeastern half of Colombia south through eastern Ecuador, eastern Peru, and eastern Bolivia into northern Argentina. From those countries its range extends east across most of Venezuela, the Guianas, Paraguay, and most of Brazil. It has occurred as a vagrant in Chile, on Trinidad, and in Panama and Costa Rica. Its seasonal distribution is described in the Movement section.

The lined seedeater is primarily a species of open to semi-open landscapes. These include savanna, caatinga, woodlands in the Gran Chaco, dry forest, and shrubby edges and clearings of denser forest. It is often found near water. In elevation it ranges from sea level to 1,200 m (3,900 ft) in Brazil and to 500 m (1,600 ft) in Venezuela, though there are sight records as high as 1,450 m (4,800 ft) in the latter. It is found below 500 m (1,600 ft) in Colombia, below 400 m (1,300 ft) in Ecuador, and below 1,300 m (4,300 ft) in Peru. Remarkably, the vagrant in Chile was photographed at 4,250 m (13,900 ft).

== Behavior ==
=== Movement ===
The lined seedeater is a complete migrant or nearly so. It breeds in two areas of Brazil, one of which also includes Paraguay and Argentina. The first is in the northeast of Brazil, east of a line approximately from the Atlantic in north-central Maranhão southwest to western Tocantins, then southeast to north-central Minas Gerais, and then northeast to the Atlantic in Alagoas. (The map erroneously shows this area as inhabited year-round.) The other breeding range is in Brazil from an approximate line from the Atlantic in Rio de Janeiro state west to western Mato Grosso and then south to central Paraná. This breeding range continues west across most of Paraguay into extreme southeastern Bolivia and from there south into northwestern Argentina roughly to a line from Tucumán Province east to Corrientes Province.

The species is present year-round in Brazil between the two breeding ranges and to a line west from the northeastern one to west-central Mato Grosso. (This is the southern part of the "non-breeding only" map.) However, it is not clear if this is a resident population or due to influxes at different times from other populations. The species is found north of that line, and including northern Bolivia, Peru, and Ecuador, only as non-breeders.

=== Feeding ===
The lined seedeater feeds mostly on seeds, especially those of grasses. It forages on the ground and while clinging to grass stalks. In the breeding season it usually is in pairs but forms small flocks outside that time.

=== Breeding ===
The lined seedeater's breeding season has not been fully defined. It includes May in northeastern Brazil and February and March in Argentina, and it spans from November to April in southeastern Brazil. The species' nest is a cup made from grass roots and sometimes other plant fibers bound with spider web. It is typically built in a shrub or tree between about 0.8 and 11 m (3 and 36 ft) above the ground. The clutch is two or three eggs. The female alone incubates, for 10 to 11 days. Fledging occurs nine to 13 days after hatch and both parents provision nestlings.

=== Vocalization ===
The lined seedeater has at least two geographically different songs. In the caatinga of the east it is "a trill followed by tuweet or a few introductory tic notes followed by a trill, dit dit dit drdrdrdrdrdr". In the south it is "a pleasant resonating and warbling trill, didididididee or krrrrrrrrr, followed by one or more high-pitched chip notes". Its calls are "check, a dull trilling kirik and a strident and repeated whistled peeu".

== Status ==
The IUCN has assessed the lined seedeater as being of Least Concern. It has an extremely large range; its population size is not known but is believed to be stable. No immediate threats have been identified. In Brazil it is considered "frequent to uncommon" within the proper season. It is "uncommon to locally fairly common" in Venezuela, "uncommon" in Colombia, "casual" in Ecuador, and "uncommon" in Peru.
