= Bald Head River (Newfoundland) =

River in Canada

- Location of the mouth of the Bald Head River in Newfoundland and Labrador

Location
- Country: Canada
- Province: Newfoundland and Labrador
- Electoral district: Ferryland

Physical characteristics
- Source: Unnamed lake
  - coordinates: 47°20′16″N 52°44′49″W
  - elevation: 96 m (315 ft)
- Mouth: Atlantic Ocean
  - location: Bald Head
  - coordinates: 47°19′23″N 52°44′32″W
  - elevation: 0 m (0 ft)
- Length: 2 km (1.2 mi)

The Bald Head River is a short river on the Avalon Peninsula in Newfoundland and Labrador, Canada. It flows from an unnamed lake through Bald Head Pond to its mouth at the Atlantic Ocean near a headland named Bald Head and about 5.5 kilometres (3.4 mi) northeast of the community of Bay Bulls.

== See also ==
- List of rivers of Newfoundland and Labrador
