= Manuels River =

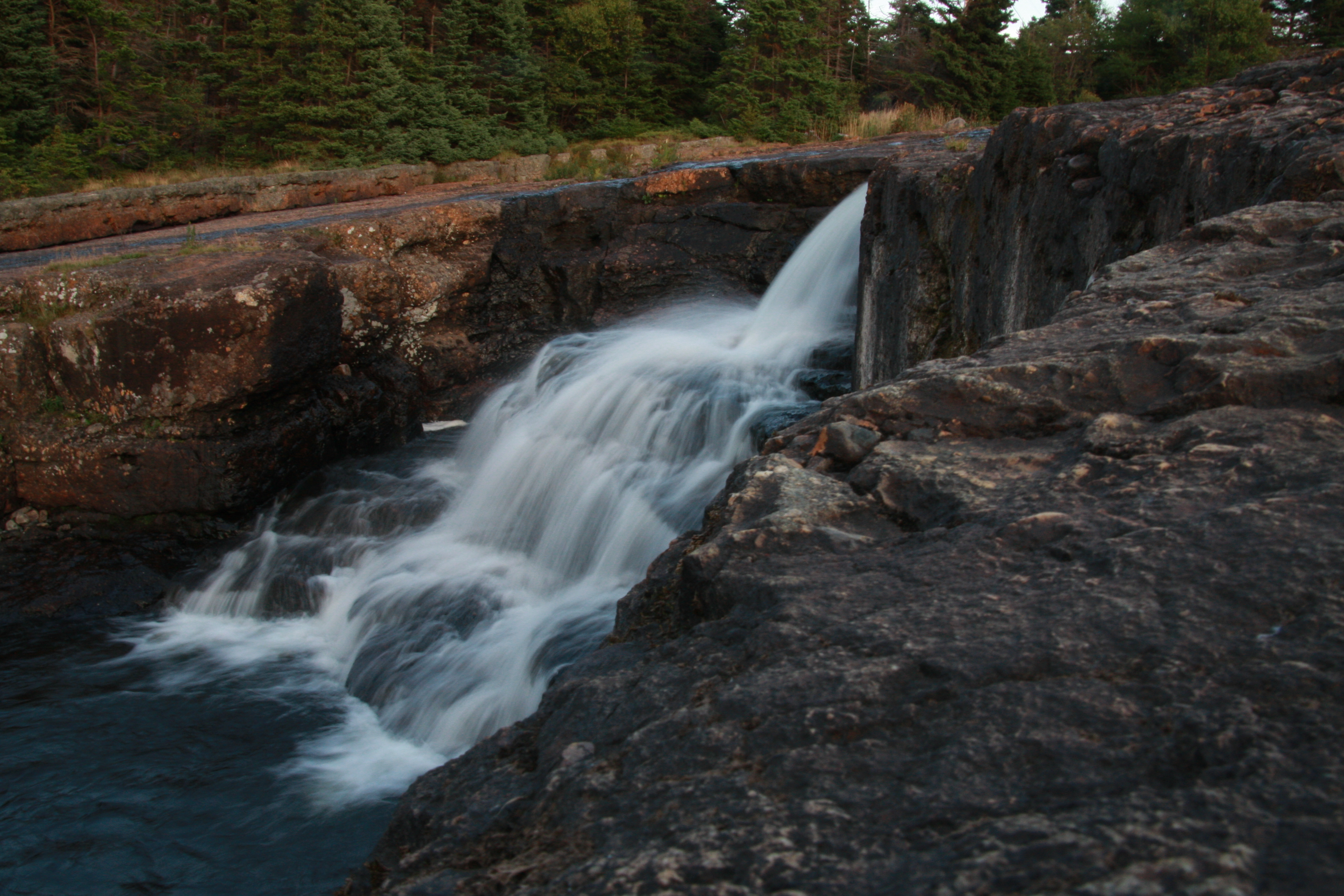
- Manuels River viewed from the Manuels River Trail

Location
- Country: Canada
- Province: Newfoundland and Labrador

Physical characteristics
- Source
  - location: Avalon Plateau
- Mouth
  - location: Conception Bay
  - coordinates: 47°31′38″N 52°57′06″W
- Length: 10 km (6.2 mi)
- Basin size: 75 km^{2} (29 sq mi)

The Manuels River is located in the eastern portion of the town of Conception Bay South, Newfoundland and Labrador. It forms on the high lands of the central Avalon Plateau, traverses approximately 10 kilometres of terrain and empties into the waters of Conception Bay. The river is accessible via walking trails, which start at the Manuels River Hibernia Interpretation Centre located on the Conception Bay Highway.

== Natural features ==
The river has a natural drainage basin of approximately 75 square kilometres, stretching southward toward the central portion of the Avalon Peninsula. This drainage area contains a high diversity of plant and animal life. A variety of aquatic plants have been identified including sedges, bull rushes and bladderwort. Many species of trees and shrubs common to the boreal forests of eastern Newfoundland thrive on the shoreline and hillsides of the river valley. White birch, cherry, and larch provide spectacular fall colors while fir, black spruce and juniper support the blanket of winter snowfall.

Over thirty different species of wild flowers grow along the edge of the river or under the forest canopy. These include yarrow, thistle, sheep laurel, wild mint, goldenrod and the showy blue flag iris.

Small and large mammals call Manuels River their home. Moose, red fox, and barren ground caribou inhabit the upper reaches of the watershed while hare, squirrels, beaver and muskrat prefer the lower river channel or the mouth.

The variety of bird life spotted along the river or at its mouth include sandpiper, crow, pigeons, juncos, gulls, and the belted kingfisher. The kingfisher enjoys the distinction of being the emblem for the Manuels River Natural Heritage Society.

== Diversions ==
Diversions from the drainage basin, due to the hydroelectric developments, have reduced the volumetric flow considerably.

== Fossils ==
Trilobites are the primary fossil remains found in the rocks of the Manuels River. These prehistoric animals lived on the seabed and left trails as they crawled around in search of food. Trilobites resemble sow bugs (commonly known as 'carpenters') or crabs and were first discovered along the river in 1874 by T.C. Weston of the Geological Survey of Canada. Complete specimens are rare, however, some have been found measuring as long as 30 cm. Many of the fossil remains are fragments of their shells discarded in a manner similar to today's lobsters.

Removing fossil specimens and rock samples is prohibited, but the Society encourages observation and provides educational tours of these wonders from our prehistoric past.

== Natural Heritage Society ==
The river has inspired a volunteer organization, the Manuels River Natural Heritage Society. Its mission is to conserve the river's natural beauty. It maintains a set of walking trails.

=== Manuels River Hibernia Interpretation Centre ===
In 2013, a centre was opened to showcase some of the fossils found in the river and the geology of the area.

== See also ==
- List of rivers of Newfoundland and Labrador
