= List of airlines of Newfoundland and Labrador =

This is a list of airlines of Newfoundland and Labrador which have an air operator's certificate issued by the Civil Aviation Authority of Canada.

== Current airlines ==
Airline	Image	IATA	ICAO	Callsign	Hub airport(s) or headquarters	Notes
Air Borealis			LBR	NORTHLIGHT	Goose Bay	Regional, charters
Cougar Helicopters			CHI	COUGAR	St. John's	Scheduled passenger services to oil platforms and ships off the Newfoundland coast
Exploits Valley Air Services		8K		EVAS	Gander	Scheduled passenger service as part of Air Canada Express, sightseeing flights, air ambulance services and maintenance
Newfoundland Helicopters					Clarenville	Helicopters
Innu Mikun Airlines					Goose Bay	Regional airline, charters. A joint partnership between Innu Development Limited Partnership and Provincial Airlines.
PAL Airlines		PB	SPR	SPEEDAIR	St. John's	Scheduled passenger service, charters
3D Helicopters					St. John's	Helicopter charter

== Defunct airlines ==
Airline	Image	IATA	ICAO	Callsign	Hub airport(s) or headquarters	Notes
Air Labrador		WJ	LAL	LAB AIR	Goose Bay	1986 – 2017; Merged to form Air Borealis
Air Atlantic		9A	ATL	DASH	St. John's	1985 – 1998; Feeder airline for Canadian Pacific Airlines and Canadian Airlines
Air Transit				TRANSIT	St. John's	Defunct 1975
Ashuanipi Aviation				ASHUANIPI	Wabush	1975 – 2006; Merged into Air Saguenay
Aztec Aviation				AZTEC	St. John's	
Canadian Helicopters			CDN	CANADIAN	St. John's	1987 – 2000; Moved to Les Cèdres, Quebec
CHC Helicopter			HMB	HUMMINGBIRD	St. John's	1987 – 2008; Moved to Richmond, British Columbia
Coastal Air Services				COASTAL	Winterland	
Eastern Provincial Airways		156 - PV	PV	PROVINCIAL	Gander	1949 – 1987; Merged into Canadian Airlines
Gander Aviation				GANDER	Gander	1960 – 1979
Gracefield Aviation				GRACE	Stephenville	
Newfoundland Airways				NEW AIR	Gander	1948 – 1983; Merged to form Air Labrador
Ocean Air Services				OCEAN	St. John's	
Sealand Helicopters			SEA	SEALAND	St. John's	1977 – 1987; Merged to form CHC Helicopter
Triton Airlines				TRITON	St. John's	1993 – 1994
Universal Helicopters				UNIVERSAL	Goose Bay	1963 – 2020
Viking Helicopters				VIKING	Pasadena	Merged to form CHC Helicopter in 1987
