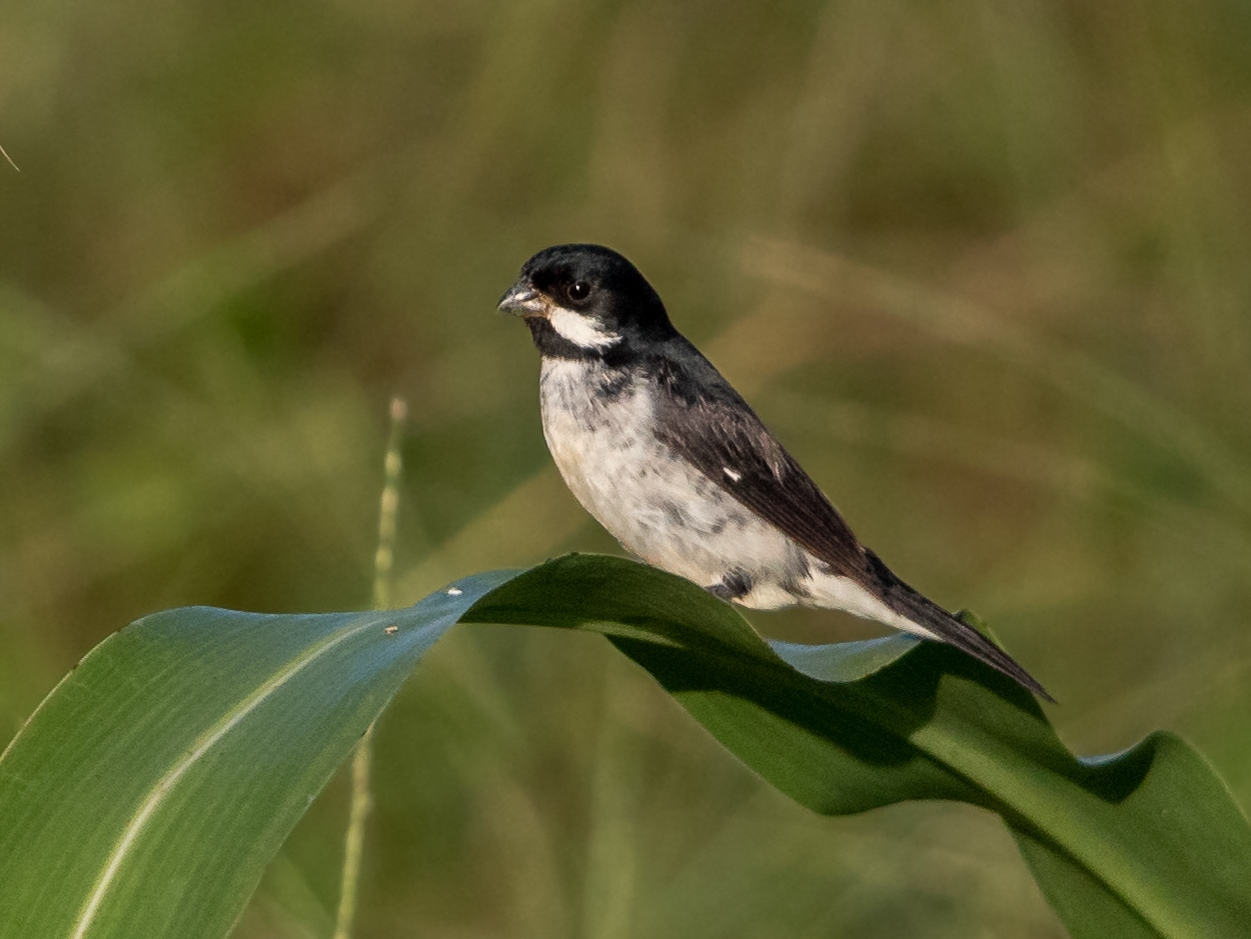

Conservation status
- Least Concern (IUCN 3.1)

Scientific classification
- Kingdom: Animalia
- Phylum: Chordata
- Class: Aves
- Order: Passeriformes
- Family: Thraupidae
- Genus: Sporophila
- Species: S. bouvronides

Binomial name
- Sporophila bouvronides (Lesson, 1831)

= Lesson's seedeater =

Species of bird

Lesson's seedeater (Sporophila bouvronides) is a species of bird in the family Thraupidae, the tanagers and allies. It is found in Bolivia, Brazil, Colombia, Ecuador, French Guiana, Guyana, Peru, Suriname, Trinidad, and Venezuela. It has also been documented as a vagrant to the north of its usual range.

== Taxonomy and systematics ==
Lesson's seedeater has a complicated taxonomic history. It was formally described in 1831 with the binomial Pyrrhula bouvronides. By 1938 it had been reassigned to its present genus Sporophila. By 1970 it had been reclassified as the subspecies Sporophila lineloa bouvronides of the lined seedeater. By 2007 it had been restored to full species status with its present binomial. At the time genus Sporophila was a member of the family Emberizidae. Based on studies published between 1988 and 2011, beginning in 2012 the genus was moved to its present position in the tanager family Thraupidae.

Several taxonomic systems treat Lesson's seedeater as monotypic. However, as of late 2025 the Clements taxonomy includes a second subspecies S. b. restricta (Todd, 1917) whose range is within that of the monotypic species.

This account follows the majority monotypic species model.

== Description ==
Lesson's seedeater is 10 to 11 cm (3.9 to 4.3 in) long and weighs 8 to 11 g (0.28 to 0.39 oz). It has a short thick bill with a rounded culmen. The species is sexually dimorphic. Adult males have a mostly matte black head with a large triangular white patch on the lower ear coverts and cheek. Their upperparts are black except for a thin white band on the rump. Its wings are mostly black with white bases on the primaries that show as a patch on the closed wing. Their tail is also black. Their throat is black, their breast white with diffuse black markings, and the rest of their underparts whitish. Adult females have an olive-brown head, upperparts, wings, and tail. Their throat is creamy buff, their breast buffy, and their belly and undertail coverts a paler buff. Both sexes have a dark brown iris. Males have a black bill and legs. Females have a dark maxilla, a horn-colored mandible, and blackish legs.

== Distribution and habitat ==
Lesson's seedeater breeds from northeastern Colombia east across northern Venezuela and the northern Guianas, and on Trinidad. It apparently entirely vacates that range in the non-breeding season. Then it is found from southeastern Colombia south through eastern Ecuador and eastern Peru into northern Bolivia and from those countries east across northern Amazonian Brazil and the south of the Guianas to the Atlantic. Its presence in southern Venezuela during winter is uncertain. In Brazil its southern boundary is a line approximately from southern Rondônia northeast to northeastern Pará.

Lesson's seedeater has also occurred as a vagrant in Panama and Costa Rica. One that appeared in Quebec, Canada, in 2021 was not accepted for the official record because its origin is uncertain.

Lesson's seedeater is primarily a bird of grasslands, pastures, and shrubby areas and is usually found near water. In the breeding season it also is found on the edges and clearings in forest.

== Behavior ==
=== Movement ===
Lesson's seedeater is entirely migratory or nearly so. Its breeding and non-breeding ranges are described above. It is present in its Venezuelan breeding range mostly between May and early November though there are records both earlier and later. It is "[l]argely or entirely absent Dec-Apr...details of movements [are] not fully understood".

=== Feeding ===
Lesson's seedeater feeds primarily on grass seeds. It takes most while gripping the grass stalk and also feeds on the ground. On its non-breeding range it forms flocks.

=== Breeding ===
Lesson's seedeater breeds primarily between April and November. Males are territorial and sing from a perch atop a shrub or tree. Its nest is a cup made from grass and rootlets, typically built in a sapling or larger tree between about 5 and 10 m (16 and 33 ft) above the ground. The clutch is two or three eggs that are whitish with brown and blackish markings. The incubation period and time to fledging are not known. Both parents provision nestlings but other details of parental care are not known.

=== Vocalization ===
The song of Lesson's seedeater "begins with a few harsh notes and then changes into melodious notes, chaw, chee childedee-chea-chea-chea or jaaaw, geee, chutchutchutjeet". A simpler description from Trinidad is "a long rolling trill followed by chattering". In Venezuela it is described as "a short, rubbery trill followed by abrupt tu-weet at end; or sometimes a few tic notes followed by a trill, then either a pause of more tic notes". There it also sometimes makes "just a single short rattle, drdrdrdrdrdr, with no notes at the end".

== Status ==
The IUCN has assessed Lesson's seedeater as being of Least Concern. It has a very large range; its population size is not known but is believed to be stable. No immediate threats have been identified. As a breeder it is considered common in Venezuela and uncommon in Colombia. In the non-breeding season it is rare in Ecuador, uncommon in Peru, and "uncommon to rare" in Brazil.
