= Joseph De la Penha =

Joseph De la Penha (1658–1731) was a Sephardic Jewish merchant, ship-owner, and financier based in Rotterdam. In 1697, he was granted most of Labrador (between 54° and 60° latitude) by King William III in 1697.

== Biography ==
De la Penha fled the Iberian Peninsula in the late 17th century during the War of the Spanish Succession amidst the larger backdrop of the Spanish Inquisition. He settled in Holland where he had at least two sons, one of whom was Daniel de la Penha. He was granted control of Laborador by the English crown in 1697, possibly as a reward for one of de la Penha's captains having discovered the area during a storm in the 1670s.

== History of the grant ==
Ownership was passed on to his offspring and reconfirmed in 1732 and 1768. Dutch traders in Labrador in the early 1700s asked and received permission for trading with the indigenous population, probably both Inuit and Innu, and paid taxes to the De La Penha family. Descendants of the family are now found in the Netherlands, the USA, the United Kingdom, and Canada, and in all branches the ownership of the Labrador claim is part of their oral history. At least four cases over the ownership of Labrador were brought to court by the end of the 19th century.

Simon Appleboom, an English non-observant Jewish man of Sephardic/Dutch descent from Spitalfields in the City of London, began a legal action in New York in 1931 to look into his claim to his lineage to Rachel Penha. This claim was later lost in the need to focus on getting through World War II without drawing too much attention to his ancestry and to integrate fully into English society. The solicitors involved were said to have kept his substantial investments. His descendants from London still hold a retainer from King William of Orange along with his British army service medals, but adhere to his philosophy that it should all belong to the British crown.
