= Migratory Fishery of Labrador =

The province of Newfoundland and Labrador had three main types of fishery in the 19th century: sealing, migratory and inshore fishery. By 1620, whaling was no longer possible in Labrador, and the fishery became the main resource of the territory. The Newfoundland Act 1698, which was designed to promote the migratory fishery, lead to land grant disputes throughout Labrador.

== Sealing ==
Sealing was a type of fishery that involved getting a berth or "ticket" on a ship that traveled to ice floes near Newfoundland and Labrador. Teams would then be sent out onto the ice to kill seals. This used to be done with a tool called a gaff hook but is now performed with a large club. There was escalating controversy about the industry in the 1970s, leading to the industry being banned. It was legalized recently for population control. Although it is not the staple it once was, the industry is still quite profitable.

== Migratory fishery ==
Migratory fishery involved people from Newfoundland sailing to Labrador to fish there. Migratory fishers either stopped at land they owned and fished from there (stationers) or stayed on the ship and moved to different fishing grounds (floaters). The floaters were more mobile than the stationers, but their fish had to be heavily salted because they could not dry their fish until they got home. This fishery's season lasted from early summer to early fall, but even then conditions were harsh.

== Inshore fishery ==
The inshore fishery, although the staple of the industry, wasn't as interesting as the other types of fishery. It simply involved getting into a boat, catching the fish, curing them and selling them to a fish merchant for store credit.
