= Wild mint =

Wild mint may refer to:

- Mentha arvensis
- Mentha longifolia
