= Air Saguenay =

Former regional airline in Canada

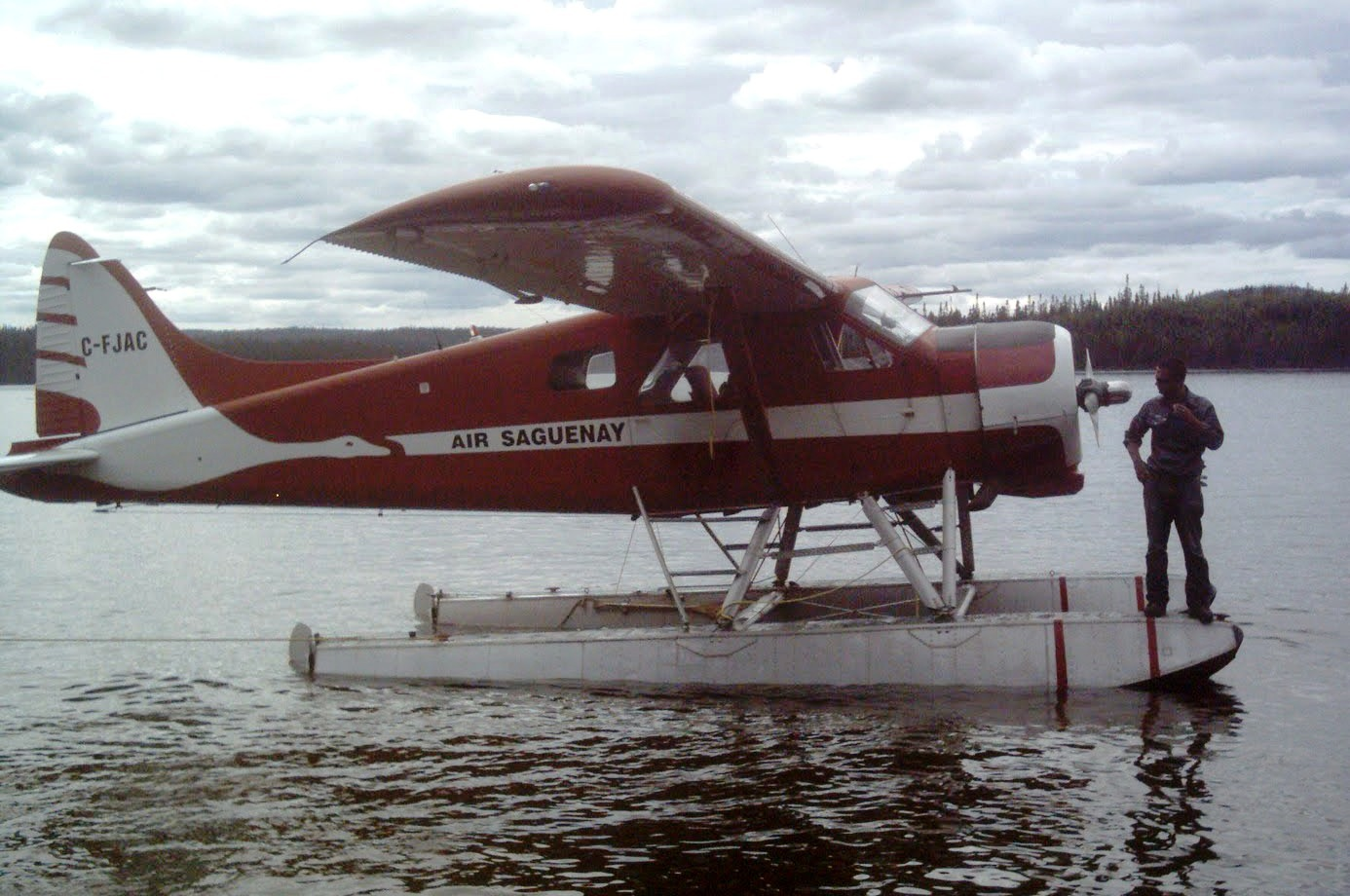
- An Air Saguenay DHC-2 Beaver
- Founded: 1960
- Ceased operations: November 2019
- AOC #: 1230
- Operating bases: Lac Sébastien Water Aerodrome; Chutes-des-Passes/Lac Margane Water Aerodrome
- Fleet size: 2
- Headquarters: Jonquière, Quebec, Canada
- Key people: Peter Schoch, owner; Jean-Claude Tremblay, owner
- Website: www.airsaguenay.com

Air Saguenay was a regional airline based in Jonquière, Quebec, Canada (now Saguenay, Quebec, Canada).

== History ==
In the early 1960s Peter Schoch, mink breeder, bought Saguenay Air Service, a carrier based at Kenogami Lake, owned by Saguenay Aero Club and used to train pilots. Schoch decided to open a new seaplane base, Lac Sébastien Water Aerodrome at St-David de Falardeau, Lake Sebastien, to offer a better service to companies like Alcan or Price Brothers, fishermen, hunters and services for forest fire patrol. The company expanded and merged in 1969 with Gagnon Air Service to form a new company, Air Saguenay.

In 1980, Jean-Claude Tremblay became the new owner, pushing the company one step further with his personalized approach and the quality of his services. A second seaplane base, Chutes-des-Passes/Lac Margane Water Aerodrome was opened at Chute-des-Passes, now Passes-Dangereuses, in 1982. It was a strategic location for accessing new territories for fishing and moose hunting and to better position the company towards the north. 1984 was a major year for the expansion of Air Saguenay. In 1984 it purchased Air Caribou in Fermont and also acquired Club Chambeaux outfitters which gave the company access to great fishing and caribou hunting territory in Northern Quebec. In 1986, the growth continued with the addition of a new seaplane base in Schefferville. Tremblay also purchased many other small bush operators in the 1990s, to reinforce the position of his company throughout Northern Quebec.

Since 1998, the carrier expanded again with the purchase of Expeditair in 1999, Grand Island Aviation in 2000, Aéro Golfe in 2001, Labrador Air Safari in 2006 and Deraps Aviation in 2011, both companies located on the north shore of the Saint Lawrence River and in 2006 acquired Ashuanipi Aviation. Air Saguenay has now become, under Jean-Claude Tremblay and his son Jean Tremblay, an important bush carrier in Eastern Canada.

Air Saguenay also operated Lac Pau (Caniapiscau) Water Aerodrome and Sept-Îles/Lac Rapides Water Aerodrome.

In November 2019, facing several challenges, notably the end of caribou hunting in Quebec and a lawsuit following the July accident, Air Saguenay ceased operations.

== Fleet ==
As of December 2020 Transport Canada had 16 aircraft listed but only two with operating certificates:

Air Saguenay fleet
Aircraft	No. of aircraft TC	Variants	Notes
Cessna 185 Skywagon	3	185E Skywagon, A185F Skywagon	Only one A185F with a valid certificate, up to six seats
Cessna 206	1	Cessna U206	Cancelled certificate, up to six seats
de Havilland Canada DHC-2 Beaver	8	Mk 1	Only one with a valid certificate, up to six passengers
de Havilland Canada DHC-3 Otter	4		All with cancelled certificates, 9 - 10 passengers

== Accidents and incidents ==
- On 16 July 2010, a de Havilland Canada DHC-2 Beaver floatplane, registration C-GAXL, crashed into a wooded mountainside and caught fire about 12 nautical miles (22 km; 14 mi) west southwest of Lake Péribonca, Quebec, after encountering adverse weather conditions seven minutes into the flight. Of the six people on board, the pilot and three passengers were killed.
- On 23 August 2015, a de Havilland Canada DHC-2 Beaver floatplane, registration C-FKRJ, crashed into a wooded mountainside and caught fire near Les Bergeronnes, Quebec, shortly after taking off from Long Lake, about 10 NM (19 km; 12 mi) north of Tadoussac, on a sightseeing flight. All people on board, the pilot and six passengers, were killed.
- On 15 July 2019, a de Havilland Canada DHC-2 Beaver floatplane crashed into a Labrador Lake late Monday night. The aircraft was on flight path from a fishing lodge near Crossroads Lake, near the Quebec border, to a remote camp on Mistastin Lake in northern Labrador. On board were seven people, four of them are confirmed dead including the pilot and the fate of the remaining three is unclear as they are missing. The cause of the crash has not yet been determined however officials with the Transportation Safety Board of Canada have been called in. All seven people died and the crash forced the closure of the airline.

== See also ==
- History of aviation in Canada
- List of defunct airlines of Canada
