= List of rivers of Newfoundland and Labrador =

This is a list of rivers of Newfoundland and Labrador, Canada, divided by watershed. Nearly all watersheds drain primarily either northeast or south to the Atlantic Ocean, and west to the Gulf of St. Lawrence. Rivers in Labrador drain primarily east to the Labrador Sea, and south to the Gulf of St. Lawrence.

== East Coast of Labrador ==
=== Watersheds between Eclipse River and Groswater Bay in Labrador ===
- Labrador Sea
  - Eclipse River, emptying in Eclipse Canal
  - Komaktorvik River, emptying in « Seven Islands Bay»
  - Nachvak Fjord
    - Kogavsok Brook
    - Palmer River, Labrador
  - Saglek Fjord
    - Nakvak Brook
  - Hebron Fjord
    - Ikarut River
  - Okak Bay
    - Siugak Brook
    - North River
    - Ikinet Brook
  - Tasiuyak Bay
    - Avakutak River
      - Avakutak Brook
    - Puttuaalu Brook (flowing through lake Tasiuyak Tasialua, lake Laura and lake Frank)
  - Webb Bay linked to Port Manvers
    - Webb Brook
  - Tikkoatokak Bay
    - Kamanatsuk River
  - Anaktalik Brook
  - Voisey Bay
    - Reid Brook
    - Ikadlivik Brook
    - Toma Brook
    - Konrad Brook
    - Kogaluk River
      - Side Brook
  - Merrifield Bay
    - Notakwanon River
  - Sango Bay
    - Sango Brook
  - Flowers Bay
    - Flowers River
  - Big Bay
    - Hunt River
  - Adlatok Bay
    - Adlatok River, flowing into Adlatok Bay and into Ugjoktok Bay
  - Kanairiktok Bay
    - Kanairiktok River
  - Kaipokok Bay
    - Kaipokok River
      - Kaipokok River-North Branch
      - Kaipokok River-South Branch

=== Watersheds between Groswater Bay and Goose Bay in Labrador ===
- Labrador Sea
  - Groswater Bay
    - Tom Luscombe Brook
    - Goose Brook
    - Double Sea
    - Mulligan Bay
      - Mulligan River
  - Lake Melville
    - Sebaskachu River
    - Grand Lake
      - Naskaupi River
        - Red Wine River
        - Crooked River
      - Susan River
      - Beaver River (Grand Lake, Labrador)
      - Cape Caribou River

=== Watersheds of Goose Bay and of Churchill River in Labrador ===
- Labrador Sea
  - Goose Bay
    - Goose River
      - Peters River
      - Metchin River
  - Churchill River, flowing into Goose Bay
    - Lower Brook
    - Pinus River
    - Hamilton River
      - Cache River
    - Minipi River
    - Metchin River
    - Valley River
    - Unknown River
    - Elizabeth River
    - Big River
    - Shoal River
  - Traverspine River
  - Kenamu River
    - Little Drunken River
    - Salmon River
  - Kenemich River
  - English River, Labrador
- Sandwich Bay
  - North River
    - Ayre River
  - Sandwich River
    - White Bear River
    - Eagle River
    - Paradise River
    - Dyke River
  - Black Bear River, flowing in Black Bear Sea
  - Hawke River flowing in Hawke Bay
    - Northwest Feeder River
    - Main Brook
      - Southwest Feeder River
  - Gilbert Bay
    - Gilbert River
    - Shinneys River
  - Alexis Bay
    - Alexis River
  - St. Lewis Sound Bay
    - St. Lewis River
    - St. Marys River
    - St. Charles River

=== North shore of Belle Isle Strait (Gulf of St Lawrence) in Labrador ===
- Labrador Sea
  - Belle Isle Strait
    - Temple Bay
      - Temple Brook
    - Pinware River
      - Lost River
    - L'Anse au Loup Brook
    - Forteau Brook, flowing into Forteau Bay

=== List of rivers of Labrador flowing into Quebec ===
In order from East to West:

- Rivière de Blanc Sablon (Newfoundland-Quebec)
- Bujeault River
- Chanion Brook
- St Paul River
- Napetipi River
- River à la Mouche
- St Augustin River
  - Michaels River
  - Matse River
- Joir River
- Natashquan River
  - Mercereau River
- Kachekaosipore River
- Romaine River

== Newfoundland ==
=== South watershed Newfoundland ===
==== Avalon Peninsula ====
Rivers listed from West to East:

- Golden Bay (Newfoundland)
  - Big Gulch River
- Lance Cove
  - River Lance
    - Great Bulch Brook
    - Little Gulch Brook
- Branch Cove
  - Branch River
- Red Head River
- Little Barachois River
- Big Barachois River
- Little Salmonier River
- Mary's Bay
  - North Harbour Brook
- Colinet Harbour
  - Rocky River
  - Colinet River
- Salmonier Arm
  - Salmonier River
  - Little Harbour River
- Shoal Bay
  - Shoal Bay River
- Mall Bay (Newfoundland)
  - Ruisseau Mall Bay
- St. Mary's Harbour
  - Riverhead River
- Holyrood Pond
  - Crossing Place River
- Peter’s River
- Gull Island Brook
- Three Gully River
  - Shores River
- St Shotts River
  - Old Sams River
  - Tucker Bush River
- Arnolds Cove River
  - Saddle River (Newfoundland)
- Trepassey Bay
  - Caplin Cove River
  - Tartan Lane River
  - Brown River (Trepassey Bay)
  - Northwest Brook, Trepassey Bay
  - Northeast Brook, Trepassey Bay
  - Bar River (Newfoundland)
  - Stoney River, emptying into Mutton Bay
  - Biscay Bay River
  - Back Brook (Newfoundland)
  - Portugal Cove Brook
  - Whalens River
  - Wrights River
  - Drook River
  - Freshwater River (Newfoundland)
- Bristy Cove River
- Watern Cove River
- Long Beach River
- Cripple Cove River

==== East Coast of Newfoundland–Atlantic Ocean ====
In order from North to South:

- Robertson Gully River
- West Pouch Cove Brook
- Shoe Cove Brook
- Half Moon Brook
- Big River
- Pond Island Brooke
- North Pond Brook
- Kennedys Brook
  - Soldiers Brook
- Outer Cove Brook
- Coakers River
- Durkens River
- Rennie River
- Waterford River
- Leamys Brook
- Spear Bay Brook
- Petty Harbour River
- Yellow River
- Queen River
- The Spout River
- Bald Head River
- Broad Gully River
- Gunridge River
- Stanleys River
- Bay Bulls River
- Perrys Brook
- Witless Bay Brook
- Mobile River
- La Manche River
- Rearing Cove River
- Horse Chops Pond River
  - Birchy Hill River
- Cape Broyle River
  - North River
  - Southern River
- Beachy Cove River
- Freshwater River
- Jeffreys River
- Spout River
- Aquaforte River
- Old Woman Brook
- Chance Cove Brook
- Cape Race River
- Freshwater River on the Cape

==== Belle-Isle Strait–Newfoundland – Northwest shore ====
In order from North to South:

- Pincombes Brook
- Bauline River
- Discharge of Brocks Head Pond
- Main Millers Pond River
  - Northeast Pond River
    - Blast Hole Pond River
- Voiseys Brook
- Beachy Cove Brook
- Goat Cove Brook
- Broad Cove River
- Horse Cove Brook
- Topsail River
- Manuels River
- Conway Brook
- Kelligrews River
- Lower Gullies River
- Upper Gully River
- Seal Cove River
- Quarry Brook
- Mahers River
- Walls River
- Daniels River
- Maloneys River
- Avondale River
- Colliers River
- South River (Newfoundland)
- North River (Bay de Grave, Belle-Isle Straight)
- South River (Bay de Grave, Belle-Isle Straight)
- Shearstown Brook
- Ryans Brook
- South River (Newfoundland)
- Bannerman River
- Island Pond Brook
- Mosquito River (Canada)
- Blackhead Brook

Western Bay Brook Echre Pit Brook

Northern Bay Brook

==== Northern Peninsula of Newfoundland ====
- Castors River
- East River (Newfoundland)
- Torrent River (Newfoundland)
- River of Ponds (Newfoundland)
- Eastern Brook (St Pauls Inlet, Newfoundland)
- Bakers Brook (Newfoundland)
- Dear Brook, emptying in Eastern Arm
- Lomond River, emptying in East Arm
- Wallace Brook
- Trout River (Newfoundland Island)
- Gregory River (Newfoundland)
- Lower Crabb Brook
- Liverpool Brook
- Goose Arm Brook
  - Goose Arm North Brook
- Old Mans Brook
- Gillams Brook
- Hughes Brook (Newfoundland)
- Humber River (Newfoundland)
- Corner Brook (Newfoundland)
- Blow Me Down Brook
- Riley’s Brook
- Serpentine River (Newfoundland)
- Little River (Northern Peninsula, Newfoundland)
- Fox Island River
- Portland Creek River

==== By St George, west watersheds of Newfoundland ====
- Romaines Brook
- St Georges River (Newfoundland)
  - Little River (St Georges River, Newfoundland)
  - Bottom Brook (St Georges River, Newfoundland)
  - Harry's River (Newfoundland)
- Little Barachois Brook (St George’s Bay, Newfoundland)
- Flat Brook, Newfoundland, emptying in Flat Bay
- Fischells Brook
  - Robinsons River
- Middle Barachois River
- Crabbes River (Newfoundland)
  - Southwest Brook (Newfoundland)
- Highlands River
- Grand Codroy River
  - Brooms Brook
- Little Codroy River
- Barachois River (Cabot Straight, Newfoundland)

==== Watersheds of Fortune Bay west of Newfoundland ====
- Grand Bay River
- Isle aux Morts River
- Burnt Island Brook
- Rose Blanche Brook
- Northwest Brook (Garia Bay, Newfoundland)
- Garia Brook
- La Poile River
- Roti Brook
- Cinq Cerf Brook
- Couteau Brook
- Grandy Brook
- Kings Harbour Brook
- Bay de Loup Brook
- White Bear River (Newfoundland)
- Grey River (Newfoundland)
- Morgan Brook (Northwest Arm), Hare Bay, Newfoundland)
- Bottom Brook (Facheux Bay, Newfoundland)
- Espoir Brook (North Bay, Northern Arm, Newfoundland)
- Salmon River (East Bay, Baie d’Espoir, Newfoundland)
- Southeast Brook (Baie d’Espoir, Terre-Neuve)
- Conne River (Newfoundland), emptying in Espoir Bay
- Little River (Espoir Bay, Newfoundland)
- Old Brook (Newfoundland), emptying in Old Bay
- Salmon River (Cinq Islands Bay, Newfoundland)
- North West Brook (Newfoundland), emptying in North Bay
- Bay du Nord River (Newfoundland)
- North West Brook (East Bay, Newfoundland)
- North East Brook (East Bay, Newfoundland)
- Rencontre Brook, emtying in Rencontre Harbour
- Mal Bay Brook, emtying in Tickle Harbour
- Long Harbour River
  - Beaver Brook (Long Harbour, Newfoundland)
  - Kane Brook (Long Harbour, Newfoundland)
  - Schooner Brook
- Southwest Brook (Long Harbour, Newfoundland), emptying in Long Harbour
- Grand Brook Le Pierre, emtying in « Grand Le Pierre Harbour »
- Terrenceville Brook
- Ryle Barrisway Brook
- Salmonier Brook
- Sugarloaf Brook, emptying in Argent Bay
- Devil Brook
- Garnish River
- Muddy Hole Brook
- Famine Brook
- Little Barasway Brook
- Anse au Loup Brook, emptying in "Anse au Loup Barasway"
- Grand Bank Brook

==== Watersheds of the West coast of Newfoundland on the Gulf of St Lawrence ====
Rivers listed from North to South

- Lories Brook
- Piercey Brook
- Salmonnier River, emptying in Lamaline Bay
- Lawn River
- St Lawrence River, emtying in Little St Lawrence Harbour
- West Brook, Newfoundland, emptying in « Southwest Arm »
- Tides Brook, emptying in « Southwest Arm »
- Rushoon River, emptying in « Rushoon Harbour »
- Bay de l'Eau River
- Cape Roger Brook
- Black River
- Paradise River
  - Little Dunns River
- Sandy Harbour River
- Pipers Hole River
- Black River
- North Harbour River
- Comme By Chance River
- Jacks Pond Brook
- Maturin Brook
- Rottling Brook
- Ship Harbour Brook
- Northeast Arm River
- Southeast River
- Little Barasway River
- Cuslett Brook
- Muskrat Brook

== See also ==
- Rivers of the Americas
- List of rivers of Canada
