= Telecommunications in Newfoundland and Labrador =

Telecommunications in Newfoundland and Labrador have been important due to the province's rural and remote geography. They are also well-situated to be the terminus of transatlantic undersea communication cables since it was found by Lieutenant O.H. Berryman in 1853 that they are connected to Ireland by a plateau at a depth of 1500 to 2000 fathoms which is highly suitable for this purpose.
