= Research & Development Corporation Newfoundland and Labrador =

The Research & Development Corporation (RDC) was a Crown corporation of the Government of Newfoundland and Labrador created to improve the province's research and development performance.

== Mandate ==
The mandate of the Research & Development Corporation was to strengthen the focus, quantity, quality and relevance of research and development undertaken in the province and elsewhere for the long-term economic benefit of the province.

== Background ==
Early references to creating a Crown corporation focused on stimulating increased research and development in Newfoundland and Labrador are indicated in the Provincial Government's budget speech in 2007. In December 2008, The Research and Development Council Act was passed by the Government of Newfoundland and Labrador establishing the Research & Development Corporation as an arms-length provincial Crown corporation.

== Leadership ==
In December 2007, Glenn James was appointed CEO of the Research & Development Corporation. In his role as CEO, Mr. James was responsible for the development, operation and financial management of the RDC.

Janes served as founding CEO until 2017.

== Focus ==
The RDC was focused on sectors that are of strategic importance to the Province. Ocean technology and energy were initial areas of focus for increased R&D.

== Budget ==
The Research and Development Corporation was allocated $25 million through the Newfoundland and Labrador Budget 2009. $10 million was allocated for the Industrial Research and Innovation Fund (IRIF). This program funded research conducted at the province's post-secondary institutions and not-for-profit research centres and helps to improve the quality of research performed and to recruit and retain researchers.

== Innovate NL ==
In July 2017, the Government of Newfoundland and Labrador replaced the Research and Development Corporation with InnovateNL. All funding programs and services were integrated into the Department of Tourism, Culture, Industry, and Innovation.

Businessman Mark Dobbin will chair the 11-member InnovateNL council for a two-year term, while the new CEO will be the deputy minister of tourism, culture, industry and innovation.

== See also ==
- Newfoundland and Labrador
- Memorial University of Newfoundland
