= Newfoundland and Labrador Route 310 =

Highway in Newfoundland and Labrador, Canada

Route 310
- Road to the Beaches
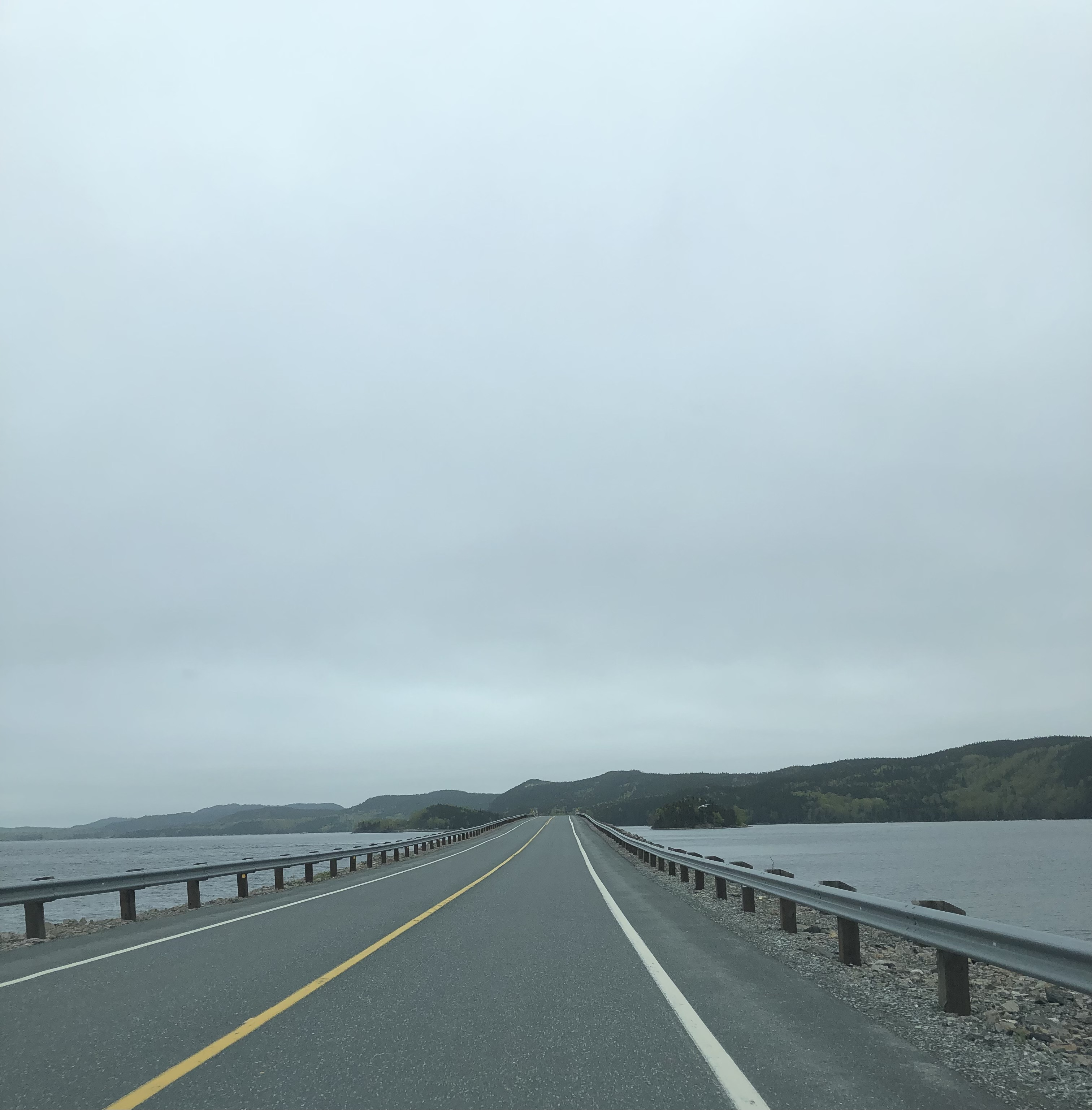

Route information
- Maintained by Newfoundland and Labrador Department of Transportation and Infrastructure
- Length: 37.0 km (23.0 mi)

Major junctions
- South end: Route 1 (TCH) (Exit 25) near Glovertown
- North end: Salvage

Location
- Country: Canada
- Province: Newfoundland and Labrador

Highway system
- Highways in Newfoundland and Labrador
← Route 301	→ Route 320

Route 310, also known as Road to the Beaches, in Newfoundland and Labrador runs from its southern terminus at Glovertown, and ends at its northern terminus at the community of Salvage, all along the Eastport Peninsula of Newfoundland. A portion of this route runs through Terra Nova National Park. The route is noteworthy for its beautiful sandy beaches, particularly in the towns of Eastport and Sandy Cove. The speed limit ranges from 60–70 km/h except when traveling through a community in which the speed is reduced to 50 km/h (30 km/h in Salvage).

Route 310 can also be accessed via an east access at Route 1 through Terra Nova National Park, though Route 310 officially starts in the town of Glovertown (at Exit 25).

== Route description ==
Route 310 begins in Glovertown at an interchange with Route 1 (Trans-Canada Highway, Exit 25). It heads east to pass through downtown and the harbour before crossing over a river into Traytown. The highway passes through town along Main Street, where it meets a local road leading to Cull's Harbour, local road into Terra Nova National Park, as well as meeting the East Access to Route 1. Route 310 now leaves Traytown and crosses a long Causeway to pass through Sandringham and Eastport, where the highway meets local roads leading to Happy Adventure, Sandy Cove, St. Chad's, Clay Cove, and Burnside. At Burnside, a ferry port services St. Brendan's. Route 310 now winds its way northeast up the coastline for several kilometres to enter Salvage, where it comes to a dead end.

== Major intersections ==
Location	km	mi	Destinations	Notes
Glovertown	0.0	0.0	Route 1 (TCH) – Clarenville, Gander, Grand Falls-Windsor	Exit 25 on Route 1; southern terminus
Traytown	9.3	5.8	Traytown Access Road (Route 310-11) To Route 1 (TCH) – Terra Nova National Park	
Traytown	9.5	5.9	Main Road (Route 310-13) - Cull's Harbour	
Traytown	11.9	7.4	East Access To Route 1 (TCH) – Terra Nova National Park	
Eastport	26.1	16.2	Church Street (Route 310-25) - Happy Adventure, Sandy Cove	
Eastport	26.2	16.3	Burdens Road (Route 310-32) - Clay Cove, St. Chad's, Burnside	Provides access to St. Brendan's Ferry at Burnside
Salvage	37.0	23.0	Dead End	Northern terminus
1.000 mi = 1.609 km; 1.000 km = 0.621 mi
