= Lower Cove =

Lower Cove may refer to:

- Lower Cove, Happy Adventure, Newfoundland and Labrador, Canada
- Ship Cove-Lower Cove-Jerry's Nose, Newfoundland and Labrador, Canada
- Lower Cove, Nova Scotia, Canada

== See also ==
- Lower Island Cove
