= Alexander Bay =

Alexander Bay may refer to:

- Alexander Bay, Newfoundland and Labrador in Canada
- Alexander Bay, Northern Cape in South Africa
- Alexander Bay Airport
- Alexander Bay Commando
- Alexander Bay Station
