= Salvage, Newfoundland and Labrador =

Coordinates: 48.687°N 53.6447°W

Salvage
- Town
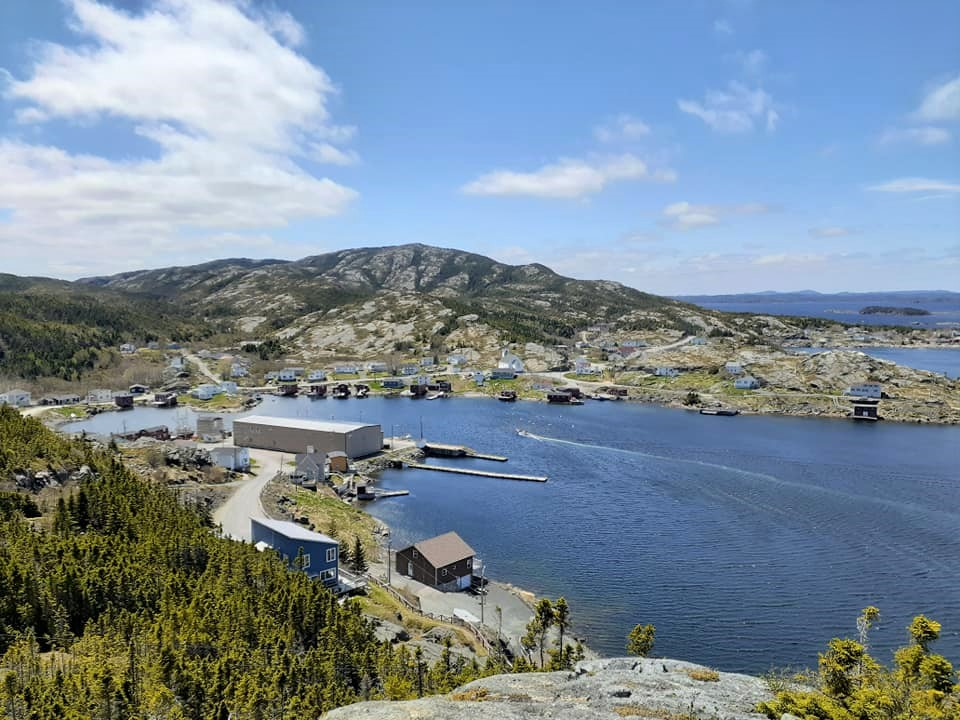
- Interactive map of Salvage
- Country: Canada
- Province: Newfoundland and Labrador

Population (2021)
  - Total: 108
- Time zone: UTC-3:30 (Newfoundland Time)
  - Summer (DST): UTC-2:30 (Newfoundland Daylight)
- Area code: 709
- Highways: Route 310

Salvage (/sælveɪdʒ/ sal-VAYJ) is a town located on the Eastport Peninsula of the Canadian province of Newfoundland and Labrador. The town had a population of 108 in the Canada 2021 Census.

CBC Radio host Michael Enright (The Sunday Edition) calls the 9 kilometres (5.6 mi) walk from Salvage to Eastport the most beautiful in the world.

== History ==
Historically and archaeologically, the Eastport Peninsula has been host to human settlements and activity for at least 5000 years by a variety of Indigenous cultural groups, including the Maritime Archaic, the later Groswater and Dorset, and most recently Beothuk peoples.

The name ‘Salvage’ is thought to have originated from the Spanish term ‘Salvaje’ meaning untamed, wild, or savage. Local pronunciation rhymes with "New Age", as in "Sal'vayge". This term was potentially used as a dated reference to the continued presence of Beothuk people in the area throughout the early contact period. An alternative theory on the origins of the name Salvage is that it made reference to its geographic location on the edge of rough waters, comparing it to the selvage, the end of cloth materials, but this theory is not as well grounded.

The earliest English documents referencing the area date to the second half of the 17th century, by which time English migratory fisheries in the area were well established.

There is some evidence to indicate early settlement in Salvage and its neighbouring communities as early as 1672, but any settlements dating to the late 17th and early 18th centuries were impermanent. The first permanent settlements on the Eastport Peninsula began to emerge in the 1780s in Salvage and Barrow Harbour, although the ancestors of present-day families did not arrive until about 1820.

As the central and most substantial settlement on the peninsula, one historic account describes Salvage as a spider's body connected to smaller nearby settlements by legs. Salvage today consists of two main harbours in a sheltered bay: Salvage Harbour and Bishop's Harbour. These two harbours, and other surrounding small communities were historically recorded as different towns, but are today amalgamated with Salvage. Throughout the 19th century the Eastport Peninsula enjoyed a period of stable growth, with Salvage reaching its peak population of 390 residents in 1891, with an additional 201 residents in the now amalgamated Bishop's Harbour.

Salvage, like most other outport settlements in Newfoundland, was founded in and by the fishing industry, beginning with the seasonal fishery before transitioning into a residential fishery. Throughout the 19th century the increasing population across Newfoundland increased pressure on local fish stocks, prompting many fishermen to turn their attention towards the Labrador fishery. This fishery took place over the summer months when fishermen would take schooners up to the Labrador coast, after which they would return to their outport towns in Newfoundland to prepare and preserve their catches over the fall. In the winter months people in Salvage participated in the seal fishery, in addition to logging work and boat construction.

Despite its apparent isolation as an outport settlement, people in Salvage were relatively well connected with the rest of Newfoundland for much of the 19th century by the migratory fishery. With the rise of residential fishing and the Labrador fishery, however, Salvage and its nearby communities lost a great deal of its regular seasonal visits from outside fishermen.

Without major roads or telegram lines installed, as Salvage and its neighbouring communities grew so did its need for communications and travel infrastructure to connect it with the rest of Newfoundland. Far from doing nothing about this, discussion for a telegraph line to be installed to better connect the Eastport to the rest of Newfoundland in the House of Assembly in 1907 reflected the community's desire for greater access to the political scene. Infrastructural projects throughout the 20th century, such as the nearby Trans-Canada Highway and Terra Nova National Park, helped mitigate this isolation and brought about a revitalised tourism industry to Salvage and neighbouring communities.

Throughout the 20th century Salvage, like many other remote Newfoundland communities, began to experience a decline in population in response to the decline of the Newfoundland fishery. By 1935, Salvage's population had declined to only 192, and Bishop's Harbour to 81, for a total population of 273.

A fishing community, Salvage had a fish processing plant which was destroyed by fire in 2001. A new plant was built and operated from 2002 to 2012.

== Demographics ==
In the 2021 Census of Population conducted by Statistics Canada, Salvage had a population of 108 living in 50 of its 100 total private dwellings, a change of −12.9% from its 2016 population of 124. With a land area of 15.85 km^{2} (6.12 sq mi), it had a population density of 6.8/km^{2} (17.6/sq mi) in 2021.

== See also ==
- List of cities and towns in Newfoundland and Labrador
- Eastport Peninsula
