= MV Nuliajuk =

Research ship built in 2011

History
- Name: Nuliajuk
- Builder: Glovertown Shipyard, Glovertown, NL
- Cost: $3.2 million
- Christened: 11 July 2011
- Maiden voyage: 15 July 2011
- Identification: IMO number: 9627277; MMSI: 316019354

General characteristics
- Tonnage: 121 GT
- Length: 19.5 m (64 ft 0 in)
- Speed: 10 knots (19 km/h; 12 mph)
- Capacity: 10 (maximum)
- Crew: 4

MV Nuliajuk, named for the Netsilik Inuit goddess Nuliajuk, is a multi-purpose research vessel owned and operated by the government of Nunavut in northern Canada.
