= Eastport Peninsula =

Peninsula in Newfoundland and Labrador, Canada

Coordinates: 48.64°N 53.82°W

Location of Eastport Peninsula in Newfoundland

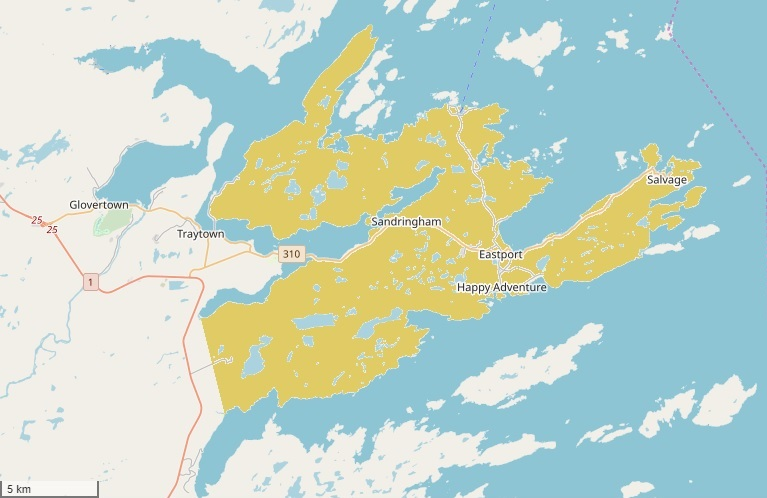
Map of Eastport Peninsula (gold)

The Eastport Peninsula is a small extension of land into the central part of Bonavista Bay in the Canadian province of Newfoundland and Labrador. The peninsula is adjacent to Terra Nova National Park and contains seven small communities: Eastport, Happy Adventure, Sandy Cove, Salvage, St. Chad's, Burnside and Sandringham.

== Geography ==
The Eastport Peninsula is a small peninsula in the central part of Bonavista Bay. The peninsula extends from Terra Nova National Park and follows an irregular coastline along Newman Sound to the south, around the community of Salvage, around Salvage Bay to the east and then following Damnable Bay, Morris Channel, Fair and False Bay, Bloody Reach and Northeast Arm on the north.

Lobster harvesting is restricted in the biologically productive waters around Eastport Peninsula, which are conserved within the Eastport Peninsula Lobster Management Area. Two areas of prime lobster habitat surrounding Round Island and the Duck Islands are designated a marine protected area and are "no-take" zones.

== Economy ==
Work in the region traditionally focused on the abundant natural resources. Inshore fishing, farming, and logging were still the chief source of employment for most of the inhabitants well into the 20th century. The lumber industry, however, faded away with the development of Terra Nova National Park in the 1950s. Happy Adventure is still a site of an operational fish plant (2017).

Being adjacent to Terra Nova National Park and having sandy beaches the Eastport Peninsula has become one of Newfoundland's most popular tourist destinations. The Eastport Peninsula is part of The Road to The Beaches tourism region.

The peninsula is home to the annual Winterset in Summer Literary Festival.

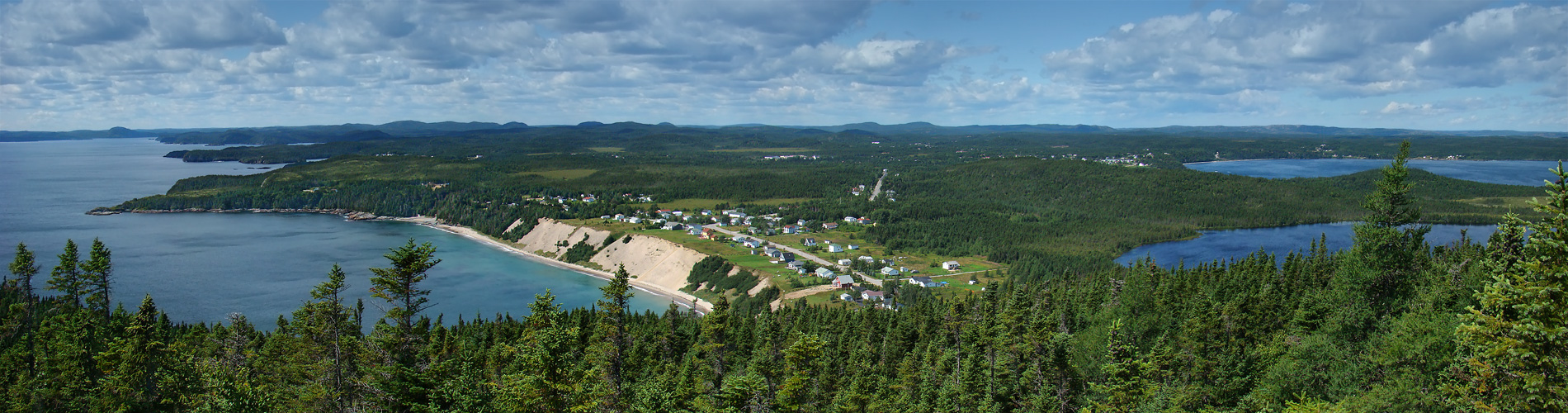
Panorama of Eastport Peninsula looking westward
