= Newfoundland and Labrador Route 301 =

Highway in Newfoundland and Labrador, Canada

Route 301
- Terra Nova Road

Route information
- Maintained by Newfoundland and Labrador Department of Transportation and Infrastructure
- Length: 17.5 km (10.9 mi)

Major junctions
- West end: Terra Nova
- East end: Route 1 (TCH) within Terra Nova National Park

Location
- Country: Canada
- Province: Newfoundland and Labrador

Highway system
- Highways in Newfoundland and Labrador
← Route 239	→ Route 310

Route 301, also known as Terra Nova Road, is a 17.5-kilometre-long (10.9 mi) east–west highway on the island of Newfoundland in the province of Newfoundland and Labrador. It serves as the only road connection to the town of Terra Nova, connecting with Route 1 (Trans-Canada Highway) within Terra Nova National Park at the other end.

Route 301 is entirely a very rough dirt road, and still has yet to be paved. The route starts off with a sharp right turn followed by sharp left turn, and is a relatively straight road afterwards, with a few slight bends. There are no other communities or junctions of any kind along the highway. In 2021, Terra Nova Road was voted Worst Road in Atlantic Canada by the Canadian Automobile Association's Worst Roads list.

== Major intersections ==
Location	km	mi	Destinations	Notes
Terra Nova	0.0	0.0	Fork in the road in downtown	Western terminus
Terra Nova National Park	17.5	10.9	Route 1 (TCH) – Clarenville, Gander, Grand Falls-Windsor	Eastern terminus
1.000 mi = 1.609 km; 1.000 km = 0.621 mi
