= Terra Nova, Newfoundland and Labrador =

Terra Nova New Land
- Town
- Location of Terra Nova in Newfoundland
- Coordinates: 48°30′N 54°13′W
- Country: Canada
- Province: Newfoundland and Labrador

Population (2021)
  - Total: 99
- Time zone: UTC-3:30 (Newfoundland Time)
  - Summer (DST): UTC-2:30 (Newfoundland Daylight)
- Area code: 709
- Highways: Route 301
- Website: https://townofterranova.ca/

Terra Nova is a town located southwest of Glovertown on the island of Newfoundland. It was served by the Canadian National Railway in the 1950s. The population in 2006 was 68, this from a historic low of just 28 in 1996. By 2016, the population had risen to 73, down slightly from the total of 83 recorded in 2011. There is a sizable leisure and summer population here seasonally as well as the stable permanent population.

Terra Nova is accessible from Route 1 (Trans-Canada Highway) via Route 301 (Terra Nova Road).

== Demographics ==
In the 2021 Census of Population conducted by Statistics Canada, Terra Nova had a population of 99 living in 52 of its 164 total private dwellings, a change of 35.6% from its 2016 population of 73. With a land area of 2.44 km^{2} (0.94 sq mi), it had a population density of 40.6/km^{2} (105.1/sq mi) in 2021.

== See also ==
- List of municipalities in Newfoundland and Labrador
