= Traytown =

- Town
- Location of Traytown in Newfoundland
- Coordinates: 48°39′40″N 53°58′42″W
- Country: Canada
- Province: Newfoundland and Labrador
- Census division: 7

Area
  - Total: 13.46 km^{2} (5.20 sq mi)

Population (2021)
  - Total: 279
  - Density: 20.1/km^{2} (52/sq mi)
- Time zone: UTC-3:30 (Newfoundland Time)
  - Summer (DST): UTC-2:30 (Newfoundland Daylight)
- Area code: 709
- Highways: Route 310

Traytown is a town in central Newfoundland, Newfoundland and Labrador, Canada. It is in Division No. 7 on Alexander Bay. Residents of Traytown seek services mainly in the town of Glovertown. Traytown does, however, have its own municipal council and businesses which include the Border Lounge, Whop-D-Doo Hair, K&K Ready Mix and many others. The community also has an outdoor rink and community playground which is maintained by town council as well as its volunteers. The name Traytown came from a surveyor that visited Traytown in the late 19th century. He thought that the landscape resembled a maze and named the town Troytown. This eventually was changed to Traytown over the years.

== Demographics ==
In the 2021 Census of Population conducted by Statistics Canada, Traytown had a population of 279 living in 136 of its 161 total private dwellings, a change of 4.5% from its 2016 population of 267. With a land area of 13.3 km^{2} (5.1 sq mi), it had a population density of 21.0/km^{2} (54.3/sq mi) in 2021.

== See also ==
- List of cities and towns in Newfoundland and Labrador
