= List of mammals of Newfoundland =

This is a list of mammal species recorded in the wild in Newfoundland, the island portion of the Canadian province of Newfoundland and Labrador. Only 14 known species (and one extinct species) are or were native to the island; this list is divided into native species and species introduced to the island since discovery by Europeans and colonization in the late 15th and early 16th centuries.

Several species native to Newfoundland are genetically distinct subspecies of more common species found elsewhere in Canada and North America.

== Native species ==
- Northern long-eared bat, Myotis septentrionalis
- Hoary bat, Lasiurus cinereus
- Little brown bat, Myotis lucifugus
- Newfoundland black bear, Ursus americanus hamiltoni
- Newfoundland beaver, Castor canadensis caecator
- Migratory woodland caribou, Rangifer tarandus caribou
- Ermine, Mustela erminea
- Red fox, Vulpes vulpes deletrix, silver and cross variants
- Arctic hare, Lepus arcticus bangsii
- Newfoundland lynx, Lynx canadensis subsolanus
- Newfoundland pine marten, Martes americana atrata
- Muskrat, Ondatra zibethicus obscurus
- Northern river otter, Lontra canadensis degener
- Meadow vole, Microtus pennsylvanicus terranovae

== Extinct species ==
- Newfoundland wolf, Canis lupus beothucus

== Naturally incoming species ==
- Labrador wolf, Canis lupus labradorius, apparent natural range expansion in early 21st century. There is no confirmed breeding population on the island.
- Coyote, Canis latrans, natural range expansion in the late 20th century
- Polar bear, Ursus maritimus, periodic appearances on the island in late winter or early spring

== Introduced species ==
- Eastern chipmunk, Tamias striatus, introduced in 1962
- Snowshoe hare, Lepus americanus, introduced around 1860
- American mink, Mustela vison, introduced for fur-farming in 1934
- Moose, Alces alces, introduced in both 1878 and 1904
- Eastern deer mouse, Peromyscus maniculatus
- House mouse, Mus musculus
- Brown rat, Rattus norvegicus
- Masked shrew, Sorex cinereus
- American red squirrel, Tamiasciurus hudsonicus, introduced in 1963
- Bank vole, Myodes glareolus, introduced in 1967
- Southern red-backed vole, Myodes gapperi
