= Burnside-St. Chads, Newfoundland and Labrador =

Burnside-St. Chads
- Local service district / designated place
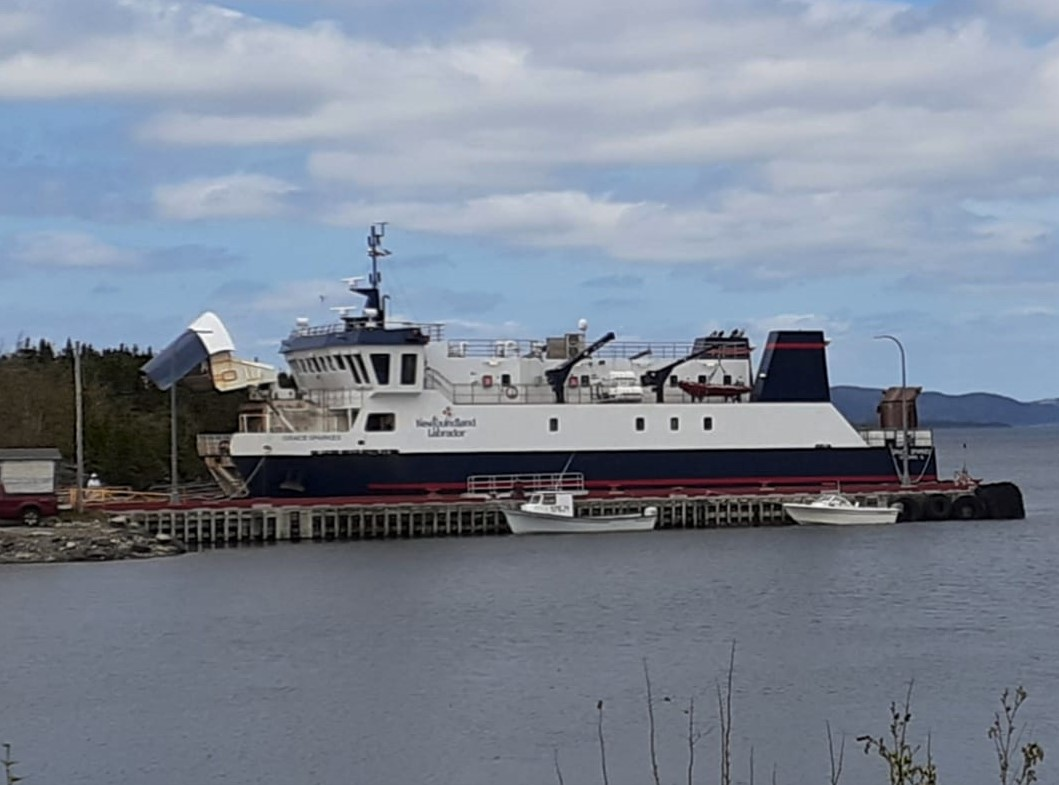
- The ferry to St. Brendan's docked in Burnside

- Location of Burnside-St. Chads Burnside-St. Chads (Canada)
- Coordinates: 48.699°N 53.786°W
- Country: Canada
- Province: Newfoundland and Labrador
- Region: Newfoundland
- Census division: 7
- Census subdivision: D

Government
  - Type: Unincorporated

Area
  - Land: 15.94 km^{2} (6.15 sq mi)

Population (2021)
  - Total: 79
- Time zone: UTC−03:30 (NST)
  - Summer (DST): UTC−02:30 (NDT)
- Area code: 709
- Highways: Route 310; Car Ferry to St. Brendan's

Burnside-St. Chads is a local service district and designated place on the Eastport Peninsula in the Canadian province of Newfoundland and Labrador. Burnside is located approximately 100km northeast of Clarenville. A port is located in Burnside through which the MV Grace Sparkes services the isolated island outport of St. Brendan's. Burnside-St. Chads had a population of 79 in the 2021 census.

== Geography ==
Burnside-St. Chads is in Newfoundland within Subdivision D of Division No. 7.

== Demographics ==
As a designated place in the 2016 Census of Population conducted by Statistics Canada, Burnside-St. Chads recorded a population of 95 living in 43 of its 135 total private dwellings, a change of 4.4% from its 2011 population of 91. With a land area of 15.94 km^{2} (6.15 sq mi), it had a population density of 6.0/km^{2} (15.4/sq mi) in 2016.

== Government ==
Burnside-St. Chads is a local service district (LSD) that is governed by a committee responsible for the provision of certain services to the community. The chair of the LSD committee is Albert Oldford.

== See also ==
- List of designated places in Newfoundland and Labrador
- List of local service districts in Newfoundland and Labrador
- Newfoundland outport
- St. Brendan's, Newfoundland and Labrador
