= Eastport, Newfoundland and Labrador =

Eastport Salvage Bay, Salvage New, Brighton
- Town
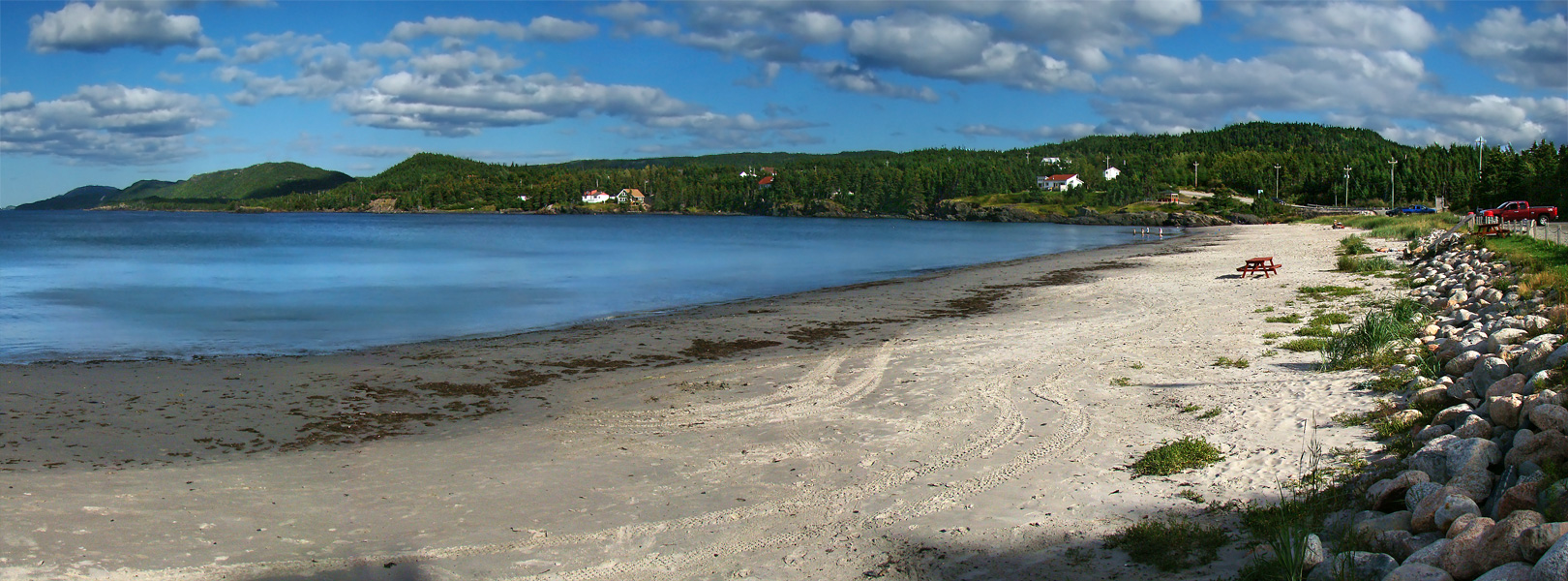
- Eastport Beach

- Seal
- Interactive map of Eastport
- Coordinates: 48°39′N 53°46′W
- Country: Canada
- Province: Newfoundland and Labrador

Government
  - Mayor: Genevieve Squire
  - MHA: Lloyd Parrott
  - MP: Clifford Small

Area
  - Land: 18.64 km^{2} (7.20 sq mi)

Population (2021 census)
  - Total: 462
  - Density: 26.9/km^{2} (70/sq mi)
- Time zone: UTC-3:30 (Newfoundland Time)
  - Summer (DST): UTC-2:30 (Newfoundland Daylight)
- Area code: 709
- Highways: Route 310
- Website: eastport.ca

Eastport is a town in the Canadian province of Newfoundland and Labrador. Eastport is located on the Eastport Peninsula of the island of Newfoundland, on the north-eastern border of Terra Nova National Park. It is a vacation destination known for its sandy beaches, scenery and traditional Newfoundland outport heritage.

== Demographics ==
In the 2021 Census of Population conducted by Statistics Canada, Eastport had a population of 462 living in 264 of its 364 total private dwellings, a change of −7.8% from its 2016 population of 501. With a land area of 18.48 km^{2} (7.14 sq mi), it had a population density of 28.5/km^{2} (73.9/sq mi) in 2021.

== Geography ==
Climate

Climate data for Nearby Terra Nova National Park
Month	Jan	Feb	Mar	Apr	May	Jun	Jul	Aug	Sep	Oct	Nov	Dec	Year
Record high °C (°F)	12.5 (54.5)	14.5 (58.1)	16.5 (61.7)	23 (73)	28.5 (83.3)	32.2 (90.0)	33 (91)	34 (93)	28.5 (83.3)	24 (75)	19.4 (66.9)	16.1 (61.0)	34 (93)
Mean daily maximum °C (°F)	−2.6 (27.3)	−2.8 (27.0)	1.2 (34.2)	5.8 (42.4)	11.9 (53.4)	17.1 (62.8)	21.4 (70.5)	21 (70)	16.4 (61.5)	10.2 (50.4)	4.8 (40.6)	−0.2 (31.6)	21.4 (70.5)
Daily mean °C (°F)	−6.8 (19.8)	−7.2 (19.0)	−3 (27)	2 (36)	7 (45)	11.8 (53.2)	16.1 (61.0)	16.1 (61.0)	12 (54)	6.6 (43.9)	1.6 (34.9)	−3.7 (25.3)	4.4 (39.9)
Mean daily minimum °C (°F)	−10.9 (12.4)	−11.6 (11.1)	−7.2 (19.0)	−1.8 (28.8)	2.2 (36.0)	6.5 (43.7)	10.8 (51.4)	11.2 (52.2)	7.6 (45.7)	2.8 (37.0)	−1.6 (29.1)	−7.2 (19.0)	0.1 (32.2)
Record low °C (°F)	−27.8 (−18.0)	−27.5 (−17.5)	−28.5 (−19.3)	−18 (0)	−9.4 (15.1)	−3.9 (25.0)	1 (34)	−2 (28)	−5 (23)	−8 (18)	−16.5 (2.3)	−22.8 (−9.0)	−28.5 (−19.3)
Average precipitation mm (inches)	105.7 (4.16)	107.3 (4.22)	99.7 (3.93)	82.3 (3.24)	87.6 (3.45)	88.2 (3.47)	88.3 (3.48)	88.7 (3.49)	108.6 (4.28)	110.6 (4.35)	105.9 (4.17)	110.9 (4.37)	1,183.7 (46.60)
Source: Environment Canada

== See also ==
- Eastport Peninsula
- Terra Nova National Park
