= Cull's Harbour =

Coordinates: 48.686°N 53.938°W

Location of Cull's Harbour in Newfoundland and Labrador

Cull's Harbour is a settlement in Newfoundland and Labrador.

Culls Harbour is located not far from Traytown and Glovertown in Newfoundland and Labrador. It has one road, named Main Road. Culls Harbour is home to about 60 residents.
