= St. Brendan's, Newfoundland and Labrador =

St. Brendan's Cottles Island
- Community
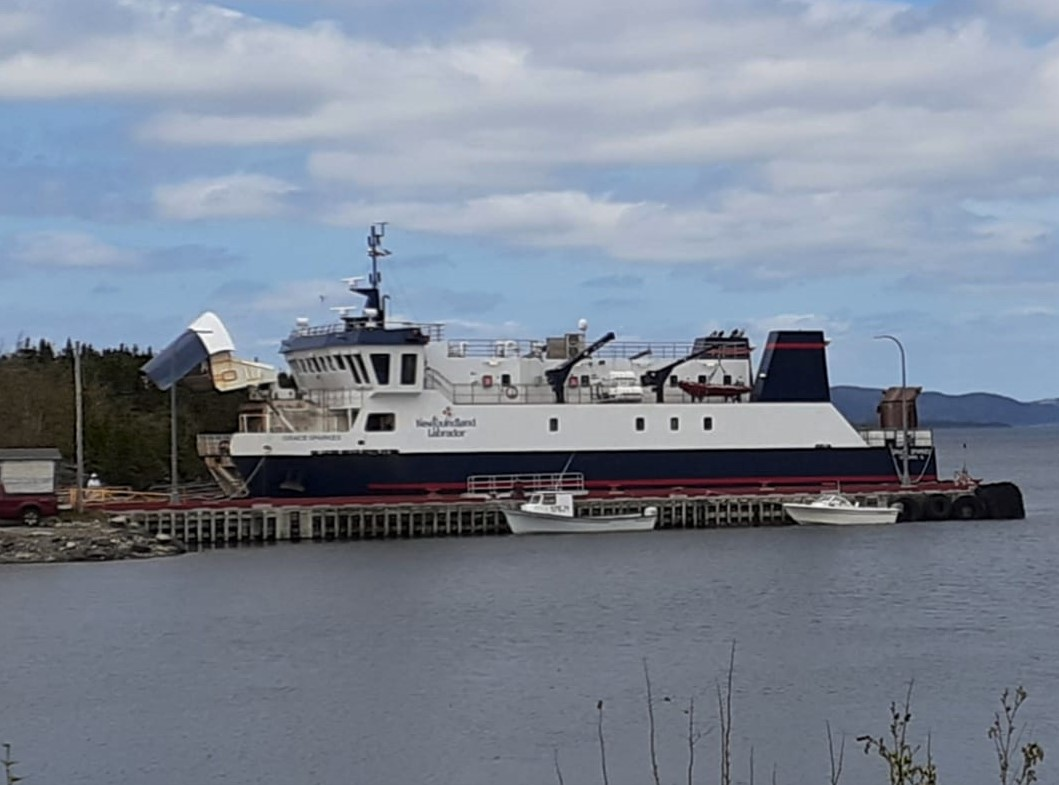
- Ferry to St. Brendan's
- Interactive map of St. Brendan's
- Coordinates: 48°51′29″N 53°39′58″W
- Country: Canada
- Province: Newfoundland and Labrador

Government
  - Mayor: Veronica Broomfield
  - MP: Jonathan Rowe (CON), Terra Nova—The Peninsulas

Population (2021)
  - Total: 125
- Time zone: UTC-3:30 (Newfoundland Time)
  - Summer (DST): UTC-2:30 (Newfoundland Daylight)
- Area code: 709
- Highways: Ferry to Burnside

St. Brendan's is a town in the Canadian province of Newfoundland and Labrador, situated in Shoal Cove (the town's former name) on Cottel Island in Bonavista Bay. Other settlements on the island include Shalloway Cove, Haywards Cove, and Dock Cove. The town had a population of 125 in the Canada 2021 Census. St. Brendan's is inaccessible by road and is served by a daily ferry service from Burnside.

St. Gabriel's All Grade is the only school in the community and in 2018 had only six students.

== Demographics ==
In the 2021 Census of Population conducted by Statistics Canada, St. Brendan's had a population of 125 living in 69 of its 122 total private dwellings, a change of −13.8% from its 2016 population of 145. With a land area of 9.76 km^{2} (3.77 sq mi), it had a population density of 12.8/km^{2} (33.2/sq mi) in 2021.

== See also ==
- Burnside-St. Chads, Newfoundland and Labrador
- List of cities and towns in Newfoundland and Labrador
- Newfoundland outport
