= Lower Cove, Nova Scotia =

Community in Nova Scotia, Canada

Coordinates: 45.719°N 64.434°W

Lower Cove is a small community located in Cumberland County, Nova Scotia, Canada. It is the site of historic sandstone quarrying and grindstone production.
