= Sandringham, Newfoundland and Labrador =

Sandringham
- Town
- Interactive map of Sandringham
- Coordinates: 48°39′32″N 53°49′39″W
- Country: Canada
- Province: Newfoundland and Labrador

Population (2021)
  - Total: 205
- Time zone: UTC-3:30 (Newfoundland Time)
  - Summer (DST): UTC-2:30 (Newfoundland Daylight)
- Area code: 709
- Highways: Route 310

Sandringham is a town on the Eastport Peninsula in Bonavista Bay North in the Canadian province of Newfoundland and Labrador, Canada. The town had a population of 205 in the Canada 2021 Census.

== Demographics ==
In the 2021 Census of Population conducted by Statistics Canada, Sandringham had a population of 205 living in 101 of its 120 total private dwellings, a change of −10.5% from its 2016 population of 229. With a land area of 9.57 km^{2} (3.69 sq mi), it had a population density of 21.4/km^{2} (55.5/sq mi) in 2021.

== See also ==
- List of cities and towns in Newfoundland and Labrador
