= Happy Adventure =

- Village
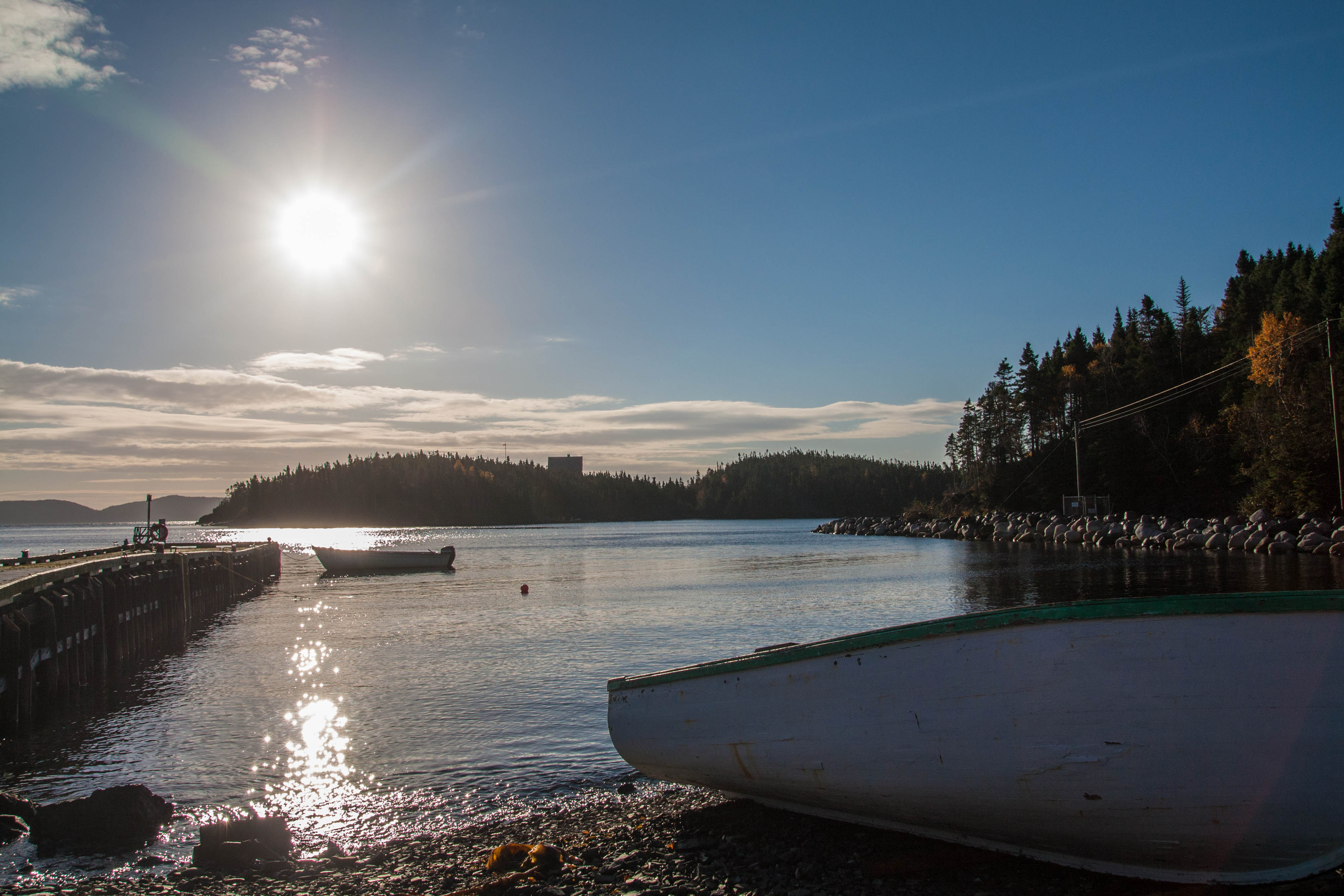

- Location of Happy Adventure in Newfoundland
- Coordinates: 48°38′10″N 53°45′35″W
- Country: Canada
- Province: Newfoundland and Labrador
- Census division: No. 7
- Settled: 1710

Population (2021)
  - Total: 183
- Time zone: UTC-3:30 (Newfoundland Time)
  - Summer (DST): UTC-2:30 (Newfoundland Daylight)
- Area code: 709
- Highways: Route 310

Happy Adventure is an outport village on the Eastport Peninsula in the Canadian province of Newfoundland and Labrador, first established in 1710. As of 2021, the population was 183.

== Geography ==
Happy Adventure consists of three well-defined inlets known locally as of Upper Cove, Little Sandy Cove, and Lower Cove (which also contains a smaller attached cove known as Powell's Cove).

== Etymology ==
The origin of the village name is a matter of some controversy. According to local lore, the name, which was first referenced in 1817, could have had any one of three origins. Some speculate it is a reflection of the joyful experience of the first settlers in finding such a welcoming environs. Alternatively, it has been postulated that the community was named to commemorate a ship belonging to 17th-century pirate Peter Easton. Still others suggest the community was named by George Holbrook, a British Admiralty hydrographer. Holbrook surveyed Newman Sound in 1817 and sheltered in one of Happy Adventure's coves during a storm.

== Demographics ==
In the 2021 Census of Population conducted by Statistics Canada, Happy Adventure had a population of 183 living in 59 of its 113 total private dwellings, a change of −8.5% from its 2016 population of 200. With a land area of 9.62 km^{2} (3.71 sq mi), it had a population density of 12.3/km^{2} (31.8/sq mi) in 2021.

== See also ==
- List of cities and towns in Newfoundland and Labrador
- Farley Mowat, Author of "The Boat Who Wouldn't Float". The boat's name is "Happy Adventure", also named in reference to the pirate ship mentioned above.
