= Damnable Bay =

Natural bay in Newfoundland and Labrador, Canada

Coordinates: 48.699°N 53.748°W

Damnable Bay is a natural bay off the island of Newfoundland in the province of Newfoundland and Labrador, Canada.
