= Sandy Cove, Newfoundland and Labrador =

Coordinates: 48°38′51″N 53°42′31″W

Sandy Cove
- Town
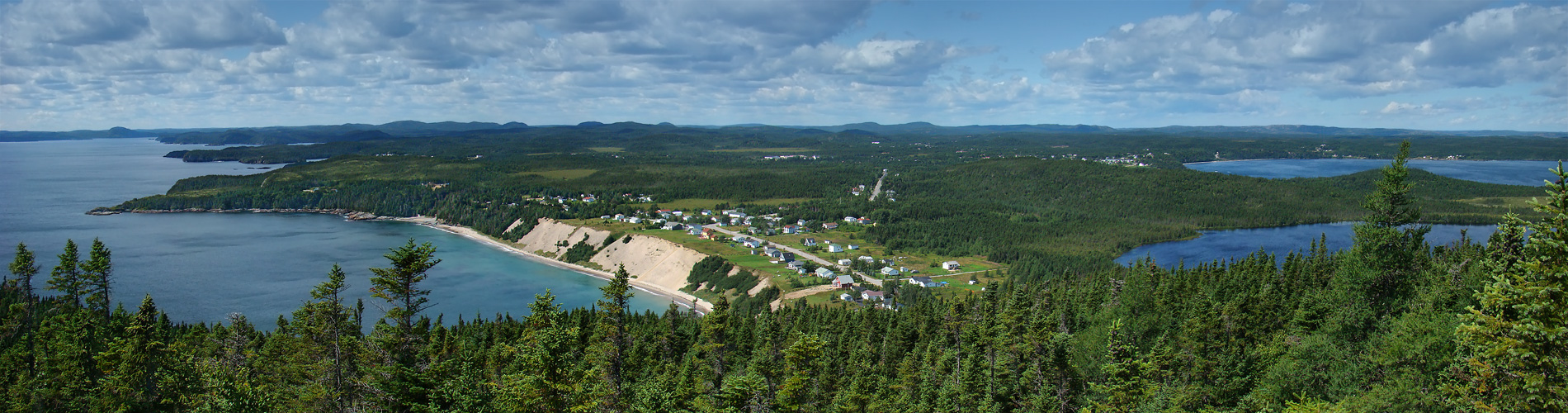
- Sandy Cove

- Location of Savage Cove-Sandy Cove in Newfoundland
- Country: Canada
- Province: Newfoundland and Labrador

Population (2021)
  - Total: 120
- Time zone: UTC-3:30 (Newfoundland Time)
  - Summer (DST): UTC-2:30 (Newfoundland Daylight)
- Area code: 709
- Website: Official website

Sandy Cove is a town located on the Eastport Peninsula in Newfoundland and Labrador, Canada. It is located on Newman Sound, which is part of Bonavista Bay. It had a population of 120 in the 2021 census.

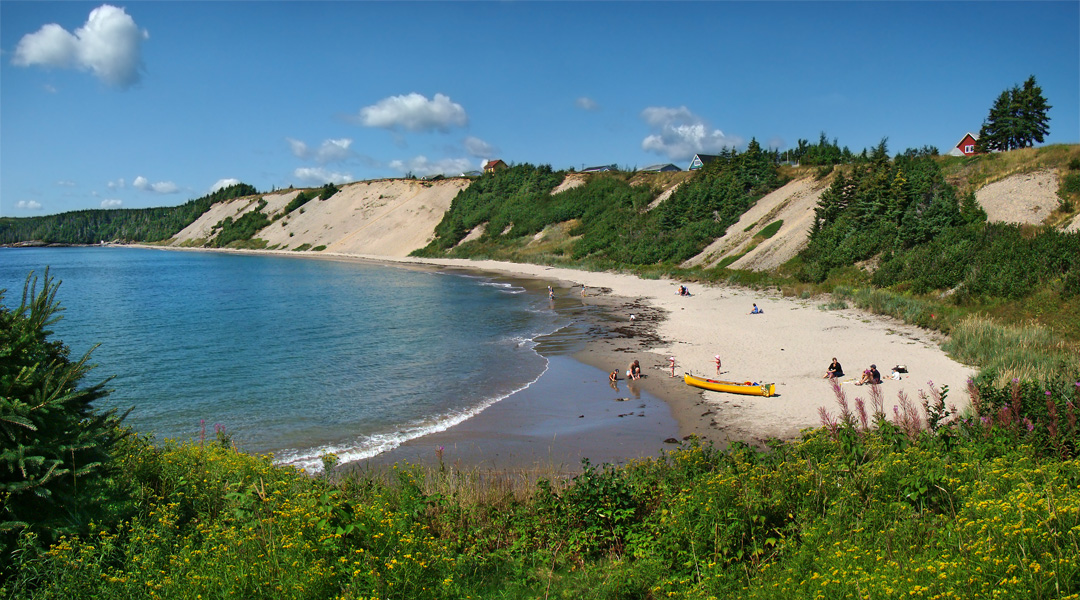
Sandy Cove Beach

== Demographics ==
In the 2021 Census of Population conducted by Statistics Canada, Sandy Cove had a population of 120 living in 56 of its 95 total private dwellings, a change of −1.6% from its 2016 population of 122. With a land area of 8.99 km^{2} (3.47 sq mi), it had a population density of 13.3/km^{2} (34.6/sq mi) in 2021.

== See also ==
- List of communities in Newfoundland and Labrador
