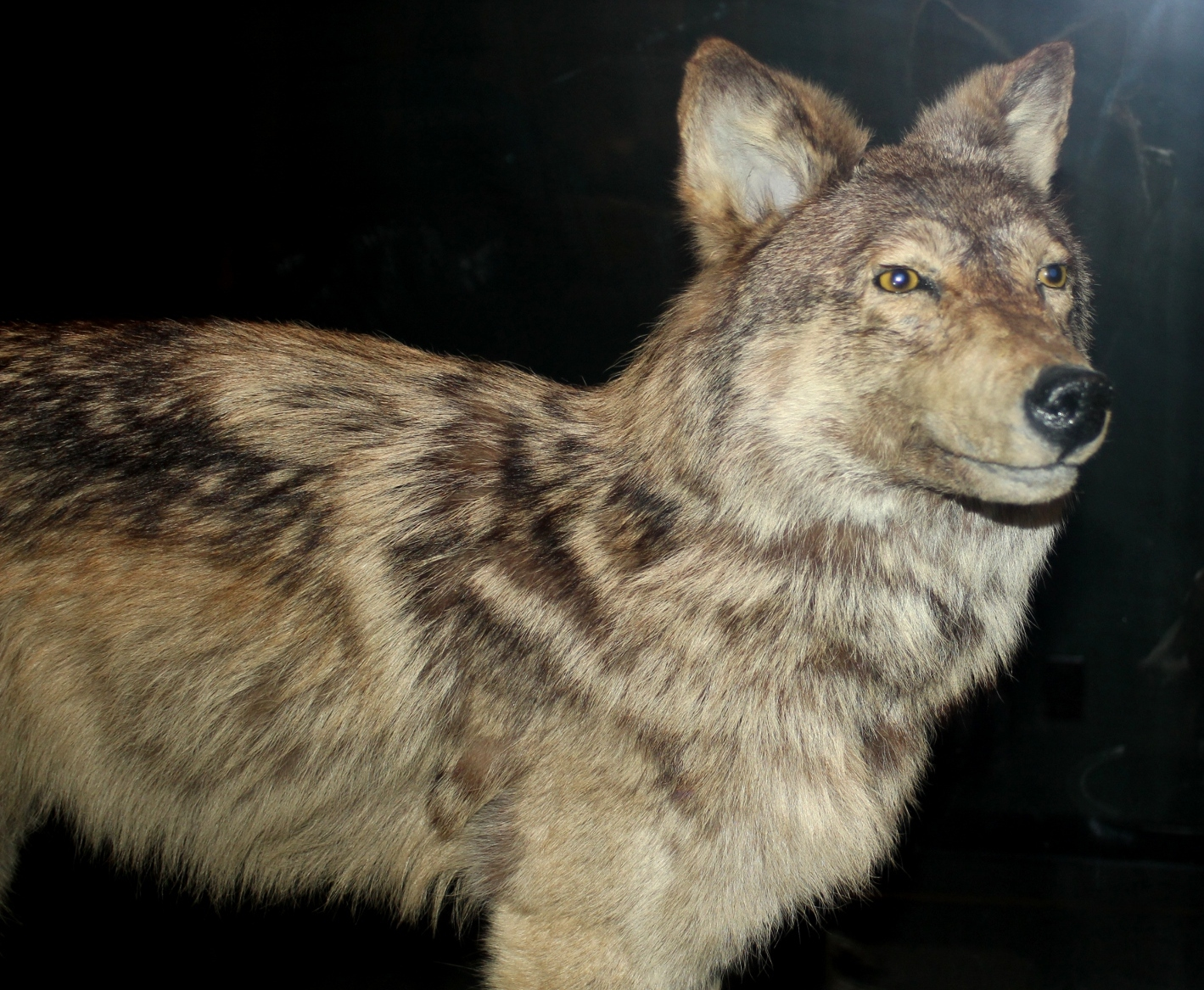
- Mounted specimen

Conservation status
- Extinct (1911) (IUCN 3.1)

Scientific classification
- Kingdom: Animalia
- Phylum: Chordata
- Class: Mammalia
- Order: Carnivora
- Family: Canidae
- Genus: Canis
- Species: C. lupus
- Subspecies: †C. l. beothucus

Trinomial name
- †Canis lupus beothucus Allen & Barbour, 1937
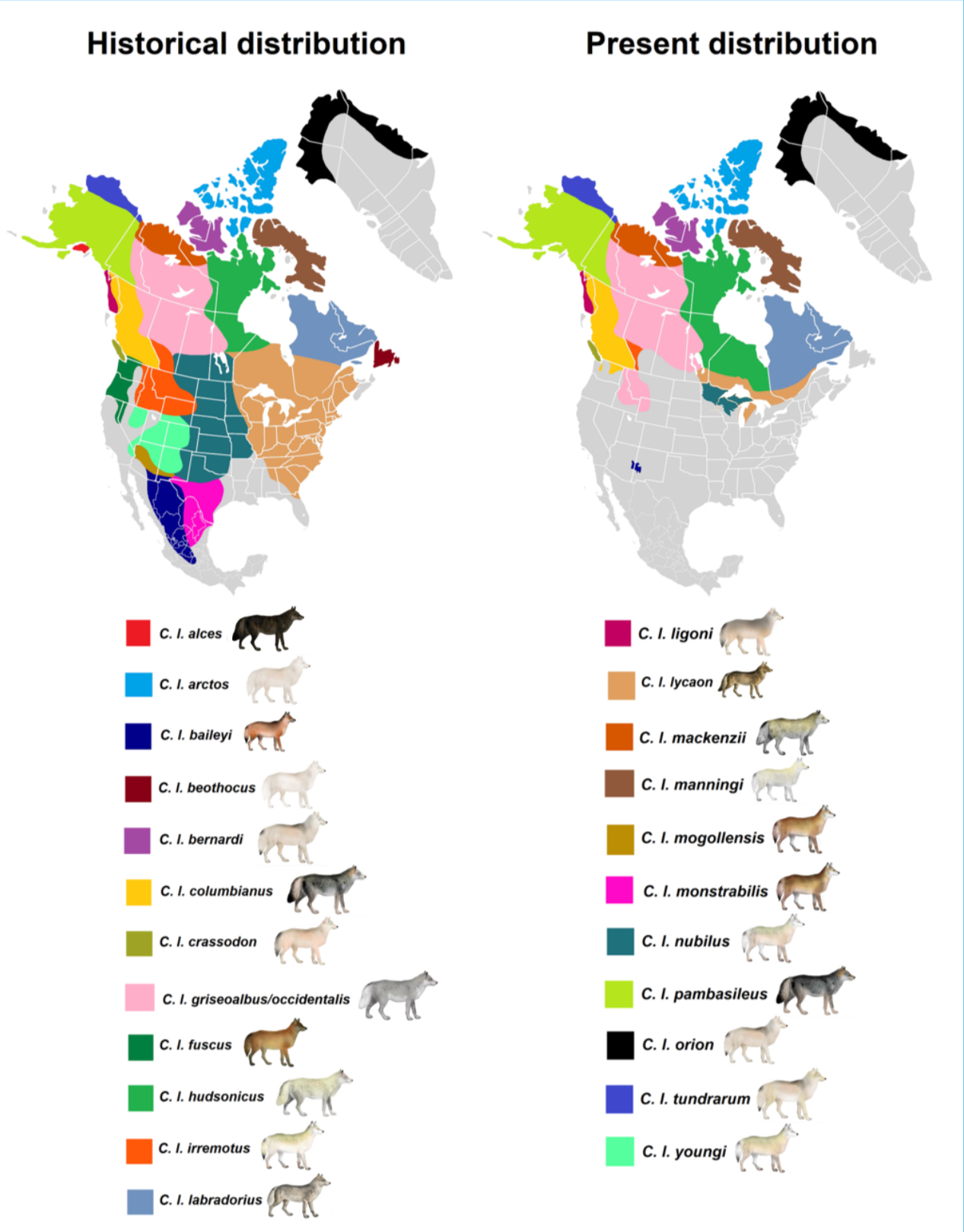
- Historical and present range of gray wolf subspecies in North America

= Newfoundland wolf =

Extinct subspecies of the gray wolf

The Newfoundland wolf (Canis lupus beothucus) is a subspecies of grey wolf that was native to Newfoundland. As a food source, the species would prey and rely on the Newfoundland caribou. During the autumn and early winter, some wolves would turn white while others remained dark enough to look black.

Remains of wolves have been discovered in L'Anse aux Meadows, a Norse settlement located in northern Newfoundland dating to c. 980–1020.

== Description ==
It was described as being a medium-sized, slender-skulled wolf with a white pelt, though melanists also occurred. In comparison to its mainland relatives it bears a striking difference in its internal accessory cusp angles allowing for distinction between subspecies. The last specimen was reportedly killed in 1911.

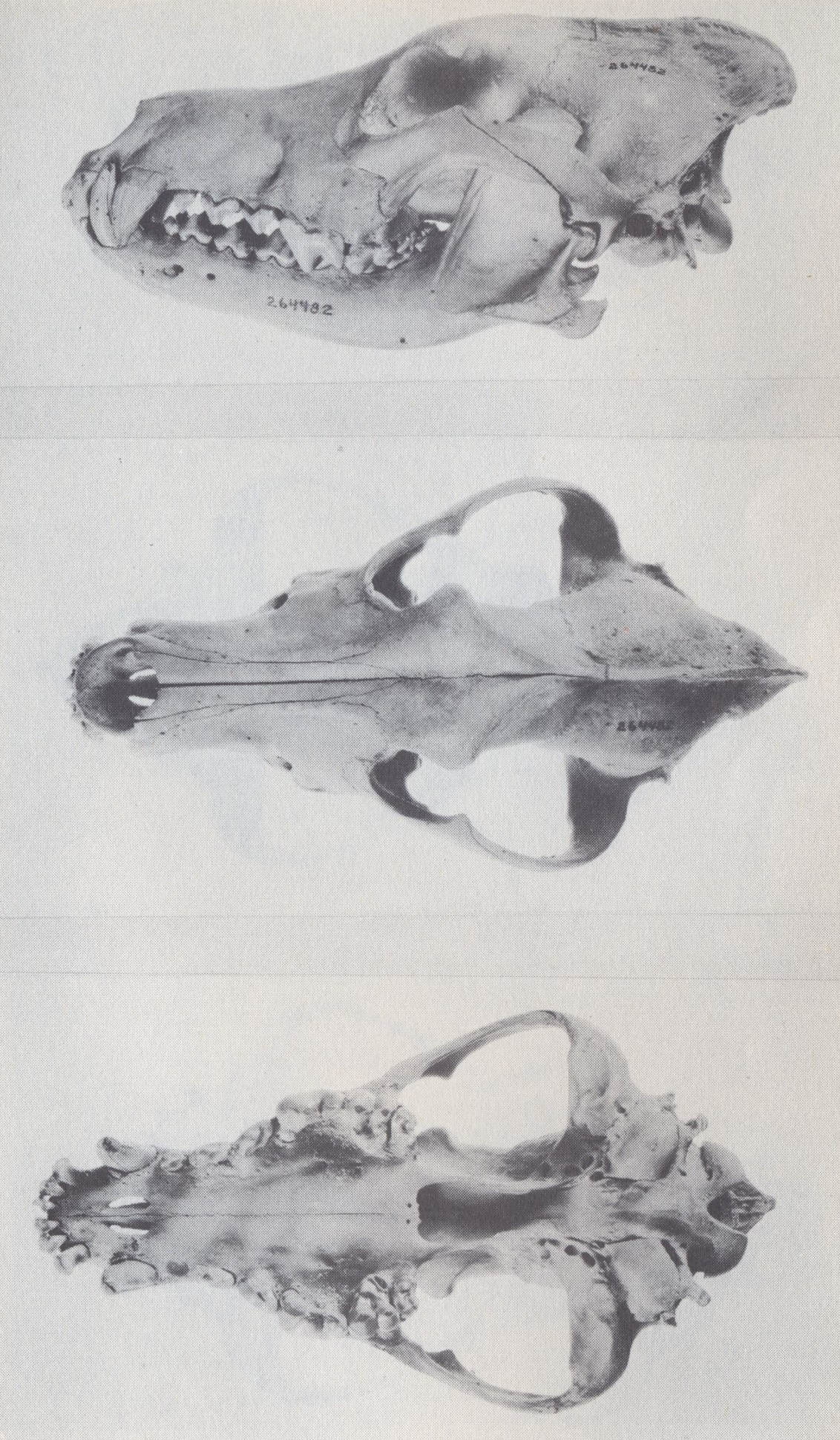
Skull

== Taxonomy ==
This wolf is recognized as a subspecies of Canis lupus in the taxonomic authority Mammal Species of the World (2005). In 1912, Gerrit S. Miller Jr have concluded that in North America, specifically west of the Mississippi River and Hudson Bay, and north of the Platte and Columbia rivers, there are three types of wolves: timber-wolf, plains-wolf, and tundra-wolf.

Around 10,000 years ago, the Laurentide ice sheet connected Newfoundland and Labrador together, allowing wolves from Labrador to colonise what became Newfoundland.

== Recent sightings ==
In 2019, a wolf was shot in Newfoundland after being confused for a coyote. DNA evidence found that the specimen, and a second wolf found on Newfoundland, to be a Labrador wolf, which are often seen in neighbouring Labrador but rare on Newfoundland.

== See also ==
- Labrador wolf
