= Alexander Bay Station =

Coordinates: 48°41′N 54°07′W

Alexander Bay Station was a Canadian settlement in the province of Newfoundland and Labrador.

The community contained a store as well as a telegraph and express office in 1911. It was in Bonavista District and was situated on the Clarenville Branch of the Newfoundland Railway.

It was located 181 miles from St. John's, 50 miles from Clarenville, west of Glovertown. The post office began on April 1, 1949, and was closed by September 13, 1966.

The bay was previously named Bloody Bay or Bloody Reach, after a conflict between European settlers and the Beothuk, but was later renamed after local merchant William Alexander.

== See also ==
- List of ghost towns in Newfoundland and Labrador
