= Terra Nova National Park =

National park in Newfoundland and Labrador, Canada

- Parc national Terra-Nova
- IUCN category II (national park)
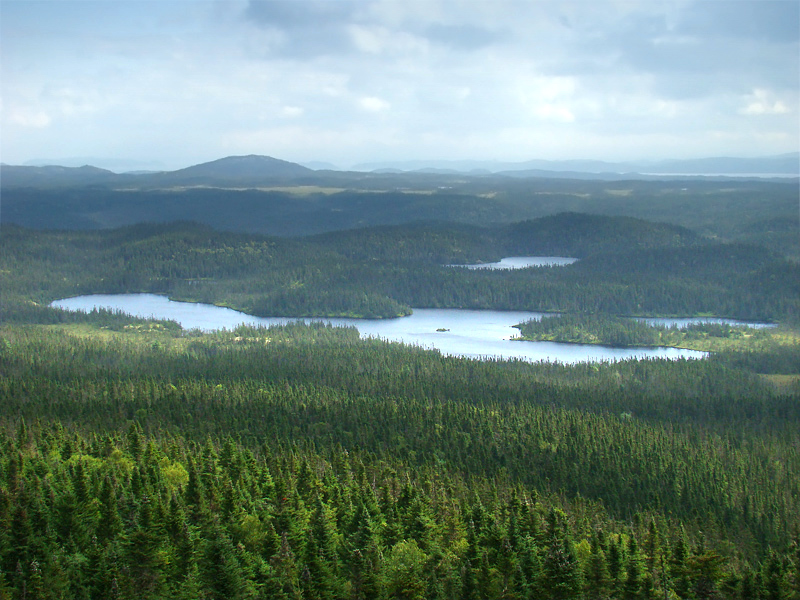
- View from Ochre Hill

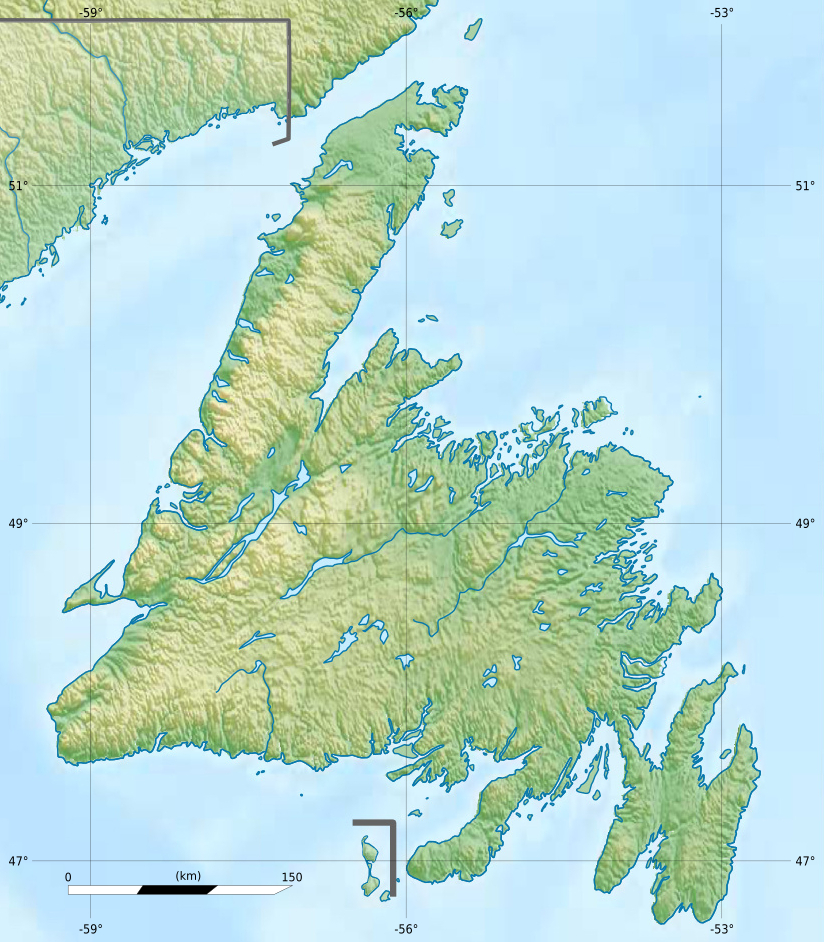
- Location within Canada Location within Newfoundland
- Interactive map of Terra Nova National Park
- Location: Sandringham, Newfoundland and Labrador
- Coordinates: 48°31′50″N 53°55′41″W
- Area: 399 km^{2} (154 sq mi)
- Established: 1957
- Visitors: 45,191 (in 2022–23)
- Governing body: Parks Canada

Terra Nova National Park is located on the northeast coast of Newfoundland in the Canadian province of Newfoundland and Labrador, along several inlets of Bonavista Bay. The park takes its name from the Latin name for Newfoundland; it is also the original Portuguese name given to the region.

Terra Nova's landscape is typical of the northeast coast of Newfoundland, but with remnants of the Appalachian Mountains contributing to widely varied and rugged topography throughout the region. The park's seacoast consists of several rocky "fingers" jutting into Bonavista Bay along an area stretching from just north of Port Blandford to the vicinity of Glovertown. The coastline varies from cliffs and exposed headlands to sheltered inlets and coves, contributing to Newfoundland's prime recreational boating area.

Inland areas consist of rolling forested hills, exposed rock faces, and bogs, ponds and wetlands. Wildlife protected by the park range from small to large land mammals, migratory birds, and various marine life. Terra Nova also protects an area containing remnants of the Beothuk Nation, as well as many of the early pioneer European settlements in the region.

Terra Nova National Park was established in 1957 and was the first National Park in Newfoundland and Labrador. Terra Nova protects the Eastern Island Boreal Forest natural region. This region covers most of the island of Newfoundland, east of Deer Lake, and is characterized by black spruce trees with pockets of balsam fir, white pine, mountain ash, tamarack, maple and other deciduous tree species.

== Activities ==
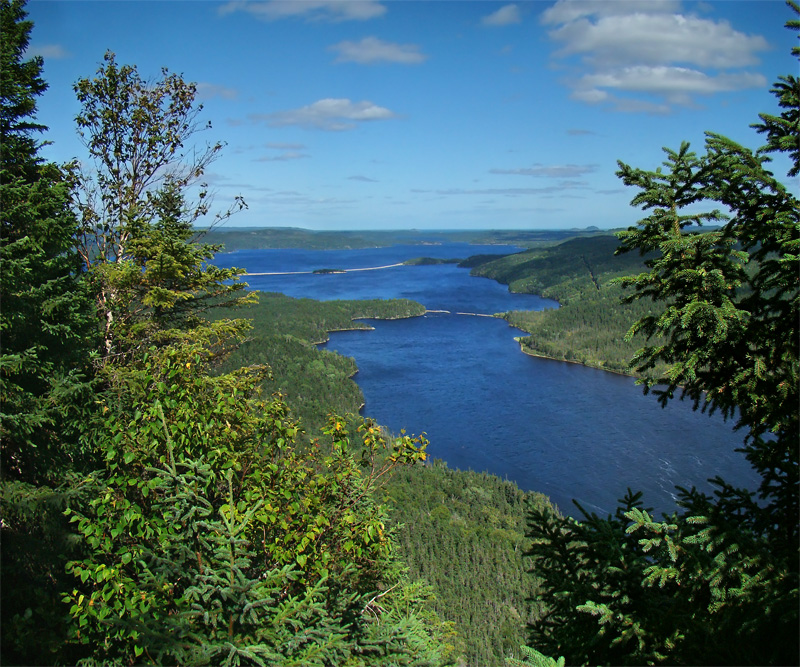
View from Malady Head

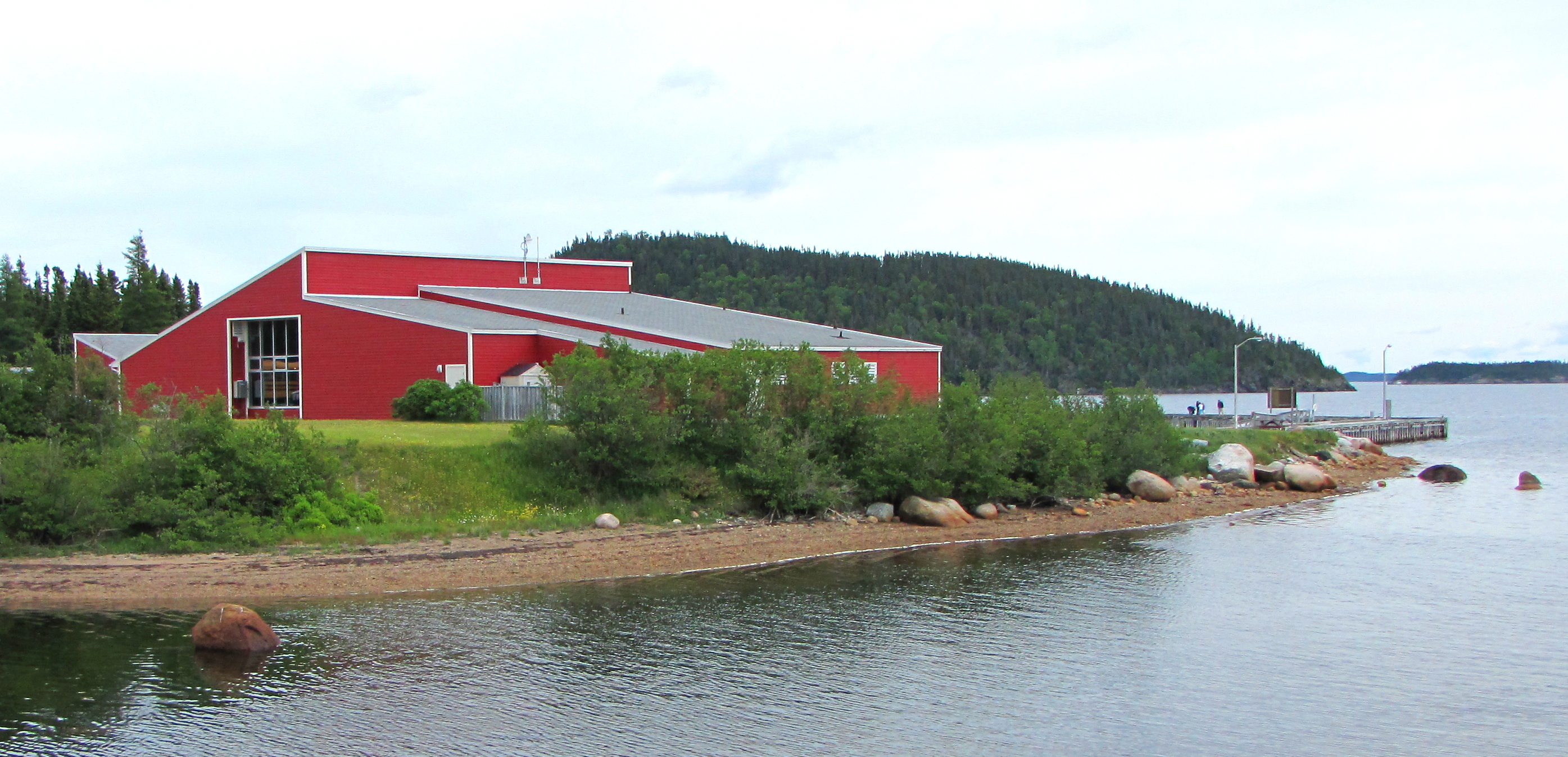
Visitor's Centre and dock

There are two campgrounds that offer front country camping: Newman Sound and Malady Head. There are also a number of backcountry camping areas that you can hike, canoe or kayak to. There are many trails in the park of varying length and difficulty. The main visitor centre is located at Salton's Brook.

During the summer there are a number of interpretive programs offered at Terra Nova. Almost every night there is a show at the Evening Theatre about the themes of the Park. Current shows include "Go With the Flo" and "Forest Idol". Previous shows include "Forest Feud" and "The Broad Cove Bachelor". Once a week there is also a campfire program at the campfire circle where you can listen to some sounds of Newfoundland while sipping hot chocolate. There are also a number of interpretive hikes that cover themes such as introduced species, forest fire, species at risk, and edible plants.

Other summer activities at the park include freshwater swimming and mountain biking.

There are a number of activities for kids. One of the more popular programs is the Junior Naturalist Program where children get stamps towards becoming a junior naturalist. There is also a Graduate Naturalist Program where older children get a workbook with many fun activities to complete.

Terra Nova also organizes and celebrates a number of special events. Some of the more popular include Canada Day (July 1), Kids day, Newfoundland and Labrador day, Take a Hike Day, Oceans Day (June 8).

Winter activities at the park include winter camping, snowshoeing and cross-country skiing.

== Fauna ==
Wildlife found in Terra Nova include: coyotes, Newfoundland black bears (an endemic subspecies to the island), moose, Newfoundland caribou (also an endemic subspecies to the island), black ducks, red foxes, beavers, bald eagles, red squirrels, river otters, lynxes, puffins, snowshoe hares, ospreys, pine martens, and minks. Marine animals that inhabit offshore are humpback whales, minke whales, fin whales, pilot whales, harp seals, orcas and dolphins.

== Geology ==
The park resides in what is termed Avalonia, named for the Avalon Peninsula, and associated with the Appalachian Orogen. The zone's western boundary is marked by the Dover Fault and the Hermitage Bay Fault. The eastern portion of the park is characterized by the Precambrian Connecting Point Group quartzite, slate, and greywacke. The Precambrian Musgravetown Group reddish sandstone, conglomerate, and argillite are exposed along the Trans Canada Highway, and westernmost portion of the park, sandwiching the Precambrian Love Cove Group sericite and chlorite schists. A Pleistocene ice cap flowed radially across the island, depositing glacial debris in the western part of the park.

== Climate ==
Climate data for Terra Nova National Park Headquarters (1971−2000)
| Month | Jan | Feb | Mar | Apr | May | Jun | Jul | Aug | Sep | Oct | Nov | Dec | Year |
|---|---|---|---|---|---|---|---|---|---|---|---|---|---|
| Record high °C (°F) | 12.5 (54.5) | 14.5 (58.1) | 16.5 (61.7) | 23.0 (73.4) | 28.5 (83.3) | 32.2 (90.0) | 33.0 (91.4) | 34.0 (93.2) | 28.5 (83.3) | 24.0 (75.2) | 19.4 (66.9) | 16.1 (61.0) | 34.0 (93.2) |
| Mean daily maximum °C (°F) | −2.6 (27.3) | −2.8 (27.0) | 1.2 (34.2) | 5.8 (42.4) | 11.9 (53.4) | 17.1 (62.8) | 21.4 (70.5) | 21.0 (69.8) | 16.4 (61.5) | 10.2 (50.4) | 4.8 (40.6) | −0.2 (31.6) | 8.7 (47.6) |
| Daily mean °C (°F) | −6.8 (19.8) | −7.2 (19.0) | −3.0 (26.6) | 2.0 (35.6) | 7.0 (44.6) | 11.8 (53.2) | 16.1 (61.0) | 16.1 (61.0) | 12.0 (53.6) | 6.5 (43.7) | 1.6 (34.9) | −3.7 (25.3) | 4.4 (39.9) |
| Mean daily minimum °C (°F) | −10.9 (12.4) | −11.6 (11.1) | −7.2 (19.0) | −1.8 (28.8) | 2.2 (36.0) | 6.5 (43.7) | 10.8 (51.4) | 11.2 (52.2) | 7.6 (45.7) | 2.8 (37.0) | −1.6 (29.1) | −7.2 (19.0) | 0.1 (32.1) |
| Record low °C (°F) | −27.8 (−18.0) | −27.5 (−17.5) | −28.5 (−19.3) | −18.0 (−0.4) | −9.4 (15.1) | −3.9 (25.0) | 1.0 (33.8) | −2.0 (28.4) | −5.0 (23.0) | −8.0 (17.6) | −16.5 (2.3) | −22.8 (−9.0) | −28.5 (−19.3) |
| Average precipitation mm (inches) | 105.7 (4.16) | 107.3 (4.22) | 99.7 (3.93) | 82.3 (3.24) | 87.6 (3.45) | 88.2 (3.47) | 88.3 (3.48) | 88.7 (3.49) | 108.6 (4.28) | 110.6 (4.35) | 105.9 (4.17) | 110.9 (4.37) | 1,183.8 (46.61) |
| Average rainfall mm (inches) | 39.0 (1.54) | 36.1 (1.42) | 46.3 (1.82) | 57.1 (2.25) | 83.8 (3.30) | 87.3 (3.44) | 88.3 (3.48) | 88.7 (3.49) | 108.6 (4.28) | 107.2 (4.22) | 82.9 (3.26) | 47.5 (1.87) | 872.8 (34.37) |
| Average snowfall cm (inches) | 67.6 (26.6) | 72.3 (28.5) | 53.8 (21.2) | 24.6 (9.7) | 3.8 (1.5) | 0.9 (0.4) | 0.0 (0.0) | 0.0 (0.0) | 0.0 (0.0) | 3.4 (1.3) | 22.9 (9.0) | 61.8 (24.3) | 311.1 (122.5) |
| Average precipitation days (≥ 0.2 mm) | 13.0 | 12.5 | 13.8 | 13.3 | 16.2 | 14.8 | 14.0 | 14.2 | 15.0 | 16.1 | 15.5 | 15.1 | 173.5 |
| Average rainy days (≥ 0.2 mm) | 4.3 | 4.3 | 7.9 | 10.2 | 15.7 | 14.8 | 14.0 | 14.2 | 15.0 | 15.9 | 12.8 | 7.0 | 136.1 |
| Average snowy days (≥ 0.2 cm) | 9.5 | 9.4 | 7.7 | 4.5 | 1.0 | 0.15 | 0.0 | 0.0 | 0.0 | 0.72 | 3.5 | 19.4 | 55.87 |
Source: Environment Canada

== See also ==
- National Parks of Canada
- List of National Parks of Canada
- Parks Canada
- List of mammals of Newfoundland
