= Glovertown =

Glovertown Bloody Bay, Alexander Bay, Saunders Cove, Angle Brook
- Town
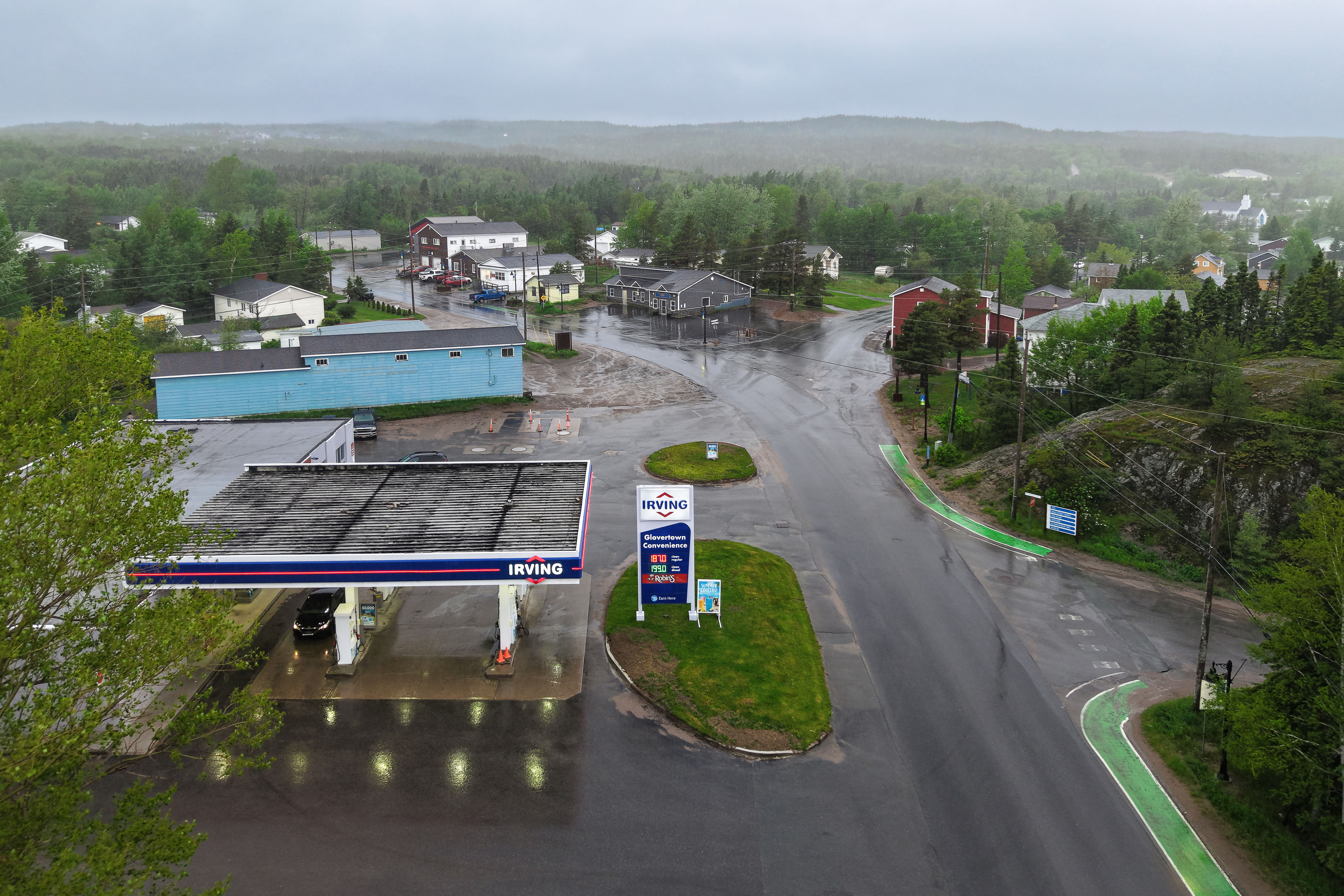
- Glovertown in 2026

- Seal

- Location of Glovertown in Newfoundland
- Coordinates: 48°40′N 54°03′W
- Country: Canada
- Province: Newfoundland and Labrador
- Census division: 7
- Settled: early 1800s

Area
  - Total: 70.33 km^{2} (27.15 sq mi)

Population (2021)
  - Total: 1,948
  - Density: 29.6/km^{2} (77/sq mi)
- Time zone: UTC-3:30 (Newfoundland Time)
  - Summer (DST): UTC-2:30 (Newfoundland Daylight)
- Postal codes: A0G 2K0
- Area code: 709
- Highways: Route 1 (TCH); Route 310
- Website: Glovertown official site

Glovertown is a town in northeastern Newfoundland, Newfoundland and Labrador, Canada. It is in Division No. 7 on Alexander Bay.

== History ==
Originally, Glovertown was called Bloody Bay. That name dated back to the 18th century and supposedly it referred to a massacre of a family of 11 by Beothuk natives that were living in the area at the time. The town was renamed Alexander Bay in 1894. During 1894, a section of railway was being built in the area. A few years later, the town was renamed to Glovertown, its current name, after Sir John Hawley Glover who served as the governor of Newfoundland from 1876 to 1881 and from 1883 to 1885.

The first settlers of Glovertown appeared in the early 19th century. In 1845, 12 people lived there. By 1857, there were only 10; by 1862 there were only eight. Then in 1869, the population jumped up to 80 and Glovertown started to become a thriving center for the fishery, boat building and lumbering industries. By 1891, there were 288 residents and the population had grown to 408 by 1911.

Separate settlements had been established by that time in the Saunders Cove to Northwest Arm area. Presently these areas are part of Glovertown.

On July 2, 1913, one of the sawmills located at Rosedale exploded and six people were killed. By 1935 there were 842 people living in the Glovertown area; 160 in Glovertown North, 325 in Glovertown Center, 53 in Angle Brook, 24 in Glovertown South and 24 in Alexander Bay. This population fluctuated in the coming years. The population continued to fluctuate for the next 11 years, until the forest fire of 1946.

In 1946, there was a fire that was started by sparks coming from a passing train. The fire destroyed 46 homes and left families homeless. Two schools, several businesses and 150 square miles (390 km^{2}) of timber were also destroyed during the fire. The lumber industry has never recovered from this loss.

Eventually people from Greenspond, Flat Island, Bragg's Island, and Gooseberry Island began to resettle to Glovertown and the influx of new people brought new industries to the town, including dairy and construction.

By 1971, the population of Glovertown was 1,915 and in 1981 it was 2,165. The Glovertown Regional High School was built in 1957 and an elementary school was built next to it in 1975. In 1998, both of the schools were joined to create present-day Glovertown Academy.

== Demographics ==
In the 2021 Census of Population conducted by Statistics Canada, Glovertown had a population of 1,948 living in 822 of its 972 total private dwellings, a change of −6.5% from its 2016 population of 2,083. With a land area of 69.85 km^{2} (26.97 sq mi), it had a population density of 27.9/km^{2} (72.2/sq mi) in 2021.

== See also ==
- List of cities and towns in Newfoundland and Labrador
