= NunatuKavummiut =

Indigenous peoples in Newfoundland

Nunatuĸavummiut (People of Nunatuĸavut)
Total population
- ~6,000

Regions with significant populations
- Central and southern Labrador (Canada)

Languages
- Newfoundland English

Religion
- Christianity (Protestantism, Evangelicalism), Animism

Related ethnic groups
- Inuit, European Canadians

- Person: Nunatuĸavummiuk
- People: Nunatuĸavummiut
- Language: Inuttut; Uukturausingit

NunatuKavummiut (or People of NunatuKavut) are an Indigenous collective (Note: The group has been described as an Aboriginal group and Aboriginal community by the Court of Appeal of Newfoundland and Labrador, and as an Indigenous collective by a memorandum of understanding signed with the federal government. While recognized by the federal government as eligible to apply for Indigenous rights, the status of Indigenous collective does not grant such rights itself.) who trace their descent from Inuit and European people in central to southern Labrador. They have also been called the Southern Inuit, Inuit-Métis and Labrador Métis. (Note: Kennedy says,"The NCC refers to its approximately 6,000 members as 'Southern Inuit.' However, NCC members interviewed by Pace (2008), Kelvin (2011), and myself in 2013 appear more comfortable calling themselves Métis. In this rapidly changing political landscape, I use Inuit-Métis, a term that acknowledges both their mixed origins and their Inuit ancestry." Prior to 2010, the term Labrador Métis was also used.) While some NunatuKavummiut have used the term Métis (meaning "mixed" in French), they are unrelated to the Métis Nation of Western Canada. (Note: The 1996 report of the Royal Commission on Aboriginal Peoples noted that the NunatuKavummiut were unique in being Métis who were descended from Inuit rather than First Nations peoples. The Court of Appeal of Newfoundland and Labrador found that the NunatuKavummiut would be eligible to apply for Indigenous rights ("a credible claim") based on either a claim of Inuit or Métis status.)

According to the NunatuKavut Community Council (NCC), the NunatuKavummiut span 24 communities across NunatuKavut, forming a majority in many of those, and most still partake in traditional livelihoods such as hunting, fishing, trapping, and berry collecting. The NunatuKavut Community Council's proposed land claims mostly cover central and southern Labrador.

The NCC (formerly the Labrador Métis Nation) signed a memorandum of understanding with the federal government in 2019, though this does not grant Indigenous rights in itself. It is also an associate member of the Congress of Aboriginal Peoples. The NCC and its approximately 6,000 members have not been recognized by the Nunatsiavut Government, the Inuit Tapiriit Kanatami, or the Inuit Circumpolar Council. The Court of Appeal of Newfoundland and Labrador said the NunatuKavummiut had a "credible but [as yet] unproven" case for Indigenous rights.

== Terminology ==
Nunatuĸavut or NunatuKavut means "Our Ancient Land" in the traditional Inuttitut dialect of central and southern Labrador. The NunatuKavummiut (literally "the People of Our Ancient Land") have also been known as the South-central Labrador Inuit, Southern Inuit of NunatuKavut, Southern Labrador Inuit, Labrador Inuit-Métis and Labrador Métis. The NCC was previously known as the Labrador Métis Association (1985) and the Labrador Métis Nation (1998).

=== Changing usage ===
Until the 1970s, the terminology used for the People of NunatuKavut was often applied by outsiders. Exonyms for the peoples today comprising the NunatuKavummiut have included Anglo-Esquimaux, Esquimaux, Labradorians, livyeres, planters, Settlers or mixed settlers, Southlanders, and more pejorative terms such as half-breeds and half-castes (some of which had also been used to refer to other groups, such as the Métis Nation and Kablunângajuit).

Around 1975, some south-central Labradorians of Inuit and European heritage began to use the term Métis, which means "mixed" in French, to replace the use of derogatory terms such as half-breed. The term became more popular after the formation of the Labrador Métis Association in 1981, and its incorporation in 1985. Even then, not all NunatuKavummiut used Métis, and the term sometimes caused confusion with the mixed Indian-European Métis Nation – an unrelated Indigenous group based in West Canada. Additionally, many of the Indigenous people of south-central Labrador called themselves Inuit or used both names interchangeably. (Note: According to the 1996 Report of the Royal Commission on Aboriginal Peoples, Volume 4, most NunatuKavummiut identified themselves as Métis in the 1991 Aboriginal peoples survey, but a significant number had previously identified themselves as Inuit or Innu on census forms, based on their ancestry. Recent census data shows most inhabitants of NunatuKavut continue to use Métis as their self-designation for official purposes.) This has led to combined terms such as Inuit-Métis also being used. Ultimately, the name of the community was changed, in 2010, to Southern Inuit of NunatuKavut or NunatuKavummiut to avoid confusion and better reflect the identity of its members.

== History ==
=== Arrival in southern Labrador ===
There has been general scholarly agreement that Inuit were active in southern Labrador from at least the point of European first contact in the 1550s until the 1760s, when the area came under effective European control. (Note: Kennedy says: "As detailed in Kennedy (2014a; 2014b; and 2015), prevalent thinking of the time about the supposed absence of Inuit along the southeastern Labrador coast was supported by one group of academics in the fine collection edited by Martijn and Clermont (1980). At the time, however, little actual archaeological excavation or ethnographic research had occurred in the region. Since then, the excavations by archaeologists Marianne Stopp, Lisa Rankin, and others, as documented in this volume and in Kennedy (2015), show beyond doubt that Inuit had occupied southeastern Labrador year-round as early as the late 16th century. Similarly, land claim research by the NCC (2010) and my own ethnographic and archival research revealed that my local informants had Inuit ancestry." Most scholars agree that Inuit lived, at least intermittently, in year-round settlements in southeast Labrador. Others claim a more persistent presence. Rollmann suggests that at least some of these settlements were the result of seasonal migration from the north, and that the British attempted to keep the Inuit north of Hamilton Inlet. Stopp suggests there was a pattern of settlement and dispossession, where Inuit would occupy land in the south, only to be forced out by Europeans, with several attempts to found new settlements over time.) Many settlements were inhabited throughout the year. Sod houses dating from the early- to mid-16th century have been identified in Sandwich Bay, such as on Huntingdon Island. Communal houses were inhabited by as many as five or six families and tents were used in the warmer seasons. Occupation was likely much more extensive and consistent than that, as most NunatuKavummiut lived a transhumant semi-nomadic way of life until the mid-1900s.

=== Contact with Europeans ===
Southern Inuit groups are recorded as being in conflict with the Basque and French whalers beginning in the mid-1500s; later they traded with these groups until the French were excluded from the region following the Treaty of Paris (1763). Europeans did not have separate communities but lived with the local Inuit and adopted Inuit customs and traditions. The presence of some Iberian and French surnames among south-central Inuit families, attested among Roman Catholic church records, probably relates to early unions with these Basque and French settlers.

Most contact with Europeans after this point was with British men, who mostly came alone or in small groups, and without wives. From as early as the 18th century, there are reports of British (and occasionally Irish) men cohabiting with Inuit women, leading to the development of a Southern Inuit community. These unions would sometimes be formalized by visiting clergy.

Although influenced in many ways by prolonged contact with European seasonal workers and merchants, the Southern Inuit culture and way of life retained distinctly Inuit traditions. (Note: Rankin, Boudoin and Brewster write: "The blended culture pattern that emerged from the union of Inuit and European populations maintained strong ties to Inuit traditions, and it is the enduring legacy of the Inuit of southern Labrador that has defined the Inuit-Métis culture from the eighteenth to the twenty first century." Beaudoin has argued that mixed communities are often assumed to be Europeans who have "gone native" or Natives who have become assimilated, which makes them invisible in the historical record. He says the effect of this is to overestimate European populations and influences, while underestimating Indigenous ones. See also:) The Southern Inuit often traded with European merchants, fishers and fur traders, with items from Italy, England, France and elsewhere discovered at archeological sites. European items were often adapted and customized by the Southern Inuit to better suit their purposes. The Moravian Church missionaries who arrived in the north during the 1770s also did not settle in southern Labrador.

Between 1830 and 1870, the number of permanent British settlers slowly increased (most working for the Hudson's Bay Company or fur and fish traders), creating new generations of mixed Inuit-Europeans. Along the southern coast, these newly emerging Inuit-Europeans, who would become known as the Labrador Métis, developed their own distinct culture, with genealogies that have been traced back to the time of the earliest British arrivals.

The Labrador Métis saw themselves as distinct from their northern Inuit and European neighbors (and were seen as such by non–Inuit-Métis people), but still recognized their Inuit heritage, much like the Kablunângajuit in the north. (Note: A Kablunângajuk (singular of Kablunângajuit), also called a Settler, is a person of mixed Inuit-European ancestry, or a person of non-Inuit ancestry who lived in the Nunatsiavut claimlands prior to 1940, or a descendant of these people. Kennedy states that "Northern Labrador Settlers are often related and similar to people called Inuit-Métis, except in where they lived". For more on the relationship between the northern Inuit, Kablunângajuk, and Inuit-Métis, see also:) They used European tools, but adapted them like their Inuit neighbors. They practised a mix of Christian and Inuit religious traditions, albeit less formally than those under the remit of the Moravian Church. They also ate different food from the Europeans, with significantly more seal and local animals, like the Inuit. The construction, layout and contents of their homes also distinguished them from both European and Inuit houses in south-central Labrador. One well documented Labrador Métis sod house was the home of an English trader, Charles Williams, and his Métis (Scots-Inuit) wife, Mary. The house was constructed in the mid- to late-19th century and was inhabited perhaps as late as 1915.

Methodist visitors to south-central Labrador noted the differences between the Indigenous groups of the north and those of the south. As missionaries, they disapproved of the apparent polygamy practised by the southern-central Inuit. They also disapproved of the European "heathens" they found there, whose Indigenous partners they disparaged as "concubines". Lambert De Boilieu documented similar encounters with south-central "Esquimaux" communities, in which he detailed their lengthy breastfeeding, their hunting traditions, and their spiritual and religious beliefs. Scholar Stephen Hay suggests that the Labrador Métis became the majority population of southern Labrador at some point during the 19th century, and describes the integration of Inuit women, in particular, within British households. Non-Métis Inuit populations are also recorded throughout the 20th century. Ethnographer E. W. Hawkes recorded the presence of Inuit at Sandwich Bay in the early 20th century called Netcetumiut ("People of the Sealing-Place") and at Battle Harbour called Putlavamiut ("People from the Big Stone Trap" or "People from the Place with the Treacherous Water"). Kennedy described Labrador as having a "continuum" of "Inuitness", ranging from European to Inuit-European to Inuit.

While the Labrador Métis had many similarities with the northern Kablunângajuit group (both groups also shared the name Settlers), scholars have suggested that stigma against Indigenous people led many mixed Inuit-Europeans in the south to hide their ancestry until the latter half of the 20th century. Many adopted English, with the last native speaker of Inuttut in south-central Labrador thought to have died around the 1900s. Despite this, they retained a consistent culture throughout the 19th and early 20th century, until Newfoundland and Labrador joined the Canadian Confederation in March 31, 1949. Moreover, they were never completely divided from the northern Inuit, as communities on the north and south coasts were often related and still retain these family connections today. (Note: Kennedy notes that many Nunatsiavut members today are Settlers/Kablunângajuit, "with or without Inuit ancestry", who are legally Inuit and otherwise indistinguishable from their southern Labrador Métis peers. He also notes that many Labradorian Inuit and Inuit-descendants were rejected or had their membership revoked by the LIA (the precursor to the Nunatsiavut government) because they did not have a connection to the Nunatsiavut claimlands area, or because they lived "far south of the LIA's boundaries". The Labrador Metis Association (now the NCC) was thus able to recruit many of these individuals. Members of the same family can sometimes be divided because of land claims and membership policies.)

=== NunatuKavummiut today ===
After the British Dominion of Newfoundland became part of the Canadian Confederation, the Kablunângajuit were incorporated into the recognized Inuit groups, but the Southern Inuit were not. Subsequently, during the 1960s, these groups were encouraged by the provincial government's resettlement policy to move to population hubs such as Cartwright, Mary's Harbour, and Port Hope Simpson, thus leaving their traditional homes behind and disrupting their practices. These groups were largely unrepresented until the 1980s, when the Labrador Métis Association (LMA) was established to represent the Southern Inuit and Labrador Métis. The organization changed its name to the NunatuKavut Community Council in 2010, reflecting the historic name of their shared Southern Inuit ancestors, the NunatuKavummiut. (Note: In "Equally Recognized? The Indigenous Peoples of Newfoundland and Labrador", Sébastien Grammond suggests the Labrador Inuit Association (Nunatsiavut)'s exclusion of Inuit-descended people living in south and central Labrador may have been influenced by politics, since Canadian and international military personnel were stationed in Labrador at the time. p. 485: "Geographical isolation may have also played a role in the acceptance of the [Nunatsiavut] Inuit-Settler alliance by the governments. By restricting the area of its land claim to northern Labrador, the LIA excluded persons of Inuit ancestry living in central and southern Labrador, whose Indigenous identity had received less outside recognition and whose claims may have been viewed as more threatening to military and resource development interests". p. 495: "Moreover, when the 'designated communities' system was put in place after Confederation, only northern communities were designated, reflecting and reinforcing the view that there were no Indigenous peoples in southern Labrador. Yet, as one observer noted, the latter 'had just as much Inuit blood [as] and shared a similar way of life' with their northern counterparts, which raises the question: Who is the appropriate comparator group?")

NCC figures from 2007 suggest that almost all NunatuKavummiut have retained traditional practices such as hunting, fishing, collecting wood, and harvesting today; and almost two-thirds still trap. The NunatuKavummiut community has continued to be affected by developments in the NunatuKavut area, and as a result the NCC has campaigned about local issues which may impact the livelihoods of its members. They have been affected by loss of traditional hunting territory and the decline in native wildlife, such as the caribou. In recent years, they have also attempted to engage with mining companies exploiting the area's mineral resources, such as iron. These efforts have been hampered by the lack of federal recognition. In 2023, Newfoundland and Labrador Premier Andrew Furey apologized to survivors of residential schools at an event in Cartwright.

== Distribution ==
Map with the location of the main NunatuKavut communities

The traditional territory of the NunatuKavummiut consists of a region of southern shore of Lake Melville and southern Labrador that encompasses communities from Mud Lake in southeast Lake Melville to the modern border of Labrador and Quebec. The NCC represents 24 communities in NunatuKavut, and the NunatuKavummiut are the majority in many of these. Across these communities, the NunatuKavummiut are still engaged in their traditional livelihoods. According to the NCC's 2007 figures, more than 90% of NunatuKavummiut hunt, fish for food, and collect their own wood. Nearly all NunatuKavummiut also harvest local vegetation such as berries, and 70% still trap.

=== NunatuKavummiut communities ===
According to the NCC, the 24 towns and villages in Newfoundland and Labrador with NunatuKavummiut communities are:

- L'Anse Amour
- L'Anse-Au-Clair
- L'Anse-Au-Loup
- Black Tickle-Domino
- Capstan Island
- Cartwright
- Charlottetown
- Churchill Falls
- Forteau
- Happy Valley-Goose Bay
- Labrador City–Wabush
- Lodge Bay
- Mary's Harbour
- Mud Lake
- Norman's Bay
- North West River
- Paradise River
- Pinsent's Arm
- Pinware
- Port Hope Simpson
- Red Bay
- St. Lewis
- West St. Modeste
- Williams Harbour

== Organization and membership ==
In 1981, the Labrador Métis Association (LMA) was created by the inhabitants of central and southern Labrador then known as livyeres (Note: Meaning someone who lives permanently in the area and lives by trapping, trading and fishing.) or Settlers, (Note: Settler, when capitalized, refers to people who were of mixed Indigenous-European heritage, or at least lived in mixed Indigenous-European communities, who developed a culture distinct from either Indigenous or European people, but who nevertheless retained significant Indigenous culture. In southeastern Labrador, these people continued the traditions of their Inuit forebears while integrating elements of European culture as well.) who were similar to the Kablunângajuit of the north, (Note: Meaning "partly white", the term Kablunângajuit refers to Settlers or Inuit-Europeans in northern Labrador.) to gain recognition as a distinct ethnocultural group. These were primarily people of Inuit and European heritage, although membership was, at that time, open to people of any Indigenous descent (including those of First Nations heritage).

In the 1970s and 1980s, two other Indigenous groups – the Native Association of Newfoundland and Labrador (now the Qalipu First Nation) and the Labrador Inuit Association (now the Nunatsiavut) – were attempting to appeal to the large population of Labradorian Settlers to expand their own numbers, but focused on those in the north of the region. Those in the south, who had traditionally resisted identifying as Inuit due to social stigma, felt they were not represented by either group.

By the early 1980s, many Southern Inuit were unable to gain membership in the Labrador Inuit Association due to where they or their ancestors had been born, despite their Inuit ancestry. Others, such as Doris Saunders, were accepted and then later expelled from one or both groups based on factors such as where they lived, despite having family members accepted by one of these organizations. (Note: Doris Saunders described herself as "a native Labradorian of Inuit, Indian and white descent, a Labrador Settler".) When the LMA was founded, many of these southeast and central Labradorian Settlers joined. The Settlers had to have mixed Indigenous (Note: The LMA initially admitted those Settlers with either Inuit or First Nations heritage, while the LIA excluded those with First Nations heritage. Settlers of mixed First Nations–European heritage typically joined the NANL as the more "Indian" organization of the three.) and European heritage, or only European heritage if they had lived in the area from before 1940. (Note: The northern Settlers were considered Indigenous, much like the Métis Nation, because theirs was an endogamous community which had intermarried with Indigenous populations and hence underwent ethnogenesis as a distinct people of mixed heritage. Many proponents of the NunatuKavummiut claims for Indigenous rights have argued that the same standard should apply to the southern and central Settlers who joined the NCC. Many southern Labrador Settlers are related to families in the north whose Inuit heritage has been recognized by the Nunatsiavut Government or to nomadic families who had spent some of the time in the Inuit Settlement Area but who ultimately settled in the south.) The majority of members were descended from Inuit who had historically lived in the coastal areas of southeast Labrador. Most early European settlers were single men, so they usually married Inuit or mixed Inuit-European women.

By 1985, the Labrador Métis Association (LMA) was formalized, and it submitted its first land claim in 1991. This was rejected. In 1996, a report by the Royal Commission on Aboriginal Peoples stated that the Labrador Métis had all the features of a distinct Aboriginal group, and would be theoretically able to accept the rights and powers of nationhood. In 1998, the LMA became the Labrador Métis Nation (LMN), and was recognized by the Anglican Church of Canada.

In 2007, the Court of Appeal of Newfoundland and Labrador found that the Labrador Métis Nation had a "credible but [as yet] unproven claim" to Indigenous rights, which means the Crown has a duty to a low level of consultation with the group on Indigenous issues.

In 2010, following a membership renewal process that required all members to submit proof of Inuit ancestry, the LMN renamed itself to the NunatuKavut Community Council. The NCC says this change was made to better reflect its Inuit heritage and to avoid confusion with First Nation-European groups also called Métis.

In 2019, NCC president Todd Russell signed a memorandum of understanding with then Crown-Indigenous Relations Minister, Carolyn Bennett. The memorandum of understanding was a non-binding document that said, "Canada has recognized NCC as an Indigenous collective". This triggered a legal challenge by other Indigenous groups, which was dismissed on the basis that the memorandum of understanding was the start of a process towards potential federal recognition, and did not grant Indigenous rights in itself.

The NCC is an associate member of the Congress of Aboriginal Peoples along with other non-Status Aboriginal groups. It has engaged with a number of projects which affect the NunatuKavummiut, although this is limited by their lack of federal recognition.

The elected NunatuKavut council comprises sixteen councillors and four executive members (including the president).

== Land claim ==
NunatuKavummiut claim NunatuKavut as their homeland, and are in the process of launching an Aboriginal land claim with the Canadian courts. These claims were first launched in 1991. The NCC has said it will work with other Inuit and Indigenous groups, such as the Nunatsiavut government and the Innu Nation, to negotiate shared land use or resolve overlapping land claims where necessary.

The NCC is also active in the debates over the Lower Churchill hydroelectric project, and the dam at Muskrat Falls.

== Notable NunatuKavummiut ==
- Lisa Dempster, politician
- Jennifer Hale, voice actress
- Yvonne Jones (born 1968), politician
- Todd Russell (born 1966), politician, president of NunatuKavut

== See also ==
- Nunavik
- Nunavut
- Labrador Inuit Pidgin French
