= Newfoundland and Labrador Route 513 =

Highway in Newfoundland and Labrador, Canada

Route 513
- St. Lewis Highway
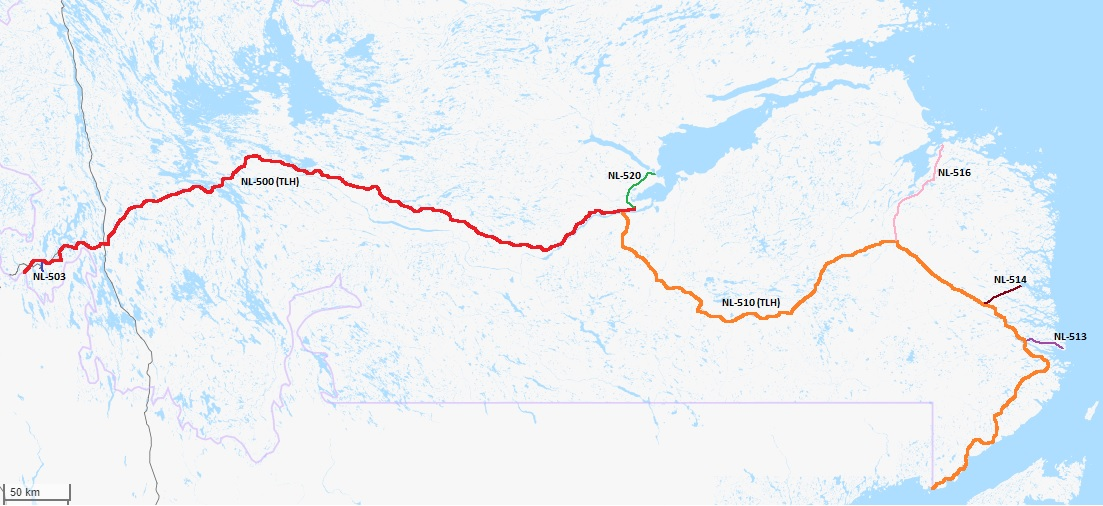
- Route 513 highlighted in purple

Route information
- Maintained by Newfoundland and Labrador Department of Transportation and Infrastructure
- Length: 32.9 km (20.4 mi)

Major junctions
- West end: Route 510 (Trans-Labrador Highway) near Mary's Harbour
- East end: St. Lewis

Location
- Country: Canada
- Province: Newfoundland and Labrador

Highway system
- Highways in Newfoundland and Labrador
← Route 510	→ Route 514

Route 513, also known as St. Lewis Highway, is a 32.9-kilometre-long (20.4 mi) east–west highway in southeastern Labrador in the Canadian province of Newfoundland and Labrador. It connects the town of St. Lewis with the Trans-Labrador Highway (Route 510). Route 513 passes through remote wooded terrain for its entire length, with no other major intersections or communities along the entire highway. The road is unpaved. Cell phone reception along Route 513 is severely limited.

== Route description ==
Route 513 begins at an intersection with Trans-Labrador Highway (Route 510) along the banks of the Alexis River, just north of that highway's crossing over the river. It heads eastward as an unpaved gravel road through remote wooded terrain for several kilometres to enter the town limits and immediately passes by the former Fox Harbour Air Station. The highway now winds its way through downtown, where it meets a local road leading to St. Lewis (Fox Harbour) Airport (which provides access a trail leading to the now abandoned community of Deepwater Creek). Route 513 curves to the south to pass through neighbourhoods before coming to a dead end along the coastline. At the end of the road, there is a sign stating that this is the easternmost point on the North American mainland that can be driven to.

== Major intersections ==
Location	km	mi	Destinations	Notes
	0.0	0.0	Route 510 (Trans-Labrador Highway) – Charlottetown, Port Hope Simpson, Mary's Harbour, Lodge Bay	Western terminus
St. Lewis	29.9	18.6	Fox Harbour Air Station access road	
St. Lewis	31.4	19.5	Airport Hill Road - St. Lewis (Fox Harbour) Airport (not a scheduled destination)	Access road into airport; provides access to trail leading to Deepwater Creek
St. Lewis	32.9	20.4	Dead End	Eastern terminus; easternmost point in mainland North America that can be driven to.
1.000 mi = 1.609 km; 1.000 km = 0.621 mi
