= Newfoundland and Labrador Route 514 =

Highway in Newfoundland and Labrador, Canada

Route 514
- Charlottetown Highway
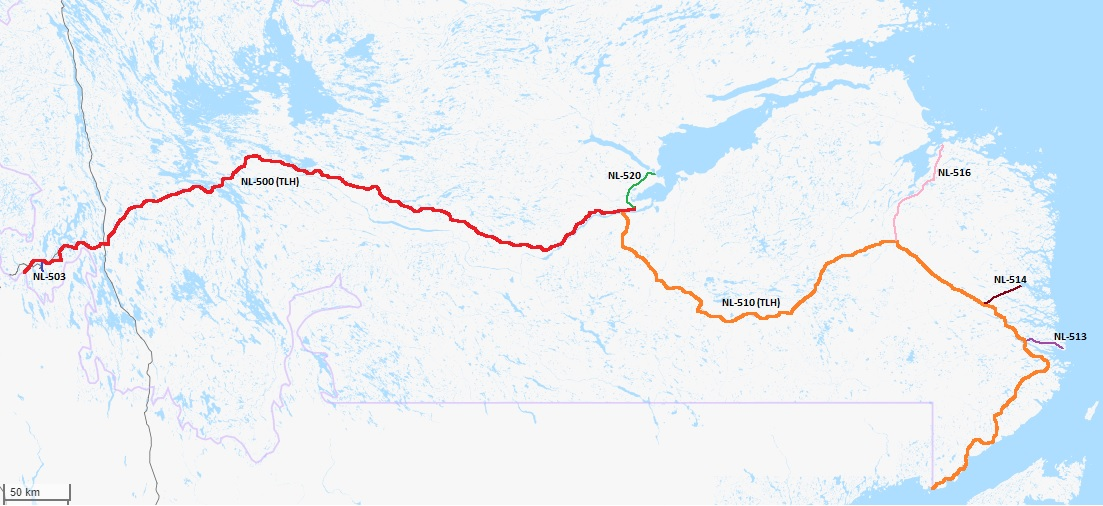
- Route 514 highlighted in Maroon

Route information
- Maintained by Newfoundland and Labrador Department of Transportation and Infrastructure
- Length: 29.5 km (18.3 mi)

Major junctions
- South end: Route 510 (Trans-Labrador Highway) at Charlottetown Junction
- Pinsent's Arm Road (Route 511-10) in Charlottetown
- North end: Main Street in Charlottetown

Location
- Country: Canada
- Province: Newfoundland and Labrador

Highway system
- Highways in Newfoundland and Labrador
← Route 513	→ Route 516

Route 514, also known as Charlottetown Highway, is a 29.5-kilometre-long (18.3 mi) north-south Highway in southeastern Labrador in the Canadian province of Newfoundland and Labrador. It connects the towns of Charlottetown and Pinsent's Arm with the Trans-Labrador Highway (Route 510). The road is unpaved. Cell phone reception along Route 514 is severely limited.

== Route description ==
Route 514 begins at an intersection with Route 510 at Charlottetown Junction and its way northeast through remote hilly terrain for several kilometres, where it crosses a river and passes by several lakes. The highway now enters the Charlottetown town limits and now has intersection with a local road, Pinsent's Arm Road (Route 511-10), which provides access to the town of Pinsent's Arm. Route 514 now passes by the Charlottetown Airport before passing through neighbourhoods and coming to an end at a T-Intersection in downtown.

== Major intersections ==
Location	km	mi	Destinations	Notes
Charlottetown Junction	0.0	0.0	Route 510 (Trans-Labrador Highway) – Happy Valley-Goose Bay, Cartwright, Port Hope Simpson, St. Lewis	Southern terminus
Charlottetown	27.9	17.3	Pinsent's Arm Road (Route 511-10) - Pinsent's Arm	
Charlottetown	29.0	18.0	Charlottetown Airport (not a scheduled destination)	Access road into airport
Charlottetown	29.5	18.3	Main Street - Norman's Bay Ferry (currently helicopter service)	Northern terminus
1.000 mi = 1.609 km; 1.000 km = 0.621 mi
