= Division No. 10, Newfoundland and Labrador =

Census division in Canada

Division No. 10
- Census division
- Location of Division No. 10 in Newfoundland and Labrador
- Coordinates: 52°57′N 66°55′W
- Country: Canada
- Province: Newfoundland and Labrador

Area
  - Total: 191,691.09 km^{2} (74,012.34 sq mi)
- As of 2021

Population (2021)
  - Total: 24,332
  - Density: 0.12693/km^{2} (0.32876/sq mi)

Census Division No. 10 of Newfoundland and Labrador is composed of the Labrador region of the province, excluding Nunatsiavut. It has a land area of 199,703 km² (77,105.8 sq mi) and at the 2016 census had a population of 24,639, up from 24,111 in 2011. Its two major population centres are the towns of Happy Valley-Goose Bay and Labrador City.

== Demographics ==
In the 2021 Census of Population conducted by Statistics Canada, Division No. 10 had a population of 24,332 living in 9,518 of its 10,941 total private dwellings, a change of −1.2% from its 2016 population of 24,639. With a land area of 191,691.09 km^{2} (74,012.34 sq mi), it had a population density of 0.1/km^{2} (0.3/sq mi) in 2021.

Top Ten Ethnic Origins for the Population in Division No. 10, Newfoundland and Labrador (Canada 2016 Census)
Ethnic Origin	Percentage of Population
Canadian	41.8%
English	30.4%
First Nations (North American Indian)	15.8%
Inuit	14.8%
Métis	13.6%
Irish	12.5%
Scottish	7.1%
French	6.4%
German	1.8%
British Isles origins, not included elsewhere	0.9%
Newfoundlander	0.8%

== Towns ==
- Cartwright
- Charlottetown
- Forteau
- Happy Valley-Goose Bay
- Labrador City
- L'Anse-au-Clair
- L'Anse-au-Loup
- Mary's Harbour
- North West River
- Pinware
- Port Hope Simpson
- Red Bay
- St. Lewis
- Wabush
- West St. Modeste

== Unorganized subdivisions ==
- Subdivision A (Includes: L'Anse-Amour, Capstan Island)
- Subdivision B (Includes: Lodge Bay, Paradise River, Black Tickle, Norman's Bay, Pinsent's Arm, William's Harbour)
- Subdivision C (Includes: Sheshatshiu, Mud Lake)
- Subdivision D (Includes: Churchill Falls)
- Subdivision E (Includes: Natuashish)

== Sources ==
- "Division No. 10, Newfoundland and Labrador (Code 1010) Census Profile". 2011 census. Government of Canada - Statistics Canada.
