= Newfoundland and Labrador Route 516 =

Road in Canada

Route 516
- Cartwright Highway
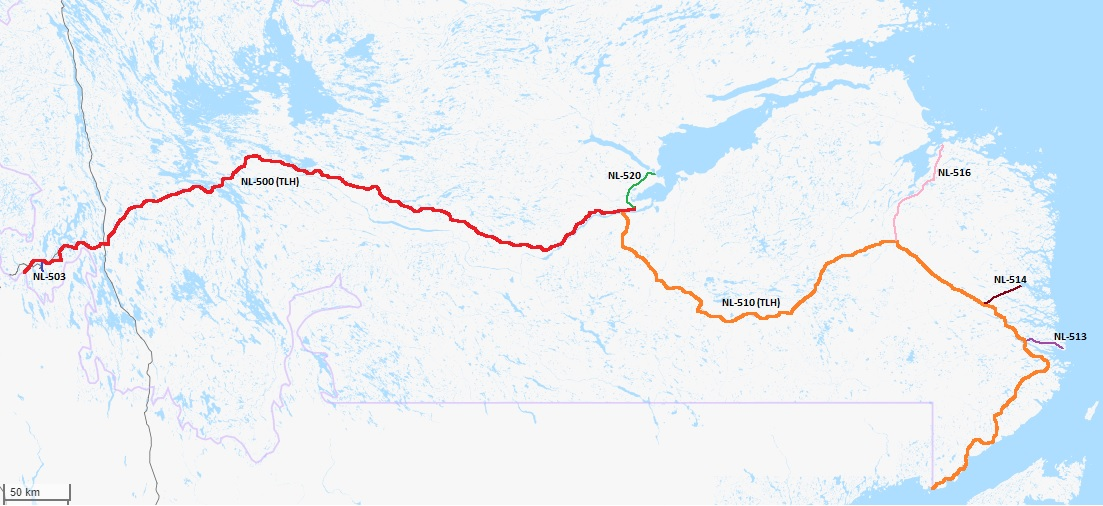
- Route 516 highlighted in pink

Route information
- Maintained by Newfoundland and Labrador Department of Transportation and Infrastructure
- Length: 94 km (58 mi)

Major junctions
- South end: Route 510 (Trans-Labrador Highway) at Cartwright Junction
- North end: Cartwright

Location
- Country: Canada
- Province: Newfoundland and Labrador

Highway system
- Highways in Newfoundland and Labrador
← Route 514	→ Route 520

Route 516, also known as Cartwright Highway, is a 94-kilometre-long (58 mi) north–south highway in southeastern Labrador in the Canadian province of Newfoundland and Labrador. It connects the town of Cartwright, along with the community of Paradise River, with the Trans-Labrador Highway (Route 510) at Cartwright Junction. The highway passes through remote, wooded, and hilly terrain for its entire length. The road is unpaved. Cell phone reception along Route 516 is severely limited.

== Route description ==
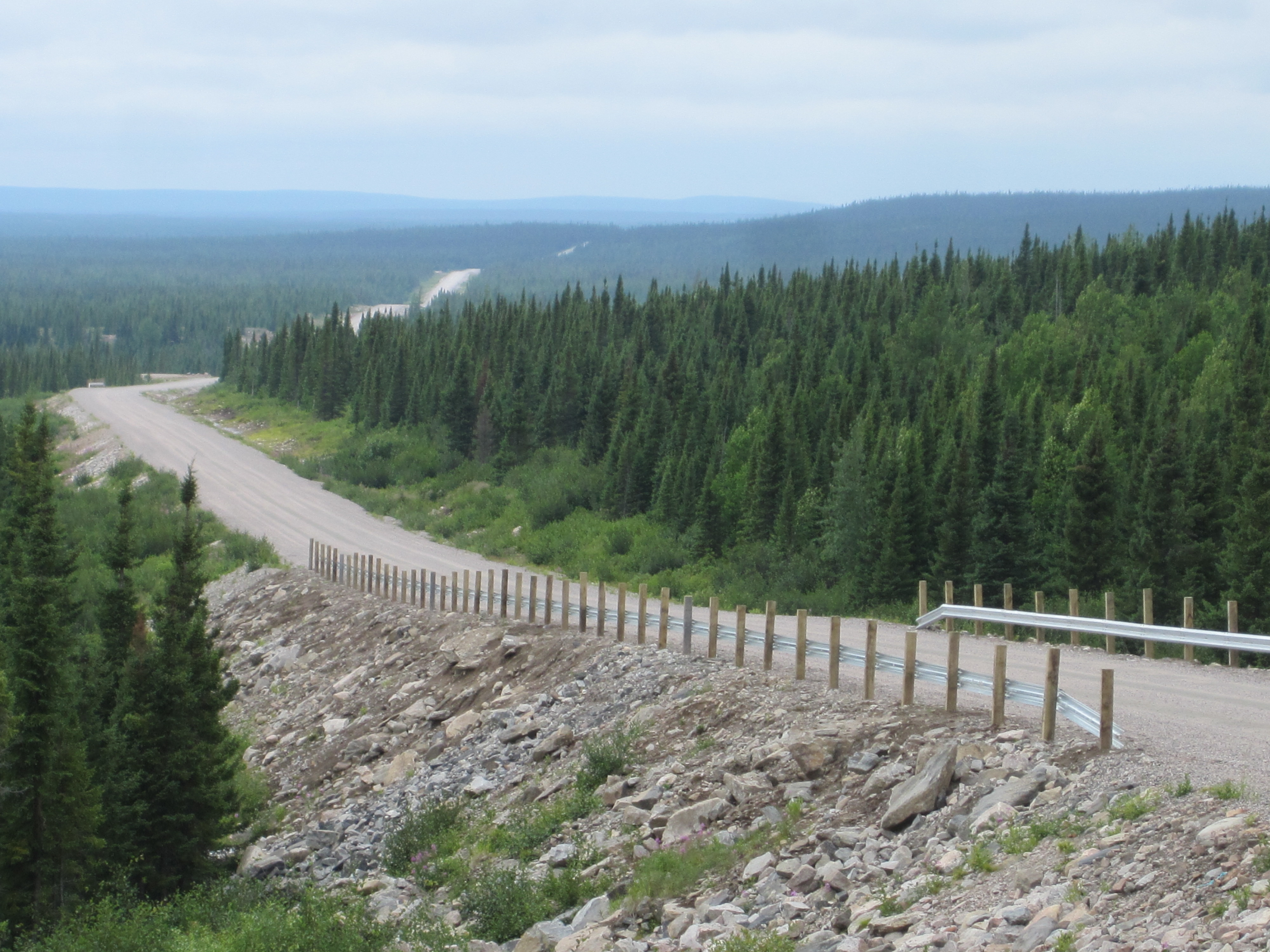
View along Route 516

Route 516 begins at an intersection with Trans-Labrador Highway (Route 510) at Cartwright Junction and heads northward through remote, hilly, and wooded terrain for the next several kilometres. It crosses the Paradise River before meeting a local road leading to the community of the same name. This aforementioned intersection is located at the site of the former Paradise River Airport. The highway then parallels the eastern shore of Sandwich Bay for several kilometres, where it passes by Cartwright Airport (not a scheduled destination), before entering the Cartwright town limits. Route 516 comes to an end at an intersection between Point Road and Main Road in downtown Cartwright near the harbour.

== History ==
Phase II of the Trans-Labrador Highway involved completion of highway north to Cartwright from Red Bay, and was opened in 2002. Although the entire route was initially designated as Route 510, upon completion of Phase III, the northern 94 km (58 mi) from Cartwright Junction was designated as Route 516.

== Major intersections ==
Location	km	mi	Destinations	Notes
Cartwright Junction	0.0	0.0	Route 510 (Trans-Labrador Highway) – Happy Valley-Goose Bay, Charlottetown, Port Hope Simpson	Southern terminus
	50.8	31.6	Paradise River Road - Paradise River	
	87.6	54.4	Cartwright Airport (not a scheduled destination)	Access road into airport
Cartwright	94	58	Point Road / Main Road	Northern terminus
1.000 mi = 1.609 km; 1.000 km = 0.621 mi
