= Newfoundland and Labrador Route 520 =

Highway in Newfoundland and Labrador

Route 520
- North West River Road
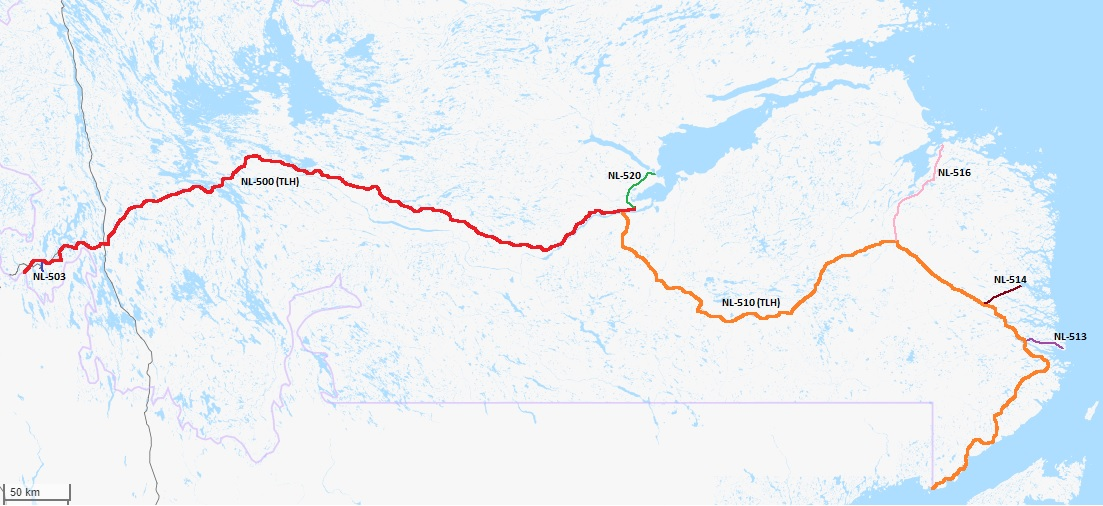
- Route 520 highlighted in green

Route information
- Maintained by Newfoundland and Labrador Department of Transportation and Infrastructure
- Length: 45.0 km (28.0 mi)

Major junctions
- South end: Route 500 (Trans-Labrador Highway) in Happy Valley-Goose Bay
- North end: Portage Road in North West River

Location
- Country: Canada
- Province: Newfoundland and Labrador

Highway system
- Highways in Newfoundland and Labrador
← Route 516	→ Route 1 (TCH)

Route 520, also known as North West River Road, is a 45-kilometre-long (28 mi) north-south supplementary highway off of the Trans-Labrador Highway in Labrador, which connects Happy Valley-Goose Bay to North West River.

Route 520 is the highest numbered highway of any kind in the entire province of Newfoundland and Labrador.

== Route description ==
Route 520 begins at an intersection with Route 500 (Trans Labrador Highway) at the western edge of Happy Valley, with the road continuing into downtown as Hamilton River Road. It heads northwest through the Goose Bay portion of town to pass by Canadian Forces Base Goose Bay (and Goose Bay Airport), Nunatsiavut Marine Ferry terminal, and Goose (Otter Creek) Water Aerodrome, before crossing the Goose River to leave Happy Valley-Goose Bay and wind its way north along the outer reaches of Lake Melville. The highway passes northeast through rural wooded areas for several kilometres before passing through Sheshatshiu and crossing over the Naskaupi River into North West River, with Route 520 officially ending shortly thereafter at an intersection with Portage Road.

== Major intersections ==
Location	km	mi	Destinations	Notes
Happy Valley-Goose Bay	0.0	0.0	Route 500 (Trans-Labrador Highway/Hamilton River Road) – Downtown, Churchill Falls, Cartwright, Labrador City	Southern terminus
Happy Valley-Goose Bay	2.1	1.3	Loring Drive - CFB Goose Bay; Goose Bay Airport	
Happy Valley-Goose Bay	6.5	4.0	Terrington Basin Lane - Nunatsiavut Marine Ferry	Access road to ferry terminal; communities serviced included Rigolet, Makkovik, Postville, Hopedale, Natuashish, and Nain (seasonal service)
Happy Valley-Goose Bay	8.0	5.0	Goose (Otter Creek) Water Aerodrome	Access road into airport
Happy Valley-Goose Bay	14.1	8.8	Welbourne Bay Road - Welbourne Bay	
Sheshatshiu	39.0	24.2	MacKenzie Drive - Sheshatshiu Indian Reserve	Sheshatshiu Innu First Nation
North West River	45.0	28.0	Portage Road - Downtown	Northern terminus
1.000 mi = 1.609 km; 1.000 km = 0.621 mi

== Attractions along Route 520 ==
- Lake Melville
- Canadian Forces Base Goose Bay
- Goose Bay Airport
- Nunatsiavut Marine Ferry
- Goose (Otter Creek) Water Aerodrome

== See also ==
- Trans-Labrador Highway
- List of highways numbered 520
