= North River, Labrador, Newfoundland and Labrador =

North River
- Location of North River in Newfoundland and Labrador
- Coordinates: 53.817°N 57.101°W
- Country: Canada
- Province: Newfoundland and Labrador
- Census division: 10
- Time zone: UTC-3:30 (Newfoundland Time)
  - Summer (DST): UTC-2:30 (Newfoundland Daylight)
- Area code: 709

North River is a settlement in the Canadian province of Newfoundland and Labrador. It is located on the northern bank of the North River, about 10 miles north of the town of Cartwright, at the river's outlet into Sandwich Bay.

== See also ==
- List of cities and towns in Newfoundland and Labrador
