= Cape Charles =

Cape Charles may refer to:

- Cape Charles, Virginia, a town in Northampton County, Virginia
- Cape Charles (headland), headland or cape in Northampton County, Virginia

== See also ==
- Cape St. Charles
