= Capstan Island =

Designated place in Newfoundland and Labrador, Canada

Coordinates: 51.570°N 56.732°W

Location of Capstan Island in Newfoundland and Labrador

Capstan Island is a designated place in the Canadian province of Newfoundland and Labrador.

Located along the Labrador Straits or Strait of Belle Isle, which is a major shipping/export route to oversea destinations, Capstan Island is a small community of 55 residents. It is primarily known for its rich fishing grounds.

Residents lived off the land and sea for primary food/income. Cod fish, crab, scallop, escargot, lumpfish roe, herring and squid, Black duck, murre, pigeons, rabbits, spruced grouse, ptarmigan, caribou, moose, porcupine, beaver, bear were species hunted & fished by most families. Also the fur industry added additional income.

Capstan Island got its name from a capstan located on an island very near to the village. A capstan is a sturdy wooden post and handle, mounted in a stabilizing frame, used to wind in a rope or cable to block seals in the bay. Around 1851 residents began sealing in this area. A large capstan was placed on the small island just offshore and a seal net attached to it. When harp seals migrated along the shore in spring, the net 'box' trapped them. Capstan Island is located in the Labrador Straits region on Route 510 (Trans-Labrador Highway), only 39 km from the Quebec/Labrador border.

There are often icebergs directly across from the community; visitors can go to the fishing wharf and get a view.

== Geography ==
Capstan Island is in Labrador within Subdivision A of Division No. 10.

== Demographics ==
As a designated place in the 2021 Census of Population conducted by Statistics Canada, Capstan Island recorded a population of 55 living in 30 of its 31 total private dwellings, a change of 34.1% from its 2016 population of 41. With a land area of 9.09 km^{2} (3.51 sq mi), it had a population density of 6.1/km^{2} (15.7/sq mi) in 2021.

== See also ==
- List of communities in Newfoundland and Labrador
- List of designated places in Newfoundland and Labrador
