= Lodge Bay =

Lodge Bay Ranger Lodge
- Local service district / designated place
- Interactive map of Lodge Bay
- Coordinates: 52°13′00″N 55°37′59″W
- Country: Canada
- Province: Newfoundland and Labrador

Government
  - Type: Town Council
  - MHA: Lisa Dempster
  - MP: Philip Earle

Area
  - Total: 14.68 km^{2} (5.67 sq mi)

Population (2021)
  - Total: 61
- Time zone: UTC-3:30 (Newfoundland Time)
  - Summer (DST): UTC-2:30 (Newfoundland Daylight)
- Postal Code: A0K 1T0
- Area code: 709
- Highways: Route 510 (Trans-Labrador Highway)

Lodge Bay is a local service district and designated place in the Canadian province of Newfoundland and Labrador. It is on the southeast coast of Labrador. Encompassing a population of less than one hundred residents, the community has uniquely evolved from both early European colonization of Labrador, and the inimitable patterns of land and resource use by the migratory Inuit population. The name Lodge Bay originated from the title Ranger Lodge, which was the name given to the area by trader and explorer, Captain George Cartwright in the late 18th century. "Ranger" was the name of the wooden-mercantile ship Cartwright used to trade, map and explore the Labrador coast, while "Lodge" was the name given to English hunting camps in Great Britain at that time.

== History ==
Labrador Inuit have had a long established relationship with the region enveloping Lodge Bay. Its environmental location provided an abundance of natural resources including fur, salmon, timber, and fresh water. The seasonal transhumance lifestyle of the Inuit culture caused them to nomadically pursue these resources as a means of survival. Cartwright's journal published in 1792 makes numerous references to the Inuit's instinctive use of the Labrador terrain, and a seasonal pursuance of trade at Ranger Lodge.

The Labrador Treaty of 1765, conducted by Governor of Newfoundland Sir Hugh Palliser, would bring the Inuit of Labrador into a peaceful friendship with the British government and eventual settlers. Until this time, the invasion of Inuit territory by French, British, and American merchants, often left Inuit hostile to both early settlers and merchant trading crews. However, not all Innu and Inuit were contentious with the presence of Europeans. The trading firms established throughout Labrador would eventually benefit the native inhabitants, providing them with industrious goods such as steel tools, clothing, and firearms. The treaty was signed in August 1765 at Chateau Bay, Labrador, representing the interests of both Sir Hugh Palliser and the Southern Labrador Inuit. Although this peace treaty would lead to a steady increase of trade and settlement on the coast, the Inuit of Labrador would eventually be pressured from their southern homes to areas north of Cape St. Charles, and thus vacating the resourceful territory of Lodge Bay.

Captain George Cartwright would establish his first partnered trading post in Labrador at Cape St. Charles in the year 1770. That same year, this brave English explorer would establish his own private merchant venture at Lodge Bay. Cartwright actively explored, traded, and established strong relationships with the resident Innu and Inuit of Labrador. Cartwright's close relationship with the Aboriginal people, and their discerning knowledge of the land, caused Cartwright to extend his business to claim posts at Ranger Lodge, presently Lodge Bay (1770–74), Caribou Castle, today's community of Cartwright (1775–78), and Stage Cove (1774–75). The relentlessly competitive salmon and fur trade eventually left Captain George Cartwright bankrupt in 1784. His remaining trading firms and supplies were eventually sold at market to rival merchants, although, his first inspiring post at Ranger Lodge had been destroyed by fire in 1772.

With the acceleration of European colonization in the 19th and early 20th century, Lodge Bay was primarily used as a wintering station for the seasonal and year-round fishing crews who frequented the Labrador Coast. Most of these early settlers were driven by the industrious fish trade, particularly cod, mackerel, herring and salmon, however, the Canadian fur trade also attracted many brave pioneers to this remote area.

Lodge Bay was the accepted site of seasonal settlement for many of the same reasons the Labrador Inuit had practiced use of the area, the unrestricted abundance of resources. This transient lifestyle caused early settlers to reside at often two locations throughout the year. During summer until late autumn, families often lived at the distant outlying communities of Cape St. Charles, Henley Harbour or Battle Harbour. These summer stations were built strategically exposed to the Atlantic Ocean where fishermen could maximize profits of the lucrative fish trade. While conjointly, interior communities such as Lodge Bay and nearby Mary's Harbour were established for a life during the occasionally treacherous winter and early spring seasons. Winter settlements were immensely focused on trapping, wood harvesting, boat repair and seal hunting.

The community of Lodge Bay would become a permanently lived-in community at the beginning of the 20th century. A steady decline of both the cod and salmon fisheries in the early 20th century, with a moratorium to the cod fishery in 1992, would lead to the mass resettlement of many seasonal fishing communities. The families of nearby Cape St. Charles, Carrol's Cove, Henley Harbour and others were forced to resettle and seek employment elsewhere. Residents of Cape St. Charles who solely used Lodge Bay as a winter settlement, would forcefully return to their winter homes to reside permanently.

== Geography ==
Lodge Bay is in Labrador within Subdivision B of Division No. 10. The community lies within a densely forested region located at the head of the St. Charles River. Nourishing a boreal ecosystem, extensive forests of black spruce, white spruce and balsam fir cover much of the landscape. This ecosystem provides a healthy habitat for the populations of moose, wolves, bear, ptarmigan, rabbit and lynx that inhabit the area. The St. Charles River strategically opens into the mouth of Cape St. Charles and the Great Caribou Islands. Large populations of Atlantic salmon annually migrate the St. Charles River to reach native breeding grounds. The surrounding bay is also home to a variety of fish species including trout, freshwater smelts and shellfish.

== Demographics ==
As a designated place in the 2016 Census of Population conducted by Statistics Canada, Lodge Bay recorded a population of 65 living in 27 of its 37 total private dwellings, a change of −16.7% from its 2011 population of 78. With a land area of 6.19 km^{2} (2.39 sq mi), it had a population density of 10.5/km^{2} (27.2/sq mi) in 2016.

== Arts and culture ==
Many immigrant settlers chose to make Lodge Bay their seasonal home, however none more prominent than the historical "Pye" family. The Pye family surname is an ancient extraction of purely British origin. The name was notorious in the late 15th century, solely concentrated in the Herefordshire County of southern England. Over time, many families bearing the Pye surname immigrated to the colony of Newfoundland, more particularly the Conception Bay and surrounding area. From there, families who followed the fur and fish trades often chose to relocate to the abundant shores of Labrador, especially the active fishing settlement Cape St. Charles.

Like many families of Labrador, the Pye family can trace their ancestral lineage to the first Labrador immigrant colonists. Through a combination of cultural integrity, oral history and parish Church records, the Labrador-Pye descendants can view their past, which starts at the beginning of the colony.

Lodge Bay is also residence to many members of the NunatuKavummiut, formally known as the Labrador Metis Nation. The NunatuKavummiut, currently the largest aboriginal group in Labrador, are the inherent descendants of both the immigrating Europeans of the 18th and 19th century, and the resident Labrador Inuit population. European men often intermarried Labrador Inuit women, combining to create a distinct culture, ancestry and heritage based on the beliefs and practices of both parent cultures. Lodge Bay is accepted as the southernmost permanent community within the Nunatukavut lands claims, although, the area surrounding Lodge Bay is also extensively considered.

== Government ==
Lodge Bay is a local service district (LSD) that is governed by a committee responsible for the provision of certain services to the community. The chair of the LSD committee is Colin Rumbolt.

== See also ==
- List of communities in Newfoundland and Labrador
- List of designated places in Newfoundland and Labrador
- List of local service districts in Newfoundland and Labrador
