= Paradise River, Newfoundland and Labrador =

Settlement in Newfoundland and Labrador, Canada

Coordinates: 53.434°N 57.266°W

Paradise River is a community on the southwestern coastline of Sandwich Bay in southeastern Labrador, Canada.

Located at the outlet of the river for which the community is named, it is situated along Route 516, the Cartwright Highway, which connects Paradise River to the town of Cartwright as well as the Trans-Labrador Highway (Route 510), which in turn is connected to Happy Valley-Goose Bay among many communities along Labrador's southern coast.

The Paradise River provided an important route between the coast and the Labrador interior for native peoples prior to European settlement. The community of Paradise River was established in 1775 by George Cartwright. The people of Paradise River were involved in the cod and salmon fishery in the summer months and fur trapping and hunting in the winter.

Employment in the community today comes through the operation of small local sawmills or as guides to fishing and hunting camps on the Eagle River. All public services are provided in neighboring Cartwright. Paradise River had a reported population of 10 in 2016 and 5 in 2021.

Paradise River also used to have an airport, Paradise River Airport, though it has since closed. The community is located within the Atlantic Time Zone and observes Daylight Saving Time.
