= Pensons Arm =

- Local service district / designated place
- Location of Pensons Arm Pensons Arm (Canada)
- Coordinates: 52.686°N 55.892°W
- Country: Canada
- Province: Newfoundland and Labrador
- Region: Labrador
- Census division: 10
- Census subdivision: B

Government
  - Type: Unincorporated

Area
  - Land: 3.23 km^{2} (1.25 sq mi)

Population (2021)
  - Total: 43
- Time zone: UTC−04:00 (AST)
  - Summer (DST): UTC−03:00 (ADT)
- Area code: 709
- Highways: Route 514

Pensons Arm (also known as Pinsent's Arm) is a local service district and designated place in the Canadian province of Newfoundland and Labrador. A coastal village located 20 km southeast of Charlottetown, it has a population of 43 according to the 2021 census.

== Geography ==
Pensons Arm is in Labrador within Subdivision B of Division No. 10. Topographically it is surrounded by St. Michaels Bay, an inlet of the Labrador Sea to the north and Scrammy Bay to the east.

== Demographics ==
As a designated place in the 2016 Census of Population conducted by Statistics Canada, Pensons Arm recorded a population of 61 living in 20 of its 21 total private dwellings, a change of 15.1% from its 2011 population of 53. With a land area of 3.23 km^{2} (1.25 sq mi), it had a population density of 18.9/km^{2} (48.9/sq mi) in 2016.

== Government ==
Pensons Arm is a local service district (LSD) that is governed by a committee responsible for the provision of certain services to the community. The chair of the LSD committee is Harrison Campbell.

== See also ==
- Charlottetown, Newfoundland and Labrador
- List of designated places in Newfoundland and Labrador
- List of local service districts in Newfoundland and Labrador
