= Newfoundland and Labrador Route 503 =

Highway in Newfoundland and Labrador

Route 503
- Grenfell Drive
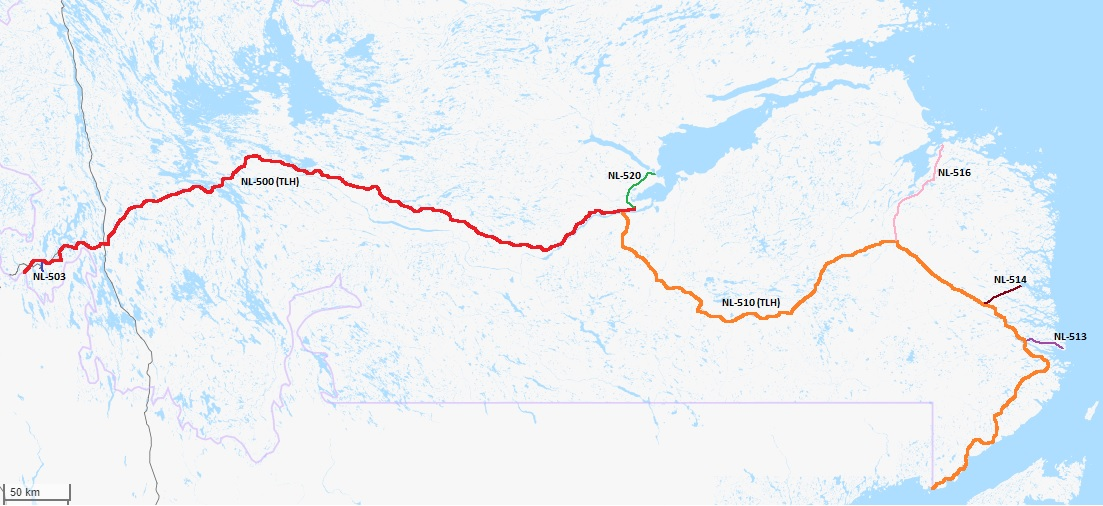
- Route 503 highlighted in blue

Route information
- Maintained by Newfoundland and Labrador Department of Transportation and Infrastructure
- Length: 5.2 km (3.2 mi)

Major junctions
- South end: Snow’s Drive / Bowater Drive in Wabush
- North end: Route 500 (TLH) in Wabush

Location
- Country: Canada
- Province: Newfoundland and Labrador

Highway system
- Highways in Newfoundland and Labrador
← Route 500	→ Route 510

Route 503, also known as Grenfell Drive, is a 5.2-kilometre-long (3.2 mi) north–south highway in the Labrador West region of southwestern Labrador. It connects Wabush with the Trans-Labrador Highway and the town of Labrador City.

== Route description ==
Route 503 begins in Wabush's southern neighbourhoods at an intersection between Snow's Drive and Bowater Drive as a two-lane highway. It heads northwest through neighbourhoods before passing along the western side of downtown, where it temporarily widens to a four-lane divided highway. The highway now narrows back to two-lanes and passes north through wooded areas before passing by an industrial/business district and the Wabush Airport before Route 503 comes to an end at an intersection with Route 500 (Trans-Labrador Highway) near Labrador City.

== Major intersections ==
The entire route is in Wabush.

km	mi	Destinations	Notes
0.0	0.0	Snow's Drive / Bowater Drive	Southern terminus
4.3	2.7	Wabush Airport main entrance	Access road into airport
5.2	3.2	Route 500 (Trans-Labrador Highway) – Fermont, Labrador City, Churchill Falls, Happy Valley-Goose Bay	Northern terminus
1.000 mi = 1.609 km; 1.000 km = 0.621 mi
