= Sandwich Bay =

Sandwich Bay may refer to:

- Sandwich Bay, Kent, England
- Sandwich Bay (Newfoundland and Labrador), Canada
