= Blackguard Bay =

Coordinates: 53.736°N 56.672°W

Blackguard Bay is a natural bay on the coast of Labrador in the province of Newfoundland and Labrador, Canada. The closest inhabited place is Cartwright.
