= Trans-Labrador Highway =

Highway in Newfoundland and Labrador, Canada

Trans-Labrador Highway
- Route 500; Route 510
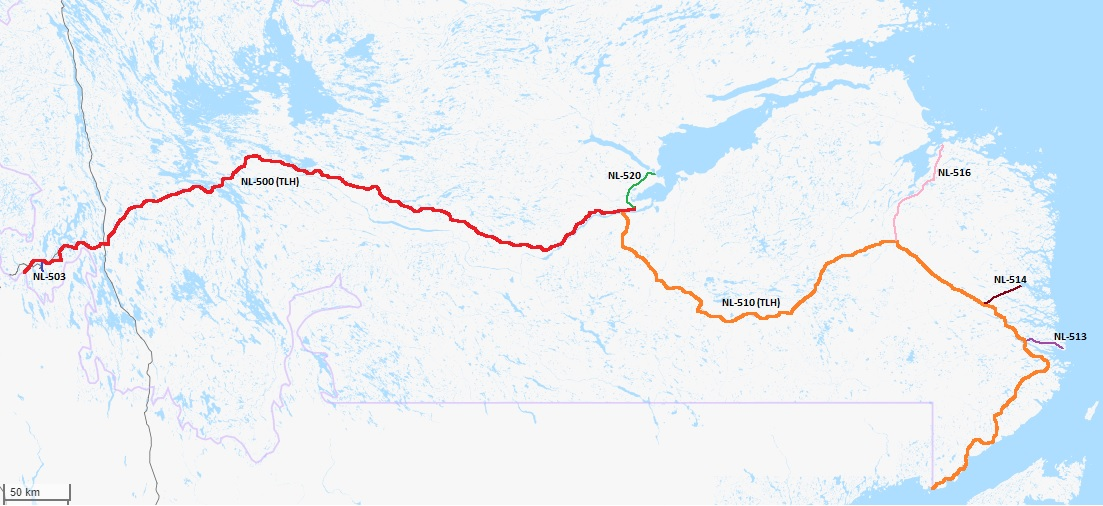
- Route 500 highlighted in red, Route 510 highlighted in orange

Route information
- Maintained by Newfoundland and Labrador Department of Transportation and Infrastructure
- Length: 1,149 km (714 mi)

Route 500
- Length: 543 km (337 mi)
- South end: R-389 at Quebec border near Labrador City
- Major intersections: Route 503 in Wabush; Route 510 near Happy Valley-Goose Bay
- North end: Route 520 in Happy Valley-Goose Bay

Route 510
- Length: 606 km (377 mi)
- South end: R-138 at Quebec border near Blanc-Sablon, QC
- Major intersections: Route 516 to Cartwright; Route 514 to Charlottetown; Route 513 to St. Lewis
- North end: Route 500 near Happy Valley-Goose Bay

Location
- Country: Canada
- Province: Newfoundland and Labrador

Highway system
- Highways in Newfoundland and Labrador
Route 490Route 500Route 503
Route 503Route 510Route 513

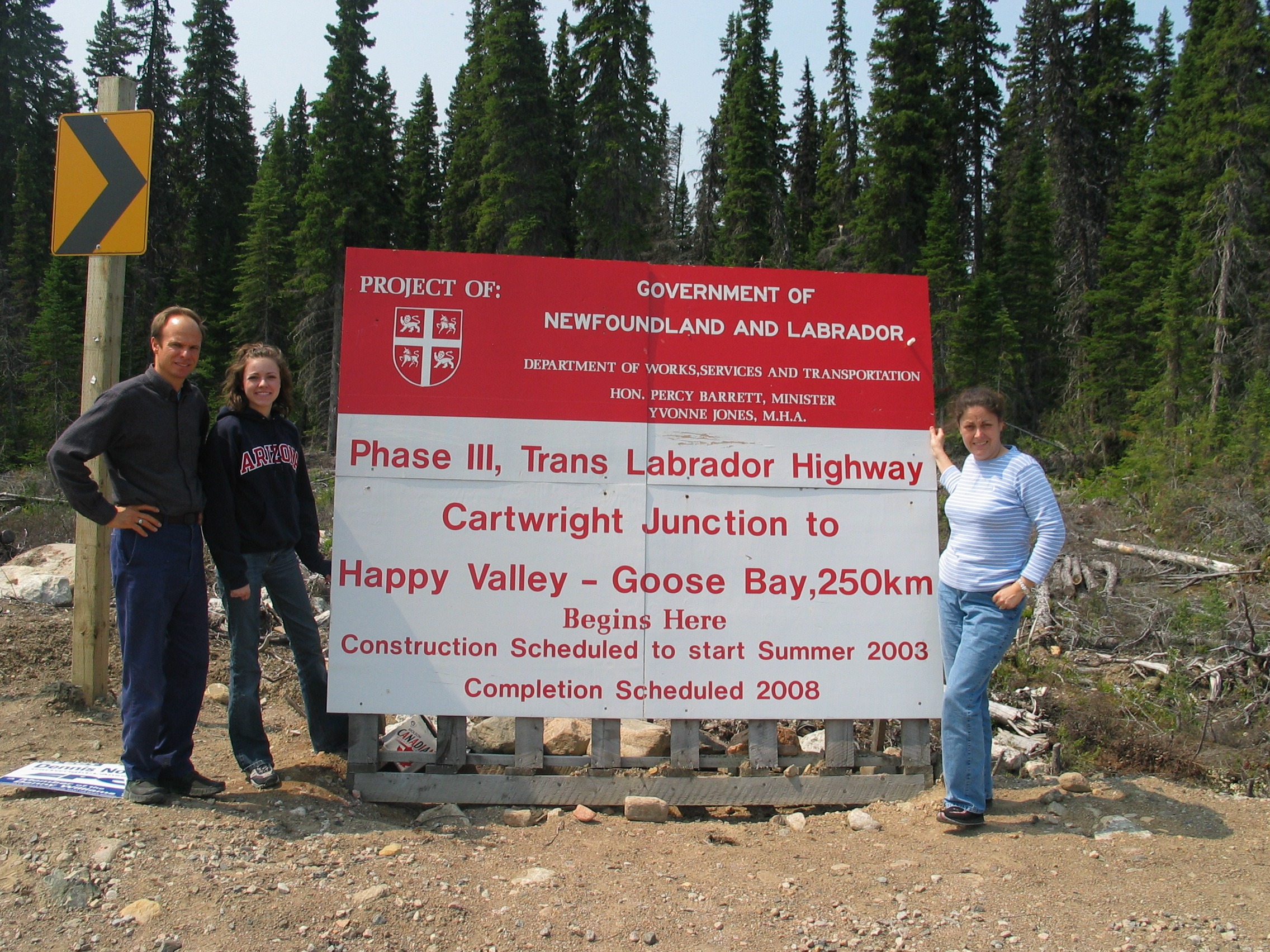
Start of Phase III of Trans-Labrador Highway, a 250 kilometres (160 mi) gravel road between Cartwright Junction and Happy Valley-Goose Bay, 2004

The Trans-Labrador Highway (TLH) is the primary public road in Labrador, the mainland portion of the province of Newfoundland and Labrador, Canada. The highway's total length is 1,149 km (714 mi). The paving of the entire highway was completed in July 2022.

The original western/central portion of the TLH is designated as Route 500 and measures 543 km (337 mi) divided as follows:

- Quebec - Labrador boundary to Labrador City/Wabush (18 km (11 mi), asphalt surface)
- Labrador City/Wabush to Churchill Falls (244 km (152 mi), asphalt surface)
- Churchill Falls to Happy Valley-Goose Bay (281 km (175 mi), asphalt surface)

Heading southeast is Route 510, the north portion of the TLH that has been designated Labrador Coastal Drive and measures 606 km (377 mi) divided as follows:

- Happy Valley-Goose Bay to Cartwright Junction (287 km (178 mi), asphalt surface)
- Cartwright Junction to Port Hope Simpson (103 km (64 mi), asphalt surface)
- Port Hope Simpson to Mary's Harbour (51 km (32 mi), asphalt surface)
- Mary's Harbour to Lodge Bay (12 km (7.5 mi), asphalt surface)
- Lodge Bay to Red Bay (78 km (48 mi), asphalt surface)
- Red Bay to Quebec - Labrador boundary via Blanc-Sablon (77 km (48 mi), asphalt surface)

The TLH runs through dense wilderness for most of its length with no roadside services between communities. Route 500 connects with Quebec Route 389, which runs 567 km (352 mi) through wilderness north from Baie-Comeau to the Quebec - Labrador boundary. Cell phone reception along the Trans-Labrador Highway is limited.

In the 2020 budget, the provincial government allocated $200,000 for a pre-feasibility study for a road to connect the north coast of Labrador to the Trans-Labrador Highway.

== Construction and development ==
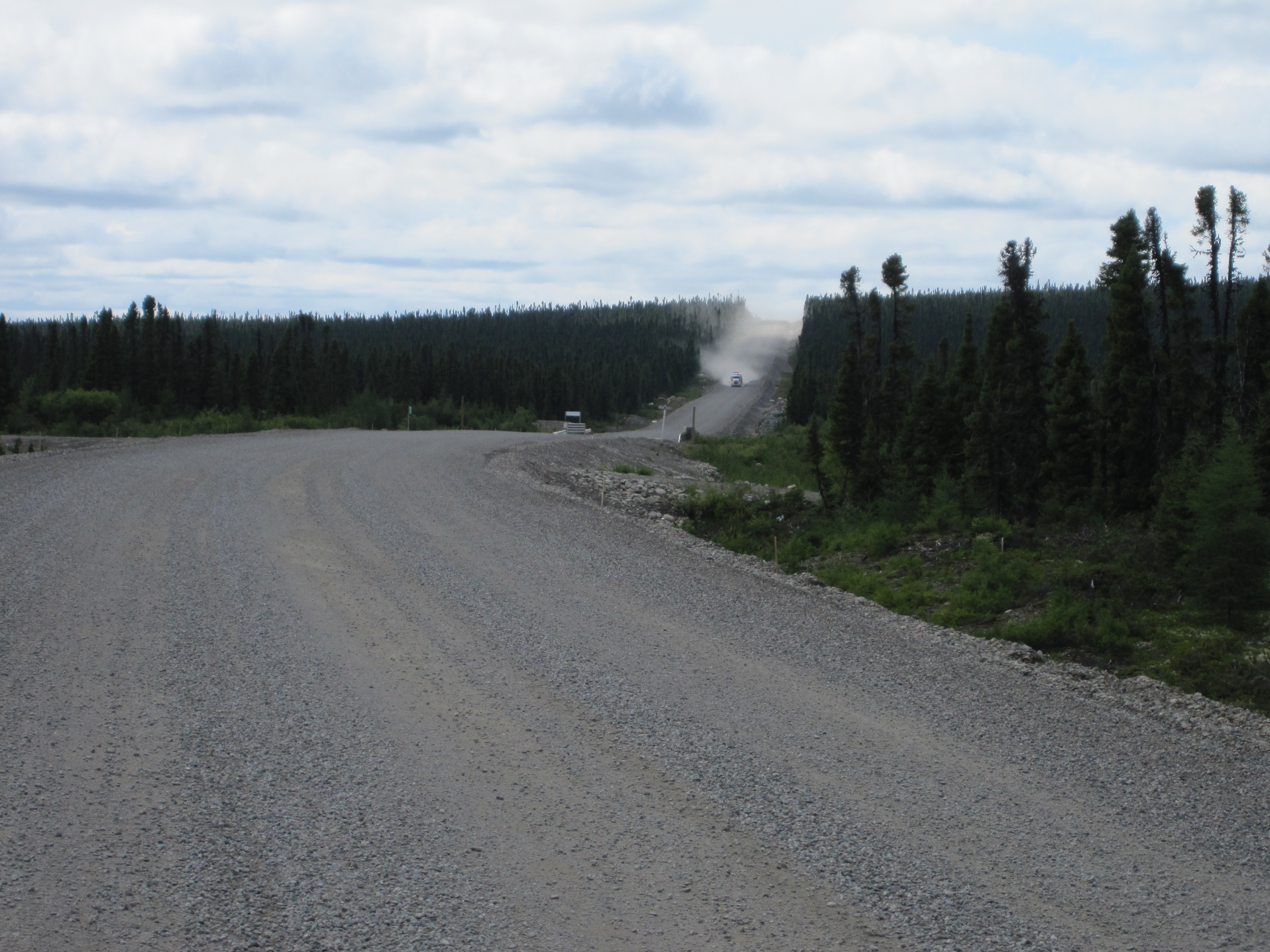
Trans-Labrador highway in Division No. 10, Subdivision D, NL in 2010

=== Phase I, upgrading Labrador West to Happy Valley-Goose Bay ===
The original TLH from Labrador West (Labrador City/Wabush) to Happy Valley-Goose Bay was completed in 1992. Some sections were poorly built or in need of upgrades due to increased traffic use, particularly the section between Churchill Falls and Happy Valley-Goose Bay. In the summer of 1999, $60 million was allocated to upgrade the highway as part of the "Labrador Transportation Initiative".

The Phase I section of the TLH began undergoing paving operations in 2009; by October 2011, a stretch of approximately 140 km (87 mi) leading east from Labrador West had been paved, as well approximately 100 km (62 mi) heading west from Goose Bay towards Churchill Falls. The entire Phase I section of the TLH was completed in 2015.

==== Route 510 ====
In 1997, the Government of Newfoundland and Labrador committed to building an extension of the TLH, connecting Happy Valley-Goose Bay with an existing isolated road network serving coastal communities on the Strait of Belle Isle. The impetus for this project was the federal government's desire to cut costs and remove itself from subsidizing coastal ferry service to Labrador outports which was being provided by the federal Crown corporation Marine Atlantic.

These federal cuts were completed in 1997, under the moniker Labrador Transportation Initiative, when an agreement was signed which saw the federal government transfer ownership and operation of two ferry vessels, along with C$340 million for extending Labrador's road network. A key component to this plan was $150 million to upgrade coastal Labrador marine services, including a newer high-capacity ferry for the St. Barbe-Blanc Sablon service across the Strait of Belle Isle.

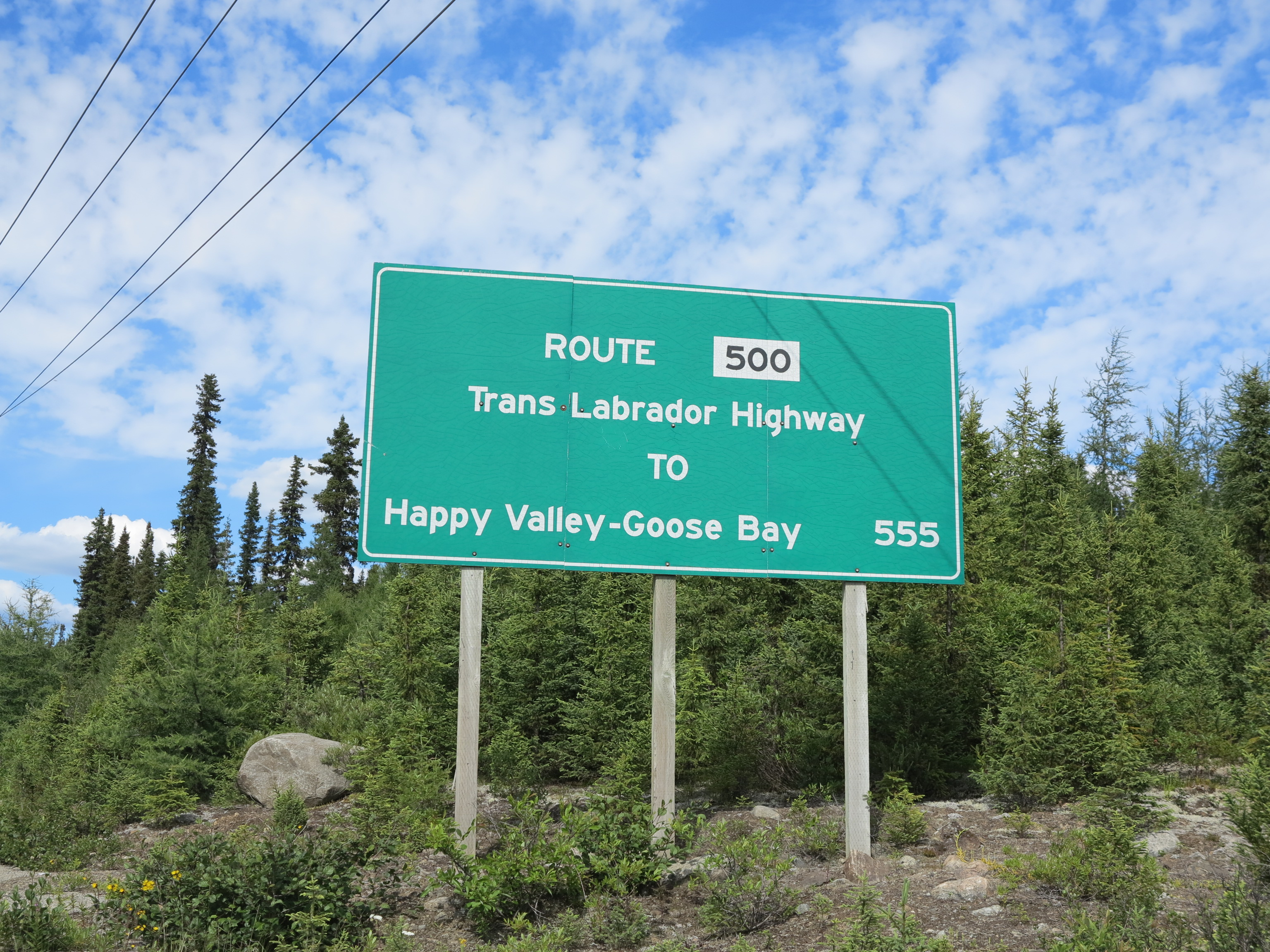
Route 500 heading towards Happy Valley-Goose Bay

=== Phase II, Red Bay to Cartwright Junction ===
Phase II of new construction, costing $130 million, began in 1999 and saw Route 510 extended 323 km (201 mi) over four years from its terminus in Red Bay northeast to the port of Cartwright. This section was paved as far as Cartwright Junction, the unpaved remainder (to Cartwright) being designated Highway 516.

=== Phase III, Cartwright Junction to Happy Valley-Goose Bay ===
Phase III is a 250 km (160 mi) section of Route 510 built for $130 million south of Lake Melville/Hamilton Inlet to connect Cartwright Junction (94 km (58 mi) south west of Cartwright) with Happy Valley-Goose Bay, completed sufficiently to open to traffic as a gravel road on 16 December 2009. During 2010, two permanent bridges, road surface work, signage, and guardrails were completed at a cost of $15 million. The road was then paved except for 36 km (22 mi) from Cartwright Junction westward to Paradise Heights (the divide between the basins of the Paradise River and the Eagle River). The remainder was completed in July 2022.

== Route 516 and supplementary routes ==
Phase II involved completion of highway north to Cartwright from Red Bay, and was opened in 2002. Although the entire route was initially designated as Route 510, upon completion of Phase III, the northern 94 km (58 mi) from Cartwright Junction (to Cartwright) was designated as Route 516.

Phase II also included other branch routes:

- Route 513 to St. Lewis
- Route 514 to Charlottetown and Pinsent Arm

A segment of Quebec Route 138 extends from Old Fort, Quebec to the Newfoundland and Labrador border connecting with Route 510 near Blanc-Sablon on the eastern end of the Côte-Nord. A gap remains between Kegashka and Old Fort, through isolated communities accessible only by coastal ferry. On August 25, 2006, the Quebec government announced a 10-year project to connect the two segments by building 425 km of highway along the Lower North Shore. As of 2022, the highway has not been completed, but in 2024 a plan was announced to complete it.

== Kilometre markers ==
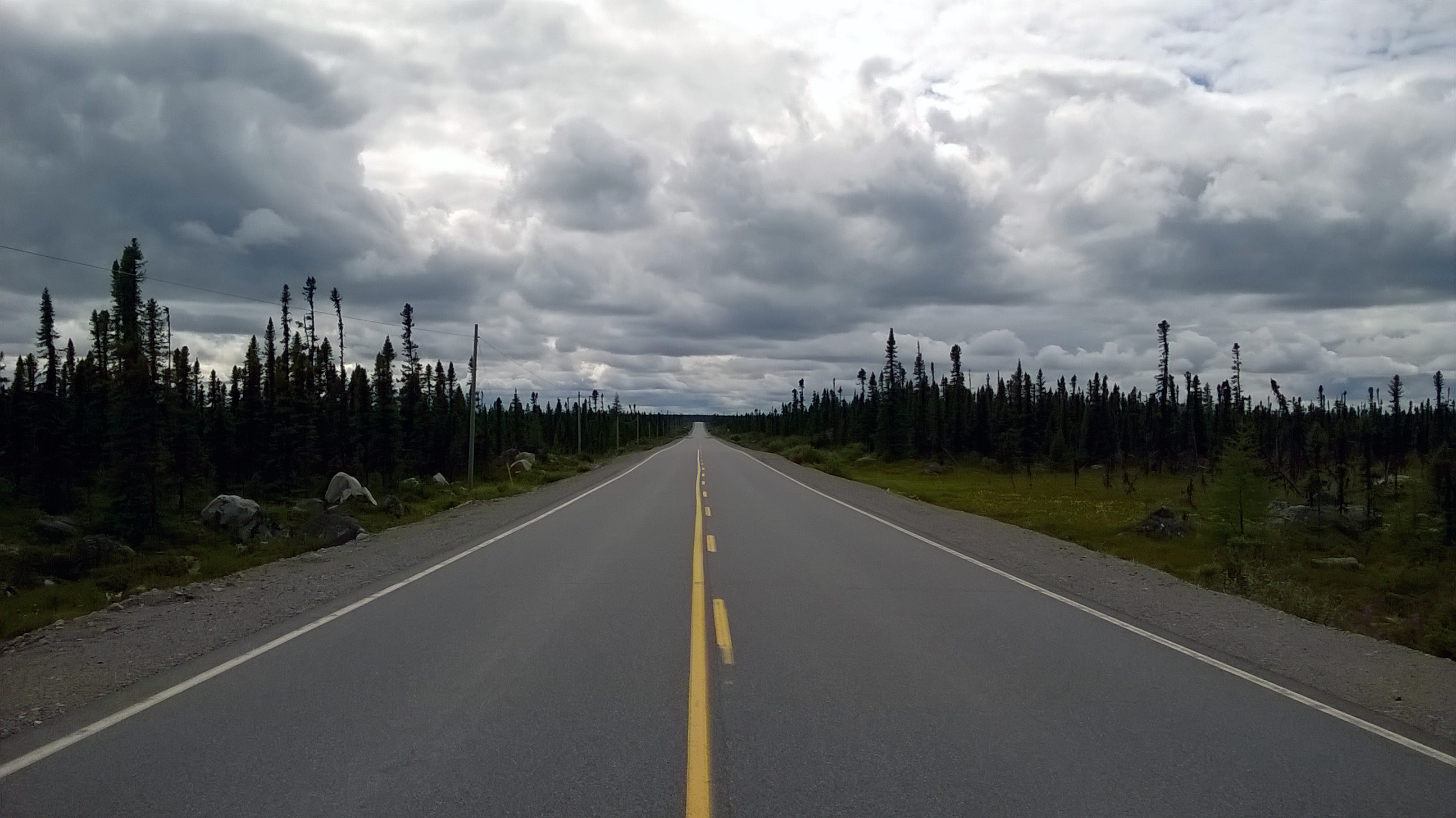
Route 500 between Labrador City and Churchill Falls

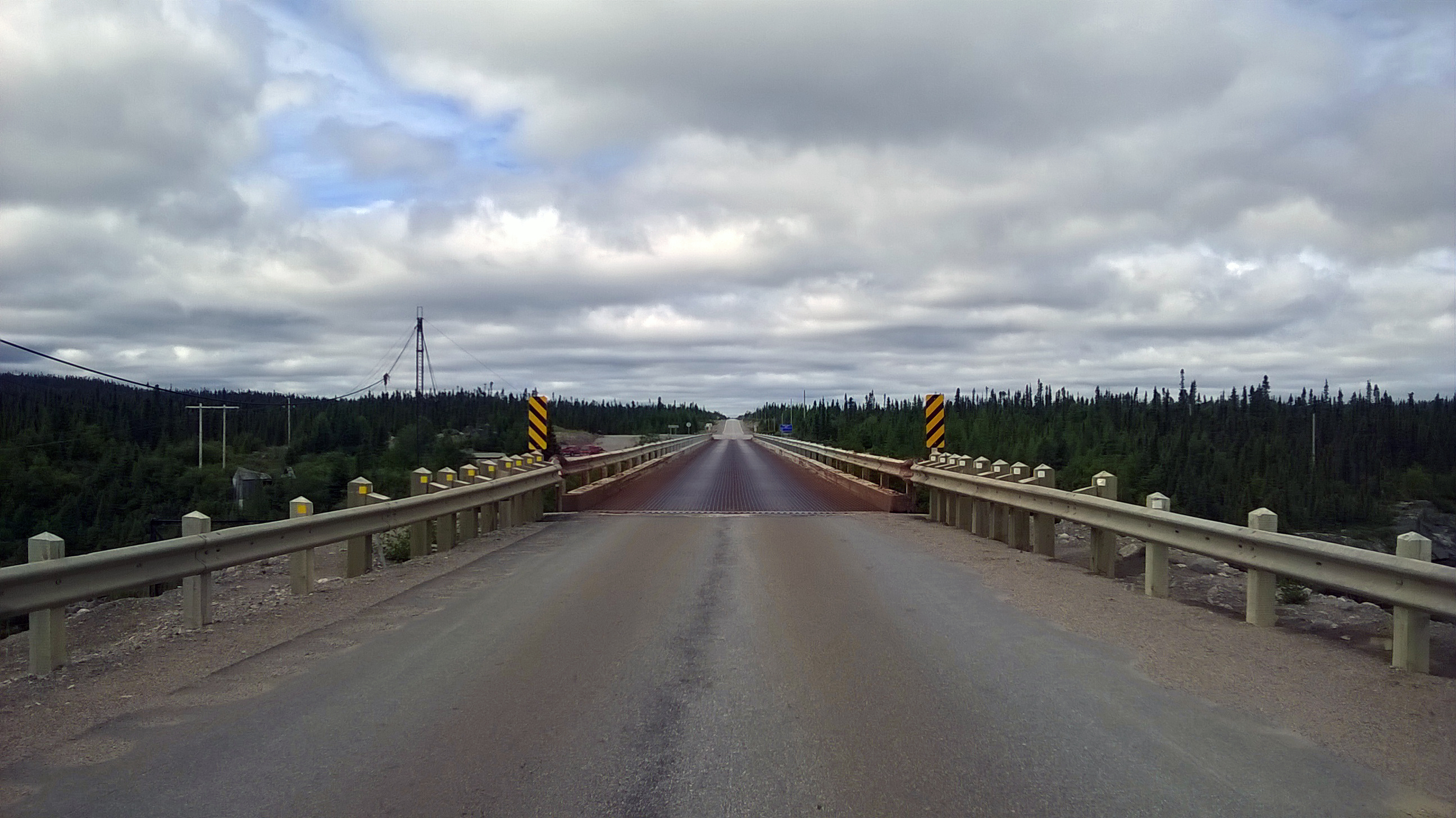
Route 500 over Churchill River Bridge

=== Route 500 ===
Location	km	mi	Destinations	Notes
	0	0.0	R-389 south – Fermont, Baie-Comeau	Services 3 km (2 mi) to the south in Fermont.
	0	0.0	Quebec border	
Labrador City	17– 19	11– 12		All services
Wabush	21	13	Route 503 south – Wabush Airport	
	58	36	spring	Drinking water (at your own risk)
	61	38	Grande Hermine Campground	Campground
Emeril	80	50	– Tshiuetin Rail Transportation Emeril Junction, Schefferville, Sept-Îles	
	140	87	Highway maintenance centre	N/A
	239	149	Crosses the Churchill River	
	239	149	Rest stop – Bowdoin Canyon Trail (Churchill Falls)	Parking, garbage bin
Churchill Falls	261– 263	162– 163	– Churchill Falls Airport	All services
	403	250	Highway maintenance centre	N/A
	424	263	Workers camp	N/A
	465	289	Rest stop	Garbage bin
	506	314	Rest stop	Garbage bin and picnic table
	538	334	Route 510 south – Port Hope Simpson	Trans-Labrador Highway follows Route 510
Happy Valley-Goose Bay	543	337	Route 520 – CFB Goose Bay, North West River	
1.000 mi = 1.609 km; 1.000 km = 0.621 mi: Route transition

=== Route 510 ===
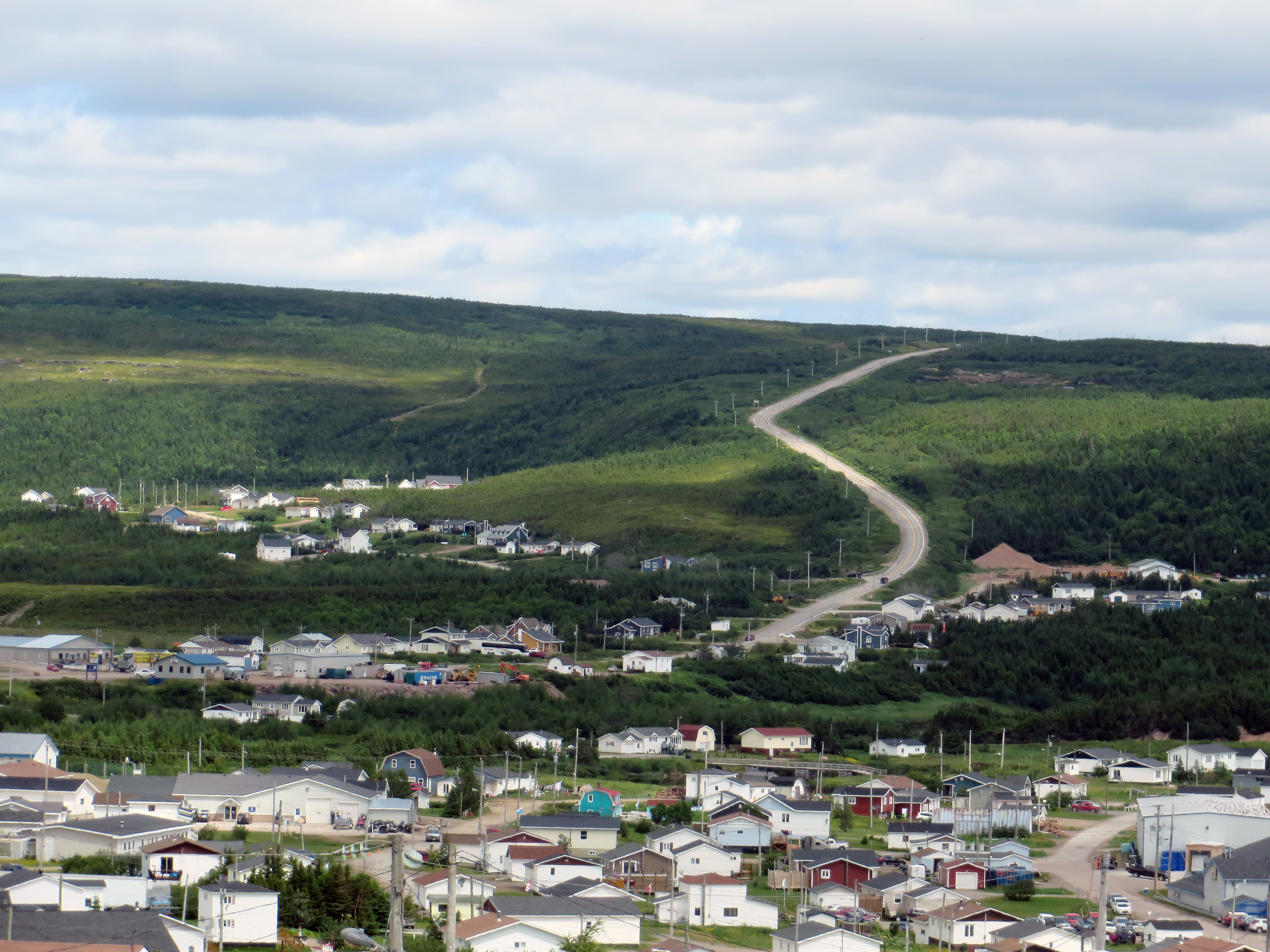
Route 510 between L'Anse-au-Loup and Pinware

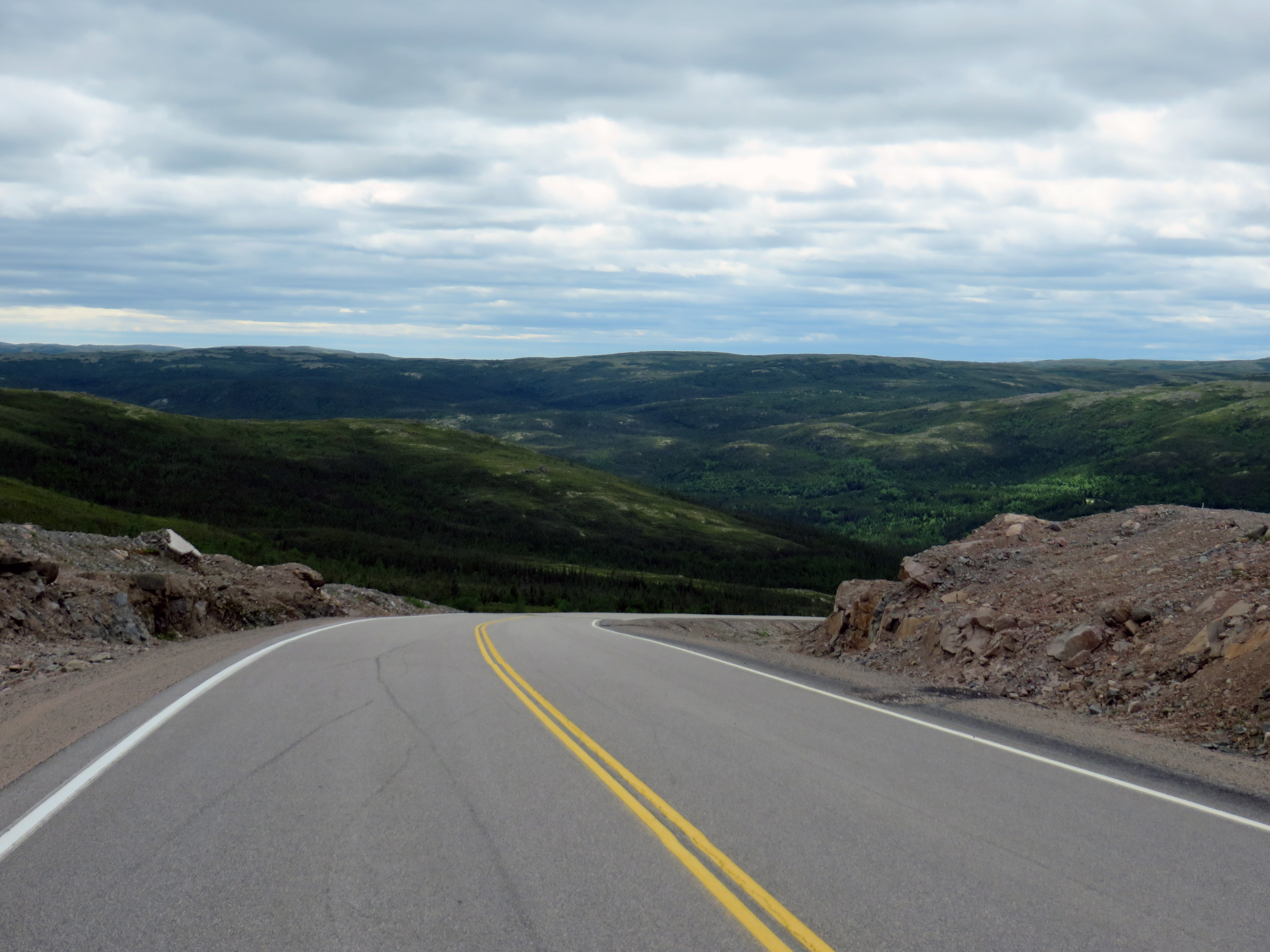
Route 510 between Pinware and Red Bay

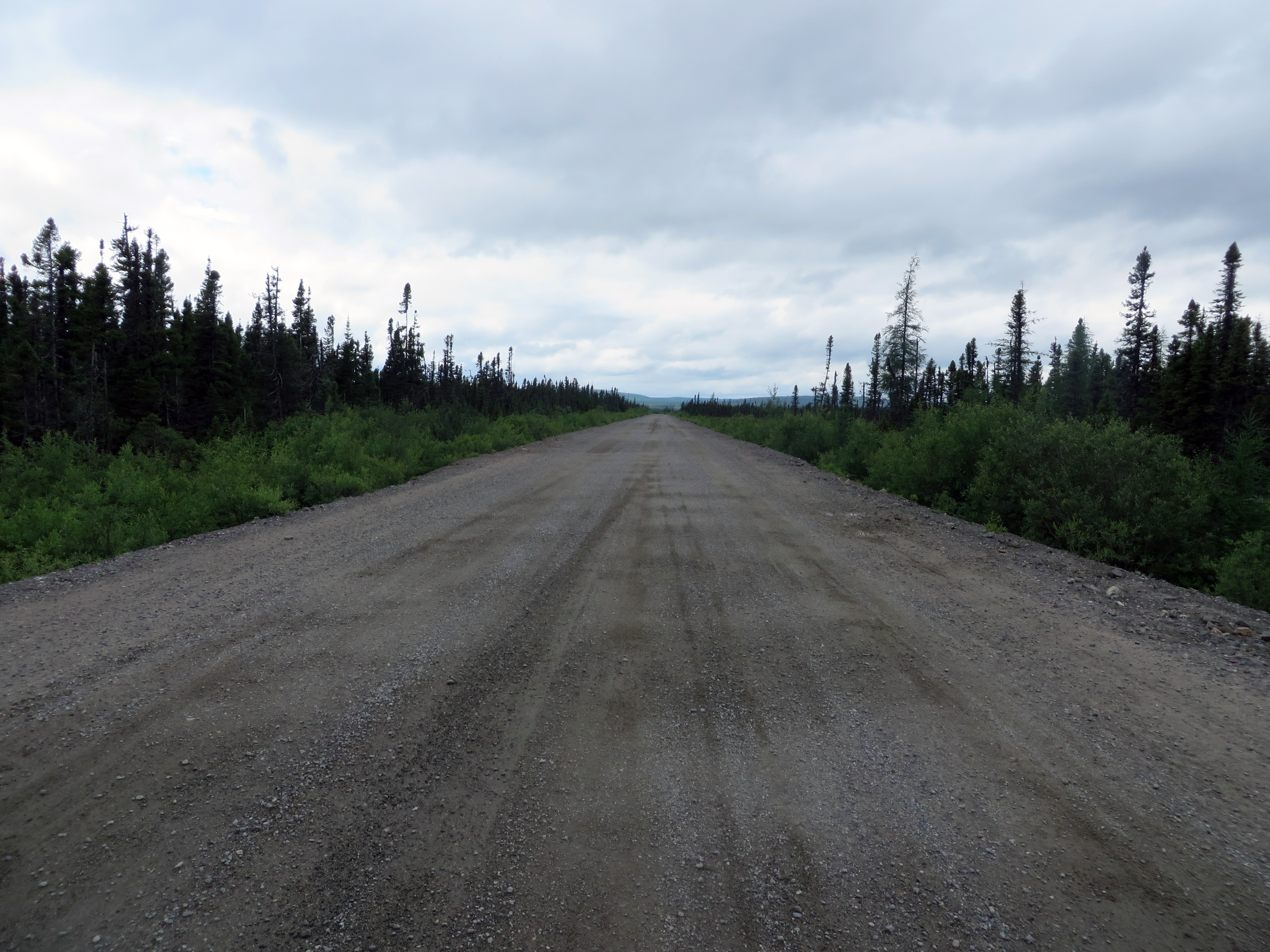
Route 510 between Port Hope Simpson and Happy Valley-Goose Bay

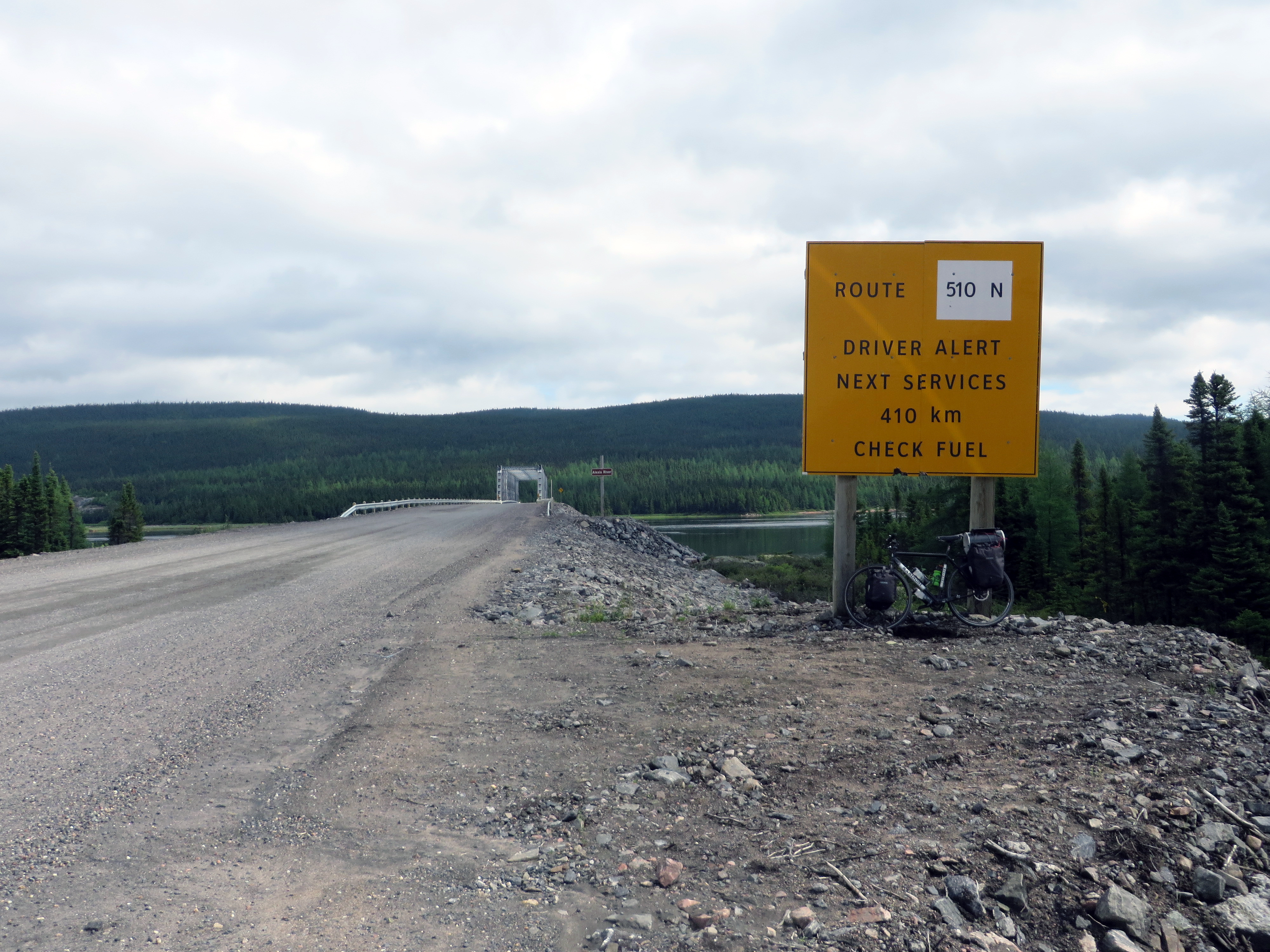
Route 510, north of Port Hope Simpson in 2016

Location	km	mi	Destinations	Notes
Blanc-Sablon (Quebec)	−4	−2.5	R-138 west – Old Fort, Lourdes-de-Blanc-Sablon Airport Avenue Jacques Cartier – Blanc-Sablon ferry terminal	Ferry connection to communities on Québec's Lower North Shore, Kegashka, St. Barbe, NL and Route 430
	0	0.0	Quebec border	
L'Anse-au-Clair	4	2.5		All services
Forteau	14	8.7		All services
L'Anse-au-Loup	28	17		All services
West St. Modeste	42	26		Restaurant and lodging
Pinware	47	29		Gas and groceries
Red Bay	77	48		All services
	109	68	Rest stop	Garbage bin
	118	73	Highway maintenance centre	N/A
Lodge Bay	155	96		Groceries; includes rest stop (2 km)
Mary's Harbour	162	101	Lodge Bay Road - Mary's Harbour	All services, except gas
	195	121	Route 513 east – St. Lewis	Gas, groceries and restaurant (17 km)
Port Hope Simpson	216	134		All services
	220	140	Route 514 north – Charlottetown, Labrador	Gas, groceries and restaurant (30 km)
	317	197	Highway maintenance centre	N/A
	319	198	Route 516 north – Cartwright	All services (94 km) (Gravel)
	321	199		Garbage bin and picnic table
	447	278	Workers camp	N/A
	465	289	Highway maintenance centre	N/A
	471	293	Workers camp	N/A
	543	337	Rest stop	N/A
	596	370	Muskrat Falls camp	N/A
	606	377	Crosses the Churchill River	
Happy Valley-Goose Bay	606	377	Route 500 – Labrador City, Churchill Falls, Happy Valley-Goose Bay	Rest stop; all services 5 km to the east; Trans-Labrador Highway follows Route 500 south
1.000 mi = 1.609 km; 1.000 km = 0.621 mi

Footnotes

== See also ==
- Churchill River (Atlantic)
- Division No. 10, Newfoundland and Labrador
- List of Newfoundland and Labrador highways
- Newfoundland-Labrador fixed link
- Newfoundland and Labrador Route 516
- Quebec Route 138
