= Doris Saunders =

Canadian journal editor (1941–2006)

Doris Jean (Martin) Saunders, CM (June 6, 1941 – May 28, 2006) was founding editor of Them Days, a quarterly journal chronicling the history of Labrador, from 1975 to 2004. She was inducted into the Order of Canada in 1986.

Saunders was born in Cartwright, Labrador, in 1941 and was the second child of six. She later moved to Happy Valley-Goose Bay. In 1975, she was hired by the Labrador Heritage Society to publish a booklet containing oral histories of people from Labrador. Saunders went on to publish Them Days as a quarterly magazine. In 1986, she was inducted as a member of the Order of Canada. She was also given an honorary Doctorate of Letters from Memorial University in 1994. Saunders was also known for her award-winning embroidery. She presented Queen Elizabeth II a piece of her embroidery during her royal visit to Labrador in the 1990s. She died from Alzheimer's disease, in St. John's, Newfoundland, in May 2006. Doris is buried in Happy Valley, Labrador, alongside her husband, Frank. Saunders had three children and three grandchildren.
