= St. Michaels Bay =

Coordinates: 52.716°N 55.897°W

St. Michaels Bay (also St. Michael Bay) is a natural bay on the coast of Labrador in the province of Newfoundland and Labrador, Canada.

The port of Charlottetown is situated near the western end of the bay.
