= Forteau =

Coordinates: 51.4733°N 56.9573°W

- Town
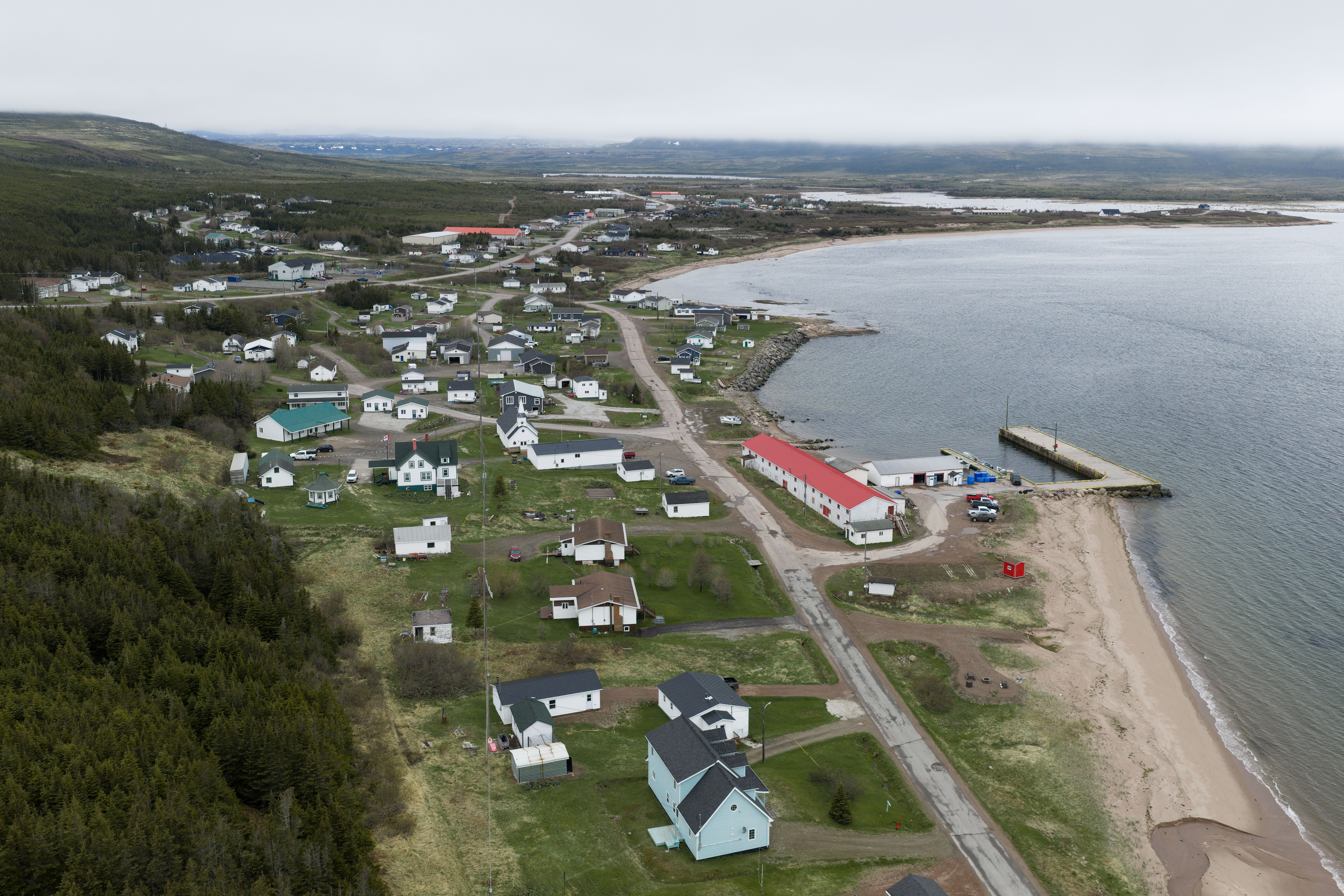
- Interactive map of Forteau
- Country: Canada
- Province: Newfoundland and Labrador

Population (2021)
  - Total: 377
- Time zone: UTC-3:30 (Newfoundland Time)
  - Summer (DST): UTC-2:30 (Newfoundland Daylight)
- Area code: 709
- Highways: Route 510 (Trans-Labrador Highway)

Forteau is a town in southern Labrador, an area of the Canadian province of Newfoundland and Labrador. The town had a population of 377 as of the Canada 2021 Census.

The town is located along Route 510 in Labrador, between L'Anse-au-Clair and L'Anse-au-Loup.

There is a health centre, a post office and a variety of shops. Internet access is available but some areas do not have consistent cell phone service.

== History ==
The end of war with France and America saw the growth of trade between Jersey and the New World, especially Canada. By 1763, around a third of the fish being exported from Conception Bay was carried by Jersey vessels. In the 1780s, a number of Jersey families settled permanently, such as the de Quettevilles in Forteau.

== Demographics ==
In the 2021 Census of Population conducted by Statistics Canada, Forteau had a population of 377 residing in 161 of its 181 total private dwellings, a change of −7.8% from its 2016 population of 409. With a land area of 7.5 km^{2} (2.9 sq mi), it had a population density of 50.3/km^{2} (130.2/sq mi) in 2021.

== See also ==
- List of cities and towns in Newfoundland and Labrador
- Forteau travel guide from Wikivoyage
