= Cape St. Charles =

Coordinates: 52°13′03.24″N 55°37′15.00″W

Location of Cape St. Charles in Newfoundland and Labrador

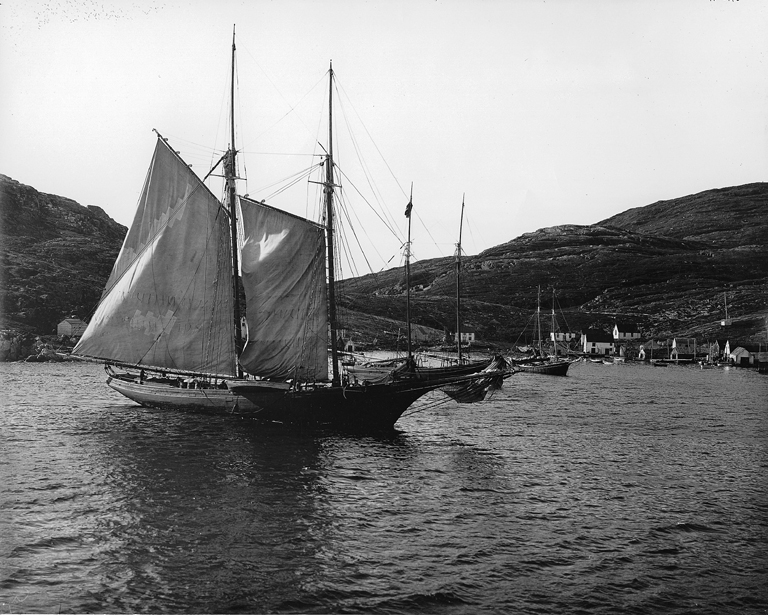
Cape St. Charles, pictured in 1908

Cape St. Charles is a headland on the coast of Labrador in the Canadian province of Newfoundland and Labrador. At longitude 55°37'15" W, it is the easternmost point of continental North America.
