= Sandwich Bay (Newfoundland and Labrador) =

Bay in Newfoundland and Labrador, Canada

Coordinates: 53.567°N 57.167°W

Sandwich Bay (Inuktitut: Natsitok) is a natural bay on the coast of Labrador in the province of Newfoundland and Labrador, Canada. The principal permanent settlement is Cartwright, located at the south entrance to the inner part of the bay. Other settlements along the bay include Paradise River and North River. Both of these communities are located at the outlets of the rivers of the same name into the bay. There is a road following the entire eastern coastline of Sandwich Bay, Newfoundland and Labrador Route 516 (Cartwright Highway).
