= Churchill Falls, Newfoundland and Labrador =

Churchill Falls
- Community

- Location within Newfoundland and Labrador
- Coordinates: 53°31′54″N 64°00′30″W
- Country: Canada
- Province: Newfoundland and Labrador
- Census division: 10
- Settled: 1967

Government
  - MHA: Keith Russell
  - MP: Philip Earle

Population (2021)
  - Total: 732
- Time zone: UTC-04:00 (AST)
  - Summer (DST): UTC-03:00 (ADT)
- Area code: 709
- Highways: Route 500 (Trans-Labrador Highway)
- Website: churchillfalls.ca

Churchill Falls is a community in the province of Newfoundland and Labrador, Canada. It is home to the Churchill Falls Generating Station and is a company town.

== History ==
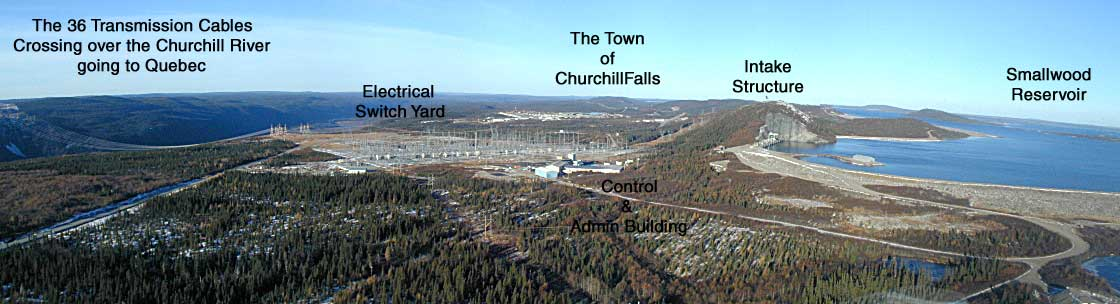
Aerial view of Churchill Falls

John McLean is believed to have been the first European to see the falls in 1839. In 1967, work on the generating station had commenced, officially inaugurated by Premier Joey Smallwood, while residential facilities also began that year. The town was built around a town complex, the Donald Gordon Centre, with amenities such as a school, gymnasium, grocery store, hotel, restaurant, library, curling club and swimming pool. Permanent housing facilities were constructed in 1969. The town is managed and operated by Newfoundland and Labrador Hydro and remains a company town to this date.

== Geography ==
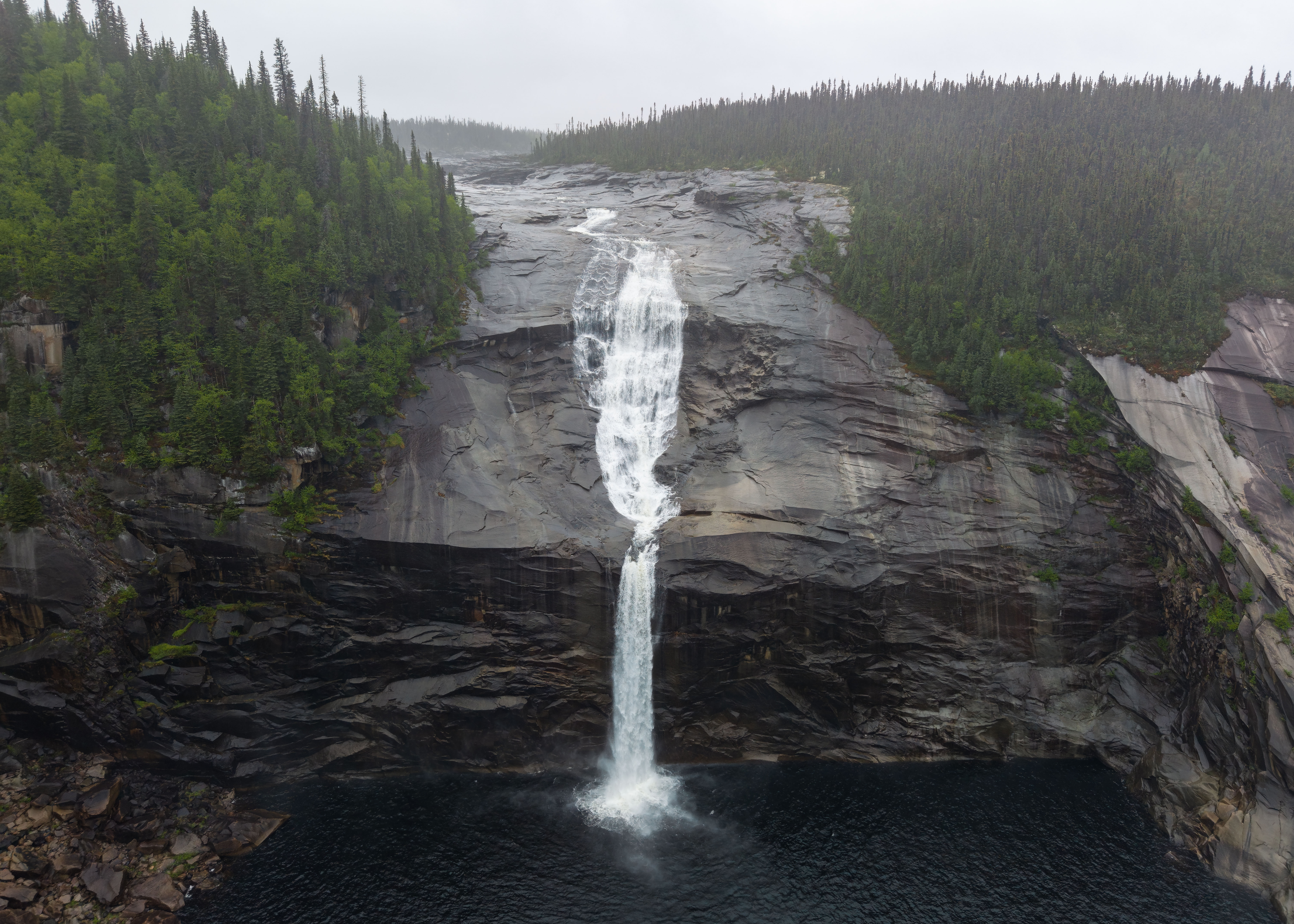
Churchill Falls natural flow was largely diverted in 1970 for hydroelectric development

Churchill Falls lies on the Churchill River near the Churchill Falls, one of the largest waterfalls in Canada. It is about 245 km (152 mi) east of Labrador City.

=== Climate ===
Under the Köppen climate classification, Churchill Falls has a subarctic climate (Dfc) with long, cold winters and short, mild summers.

Climate data for Churchill Falls Airport (1961−1990)
Month	Jan	Feb	Mar	Apr	May	Jun	Jul	Aug	Sep	Oct	Nov	Dec	Year
Record high °C (°F)	6.9 (44.4)	16.6 (61.9)	12.4 (54.3)	15.6 (60.1)	26.0 (78.8)	33.4 (92.1)	31.1 (88.0)	30.3 (86.5)	27.1 (80.8)	21.7 (71.1)	13.1 (55.6)	7.2 (45.0)	33.4 (92.1)
Mean daily maximum °C (°F)	−15.9 (3.4)	−13.4 (7.9)	−6.8 (19.8)	0.6 (33.1)	8.1 (46.6)	15.0 (59.0)	19.0 (66.2)	17.2 (63.0)	10.4 (50.7)	2.9 (37.2)	−4.2 (24.4)	−13.5 (7.7)	1.6 (34.9)
Daily mean °C (°F)	−21.5 (−6.7)	−19.7 (−3.5)	−13.2 (8.2)	−5.0 (23.0)	3.0 (37.4)	9.5 (49.1)	13.7 (56.7)	12.2 (54.0)	6.4 (43.5)	−0.4 (31.3)	−8.2 (17.2)	−18.5 (−1.3)	−3.5 (25.7)
Mean daily minimum °C (°F)	−27.3 (−17.1)	−26.1 (−15.0)	−19.7 (−3.5)	−10.8 (12.6)	−2.2 (28.0)	4.0 (39.2)	8.4 (47.1)	7.2 (45.0)	2.3 (36.1)	−3.9 (25.0)	−12.4 (9.7)	−23.6 (−10.5)	−8.7 (16.3)
Record low °C (°F)	−43.3 (−45.9)	−45.6 (−50.1)	−38.3 (−36.9)	−30 (−22)	−22.8 (−9.0)	−5.4 (22.3)	0.9 (33.6)	−0.6 (30.9)	−7 (19)	−19.4 (−2.9)	−31.3 (−24.3)	−40.6 (−41.1)	−45.6 (−50.1)
Average precipitation mm (inches)	64.4 (2.54)	51.4 (2.02)	62.8 (2.47)	66.0 (2.60)	56.8 (2.24)	94.7 (3.73)	114.0 (4.49)	93.1 (3.67)	110.6 (4.35)	80.7 (3.18)	82.0 (3.23)	68.2 (2.69)	944.7 (37.19)
Average rainfall mm (inches)	0.8 (0.03)	1.9 (0.07)	3.7 (0.15)	10.5 (0.41)	36.3 (1.43)	87.8 (3.46)	114.0 (4.49)	93.0 (3.66)	98.2 (3.87)	37.7 (1.48)	10.6 (0.42)	3.4 (0.13)	497.9 (19.60)
Average snowfall cm (inches)	71.6 (28.2)	55.8 (22.0)	64.7 (25.5)	57.5 (22.6)	20.2 (8.0)	6.5 (2.6)	0.0 (0.0)	0.0 (0.0)	11.9 (4.7)	44.0 (17.3)	76.8 (30.2)	72.1 (28.4)	481.0 (189.4)
Average precipitation days (≥ 0.2 mm)	18	15	16	16	15	17	19	19	20	20	21	20	216
Average rainy days (≥ 0.2 mm)	0	0	2	4	10	16	19	19	18	9	3	1	102
Average snowy days (≥ 0.2 cm)	18	15	16	14	7	2	0	0	5	15	19	20	132
Mean monthly sunshine hours	98.7	127.0	141.8	161.9	201.4	193.5	206.2	184.8	100.7	69.9	54.4	78.0	1,618.4
Percentage possible sunshine	39	46	39	39	41	38	40	40	26	21	21	33	36
Source 1: Environment Canada
Source 2: NOAA (percent sun)

=== Bedrock Geology ===
Churchill Falls is underlain by Precambrian granitoid gneiss which is locally intruded by gabbro. Other bedrock nearby include tonalitic gneiss, amphibolite, monzonite, quartz monzonite and granite.

== Demographics ==
Historical populations
Year	Pop.	±%
2006	681	—
2011	634	−6.9%
2016	705	+11.2%
2021	732	+3.8%

Churchill Falls is a part of the Division No. 10, Subdivision D. As of the 2021 census, it had a population of 732. There were a total of 556 private dwellings. The population was spread out, with 175 being from age 0 to 14, 535 from age 15 to 64, and 20 being age 65 or older. The average age was 34.0. English was the mother tongue of 705 residents, while French was the mother tongue of the remaining 15. A total of 60 residents claimed to be of First Nations heritage, while 40 were Métis.

== Sports and recreation ==
The Terry Smith Memorial Arena, named after a longtime resident, is one of the most popular facilities in town. The Churchill Falls Gymnasium serves the needs of the Eric G. Lambert School as well as badminton and hockey teams. The curling club is based at the Donald Gordon Center. There are also soccer fields and a swimming pool in the community.

== Transportation ==
Churchill Falls is connected by the Trans-Labrador Highway with Labrador City and Baie-Comeau in Quebec, its main transportation link.

Churchill Falls Airport has served the community as a privately owned airport since 1971. There is no formal terminal building, just a few small structures and the runway. There are scheduled flights to Goose Bay and Wabush by PAL Airlines.

== See also ==
- Churchill Falls
- Churchill Falls Generating Station
- Lower Churchill Project
- List of cities and towns in Newfoundland and Labrador
