= St. Lewis, Newfoundland and Labrador =

St. Lewis Ilha de Frey Luis Fox Harbour
- Town
- Location of St. Lewis St. Lewis (Canada)
- Coordinates: 52°22′07″N 55°40′57″W
- Country: Canada
- Province: Newfoundland and Labrador

Government
  - Type: Town Council
  - Mayor: Helen Poole
  - MP: Philip Earle

Area
  - Total: 9.25 km^{2} (3.57 sq mi)

Population (2021)
  - Total: 181
- Time zone: UTC−03:30 (NST)
  - Summer (DST): UTC−02:30 (NDT)
- Postal Code: A0K 4W0
- Area code: 709
- Highways: Route 513 (St. Lewis Highway)

St. Lewis is a community on the coast of Labrador in the province of Newfoundland and Labrador, Canada. Formerly known as Fox Harbour, St. Lewis is the most easterly permanent community on the North American mainland. The community of St. Lewis enjoys a long and vibrant history as one of the earliest recorded places in all of Labrador by Europeans. Settled in the early 18th century (by Europeans), the area’s sheltered location, proximity to good fishing grounds and seal migration routes made the settlement a desired location for both the European-based migratory fishery, and the native Inuit families who inhabited the south Labrador coast.

== Geography ==
The town lies neatly within a sheltered harbour at the mouth of St. Lewis Bay. Like most of the landscape along the east coast of Labrador, barren, rocky slopes scourged by the frigid Labrador Current extend throughout the St. Lewis Sound. The subarctic climate of the south Labrador coast generally offers a pleasant cool summer climate, which is soon replaced with a snow-covered, ice-chilled winter season. This harsh environment, with a few trifling exceptions, nourishes a hardy boreal ecosystem. Collective forests of black spruce, white spruce and balsam fir are confined to interior valleys and riverbanks where the geography affords mild protection against the elements. Yet, the bleak, rocky shore of the Labrador coastline strongly resembles an Arctic tundra biome.

St. Lewis is the easternmost permanent community on the North American mainland. The community’s physical location provides an advantageous vantage point to view the southward procession of icebergs and floe-ice commencing every summer. St. Lewis is recognized by Newfoundland and Labrador Tourism as located in the province's renowned "Iceberg Alley".

== History ==
St. Lewis is one of the earliest recorded place names in Labrador. It was depicted on maps as early as 1502-1503 as Ilha de Frey Luis.

The Loder family from Harbour Grace had established a fish trading business and constructed premises in the community; now restored, it houses exhibits relating the history of St. Lewis. The community has been a radar site since 1957, when the United States constructed Fox Harbour Air Station, a radar site as part of the Pinetree Radar System. A Loran C station was operated by the Canadian Coast Guard at St. Lewis. In January 2010, it was announced that the Loran C signal would be terminated. The broadcasting of the Loran C signal ceased in August 2010.

In 2012, the local fish plant closed.

== Demographics ==
In the 2021 Census of Population conducted by Statistics Canada, St. Lewis had a population of 181 living in 72 of its 93 total private dwellings, a change of −6.7% from its 2016 population of 194. With a land area of 10.04 km^{2} (3.88 sq mi), it had a population density of 18.0/km^{2} (46.7/sq mi) in 2021.

== See also ==
- List of municipalities in Newfoundland and Labrador
- NunatuKavut
- St. Lewis (Fox Harbour) Airport
