= Charlottetown, Newfoundland and Labrador =

Town in Canada

Coordinates: 52°45′57″N 56°08′43″W

Location of Charlottetown, Labrador

Charlottetown is a town in Labrador with a population of 292 (2021 census) in the Canadian province of Newfoundland and Labrador. It was said to be founded by Benjamin Powell in 1950 and named for Charlottetown, Prince Edward Island: "I thought that maybe someday the place would be the capital of the bay, the same way Charlottetown is the capital of Prince Edward Island."

Situated on the sheltered inlet St. Michaels Bay on the Labrador coast, Charlottetown was served by a coastal ferry service until the completion of the Trans-Labrador Highway in 2002 (now Route 514). There is also a small airstrip.

Charlottetown provides a bridgehead and services to the remote community of Norman's Bay.

Many people have occupations related to the shrimp fishery. Most of the occupations in Charlottetown consist of the Shrimp Plant (Labrador Choice Seafood Ltd.).

Charlottetown contains three restaurants: Wentzell's Takeout (often referred to as Wentzies), Seatown Cafe, and Little John's Takeout. There is also an old fishing community near by named Square Islands. The majority of the people that live in Charlottetown used to live in Square Islands.

There are two retail stores, Labrador Retail Ltd. and Powell's store. There is an all-grade school in Charlottetown named William Gillett Academy.

== Demographics ==
In the 2021 Census of Population conducted by Statistics Canada, Charlottetown had a population of 292 living in 113 of its 140 total private dwellings, a change of 0.7% from its 2016 population of 290. With a land area of 26.47 km^{2} (10.22 sq mi), it had a population density of 11.0/km^{2} (28.6/sq mi) in 2021.

== See also ==
- Royal eponyms in Canada
