= Port Hope Simpson =

- Town
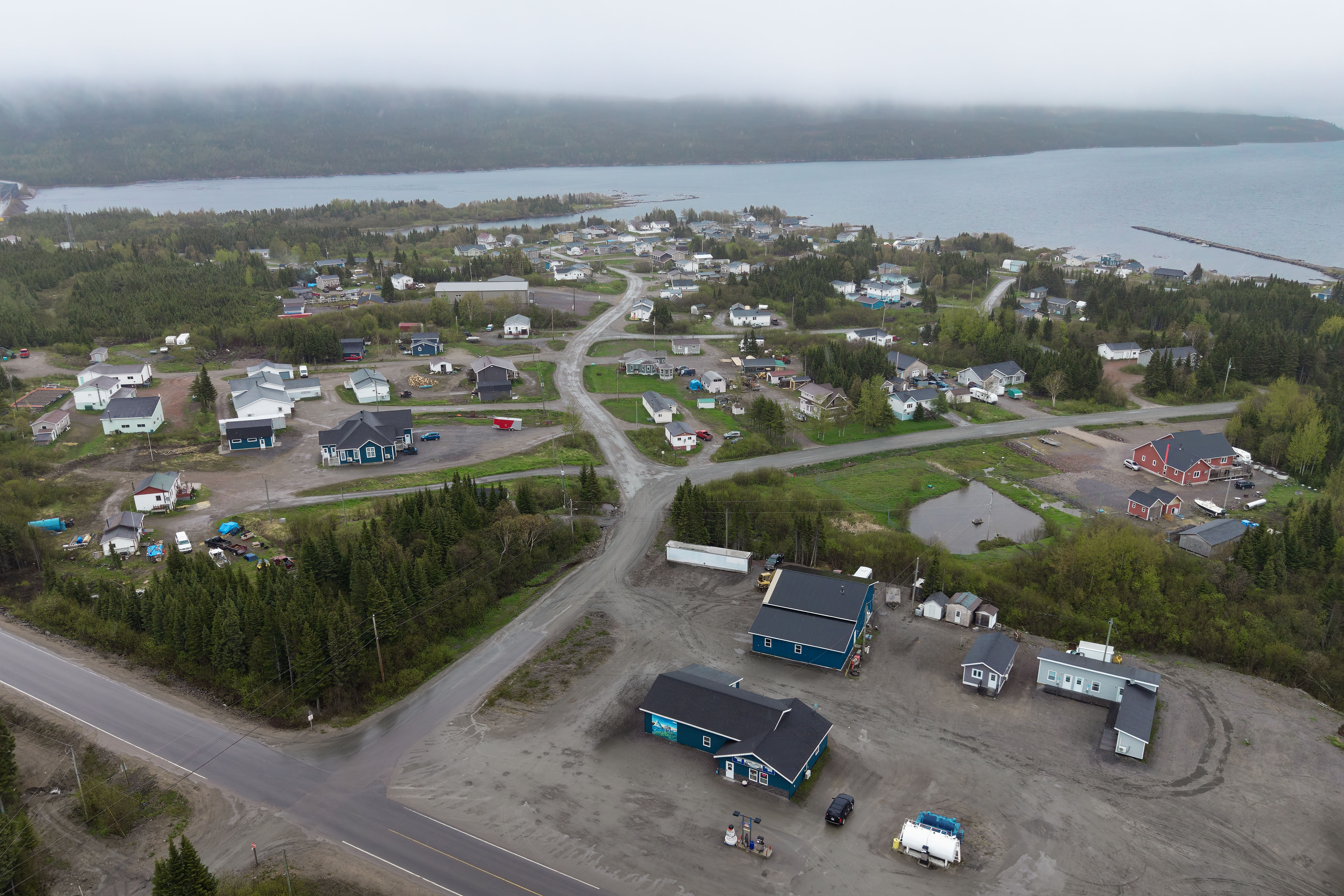
- Aerial view (2026)

- Location of Port Hope Simpson in Newfoundland Port Hope Simpson (Canada)
- Coordinates: 52°32′N 56°18′W
- Country: Canada
- Province: Newfoundland and Labrador
- Settled: 1934

Area
  - Land: 32.52 km^{2} (12.56 sq mi)

Population (2021)
  - Total: 403
  - Density: 12.7/km^{2} (33/sq mi)
- Time zone: UTC−03:30 (NST)
  - Summer (DST): UTC−02:30 (NDT)
- Area code: 709
- Highways: Route 510 (Trans-Labrador Highway)

Port Hope Simpson is a town located on the southeastern Labrador coast, 215 km (134 mi) from the Quebec/Southern Labrador border in Canada. In 1944 it was named after John Hope Simpson as a company town.

With the completion of the Trans-Labrador Highway that crosses the region, the town has benefitted from an increase in tourism.

The nearby Shinneys Water Complex has 2,500 km^{2} (970 sq mi) of over 1,000 islands rising dramatically above sea level. These protected waters are ideal for all types of boating and the adjoining Alexis River is a popular fishing destination for Atlantic salmon.

== History ==
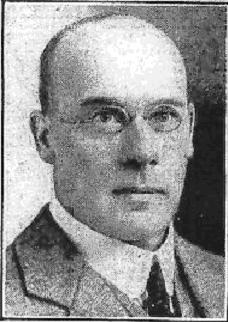
John Hope Simpson

When the Labrador Development Company left in 1948, paid work in the woods left with it until Bowater arrived 14 years later. The first post office was established on October 21, 1950. The first postmaster was Hayward Green. At the time, the population was 311.

New economic activity took place between 1962 and 1968 as Bowater picked up the pioneering venture laid down by John Osborn Williams, Sir John Hope Simpson and the Labrador Development Company. More trees were felled for their pulp and paper mills at Corner Brook, and in Kent, England. Bowater brought benefits of regular paid employment (though seasonal), 20 mi (32 km) of forest roads and the government contributed by sharing the cost of building a new wharf. But apart from the post office, the general store and the two schools there was no all-year-round paid employment from 1969 to 1970.

From 1970 to 1992 cod and salmon fishing was the economic mainstay of the area but unemployment prevailed most of the year. In 1992 the cod fishery was closed down altogether. However, many local fishermen made a relatively easy transition into crab, shrimp and scallop fishing.

Government funding for the construction works of the Trans-Labrador Highway, the Port Hope Simpson bridge and the Port Hope Simpson Airport has increased the town's accessibility as a tourist destination on the Labrador coast.

From the early 1990s on, Port Hope Simpson's fishing, logging, timber products, transportation, retail and public services, tourist facilities and amenities have contributed to the sustainable growth of the town.

The town previously served as a ferry port for the nearby town of William's Harbour. William's Harbour was entirely resettled in 2017. The town has a small air-strip, Port Hope Simpson Airport. As of March 2017, Port Hope is not listed as a scheduled destination in the Air Labrador flight schedule.

== Demographics ==
In the 2021 Census of Population conducted by Statistics Canada, Port Hope Simpson had a population of 403 living in 159 of its 186 total private dwellings, a change of −2.2% from its 2016 population of 412. With a land area of 32.02 km^{2} (12.36 sq mi), it had a population density of 12.6/km^{2} (32.6/sq mi) in 2021.
