= Cartwright, Newfoundland and Labrador =

Cartwright Natsitok
- Town
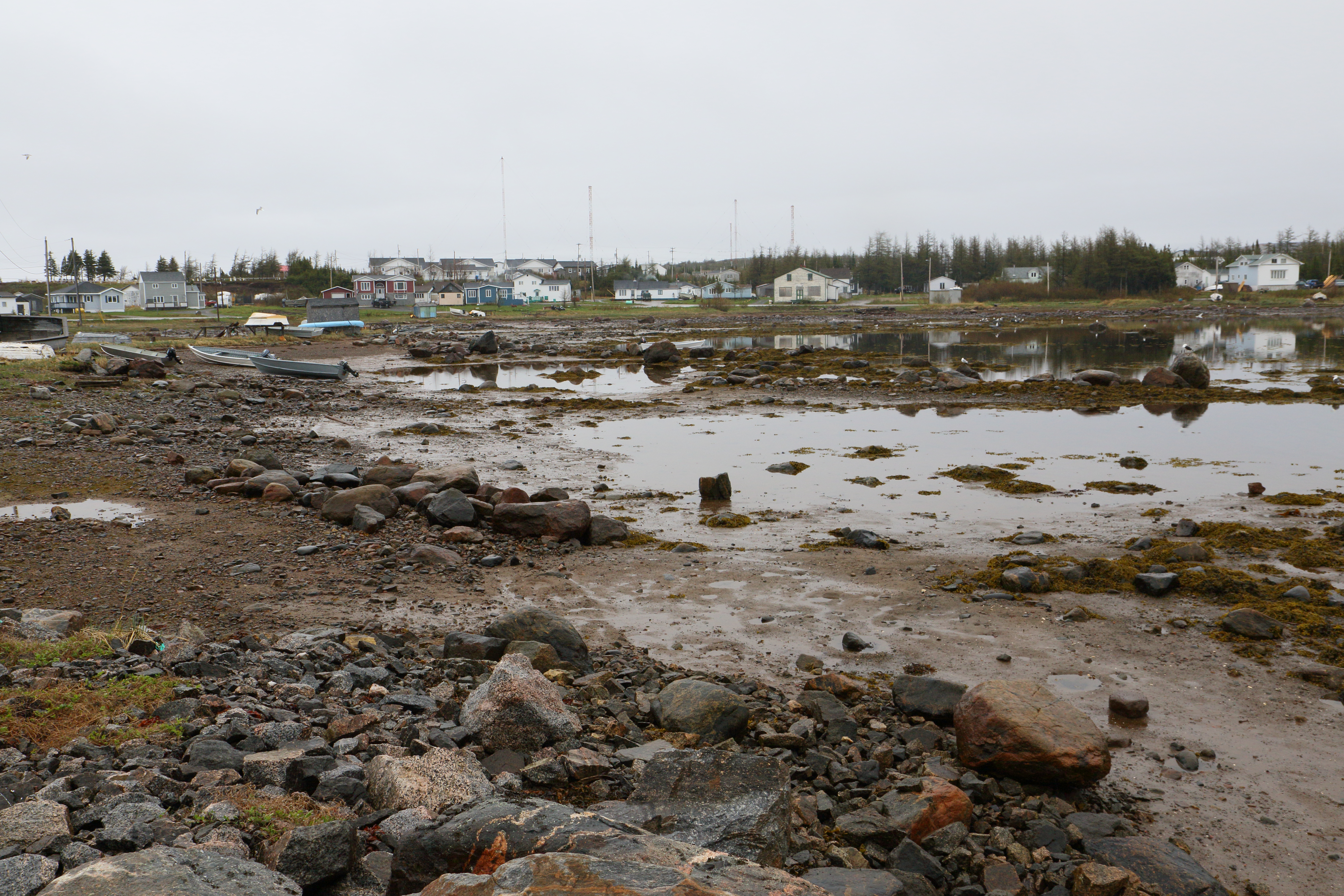

- Location in Newfoundland and Labrador
- Coordinates: 53°42′24″N 57°01′11″W
- Country: Canada
- Province: Newfoundland and Labrador
- Census division: No. 10, subdiv. B
- Settled: 1775
- Incorporated: 1956

Government
  - Mayor: Clint Clark
  - MP: Carter Clark

Area
  - Land: 5.87 km^{2} (2.27 sq mi)
- Elevation: 10 m (33 ft)

Population (2021)
  - Total: 439
  - Density: 74.8/km^{2} (194/sq mi)
- Time zone: UTC−04:00 (AST)
  - Summer (DST): UTC−03:00 (ADT)
- Area code: 709
- Highways: Route 516 (Cartwright Highway)

Cartwright is a community located on the eastern side of the entrance to Sandwich Bay, along the southern coast of Labrador in the province of Newfoundland and Labrador, Canada. It was incorporated in 1956.

Sandwich Bay is an area with a longstanding Inuit presence known to resident Inuit as Natsiktok or place of the ring seals. Archeological evidence, especially that excavated by Dr. Lisa Rankin, indicates an early and year round Inuit presence.

== History ==
Cartwright has been a settled community since 1775. In 1775, Captain George Cartwright, for whom the place is named, settled there, establishing a fish and fur trading business. He left Labrador in 1786, maintaining a business interest there until it was sold to Hunt and Henley in 1815.

The residents of Sandwich Bay (including Cartwright) were described by Rev. Bishop Field in 1848 as either 'pure Esquimaux' or 'Anglo-Esquimaux, with an admixture of old English settlers'.

In 1873, the Hudson's Bay Company bought the fishery and trading post from A.B. Hunt & Company, together with Grady Harbour, Sandhill, and Round Island. In the early 20th century, the fur trade went into decline, so the post's main business was pickling and preserving salmon. In 1959, the business became part of the HBC Northern Stores Department. HBC divested this department in 1987 to The North West Company, which still operates a Northern Store in Cartwright.

Since 2002, Cartwright has been connected by road (a section of the Trans-Labrador Highway, Route 516) with Blanc Sablon, Quebec, where there is a car ferry to Newfoundland. Since December 2009 the remaining link between Cartwright and Happy Valley-Goose Bay, Labrador has been completed and open to the public.

== Demographics ==
In the 2021 Census of Population conducted by Statistics Canada, Cartwright, Labrador had a population of 439 living in 204 of its 243 total private dwellings, a change of 2.8% from its 2016 population of 427. With a land area of 5.87 km^{2} (2.27 sq mi), it had a population density of 74.8/km^{2} (193.7/sq mi) in 2021.

Historical census populations
Cartwright, NL

Year	Pop.	±%
1961	493	—
1966	616	+24.9%
1971	752	+22.1%
1976	675	−10.2%
1981	658	−2.5%
1986	674	+2.4%
1991	611	−9.3%

Year	Pop.	±%
1996	628	+2.8%
2001	629	+0.2%
2006	552	−12.2%
2011	504	−8.7%
2016	427	−15.3%
2021	439	+2.8%

Source: Statistics Canada

== Climate ==
Cartwright has a subarctic climate (Dfc) with long cold and very snowy winters, and short, cool summers. Owing to its maritime location, the winters are however a little milder than on most of the Labrador Peninsula, but snow depth from the stormy Icelandic Low, which circulates cold and saturated air around the region, is extreme: it averages around 160 centimetres (63 in) at its peak early in March and has reached as high as 351 centimetres (138 in) on April 7, 2003. Snow is usually fully melted early in June and is established again in early November. Unlike most of Labrador, there is no permafrost because of the insulation from the deep snow cover, although the annual mean temperature is 0.4 °C (32.7 °F).

Climate data for Cartwright Climate ID: 8501106; coordinates 53°40′57″N 57°02′31″W; elevation: 14.3 m (47 ft); WMO ID: 71818; 1991–2020 normals, extremes 1934–present
Month	Jan	Feb	Mar	Apr	May	Jun	Jul	Aug	Sep	Oct	Nov	Dec	Year
Record high °C (°F)	11.8 (53.2)	11.7 (53.1)	16.4 (61.5)	20.5 (68.9)	31.3 (88.3)	35.3 (95.5)	36.1 (97.0)	35.7 (96.3)	30.0 (86.0)	23.3 (73.9)	19.7 (67.5)	14.1 (57.4)	36.1 (97.0)
Mean daily maximum °C (°F)	−9.0 (15.8)	−8.6 (16.5)	−3.2 (26.2)	2.6 (36.7)	7.8 (46.0)	14.4 (57.9)	18.5 (65.3)	18.6 (65.5)	13.9 (57.0)	7.3 (45.1)	1.3 (34.3)	−4.2 (24.4)	4.9 (40.8)
Daily mean °C (°F)	−13.7 (7.3)	−13.8 (7.2)	−8.4 (16.9)	−1.8 (28.8)	3.4 (38.1)	9.1 (48.4)	12.8 (55.0)	13.3 (55.9)	9.3 (48.7)	4.2 (39.6)	−1.7 (28.9)	−8.0 (17.6)	0.4 (32.7)
Mean daily minimum °C (°F)	−18.3 (−0.9)	−18.8 (−1.8)	−13.4 (7.9)	−6.2 (20.8)	−1.2 (29.8)	3.7 (38.7)	7.2 (45.0)	7.8 (46.0)	4.7 (40.5)	1.0 (33.8)	−4.8 (23.4)	−11.7 (10.9)	−4.2 (24.4)
Record low °C (°F)	−37.8 (−36.0)	−34.5 (−30.1)	−32.2 (−26.0)	−25.6 (−14.1)	−15.0 (5.0)	−5.6 (21.9)	−1.7 (28.9)	−0.6 (30.9)	−5.0 (23.0)	−11.7 (10.9)	−22.0 (−7.6)	−33.9 (−29.0)	−37.8 (−36.0)
Average precipitation mm (inches)	87.6 (3.45)	92.4 (3.64)	92.3 (3.63)	78.6 (3.09)	69.4 (2.73)	91.2 (3.59)	107.3 (4.22)	102.7 (4.04)	94.3 (3.71)	116.1 (4.57)	80.6 (3.17)	87.1 (3.43)	1,099.5 (43.29)
Average rainfall mm (inches)	8.7 (0.34)	10.9 (0.43)	11.8 (0.46)	21.3 (0.84)	51.9 (2.04)	89.4 (3.52)	107.3 (4.22)	102.7 (4.04)	93.6 (3.69)	104.7 (4.12)	40.4 (1.59)	19.7 (0.78)	662.4 (26.08)
Average snowfall cm (inches)	79.5 (31.3)	82.9 (32.6)	80.2 (31.6)	56.9 (22.4)	17.7 (7.0)	1.9 (0.7)	0.0 (0.0)	0.0 (0.0)	0.9 (0.4)	11.2 (4.4)	40.2 (15.8)	67.4 (26.5)	438.6 (172.7)
Average precipitation days (≥ 0.2 mm)	16.4	14.2	16.4	14.8	16.4	16.9	19.4	17.2	17.8	18.7	15.5	16.1	199.6
Average rainy days (≥ 0.2 mm)	2.8	2.3	4.0	6.8	13.1	16.7	19.4	17.2	17.7	17.0	8.3	4.8	130.1
Average snowy days (≥ 0.2 cm)	15.8	13.6	15.3	11.4	6.4	0.8	0.0	0.0	0.3	4.3	10.3	14.2	92.3
Average relative humidity (%) (at 1500 LST)	78.8	77.9	78.4	76.0	72.9	68.9	69.8	68.5	68.8	74.3	80.4	80.7	74.6
Mean monthly sunshine hours	85.3	116.0	122.2	138.0	164.2	163.5	186.9	192.5	116.3	93.2	70.4	64.8	1,513.2
Percentage possible sunshine	34.1	42.1	33.3	32.9	33.3	32.1	36.5	41.9	30.4	28.4	27.2	27.7	33.3
Source: Environment Canada (sun 1981–2010)

== See also ==
- Blackguard Bay
- List of cities and towns in Newfoundland and Labrador
- NunatuKavut
