= High Marnham =

Coordinates: 53.222430°N 0.793108°W

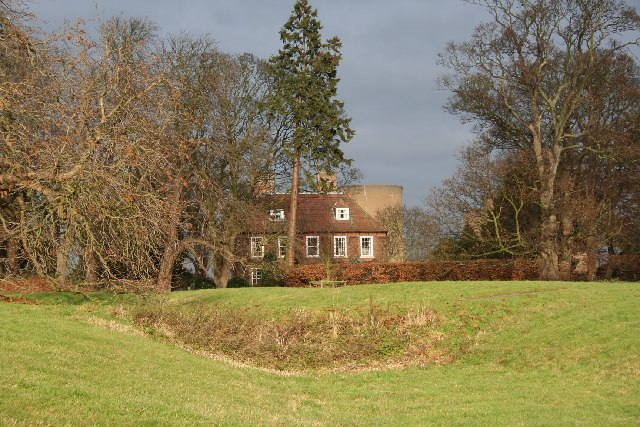
- Marnham Hall

- Location within Nottinghamshire
- Interactive map of High Marnham
- OS grid reference: SK 80676 70164
  - London: 120 mi (190 km) SE
- Civil parish: Marnham
- District: Bassetlaw
- Shire county: Nottinghamshire
- Region: East Midlands
- Country: England
- Sovereign state: United Kingdom
- Post town: Newark-on-Trent
- Postcode district: NG23
- Police: Nottinghamshire
- Fire: Nottinghamshire
- Ambulance: East Midlands
- UK Parliament: Newark

High Marnham is a village within the Marnham civil parish in Bassetlaw district, of the county of Nottinghamshire, England. It is 120 miles north of London, 23 miles north east of the city of Nottingham, and 17 miles north east of the market town of Mansfield. There is one listed building in the village.

== Toponymy ==
The name "Marnham" means 'Mearna's homestead/village', although little knowledge on this owner exists. The prefix is due to the village being the 'higher' of the two Marnham villages.

== Geography ==
=== Location ===
High Marnham is surrounded by the following local areas:

- Fledborough to the north
- Low Marnham to the south
- South Clifton to the east
- Skegby to the west.

=== Settlement ===
This is centred around Hollowgate Lane and the unnamed lane into Low Marnham. The lane runs nearby the River Trent before looping back to the Sutton-on-Trent - Rampton Marnham Road. It is located 1/2 mile (750 m) north of Low Marnham and separated by greenfield land. It is approximately of equal size to Low Marnham. High Marnham presently maintains amenities such as a public house, caravan sites and park homes, but became particularly prominent with the presence of the former ferry to South Clifton across the River Trent, and High Marnham power station being sited close to the village until decommissioning in 2003.

==== Water features ====
The River Trent forms the east boundary of the parish, High Marnham is around 2/5 mile (500 m) inland.

The Trent until the 19th century occasionally changed its course and one of these is called Old Trent, it brought the river much closer to the villages. Old Trent remains presently as a small stream. A subsidiary stream from this running under the lane to Low Marnham marks the edge of the village.

There is a fishing lake at a caravan site along the unnamed lane between the Marnham villages.

==== Land elevation ====
Along the bank of the Trent is very low-lying, at approximately 5 metres (16 ft). High Marnham is a little higher than this being inland, at 10–15 metres (33–49 ft).

== Governance and demography ==
The three settlements Low Marnham, High Marnham and Skegby are combined as Marnham parish for administrative identity.

It is managed at the first level of public administration by Marnham with Normanton-on-Trent Parish Council.

At district level, the wider area is managed by Bassetlaw District Council.

Nottinghamshire County Council provides the highest level strategic services locally.

== History ==
=== Medieval history ===
Roger de Busli at the time of the Domesday (1086) was the key landowner of the Marnham manor as well beyond. From this, William de Kewles became lord of these manors, and from this they passed to the Chaworths. Elizabeth, the daughter and heiress of Sir George Chaworth, carried the holdings through marriage to Sir William Cope. By 1853 Earl Brownlow was the principal owner and lord of the manor of Marnham.

=== Marnham Hall ===
Marnham Hall comprised a large manor house, Grade II listed, set within large grounds and located close to the River Trent at High Marnham. The oldest part of the hall dates to the 16th century, with remodelling and re-facing in the early 18th century. it was the home of the Cartwright family who had 'made good' through a family connection to Thomas Cranmer. For 250 years they were the dominant family here and their memorials carpet the sanctuary floor in St Wilfrids church at Low Marnham.

They are most famous for the 'golden generation' born in the mid-1700s where three brothers became quite notable. There was the explorer 'Labrador' George Cartwright who brought a small group of Inuit to stay at Marnham although most died of smallpox soon after. He and his brother John Cartwright or 'Jack' explored in Newfoundland alongside George and have a town (Cartwright) bearing their name - and a memorial. George ran out of money and the Hall had to be bought back from the mortgage by the younger brother John. He further tried to help out his brother Edmund, a clergyman who invented the power loom in 1784 but who then got into difficulties trying to run a textiles business. The 'Revolution Mill' they set up in Retford was not a success. Edmund lived in Low Marnham until the end of the 18th century, and later built Ossington Hall.

Edmund was also the father of the famous 'Mrs Markham', children's writer Elizabeth Penrose. He created other inventions such as the wool-combing machine, and was also vicar of Marnham in the 1770s. Jack sold Marnham to the Brownlows and moved to Lincolnshire, after which there was refurbishment involving part of the hall being demolished and rebuilt around 1789–1793. The Brownlows seat was Belton House in Lincolnshire, and so Marnham was let to tenant farmers. The estate remained in the Brownlow/Cust family until the death of the 3rd Earl in 1921, although there were sales of portions of the Marnham area from 1920.

=== Later history ===
By the late 19th century High Marnham village was also called Ferry or Upper Marnham.

The ferry service, in place for many centuries between Marnham and South Clifton was in use until the early 20th century.

=== High Marnham power station ===
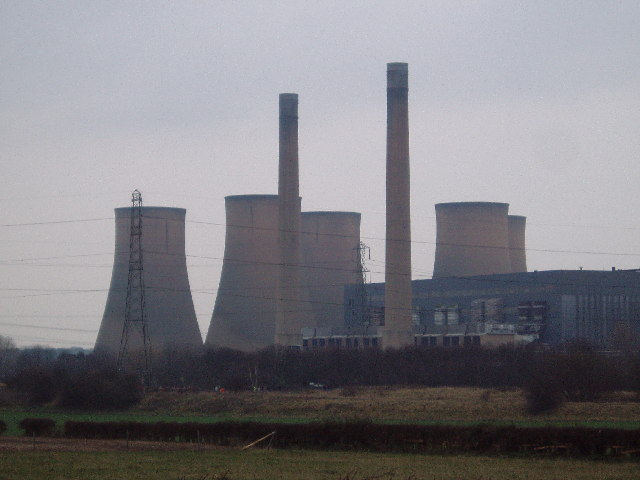
High Marnham power station in 2003

This former power station was located 1/2 mile (750 m) north of High Marnham. The plant was commissioned in 1958, officially opened in October 1962, and closed in 2003 after 45 years of operation. An electrical substation remains in operation on site.

== Community & leisure ==
There is one public house, The Brownlow Arms, in High Marnham.

Caravan parks and park homes are also located in and around High Marnham.

There is a boat club at the River Trent.

== Landmarks ==
=== Listed buildings ===
There is only one listed building in the village, Marnham Hall. It is listed at Grade II, portions of which date from the 16th century, but substantially from the 18th century.

== Notable people ==
- George Cartwright (1739–1819), explorer
- John 'Jack' Cartwright (1740–1824), political reformer and naval officer
- Edmund Cartwright (1743–1823), inventor and clergyman
