= Marnham =

Marnham is an English surname.

== People ==
Notable people with the name include:

- Christian Marnham, British film director
- Francis John Marnham (1853–1941), British politician and businessman
- Patrick Marnham (born 1943), English writer, journalist and biographer

== Places ==
- Marnham, Nottinghamshire, a civil parish in England, which comprises:
  - High Marnham
  - Low Marnham
