= Listed buildings in Marnham, Nottinghamshire =

Marnham is a civil parish in the Bassetlaw District of Nottinghamshire, England. The parish contains seven listed buildings that are recorded in the National Heritage List for England. Of these, one is listed at Grade I, the highest of the three grades, and the others are at Grade II, the lowest grade. The parish contains the settlements of High Marnham, Low Marnham and Skegby, and the surrounding countryside. The listed buildings consist of a church, two houses, a pigeoncote, a village hall, a farmhouse and farm buildings.

== Key ==
Grade	Criteria
I	Buildings of exceptional interest, sometimes considered to be internationally important
II	Buildings of national importance and special interest

== Buildings ==
Name and location	Photograph	Date	Notes	Grade
St Wilfrid's Church; 53.21551°N 0.79324°W		13th century	The church has been altered and extended through the centuries, and it was restored by Edward Browning in1846. It is built in stone with slate roofs, and consists of a nave with a clerestory, north and south aisles, a south porch, a chancel, a north chapel and a west tower. The tower has two stages, diagonal buttresses, a plinth, bands, gargoyles, and an embattled parapet with crocketed pinnacles. On the west side is a three-light window with a hood mould, above are clock faces, and the bell openings have two lights and hood moulds. There is also an embattled parapet on the nave.	I
Marnham Hall; 53.22146°N 0.79168°W		Early 18th century	The house is in red brick on a plinth, with a moulded floor band, dentilled eaves and a hipped pantile roof. There are two storeys, an attic and a basement, a main range of five bays, and a later two-storey rear wing. Four steps lead up to the central doorway that has a rusticated brick surround and a traceried fanlight. Most of the windows are sashes with wedge lintels, in the attic are two hipped dormers, and the basement has a window with a single mullion.	II
Pigeoncote, Skegby Manor; 53.22104°N 0.82496°W	—	Mid 18th century	The pigeoncote is in red brick on a stone plinth, with a floor band, dentilled eaves, an eaves band, and a pantile roof with coped gables and kneelers. There are two and a half storeys and attics, and a lean-to on the front. In the south side is a doorway, and the east and west sides contain pigeon openings and perches.	II
Skegby Manor; 53.22073°N 0.82501°W	—	Late 18th century	A red brick house on a stone plinth, with floor bands, dentilled eaves, and a pantile roof with coped gables. There are two storeys and attics, three bays, a lower two-storey single-bay wing to the left, and rear extensions. The central doorway has a traceried fanlight, and is flanked by casement windows. The upper floors contain sash windows, and all the openings have keystones.	II
Village hall and wall 53.21584°N 0.79365°W		1823	A school, later used for other purposes, it is in red brick with blue brick dressings, and a slate roof. There is a single storey and a T-shaped plan, with a front of three bays. The windows have two cusped lights, lead lozenge glazing bars, and segmental blue brick arches. Recessed on the left is a later porch containing a doorway with a segmental blue brick arch, and in the right gable is an inscribed and dated stone plaque. In front of the hall is a low red brick wall with iron railings, containing a gateway with an iron gate.	II
Crew yard and barn range, Grange Farm; 53.21720°N 0.79630°W		Early 19th century	The buildings are in brick, the crew yard with two segmental-arched coped gables, dogtooth bands and imposts, and slit vents. At the rear is a barn with dentilled eaves and a pantile roof, attached to the right is a lower stable wing, and to the left is a stable block and two cow sheds.	II
Grange Farm Farmhouse; 53.21689°N 0.79669°W	—	Early 19th century	The farmhouse is in red brick with dogtooth eaves and a hipped pantile roof. There are two storeys and attics, three bays, and a later two-storey rear extension. The central doorway has a reeded surround, a rectangular fanlight, and a moulded cornice with paterae. The windows in the lower two floors are sashes, in the top floor they are casements, and all have concrete rendered wedge lintels.	II
