= Frances Dorothy Cartwright =

English poet and biographer

Frances Dorothy Cartwright (1780–1863) was an English poet and biographer.

== Life ==
Frances Cartwright was the youngest child of the Rev. Edmund Cartwright, inventor of the power-loom, by his first wife, Alice Whitaker. She was born 28 October 1780 at Marnham, Nottinghamshire or Goadby Marwood, Leicestershire. Her sister Elizabeth, under the pseudonym Mrs Markham, wrote A History of England; another sister, Mary Strickland, wrote a biography of their father in 1843; and their brother Edmund, who became a clergyman, wrote a Parochial Topography of the Rape of Bramber (1830). ("Rape" here is an obscure word meaning a county subdivision; that of Bamber centres on the River Adur.)

Frances's mother died on 12 September 1785, and after her father married again she was adopted by her uncle, the reforming politician John Cartwright, and sent to school at Richmond, to the west of London. She started writing small poems in 1802. In 1823, influenced by Spanish activists against King Ferdinand VII who had been hosted by her uncle (see Trienio Liberal), she learnt Spanish and translated a few of Rafael del Riego's poems into English.

On the death of her uncle in 1824 she prepared her first published work, The Life and Correspondence of Major Cartwright, published in 1826. An uncritical account, it had no competitors until 1972. She retired with Major Cartwright's widow to live at Worthing, and published her poems there anonymously, in a little volume, Poems, chiefly Devotional, dated 13 November 1835. Her translations of Riego's poems appeared, with her initials, in the poet's Obras Póstumas Poéticas (1844). She died at Brighton on 13 January 1863, aged 83.
