= Cartwright Gardens =

Park and street in Bloomsbury, London, England

Coordinates: 51.5268°N 0.1270°W

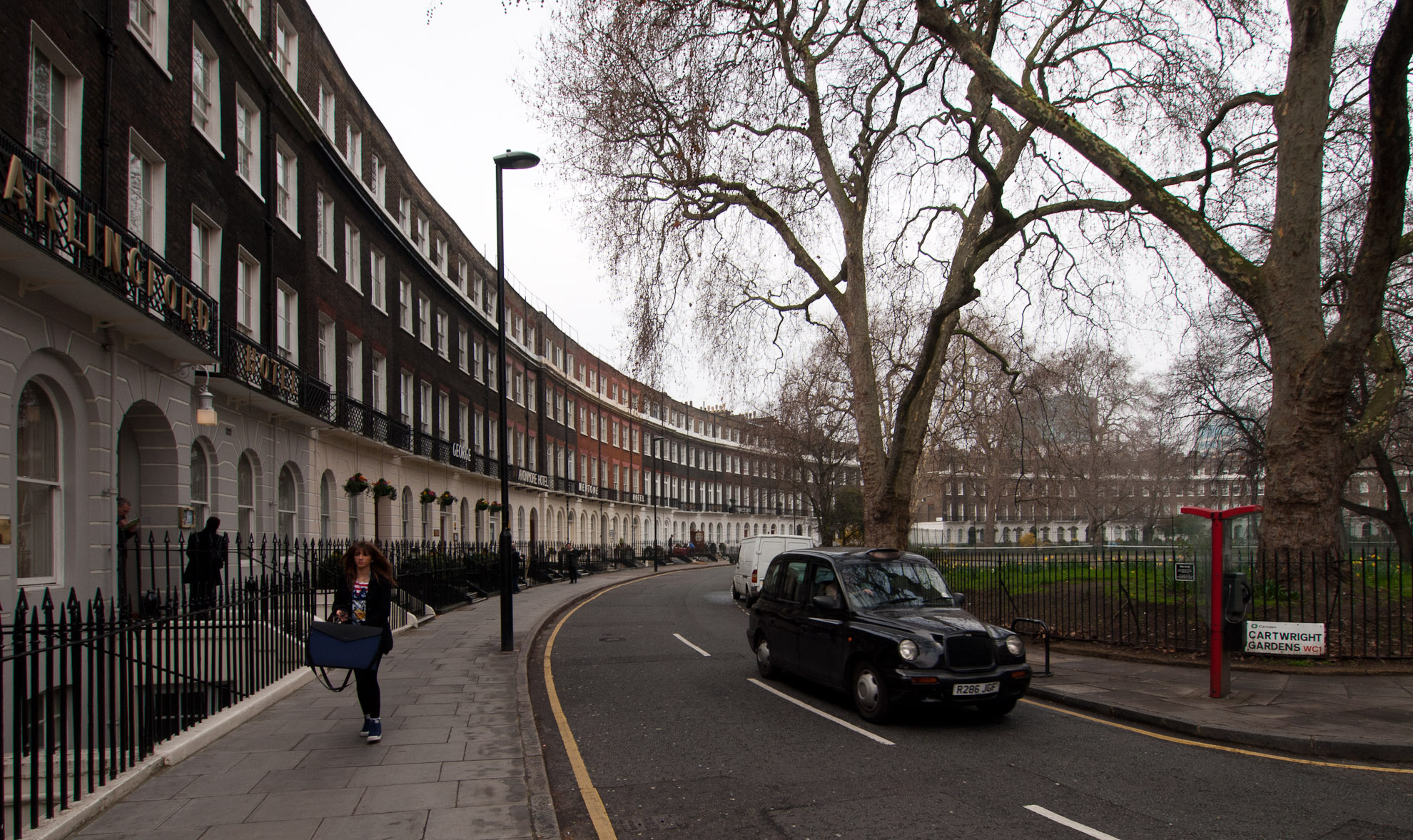
West side of Cartwright Gardens in 2011

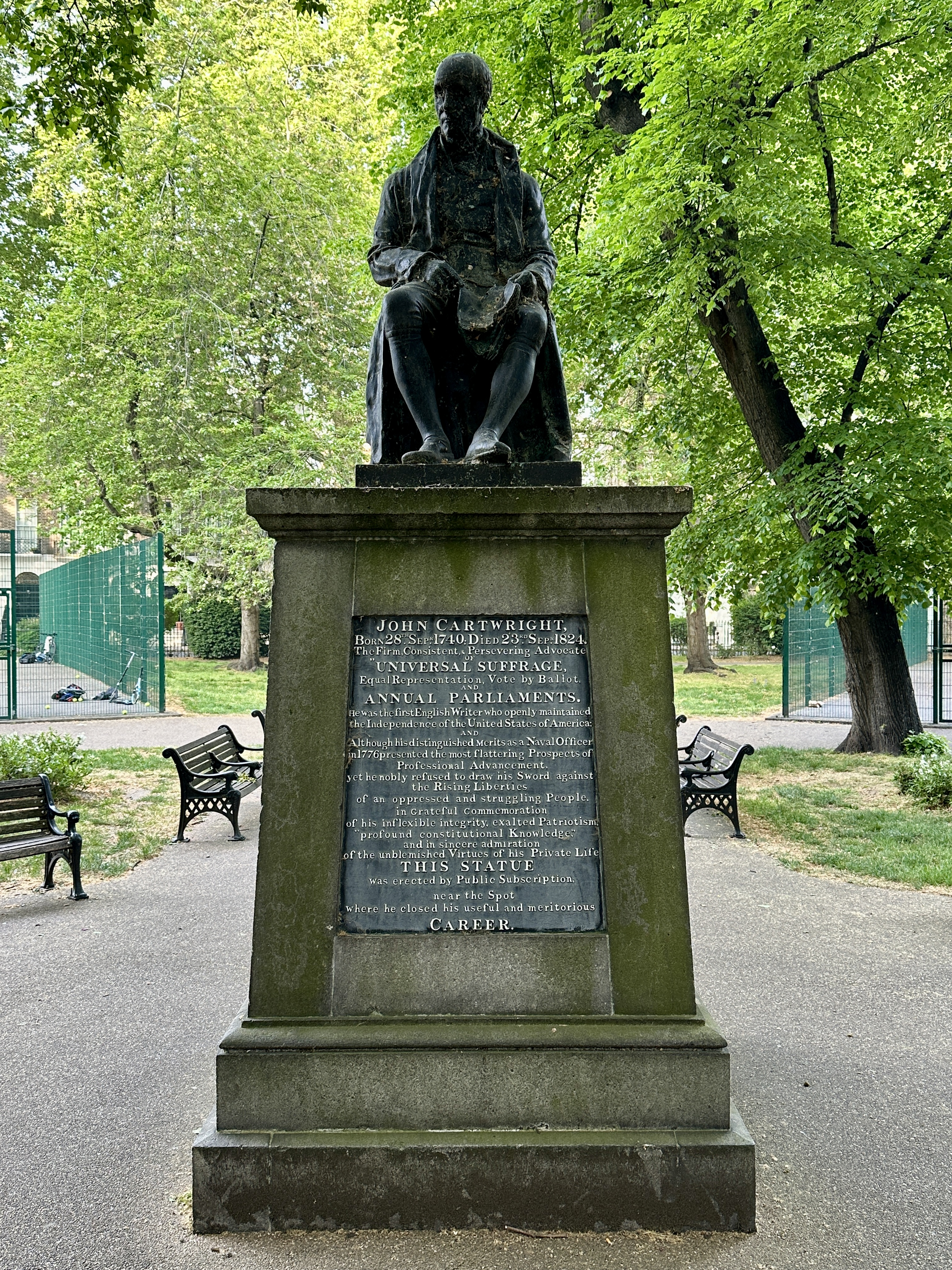
Statue of John Cartwright, installed in 1831

Cartwright Gardens is a crescent-shaped park and street in Bloomsbury, London.

The houses were originally built between 1809 and 1811 as part of The Skinners' Company Estate and named Burton Crescent after their designer and developer James Burton. It attracted upper middle class residents until the end of the 19th century, when lodging houses were established in its buildings.

Burton Crescent was renamed Cartwright Gardens in 1908 after the political reformer and local resident John Cartwright. A bronze statue by George Clarke was added to the garden in 1831 which is set on a granite plinth that has details of Cartwright's works as a reformer. The garden is enclosed by iron railings, with mature plane trees, laid out with grass and circular walks. Unusually the gardens also have several tennis courts available for residents of the surrounding buildings and hotels.

The crescent is made up of several hotels set in their original Georgian buildings. The east side of the gardens was gradually demolished during the first half of the 20th century. Canterbury Hall, a block of flats built in an Art Deco style, was built here in the 1930s. It later became an intercollegiate halls of residence for the University of London. It was joined by two further halls of residence for the University of London: Commonwealth Hall in the 1950s and Hughes Parry Hall in 1969. These buildings were replaced by the Garden Halls in 2014–2016, although the tower block section of Hughes Parry Hall still stands.

27-43 and 46-63 are listed Grade II on the National Heritage List for England.

== Notable residents ==
- Number 1 - Edwin Chadwick, social reformer
- Number 2 - Rowland Hill, Post Office reformer
- Number 3 - Thomas Joshua Platt, judge and baron of the Exchequer
- Number 9 - John Galt, novelist
- Number 10 - Edward Buckton Lamb, architect
- Number 11 - Sir John Perring, 1st Baronet, banker, MP and Lord Mayor of London
- Number 20 then 34 - Sydney Smith, writer and cleric
- Number 37 - John Cartwright, political reformer
- Number 44 - John Charles Mason, civil servant
- Number 45 - John William Wright, painter
- Number 47 - James White, writer and advertising agent
- Number 51 - Horatio Smith, poet
- Number 58 – Duncan Forbes, linguist
- Number 63 - Amy Audrey Locke, writer and historian (resident in the early twentieth century)
- Number 63 - Amy Drucker, artist (resident from the early twentieth century to the 1950s)

== 19th century murders ==
In the late 19th century, two murders were committed in Burton Crescent which were never solved.

In December 1878, elderly widow Rachel Samuel was found dead in her kitchen at 4 Burton Crescent. She had been beaten and her wedding ring, some coins and her boots were stolen. A former servant, Mary Donovan, was arrested but there was insufficient evidence to prove she was the culprit.

In March 1884, Annie Yates was found murdered in her room in a brothel at 12 Burton Crescent. She was beaten and strangled by a customer and some money and a ring were taken. The culprit was never caught.

Both premises in which the crimes were committed were on the east side of the gardens and were demolished in the 20th century.

== In popular culture ==
In The Small House at Allington by Anthony Trollope, Burton Crescent is home to the character John Eames.

The Cartwright Gardens Murder Case by J. S. Fletcher is set in the street.
