= Francis Penrose =

English architect and astronomer (1817–1903)

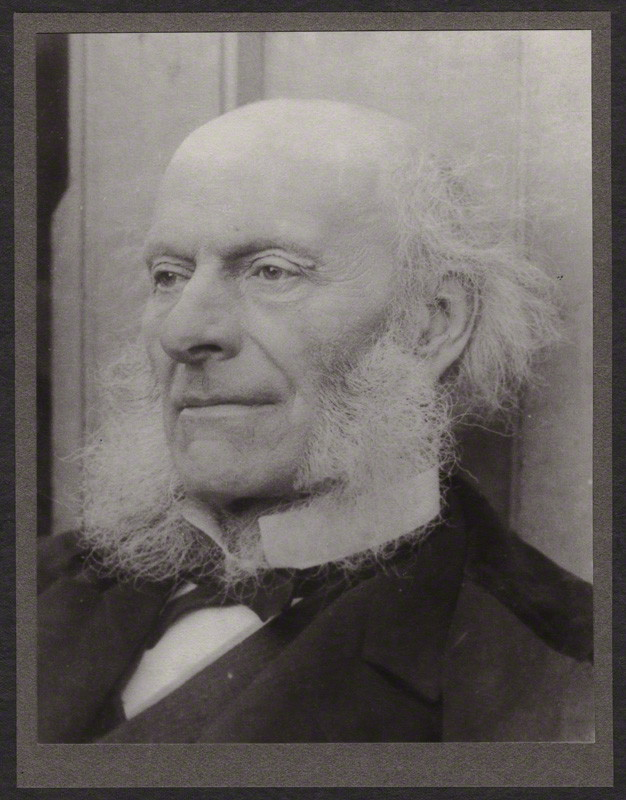
- Born: 29 October 1817
- Died: 15 February 1903 (aged 85); Wimbledon
- Occupation: Architect, art historian, archaeologist
- Employer: British School at Athens (1886–1887)
- Spouse(s): Harriette Penrose
- Children: Emily Penrose, Francis George Penrose
- Parent(s): John Penrose; Mrs Markham
- Relatives: Charles Penrose, John Penrose

Francis Cranmer Penrose FRS (29 October 1817 – 15 February 1903) was a British architect of Cornish parentage, archaeologist, astronomer and sportsman rower. He served as Surveyor of the Fabric of St Paul's Cathedral, and as President of the Royal Institute of British Architects and Director of the British School at Athens.

== Early life ==
Penrose was born at Bracebridge, Lincolnshire, the third son of Rev. John Penrose who was vicar there, and his wife Elizabeth Cartwright. His mother was the daughter of Edmund Cartwright and a teacher and author of children's books under the name Mrs Markham.

Penrose was educated at Bedford Modern School, Bedford School, Winchester College and Magdalene College, Cambridge. He rowed for Cambridge in the Boat Race in the 1840, 1841 and 1842 races.

== Architectural career ==
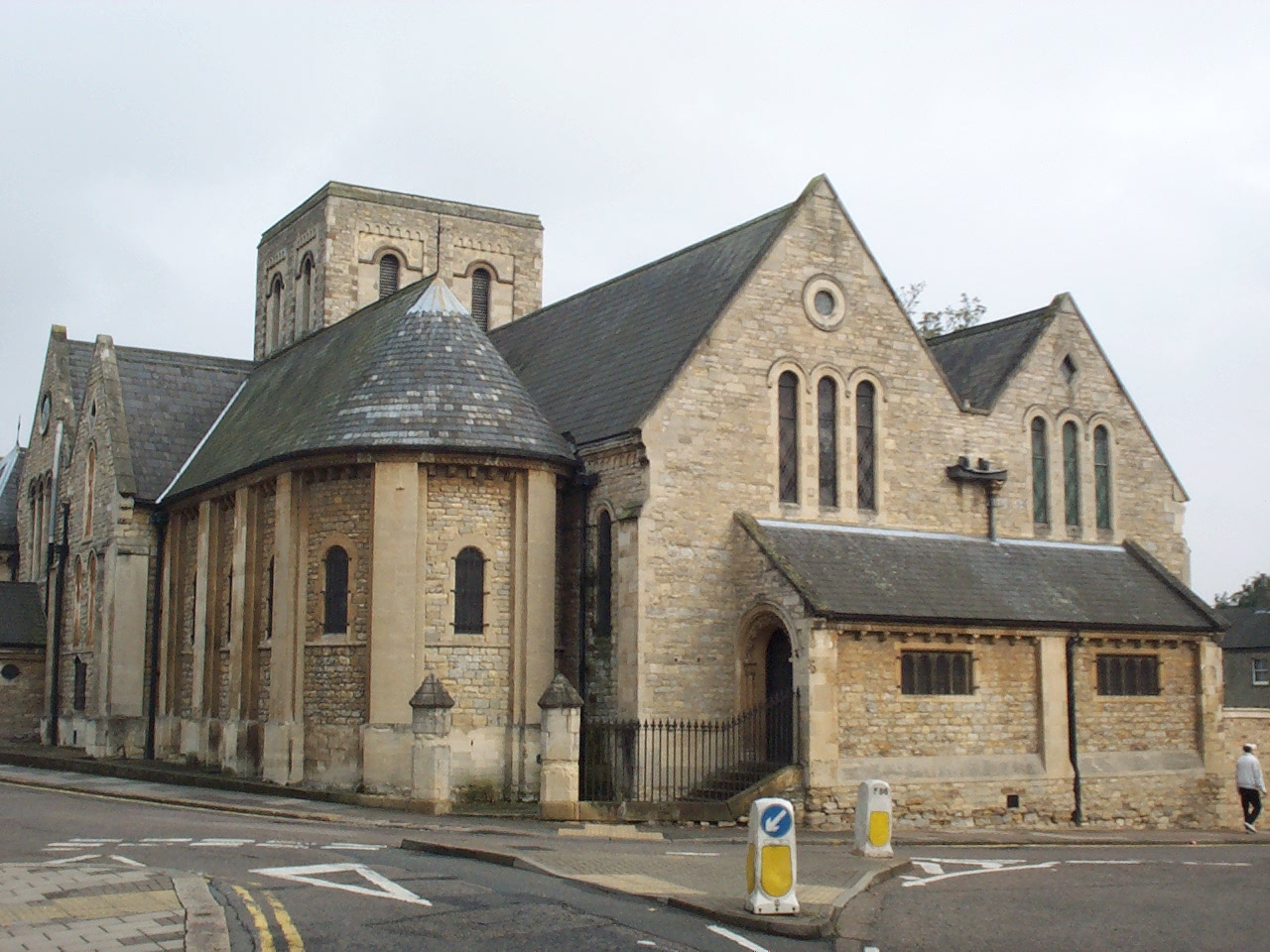
Penrose designed the north and south aisles added to St Cuhbert's Church, Bedford, in 1864–1865.

Penrose studied architecture under Edward Blore from 1835 to 1838, and studied abroad under the Cambridge designation of "travelling bachelor" from 1842 to 1845. In 1843 in Rome, Penrose noticed a problem with the pitch of the roof of pediment of the Pantheon – subsequent research confirmed that the angle had been changed from its original design.

Penrose studied classical monuments in Greece, taking and recording detailed measurements. He was one of the first to discover the entasis of the Parthenon and to show the deliberate curvature of the steps and entablature. The Society of Dilettanti became interested in his discoveries and sent him back to Greece to confirm them.

In 1848 Penrose was elected a Fellow of the Royal Institute of British Architects. He was appointed Surveyor of the Fabric of St Paul's Cathedral in 1852 and in this role did his main work.

Penrose's work on St Paul's included the choir seats and the marble pulpit and stairs. He designed the memorial to Lord Napier of Magdala and the Wellington tomb in the crypt, and arranged the relocation of the Wellington monument. He was also responsible for rearranging the West entrance steps and for exposing remains of the old cathedral in the churchyard. The new premises for the cathedral's choir school in Carter Lane were built to his designs in 1874. It was after a dispute with the Dean and Chapter that he turned to astronomy.

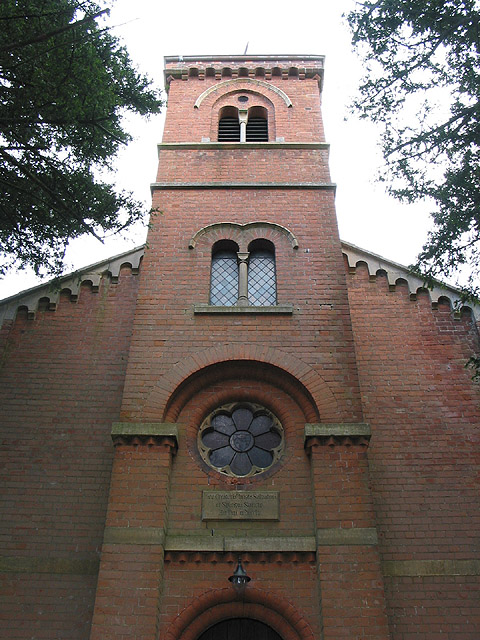
Penrose designed Holy Trinity parish church, Apperley, Gloucestershire, which was built in 1856. He also designed a west tower (shown here) and eastern apse that were added to the church in 1890.

There is some academic controversy over whether Penrose authored an April 1852 article on Athenian architecture, or whether the true author was Coventry Patmore.

Penrose was made a Fellow of Magdalene College in 1884. He designed the entrance gate of Magdalene College and the Chapel Court of St John's in Cambridge. From 1886 to 1887 and from 1890 to 1891 he was the first Director of the British School at Athens, which he had designed.

As President of the Royal Institute of British Architects from 1894 to 1896, Penrose was appointed architect and antiquary to the Royal Academy in 1898. He supplied the entry on Sir Christopher Wren to the Dictionary of National Biography.

== Personal life ==
Penrose was married in 1856 to Harriette Gibbes, daughter of Francis Gibbes, a surgeon of Harewood, Yorkshire. Emily Penrose, the second of five children and eldest of their four daughters, became Principal of Somerville College, Oxford, Royal Holloway College, London and Bedford College, London.

== Selected works ==
- Penrose, F.C., (communicated by Joseph Norman Lockyer), The Orientation of Greek Temples, Nature, v.48, n.1228, 11 May 1893, pp. 42–43
- An Investigation of the Principles of Athenian Architecture, or, The Results of a Recent Survey Conducted chiefly with Reference to the Optical Refinements Exhibited in the Construction of the Ancient Buildings at Athens, edited by the Society of Dilettanti, London 1851
  - 2nd edition: An investigation of the principles of Athenian architecture, or, the results of a survey conducted chiefly with reference to the optical refinements exhibited in the construction of the ancient buildings at Athens, London 1888 (document server of Heidelberg University)
- A work predicting eclipses

== See also ==
- List of Cambridge University Boat Race crews
