= Charles Penrose (rower) =

English rower, schoolteacher and clergyman

Charles Thomas Penrose (15 July 1816 – 5 May 1868) was an English rower, schoolteacher and clergyman.

Penrose was born at Bracebridge, Lincolnshire, the second son of Rev. John Penrose who was vicar there, and his wife Elizabeth Cartwright. His mother was a teacher and author of children's books under the name Mrs Markham. He was a nephew of Thomas Arnold of Rugby School and a cousin of Matthew Arnold, author and educator. He was educated at Rugby School and admitted to Trinity College, Cambridge, on 30 October 1834. He was Bell Scholar in 1839. Also in 1839, Penrose rowed for the winning Cambridge crew in the Boat Race and for the Trinity College crew which won the first Grand Challenge Cup at Henley Royal Regatta.

Penrose was ordained deacon at Lincoln in 1842 and became usher at Oakham School in 1844. He was then head master of Grosvenor College, Bath from 1844 until 1846 when he became headmaster of Sherborne School. However he resigned through ill health in 1850. Penrose became priest in 1856 and then perpetual curate of North Hykeham, Lincolnshire from 1857 until his death in 1868.

Penrose was a classical scholar and edited Select Private Orations of Demosthenes. He was also author of Eight Village Sermons.

Penrose died at North Hykeham at the age of 51.

Penrose married Ellen Caroline Pender Phillot at Dawlish in 1843. He was the brother of Francis Penrose.

== See also ==
- List of Cambridge University Boat Race crews
