= Skegby, Bassetlaw =

Hamlet in Nottinghamshire, England

Skegby
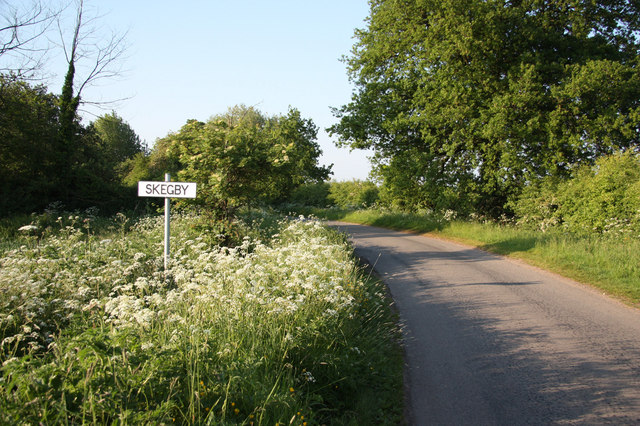
- Skegby Road sign

- Location within Nottinghamshire
- OS grid reference: SK 78598 69963
- Civil parish: Marnham
- District: Bassetlaw
- Shire county: Nottinghamshire
- Region: East Midlands
- Country: England
- Sovereign state: United Kingdom
- Post town: Newark-on-Trent
- Postcode district: NG23
- Police: Nottinghamshire
- Fire: Nottinghamshire
- Ambulance: East Midlands
- UK Parliament: Newark
- List of places UK England Nottinghamshire 53.222°N 0.824°W

Skegby is a hamlet within the Marnham civil parish in Bassetlaw district, of the county of Nottinghamshire, England. It lies in the north east of the county, south east within the district and centre south of the parish. It is 122 miles (196 km) north of London, 23 miles (37 km) north east of the city of Nottingham, and 17 miles (27 km) north east of the market town of Mansfield. There are two listed buildings in the area.

== Toponymy ==
The name "Skegby" has of Norse origins, the by(r) or dwelling of Skeggir, who is translated as "the bearded one." Skegby was recorded in the Domesday Book as Scachebi.

== Geography ==
=== Location ===
Skegby is surrounded by the following local areas:

- Darlton to the north
- Normanton-on-Trent to the south
- Low Marnham and High Marnham to the east
- Tuxford to the west.

=== Settlement ===
This is a small hamlet centrally located within the centre south of the parish, based around Skegby Road. It is 1 1/5 miles (2 km) west of the Marnham villages, and the smallest settlement of the three areas. It is reached from the Marnham villages, without exiting the parish, by means of Polly Taylor's Road. It has 3 farms and 3 cottages. A notable residence in the area is Skegby Manor which is a listed building.

The land elevation at Skegby is around 20 metres (66 ft).

== Governance and demography ==
The three settlements Low Marnham, High Marnham and Skegby are combined as Marnham parish for administrative identity.

It is managed at the first level of public administration by Marnham with Normanton-on-Trent Parish Council.

At district level, the wider area is managed by Bassetlaw District Council.

Nottinghamshire County Council provides the highest level strategic services locally.

== History ==
=== Medieval history ===
Roger de Busli at the time of the Domesday (1086) was the key landowner of the Marnham manor as well as beyond. From this, William de Kewles became lord of these manors, and from this they passed to the Chaworths. Elizabeth, the daughter and heiress of Sir George Chaworth, carried the holdings through marriage to Sir William Cope. By 1853 Earl Brownlow was the principal owner and lord of the manor of Marnham.

=== Later history ===
Skegby Manor was a 285-acre (115 ha) farm. It was held by Charles Francis Wade in the mid-1800s. Their son Richard Wade became a partner in the Sharpe & Wade solicitor firm based in Market Deeping for many years, and run by several generations of the Wade family. He was also Lord of the manor in Skegby in 1927.

In 1835, White's Directory reported three farm houses and three cottages in Skegby.

== Landmarks ==
=== Listed buildings ===
There is only one listed residence in the area, Skegby Manor. It is listed at Grade II, and dates from the 18th century. Its pigeoncote auxiliary building is also listed.
