= Marnham, Nottinghamshire =

Civil parish in Nottinghamshire, England

Coordinates: 53.220°N 0.805°W

Marnham
- Civil parish
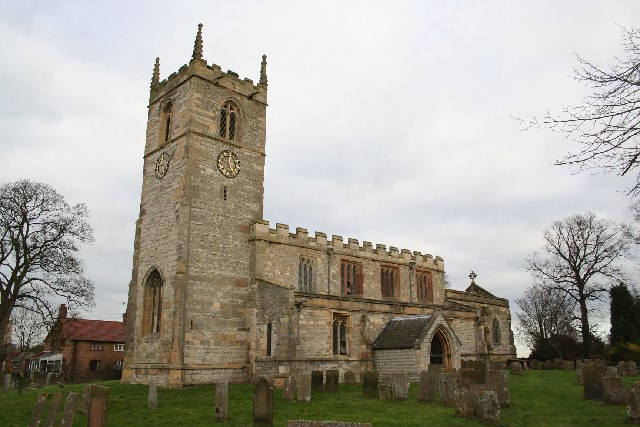
- St Wilfrid's Church, Low Marnham

- Location within Nottinghamshire
- Interactive map of Marnham
- Area: 3.82 sq mi (9.9 km^{2})
- Population: 136 (2021)
  - Density: 36/sq mi (14/km^{2})
- OS grid reference: SK 797699
  - London: 120 mi (190 km) SE
- District: Bassetlaw
- Shire county: Nottinghamshire
- Region: East Midlands
- Country: England
- Sovereign state: United Kingdom
- Settlements: Low Marnham, High Marnham and Skegby
- Post town: NEWARK
- Postcode district: NG23
- Dialling code: 01636
- Police: Nottinghamshire
- Fire: Nottinghamshire
- Ambulance: East Midlands
- UK Parliament: Newark
- Website: normantonontrent parishcouncil.gov.uk

Map

Marnham is a civil parish in the Bassetlaw district, in the county of Nottinghamshire, England. The parish includes the village of Low Marnham and the hamlets of High Marnham and Skegby. In the census of 2021 the parish had a population of 136. The parish lies in the north east of the county, and south east within the district. It is 122 miles north of London, 23 miles north east of the city of Nottingham, and 17 miles north east of the market town of Mansfield. The parish touches Fledborough, Normanton on Trent, South Clifton, Tuxford and Weston. Marnham shares a parish council with Normanton on Trent. There are 7 listed buildings in Marnham.

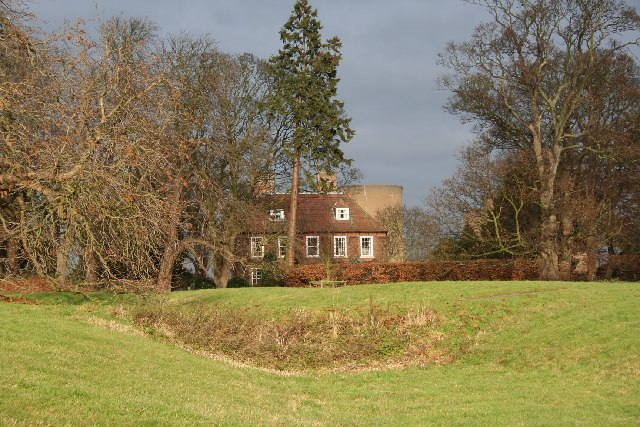
Marnham Hall

== Geography ==
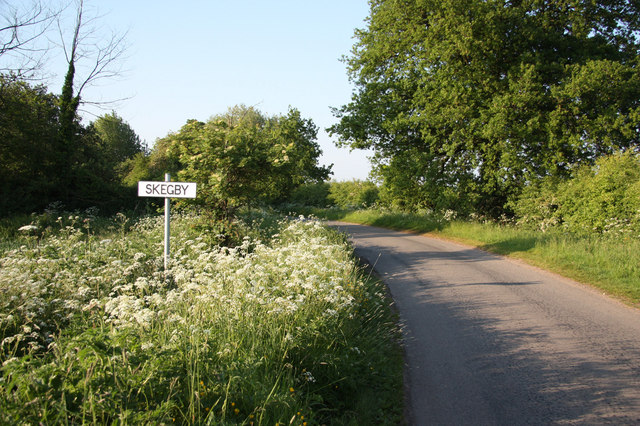
Location sign at Skegby

=== Location ===
It is surrounded by the following local areas:

- Darlton and Fledborough to the north
- Normanton-on-Trent to the south
- South Clifton to the east
- Tuxford to the west.

The parish is approximately 4 miles in width, by 2 miles.

=== Settlements ===
The parish consists of:

- Low Marnham
- High Marnham
- Skegby

==== Low Marnham ====
This lies in the southeast corner of the parish, along a lane that spurs off a key road from Rampton to Sutton-on-Trent running north to south, near the River Trent. Low Marnham traditionally had the higher profile in the past because of its now dormant parish church and school/village hall. Very few public facilities exist.

==== High Marnham ====
This is approximately of equal size to, and is further along the lane into Low Marnham. The lane runs nearby the River Trent before looping back to the Sutton-Rampton road. It is located 1/2 mile (750 m) north of Low Marnham and separated by greenfield land. High Marnham presently maintains more amenities such as a public house, caravan site and park homes, but became prominent with the presence of the former ferry to South Clifton across the River Trent, and particularly with High Marnham power station being sited close to the village.

==== Skegby ====
This is a small hamlet centrally located within the centre south of the parish. It is 1 1/5 miles (2 km) west of the Marnham villages, and the smallest settlement of the three areas. It is reached from the Marnham villages, without exiting the parish, by means of Polly Taylor's Road. It maintains very few houses with a number of farms in the surrounding area. A notable residence in the area is Skegby Manor which is a listed building.

=== Landscape ===
Predominantly, many of the parish residents are clustered around the three villages. Outside of this is a light scattering of farms, farmhouses, auxiliary buildings and cottages amongst a wider mainly farmland setting. There are open fields to the west and north, and river floodplain areas (Ferry Holme, Marnham Holme, Marnham Meadow) to the east alongside the river.

==== Water features ====
The River Trent forms the east boundary of the parish, High Marnham is around 2/5 mile (500 m) inland, with Low Marnham further away, at 2/3 mile (1 km).

The Trent until the 19th century occasionally changed its course and one of these is called Old Trent, it brought the river much closer to the villages. Old Trent remains presently as a small stream.

There is a fishing lake at a caravan site along the unnamed road between the Marnham villages.

==== Land elevation ====
Along the bank of the Trent is very low-lying, at approximately 5 metres (16 ft). The Marnham villages are a little higher than this being inland, with Low Marnham at less than 10 metres (33 ft) and High Marnham at 10–15 metres (33–49 ft). A 21 m (69 feet) shallow ridge by Polly Taylor's Road is known locally as Polly Taylor's Hill. Further inland still at Skegby it rises to 20 metres (66 ft). At Ruddingwood Farm by the western extremity of the parish, it peaks at 40 metres (130 ft).

== Governance and demography ==
The three settlements are Low Marnham, High Marnham and Skegby.

These are combined as Marnham parish for administrative identity.

This parish reports a population of 136 from the 2021 census, an increase from 117 residents of 2011.

It shares a council with Normanton-on-Trent, being managed at the first level of public administration by Normanton on Trent with Marnham Parish Council.

At district level, the wider area is managed by Bassetlaw District Council.

Nottinghamshire County Council provides the highest level strategic services locally.

== History ==
=== Toponymy ===
The name "Marnham" means 'Mearna's homestead/village' who was an Anglo Saxon local, although little knowledge on this owner exists.

=== Medieval history ===
Roger de Busli at the time of the Domesday Book (1086) was the key landowner of the Marnham manor as well as beyond. From this, William de Kewles became lord of these manors, and from this they passed to the Chaworths. Elizabeth, the daughter and heiress of Sir George Chaworth, carried the holdings through marriage to Sir William Cope. By 1853 Earl Brownlow was the principal owner and Lord of the Manor of Marnham.

=== Church of England protestants ===
Low Marnham has a notable connection to the early 17th century Protestant movement and the ‘Mayflower Trail’ which usually tracks the development of Puritanism from Babworth to Scrooby and Austerfield. The ‘Mayflower’ route particularly begins here, because it is where the spiritual leader of the Scrooby separatists, Richard Clyfton started in his first capacity as vicar briefly in 1586, before taking up the post at Babworth only a few months after. It is also where John Smyth, the first Baptist, was involved in a riot, possibly to help gain control of the chapel from Puritans, and taken to court in 1604.

=== Marnham Hall ===
Marnham Hall comprised a large manor house, Grade II listed, set within large grounds and located close to the River Trent at High Marnham. The oldest part of the hall dates to the 16th century, with remodelling and re-facing in the early 18th century. it was the home of the Cartwright family who had 'made good' through a family connection to Thomas Cranmer. For 250 years they were the dominant family here and their memorials carpet the sanctuary floor in the Low Marnham church.

They are most famous for the 'golden generation' born in the mid-1700s where three brothers became quite notable. There was the explorer 'Labrador' George Cartwright who brought a small group of Inuit to stay at Marnham although most died of smallpox soon after. He and his brother John Cartwright or 'Jack' explored in Newfoundland alongside George and have a town (Cartwright) bearing their name - and a memorial. George ran out of money and the Hall had to be bought back from the mortgage by the younger brother John. He further tried to help out his brother Edmund, a clergyman who invented the power loom in 1784 but who then got into difficulties trying to run a textiles business. The 'Revolution Mill' they set up in Retford was not a success. Edmund lived in Low Marnham until the end of the 18th century, and later built Ossington Hall.

Edmund was also the father of the famous 'Mrs Markham', children's writer Elizabeth Penrose. He created other inventions such as the wool-combing machine, and was also vicar of Marnham in the 1770s. Jack sold Marnham to the Brownlows and moved to Lincolnshire, after which there was refurbishment involving part of the hall being demolished and rebuilt around 1789–1793. The Brownlows seat was Belton House in Lincolnshire, and so Marnham was let to tenant farmers. The estate remained in the Brownlow/Cust family until the death of the 3rd Earl in 1921, although there were sales of portions of the Marnham area from 1920.

=== Later history ===
Earl Brownlow built a schoolhouse opposite the church at Low Marnham in 1823. This was latterly used as a church, before becoming a village hall.

Skegby Manor was a 285-acre farm. It was held by Charles Francis Wade in the mid-1800s. Their son Richard Wade became a partner in the Sharpe & Wade solicitor firm based in Market Deeping for many years, and run by several generations of the Wade family. He was also Lord of the Manor in Skegby in 1927, with the manor let out to tenant farmers.

In 1835, White's Directory reported 3 farm houses and three cottages in Skegby.

Until 1866, Grassthorpe was a township within Marnham parish.

By the late 19th century the Marnham villages carried alternative names - Ferry or Upper (High) Marnham, and Church or Lower (Low) Marnham

The ferry service, in place for many centuries between Marnham and South Clifton was in use until the early 20th century.

Part of Marnham parish was transferred to South Clifton on 25 March 1885 and on 1 April 1935. 137 acres was transferred from Normanton on Trent to Marnham, the transferred area had a population of 2 in 1931.

=== High Marnham power station ===
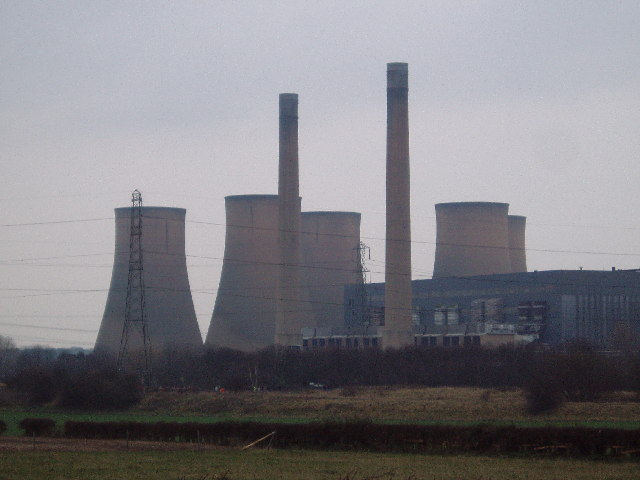
High Marnham power station in 2003

This former power station was located 1/2 mile (750 m) north of High Marnham. The plant was commissioned in 1958, officially opened in October 1962, and closed in 2003 after 45 years of operation. An electrical substation remains in operation on site.

== Economy ==
Primarily, agriculture is the core usage of the local land within the parish.

JG Pears is an animal feed, fertiliser manufacturing facility and CHP power plant, located to the south of Low Marnham.

There are three caravan and park home sites, mainly sited around High Marnham.

== Community & leisure ==
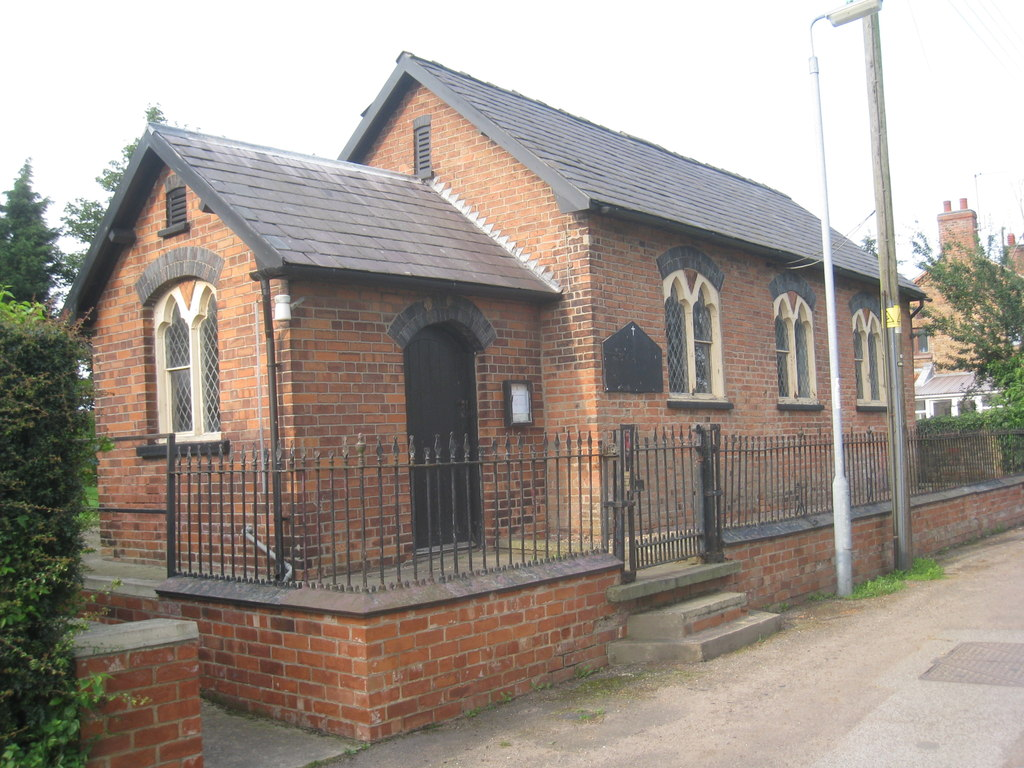
The Church Room/Village Hall, Low Marnham

A village hall/church room is at Low Marnham.

There is one public house, The Brownlow Arms, in High Marnham.

Caravan parks and park homes are also located in and around High Marnham.

National Cycle route 647 runs along the north of the parish.

A boat club is run from the river at High Marnham.

== Landmarks ==
=== Listed buildings ===
There are 7 listed buildings, including:

- St Wilfrid's Church at Low Marnham, Grade I
- Marnham Hall at High Marnham, Grade II, portions of which date from the 16th century, but substantially from the 18th century.
- Village hall at Low Marnham, Grade II. This was first a school before becoming a parish church.
- Skegby Manor, Grade II, dates from the 18th century, possibly as early as 1720.

== Transport ==
The Lancashire, Derbyshire and East Coast Railway, and later LNER railway line ran through the heart of the parish, before exiting by Fledborough station which was along the north border at Fledborough Road. Fledborough was opened in 1897 and closed in 1955. The line continued to be used for through traffic until 1980, when the route over the River Trent/Fledborough viaduct was permanently closed off after a derailment. Coal traffic continued to Marnham until 2003 when the High Marnham power station was decommissioned.

The line west of the power station was reopened in 2009 as the High Marnham test track.

The trackbed east of the railway station location, which runs over the Fledborough viaduct as National Cycle route 647, is joined within Marnham parish.

== Religious sites ==
St Wilfrid's Church at Low Marnham dates from the 13th century, and was closed as a site of worship in 1986. Inside the church is a World War I memorial and a decorative entry door.

== Notable people ==
- George Cartwright (1739–1819), explorer
- John Cartwright (1740–1824), political reformer and naval officer
- Edmund Cartwright (1743–1823), inventor and clergyman
