= St Mary-at-Finchley Church =

Coordinates: 51.5996°N 0.1975°W

St Mary-at-Finchley
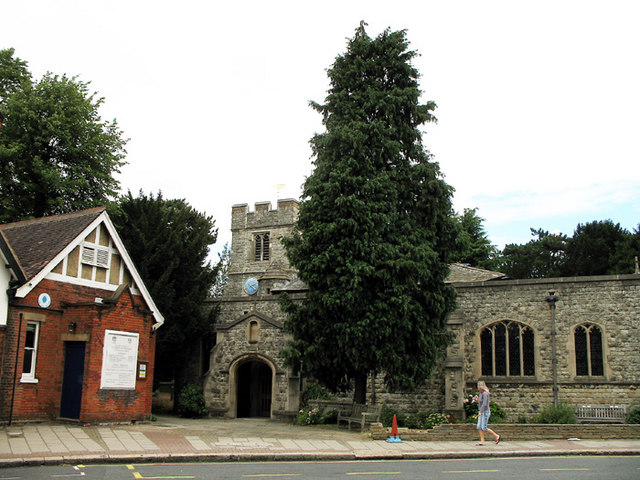
- St Mary-at-Finchley
- St Mary-at-Finchley
- Country: England
- Denomination: Church of England
- Website: stmaryatfinchley.org.uk

Architecture
- Heritage designation: Grade II*
- Style: English Gothic

Administration
- Province: Canterbury
- Diocese: London
- Archdeaconry: Hampstead
- Deanery: Barnet
- Parish: Finchley

Clergy
- Rector: Philip Davison

St Mary-at-Finchley Church is the Church of England parish church for Finchley. It is located in Hendon Lane, in the town centre, near Finchley Library.

== History ==
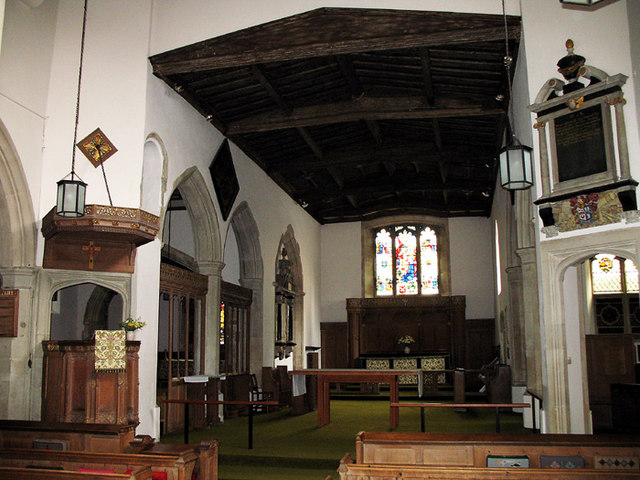
Interior of St Mary-at-Finchley

The church was established sometime in the 12th century. There is reference to a church here in 1274, and evidence of a building even before then. By 1356, it was dedicated to St Mary. The building has been altered many times since its foundation and the oldest parts, the north wall and the tower (which seems to have had a steeple during the 16th and 17th centuries), date from the reign of King Henry VII.

There is an ambry, now in the north wall, and a font bowl, rescued in the 19th century from the rectory grounds, having been buried there during the English Civil War. They are both Norman.

In 1872, the church was enlarged. In 1878, Henry Willis & Sons provided the church with its current organ.

Bombing during the London Blitz of 1940 led to the substantial rebuilding of the church in 1953. The east end was largely destroyed and the stained glass had to be replaced. Caroe and Partners provided a new altar, reredos, parclose screen and pulpit. The organ was in a poor state after the bombing and moved to the west end. Major restoration work to the organ was completed in 2011.

The church has been a grade II* listed building since 1949.

To commemorate the current millennium, in 2000 a special wall hanging was made which now hangs in the church. It depicts all the various groups involved in the life of St Mary-at-Finchley at the end of the twentieth century. There is a key to the symbols on the wall beside the hanging.

== Monuments and burials ==
The oldest monument is a brass plate to Richard Prate (d. 1487), and there is a marble effigy of Alexander King (d. 1618) and his wife. Another brass, of Thomas Sanny, dated 1509, unusually reproduces part of his will. Other notable monuments include those of the Allen family, owners of Finchley's Manor House.

In the churchyard are the graves of Thomas Payne, the radical and bookseller, and Major John Cartwright, the political reformer.

== Church rectors ==
- 1527–1533† Walter Preston
- 1535–1554 John Spendlove (deprived)
- 1558–1581† John Spendlove (restored)
- 1581–1599 William Cotton (as Archdeacon of Lewes)
- 1599–1601† Richard Latewar
- 1601–1608 John Bancroft
- 1608–1615 John Barkham
- 1622–1626 Francis Wright
- 1626–1639† Thomas Worrall
- 1657–1662 Thomas Goldstone (ejected 1662)
- 1666–1707† John Hall
- 1707–1730† Nathaniel Marshall
- 1731–1743† William Crowe
- 1743–1767† Thomas Archer
- 1767–1770 James Waller
- 1770–1794† Samuel Carr
- 1794–1848† Ralph Worsley
- 1848–1877† Thomas Reader White
- 1900–1924 William St Hill Bourne
- 1924–1941 Stewart Bernays
- 2008– Philip Davison

† Rector died in post

== See also ==
- History of Church End, Barnet
