= Statue of John Cartwright =

Statue in Bloomsbury, London

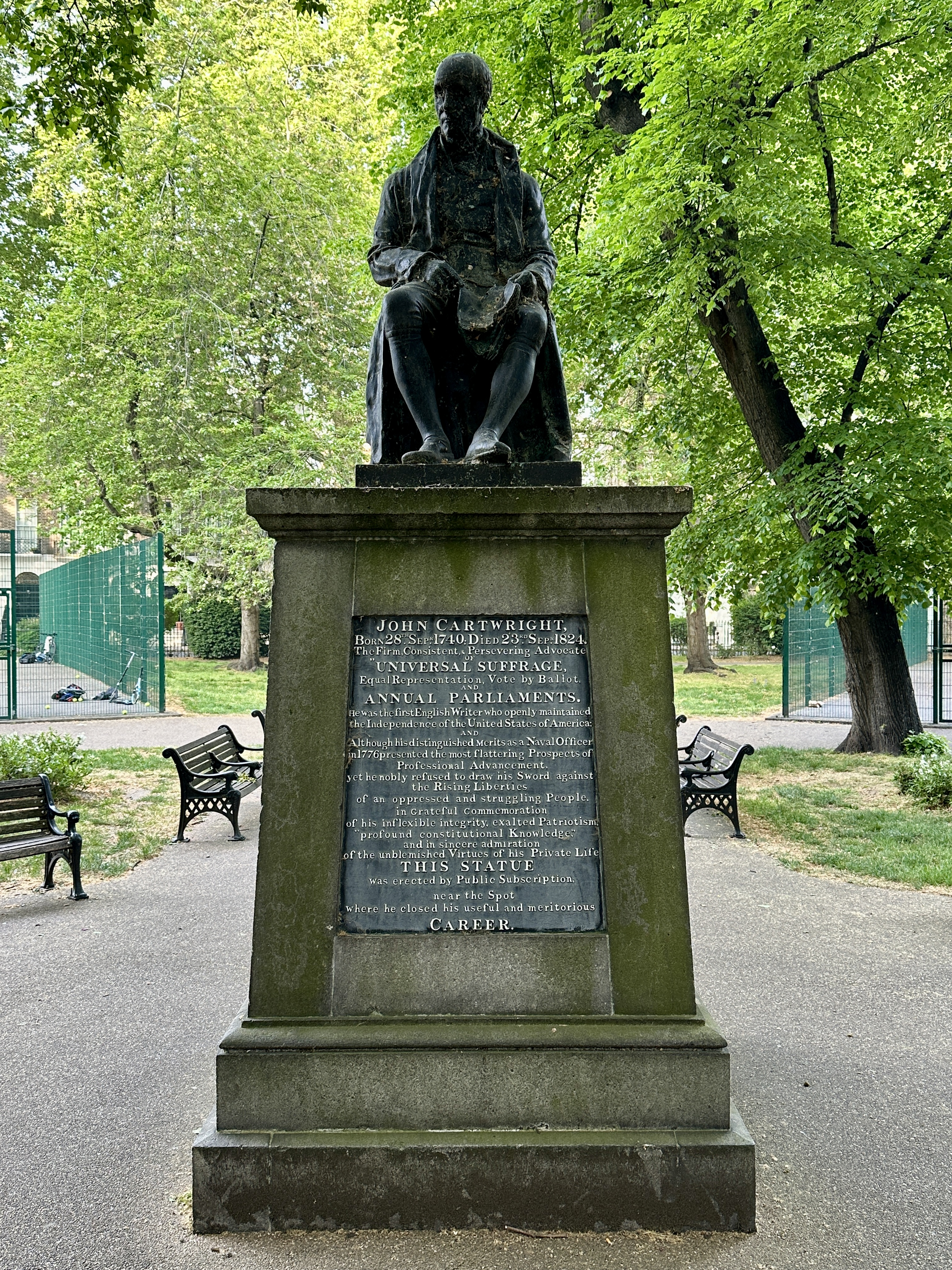
- The statue of John Cartwright in 2026
- Artist: George Clarke
- Year: 1831; 195 years ago
- Medium: Bronze
- Subject: John Cartwright
- Location: London, WC1H United Kingdom; 51°31′37″N 0°07′36″W

Listed Building – Grade II
- Official name: Statue of John Cartwright
- Designated: 14 May 1974
- Reference no.: 1244104

The Statue of John Cartwright is a bronze statue created in 1831 of political reformer John Cartwright. Cartwright is considered the "Father of Reform" for his work on implementing universal suffrage, annual parliamentary sessions, voting by mail, and equal representation from constituencies. He served in the Royal Navy until the outbreak of the American Revolutionary War due to his support for self-determination of the Thirteen Colonies. For decades Cartwright sought changes in Parliament and also advocated for the abolition of slavery. Several years after his death, the statue by George Clarke was installed, near Cartwright's former residence on Burton Crescent (later renamed Cartwright Gardens in his honour), London. The statue was listed in 1974.

== Description ==
The statue of John Cartwright depicts him seated, wearing contemporary clothing including knee breeches, and holding papers while conversing. The statue and plaques are bronze, and the pedestal is made of granite. It is located in Cartwright Gardens, a crescent-shaped park and street in Bloomsbury, London. The statue sits near Cartwright's former residence on Burton Crescent, later renamed Cartwright Gardens. The house is part of a terraced row listed in 1974.

The inscription on the statue's plaque reads:

JOHN CARTWRIGHT
Born 28th. Sep. 1740; Died 23rd. Sep. 1824.
The Firm, Consistent, & Persevering Advocate
OF
UNIVERSAL SUFFRAGE,
Equal Representation, Vote by Ballot,
AND
ANNUAL PARLIAMENTS.
He was the first English Writer who openly maintained
the Independence of the United States of America;
AND
Although his distinguished merits as a Naval Officer
in 1776 presented the most flattering Prospects of
Professional Advancement,
yet he nobly refused to draw his Sword against
the Rising Liberties
of an oppressed and struggling People.
In grateful commemoration
of his inflexible integrity, exalted Patriotism, "profound constitutional Knowledge"
and in sincere admiration
of the unblemished Virtues of his Private Life
THIS STATUE
was erected by Public Subscription,
near the Spot
where he closed his useful and meritorious
CAREER.

== Background ==
=== Cartwright ===
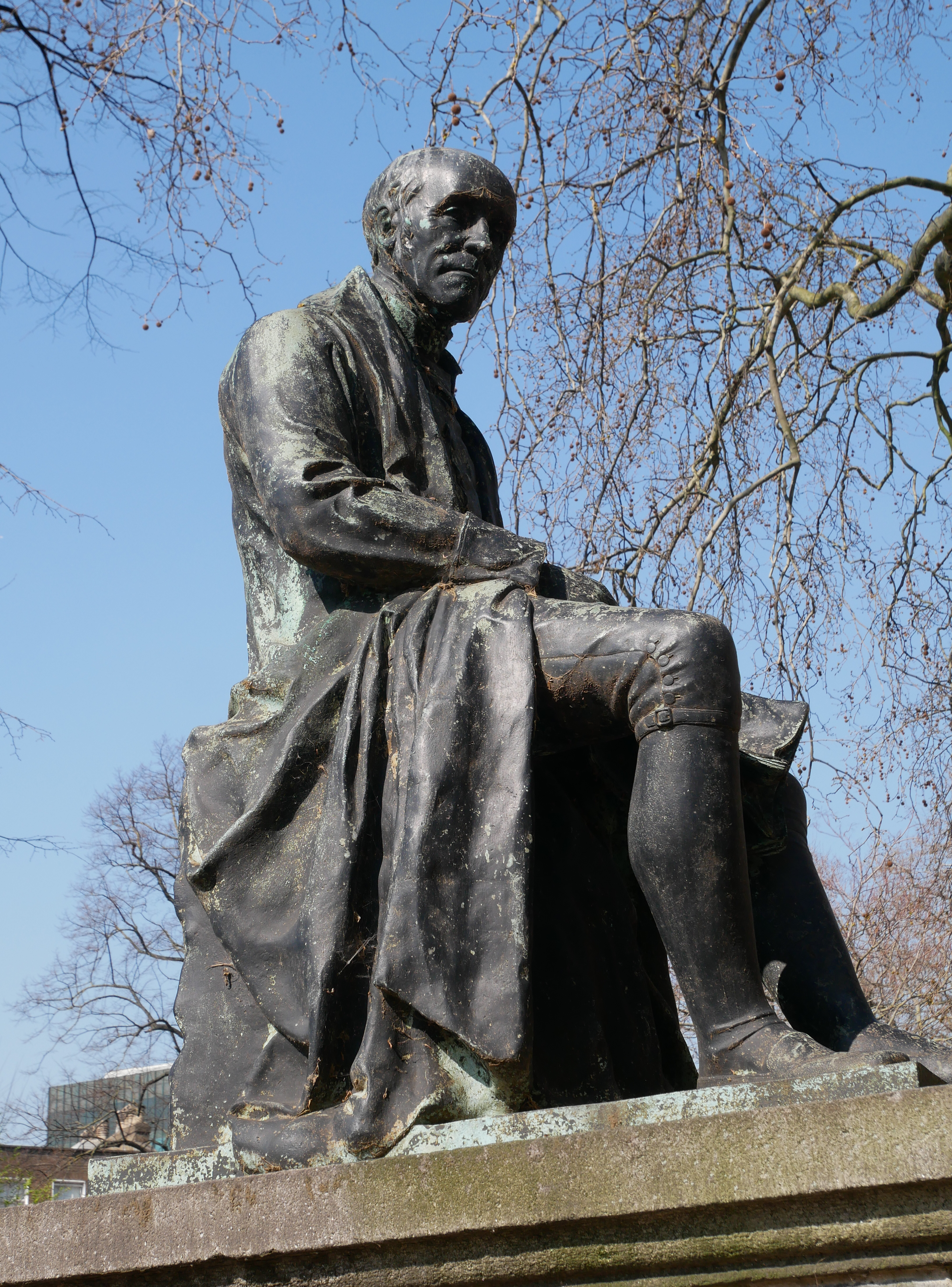
Closeup of the statue

John Cartwright was born in 1740. He joined the Royal Navy at age eighteen and participated in the 1758 Cherbourg raid and 1759 Battle of Quiberon Bay during the Seven Years' War. Following the war, he was commander of the HMS Sherborne from 1763 to 1766 and served as chief magistrate of the Newfoundland Station from 1765-1770. During the lead up to the American Revolutionary War, Cartwright sympathised with the colonists' view, feeling they had a right to self-determination. In 1774, he published American Independence the Glory and Interest of Great Britain, arguing on the colonists' behalf, becoming the first writer from Great Britain to openly support their cause.

After war broke out between the Thirteen Colonies and the Kingdom of Great Britain, in 1776 Cartwright wrote self-governing colonies such as the one in America should be kept only if they are bound by "the ties of blood and mutual interests, by sincere love and friendship, which abhors dependence, and by every other cementing principle which hath power to take hold of the human heart." When asked to participate in fighting against the American colonies, Cartwright said he could not because it was an unjust war, thus ending his naval career.

That same year Cartwright began his efforts to reform Parliament by writing Take your Choice, with a second edition titled The Legislative Rights of the Commonalty Vindicated. It was one of the first publications calling for reforms in Parliament, with his chief demands of universal suffrage, annual parliamentary sessions, voting by mail, and equal representation from constituencies. A few years later he formed the Society for Constitutional Information, an association whose aim was to promote parliamentary reforms. He supported fellow reformists during the 1794 Treason Trials and ran unsuccessfully for Parliament on three occasions between 1780 and 1807.

In 1819, Cartwright was arrested for speaking at a reformist gathering and indicted for conspiracy. At his trial the following year, at the age of 80, he was found guilty and ordered to pay £100. According to Lord Edward Gleichen, Cartwright's "enthusiasm and an entirely disinterested zeal for democracy kept the spirit of youth in [him], and carried him at the age of 80 over a trial for sedition undisturbed. His zeal was not to be quenched." In addition to his calls for parliamentary reform, Cartwright also supported effort to abolish slavery.

The row of terraced houses where Cartwright lived, as well as the park in front of them, were originally known as Burton Crescent, named after property developer James Burton. The houses were built between 1809 and 1811 and Cartwright lived in number 37. The statue of Cartwright in the park was installed on 20 July 1831. The street and park were later renamed in his honour. The statue was listed on 14 May 1974.

=== Sculptor ===
George Clarke was born in Birmingham where he began work as a sculptor. He later moved to London and in 1821, his first work was exhibited, a bust of Samuel Parr at the Royal Academy of Arts. During the next eighteen years, his busts included those of Arthur Wellesley, 1st Duke of Wellington, William Macready, Sir Charles Cockerell, Raja Ram Mohan Roy, and Thomas Perronet Thompson. Clarke's statue of Cartwright is considered his finest work. While performing work on Nelson's Column in Trafalgar Square, Clarke became ill and returned to Birmingham where he died. According to Leslie Stephen, Clarke "showed great promise as an artist, and would probably have risen to some eminence in his profession."

== See also ==
- List of public art in the London Borough of Camden
