= Cartwright Sound =

Coordinates: 53°12′00″N 132°40′00″W

Cartwright Sound is a sound on the southwest coast of Graham Island in the Queen Charlotte Islands of the North Coast of British Columbia, Canada. It was named by Captain George Vancouver in honour of John Cartwright, then serving in the Royal Navy under Admiral Howe and later a noted political and social reformer in Britain. The sound is located in the area of Kano Inlet, and lies between Tcenakum and Hunter Points. In the center is a tiny island called Marble Island. Listed by the BC Geographical Names Information System, the sound is entirely missing from Google Maps. Adding to the confusion, Cartwright Sound Charters, which runs fishing expeditions to the sound, is based in Sandspit, British Columbia, on the far east coast of Graham island Queen Charlotte Islands is also now known as the Haida Gwaii archipelago
