= The English Constitution Produced and Illustrated =

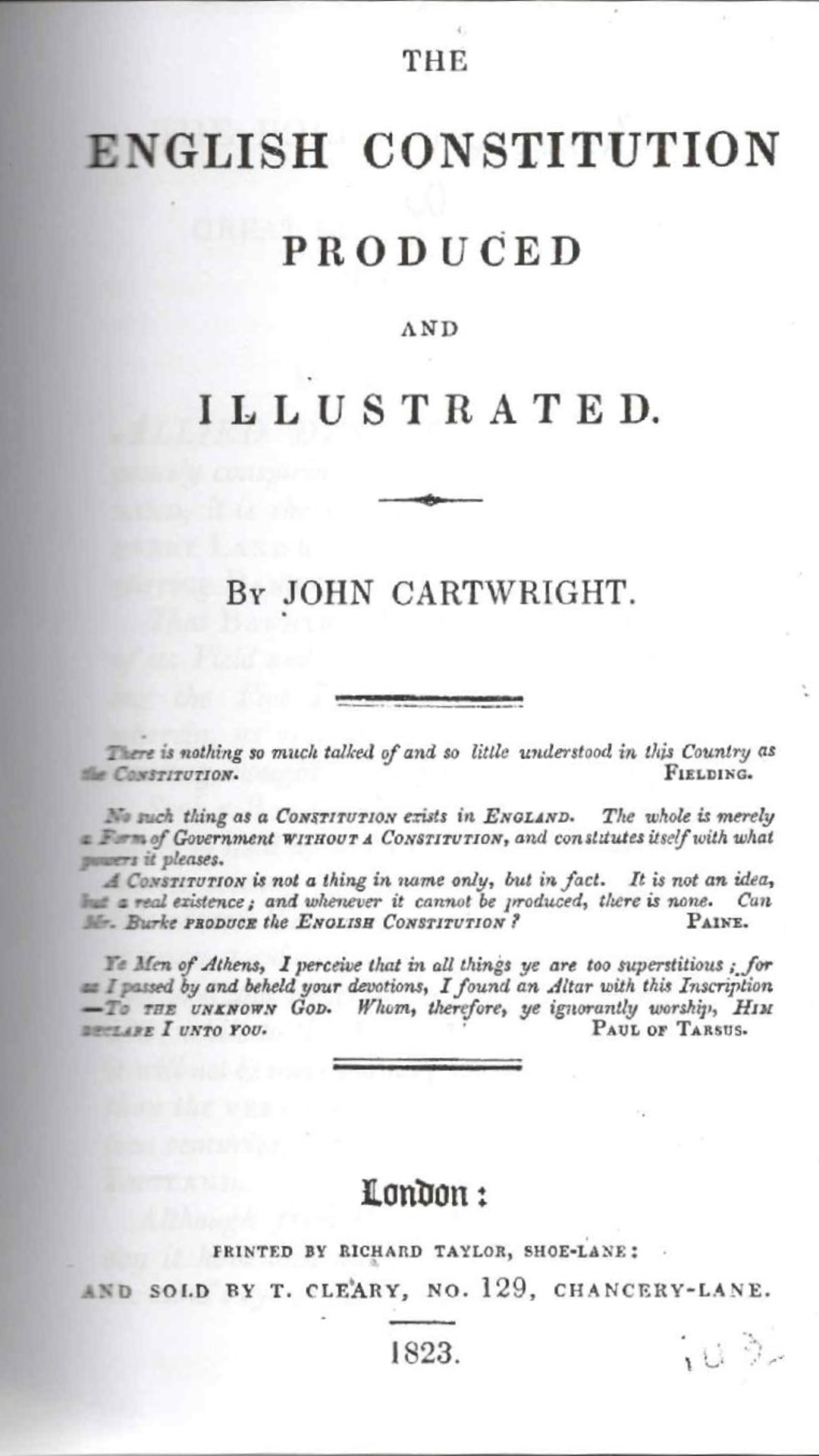

The English Constitution Produced and Illustrated is an 1823 book by English Radical John Cartwright, explaining the unwritten constitution of England and Anglo-Saxon law.

The book was written in response to Thomas Paine, who, in Rights of Man, expressed scepticism of the existence of an English constitution.

== Reception ==
Cartwright sent a copy of The English Constitution to Thomas Jefferson. Jefferson wrote to Cartwright in July 1824:

Your age of eighty-four, and mine of eighty-one years, ensure us a speedy meeting. We may then commune at leisure, and more fully, on the good and evil, which in the course of our long lives, we have both witnessed; and in the mean time, I pray you to accept assurances of my high veneration and esteem for your person and character.

== See also ==
- Society for Constitutional Information
