= George Clarke (artist) =

English sculptor

- Born: 1796
- Died: 12 March 1842 (aged 45–46)
- Occupation: Sculptor

George Clarke (1796 – 12 March 1842) was an English sculptor.

== Biography ==
Clarke was a native of Birmingham, where he enjoyed a large practice as a sculptor and modeller. In 1821 he exhibited for the first time at the Royal Academy, sending a bust of Samuel Parr. He continued to exhibit at intervals up to 1839, among the busts sent by him being those of Macready, Rev. Dr. Maltby, Sir Charles Cockerell, Raminohun Roy, the Earl of Guilford, John Spottiswoode, Lady Burrell, Colonel Thompson, M.P. for Hull, and others. For a considerable portion of this period he resided in London. He modelled a colossal bust of the Duke of Wellington, and executed the statue of Major John Cartwright, LL.P., the champion of radical reform, which was set up in 1831 in Burton Crescent, in front of the house in which Cartwright died, and is generally considered to be his best work. Clarke, who had earned the name of the "Birmingham Chantrey," was engaged by the committee to cast the foliage on the capital of the Nelson column in Trafalgar Square. He had succeeded in completing two of the leaves, a very arduous task, when, on 12 March 1842, he was seized with sudden illness, while in a shop at Birmingham, whither he had returned, and died in a very short time, aged 46, leaving a large family totally unprovided for. He showed great promise as an artist, and would probably have risen to some eminence in his profession.
