= George Cartwright (trader) =

English army officer and trader (c. 1739–1819)

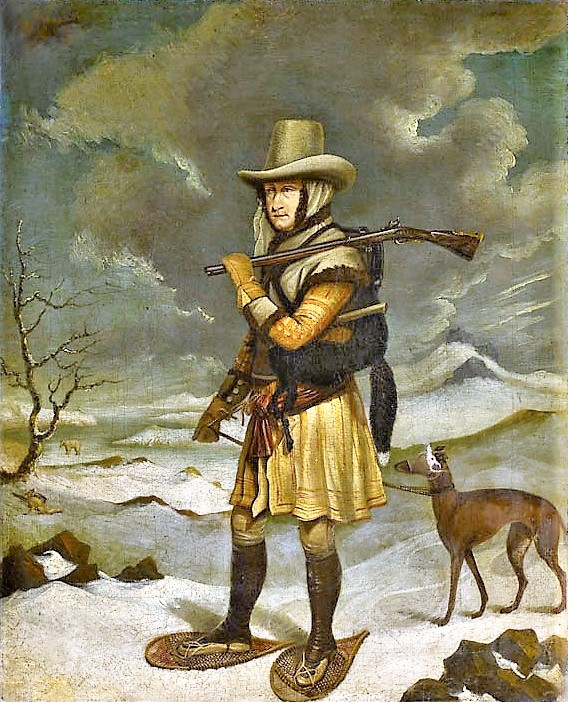
George Cartwright by William Hilton the Elder (circa 1791)

George Cartwright (12 February 1739/40 – 19 May 1819) was an English army officer and a trader and explorer in Newfoundland Colony. His name is borne by Cartwright, a settlement at the entrance to Sandwich Bay.

== Early life and family ==
George Cartwright was born at Marnham in Nottinghamshire. He was the second son of William Cartwright and his wife Anne (née Cartwright) of Marnham Hall. He was an elder brother of Edmund Cartwright, clergyman and inventor of the power loom, and of John Cartwright, naval officer and English parliamentary reformer.

== Army career ==
Cartwright became a gentleman cadet in the Royal Military Academy at Woolwich, London, when he was fifteen. He served in India as ensign in the 39th Foot. In 1759, he was promoted lieutenant while in Ireland. In 1760 he was aide-de-camp to the Marquess of Granby in Germany and a staff officer under Duke Ferdinand of Brunswick. He was brevetted captain in 1762, returned to England and went on half pay from 1762 to 1766. In 1766, Cartwright was commissioned Captain in the 37th Foot, and went to Minorca during 1766 and 1767.

== Voyages to Newfoundland and Labrador ==
George Cartwright's brother John Cartwright was first lieutenant on HMS Guernsey. In the 1766 season, George Cartwright cruised the Newfoundland coast on this vessel with his brother.

In 1768, George Cartwright went to Newfoundland again and accompanied John Cartwright's voyage attempting to contact the Beothuk people on the Exploits River.

Between 1770 and 1786, Cartwright occupied a number of fishing and furring stations from Cape St Charles to Sandwich Bay and developed connections with the Inuit and Innu people there. His financial successes was mixed at best, and his many setbacks included being thoroughly raided by American privateers in 1778. This came about when his servant Dominick Kinnien defected to join the crew of the Bostonian John Grimes.

In 1772, Cartwright brought five Inuit individuals from what was then called Labrador. However, it is ambiguous to whether or not this was done forcefully or in collaboration with the chosen individuals. Travelling on this ship to England was Atajug, his youngest wife Ikkanguaq and their toddler daughter Ikiunaq. Joining Atajug's family was Atajug's younger brother Tuglavingaaq and his wife Qavvik, also known as Caubvick. They travelled with Cartwright to Ireland and England, where they were a sensation, drawing the attention of King George III, Joseph Banks, John Hunter, James Boswell, Samuel Johnson, and great crowds. Similar to other Indigenous travellers to London in the past, this Inuit family was "subjected to the spectacle of Georgian London". The intention was both to show off the Imperial city and to show off them, the Inuit family, to the curious and consumer eyes of London society.

In May 1773, Cartwright and Atajug's family started the journey home. However, before they had even left the Thames, Qavvik fell ill with smallpox. Three weeks later Atajuq, Ikkanguaq, Ikiunaq and Tuglavingaaq had all died. Qavvik lived, returning to Labrador. Nearly a year later, Cartwright noted the devastation that followed Qavvik's return. "The Inuit of southern Labrador were almost entirely wiped out by the disease".

In January 1786, Captain Cartwright and his twenty companions sacked an Indigenous (Beothuk) village of a hundred inhabitants in Newfoundland, killing some thirty women, children and old men unable to defend themselves. The Beothuk who escaped froze to death or committed suicide.

== Later life in England ==
In 1786, Cartwright returned to England. He published his diary in 1792 and continued to be interested in the politics and business of Labrador. He was barracks master of the Nottinghamshire Militia from some time during the Napoleonic Wars until 1817. He died in 1819 in Mansfield, Nottinghamshire. He had an unparalleled love for Labrador until his death – as is shown, for example, in his lengthy and somewhat tedious piece of verse, of which this is a small extract:

Fish, Fowl and Ven’son now our tables grace:
Roast Beaver too, and ev’ry Beast of Chase.
Luxurious living this! who'd wish for more?
Were Quin alive, he'd haste to Labrador!

At Cartwright, Labrador, there is a substantial monument commemorating him and his brother John. Part of the inscription reads: "In Memory of George Cartwright, Captain in his Majesty's 37th Regiment of Foot ... who in March 1770 made a settlement on the coast of Labrador ... also of John Cartwright, Lieutenant of the Guernsey ...".

== Sources ==
=== Primary sources ===
- Cartwright, George. A Journal of Transactions and Events during a Residence of nearly Sixteen Years on the Coast of Labrador. 3 vols. Newark [England] and London: Printed and sold by Allin and Ridge, sold also by G. G. J. and J. Robinson in Paternoster-Row, and J. Stockdale, Picadilly, London, 1792. Cartwright's journal, edited and published by Cartwright himself.
- Stopp, Marianne, ed. The New Labrador Papers of Captain George Cartwright. Montreal and Kingston: McGill-Queen's University Press, 2009. Previously unpublished materials by Cartwright, edited and introduced by Marianne Stopp.
- Townsend, Charles Wendell. Captain Cartwright and his Labrador Journal. Boston: Dana Estes & Company, 1911. An abridged addition edited and introduced by Charles Wendell Townsend. This edition was reprinted most recently in 2000.
- Assiniwi, Bernard Histoire des indiens du Haut et du Bas Canada, Ottawa, Éditions Léméac, 1974, 166 p.

=== Biographies ===
- Stopp, Marianne. "An Account of George Cartwright's Life." In The New Labrador Papers of Captain George Carwright, edited by Marianne Stopp. 24–33. Montreal and Kingston: McGill-Queen's University Press, 2009.
- Story, G. M. "Cartwright, George." In Dictionary of Canadian Biography, vol. V (1801-1820). Toronto: University of Toronto/Université Laval, 2003.

=== Fiction ===
- Steffler, John. The Afterlife of George Cartwright: A Novel. Toronto: McClelland and Stewart, 1992. John Steffler's fictionalized account of Cartwright based on the Labrador journal.

== See also ==
- List of people of Newfoundland and Labrador
