= Caubvick =

Caubvick (fl. 1773) was an Inuk from Labrador, a wife of one of the Inuit brought to England by George Cartwright, an English army officer, trader, and explorer in the Newfoundland Colony. Her name comes from the Inuktitut word for "wolverine" which is ᑲᑉᕕᒃ (kapvik).

In 1773, George Cartwright took Attuiock and Tooklavina and their wives, including Caubvick, to England (Kingdom of Great Britain) where they met with the king, George III, members of the Royal Society and James Boswell The Inuit all developed smallpox while in England. Caubvick was the only survivor of the group. She returned to her native Labrador and passed on the disease to many of her people.

In 1971, the highest peak in all of Labrador and east of the Rocky Mountains, previously unnamed and known as Mont D'Iberville in Quebec, was named Mount Caubvick in her honour by the Government of Newfoundland and Labrador.

== See also ==
- List of people from Newfoundland and Labrador
