= John Cartwright (political reformer) =

English naval officer and political reformer (1740–1824)

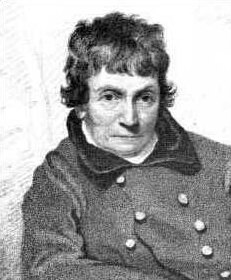
- Born: 17 September 1740; Marnham, Bassetlaw, Nottinghamshire, England, Great Britain
- Died: 23 September 1824 (aged 84); Burton Crescent, Bloomsbury, London, England
- Works: Take Your Choice; The English Constitution Produced and Illustrated
- Political party: Radical
- Spouse: Ann Catherine Dashwood (after 1780)

Philosophical work
- Era: 18th-century philosophy
- Region: Western philosophy: English philosophy
- School: Constitutionalism; Natural law; Radicalism; Reformism
- Main interests: Constitutional law; Politics

John Cartwright (28 September 1740 – 23 September 1824) was an English naval officer, Nottinghamshire Militia major and prominent campaigner for parliamentary reform. He subsequently became known as the 'Father of Reform'. His younger brother Edmund Cartwright became famous as the inventor of the power loom.

== Early life ==
He was born at Marnham in Nottinghamshire on 17 September 1740 to Anne and William Cartwright of Marnham Hall. He was the elder brother of Edmund Cartwright, inventor of the power loom, and the younger brother of George Cartwright, trader and explorer of Labrador.

He was educated at the grammar school in Newark-on-Trent and Heath Academy in Yorkshire, and at the age of eighteen entered the Royal Navy.

== Early career ==
He was present, in his first year of service, at the 1758 raid on Cherbourg, and served in the following year in the Battle of Quiberon Bay between Sir Edward Hawke and Admiral Hubert de Brienne. Engaged afterwards under Sir Hugh Palliser and Admiral John Byron on the Newfoundland Station, he was appointed to act as chief magistrate of the settlement. He served in the post for five years (1765–1770).

From 1763 to 14 May 1766, Cartwright was commander of HM Cutter Sherborne. His brother George, when at loose ends, went with him on a cruise out of Plymouth to chase smugglers in Sherborne. Ill-health necessitated Cartwright's retirement from active service for a time in 1771.

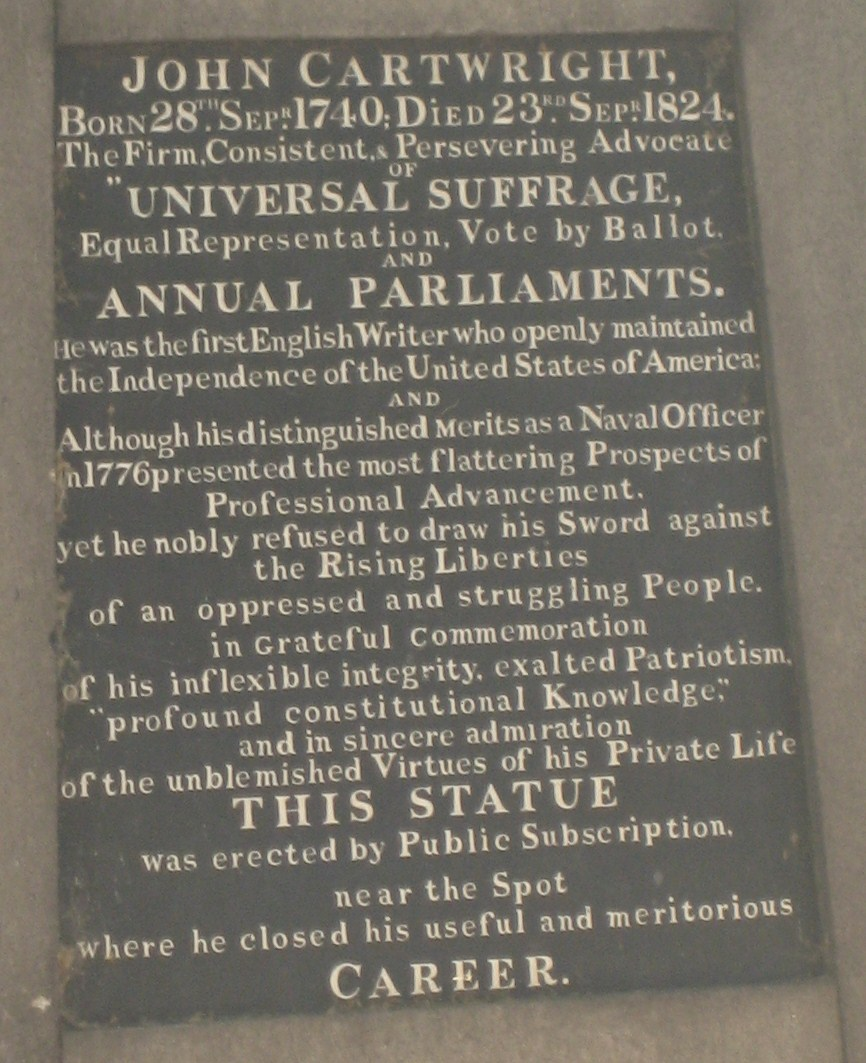
Inscription from the Cartwright Gardens statue

When the disputes with the American colonies began, he believed that the colonists had right on their side, warmly supported their cause and, at the outbreak of the ensuing American War of Independence, refused an appointment as first lieutenant to the Duke of Cumberland. Thus he gave up a path to certain promotion, since he did not wish to fight against the cause which he felt to be just. In 1774 he published his first plea on behalf of the colonists, entitled "American Independence the Glory and Interest of Great Britain".

In 1765, when the Nottinghamshire Militia was first raised, he was appointed major, and in this capacity he served for seventeen years. He was passed over for promotion; it is clear that the intention was to induce him to resign, but he would not do so. The regimental officers supported him, demanding assurances that promotion would be by seniority, and that no officer would be removed without there being a court of enquiry. He was finally removed on 23 October 1791 after he had celebrated the Storming of the Bastille.

== Constitutional reformer ==
In 1776 appeared his first work on reform in parliament, which, with the exception of Earl Stanhope's pamphlets (1774), appears to have been the earliest publication on the subject of electoral reform. It was entitled, Take your Choice; a second edition appearing under the new title of The Legislative Rights of the Commonalty Vindicated (1777) and advocated annual parliaments, the secret ballot and manhood suffrage.

The task of his life was thenceforth chiefly the attainment of universal suffrage and annual parliaments. In 1778, he conceived the project of a political association, which took shape in 1780 as the Society for Constitutional Information, including among its members some of the most distinguished men of the day. From this society sprang the more famous London Corresponding Society.

Major Cartwright worked unweariedly for the promotion of reform. He was one of the witnesses on the trial of his friends, John Horne Tooke, John Thelwall and Thomas Hardy, in 1794.

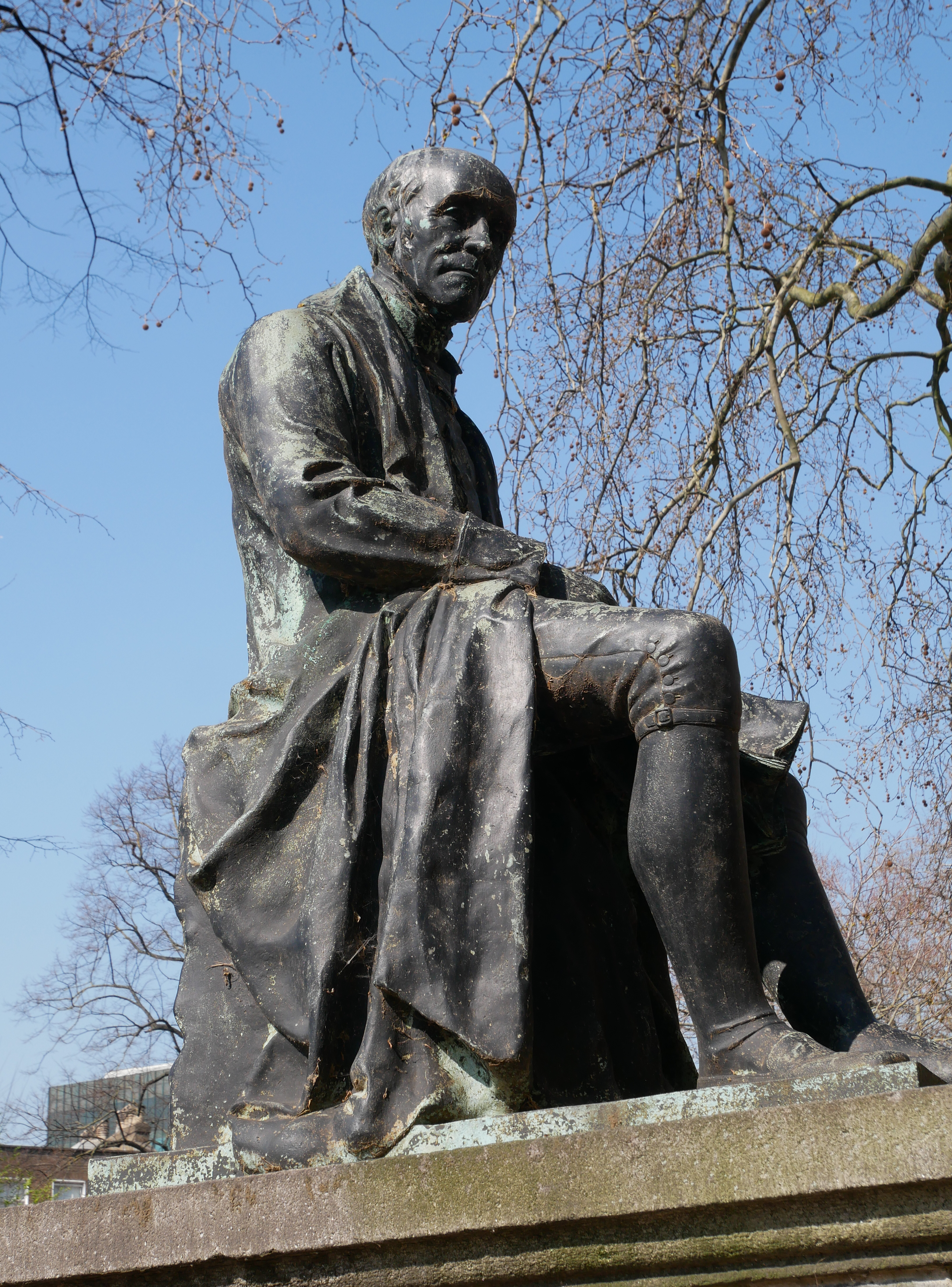
Statue of John Cartwright from Cartwright Gardens, installed in 1831

He left his large estate in Lincolnshire in 1803 or 1805 to move to Enfield, Middlesex, where he made friends with other leading Radicals including Sir Francis Burdett, 5th Baronet, William Cobbett and Francis Place.

In 1812, he initiated the Hampden Clubs, named after John Hampden, an English Civil War Parliamentary leader, aiming to bring together middle-class moderates and lower-class radicals in the reform cause. To promote the idea, he toured northwest England later in 1812, in 1813 (getting arrested in Huddersfield) and in 1815. He recruited John Knight who founded the first Hampden Club in Lancashire. In 1818, Knight, John Saxton and James Wroe formed the reformist and popularist newspaper the Manchester Observer. In 1819, the same team formed the Patriotic Union Society, which invited Henry "Orator" Hunt and Major Cartwright to speak at a reformist public rally in Manchester, but the elderly Cartwright was unable to attend what became the Peterloo Massacre. Later in 1819, Cartwright was arrested for speaking at a parliamentary reform meeting in Birmingham, indicted for conspiracy and was condemned to pay a fine of £100.

Cartwright then wrote The English Constitution, which outlined his ideas including government by the people and legal equality which he considered could only be achieved by universal suffrage, the secret ballot and equal electoral districts. He became the main patron of the Radical publisher Thomas Jonathan Wooler, best known for his satirical journal The Black Dwarf, who actively supported Cartwright's campaigning.

In 1821, he invited Jeremy Bentham to serve with him as one of "seven wise men" to act as "Guardians of Constitutional Reform", their reports and observations to concern "the entire Democracy or Commons of the United Kingdom". Among the other names Cartwright proposed—Sir Francis Burdett, Rev. William Draper; George Ensor, Rev. Richard Hayes, Robert Williams, Sir Charles Wolseley, and Matthew Wood—Bentham described himself as a "nonentity", and declined the offer.

Cartwright had sent a copy of The English Constitution to former President of the United States, Thomas Jefferson. Jefferson wrote to Cartwright in July 1824:

Your age of eighty-four, and mine of eighty-one years, ensure us a speedy meeting. We may then commune at leisure, and more fully, on the good and evil, which in the course of our long lives, we have both witnessed; and in the mean time, I pray you to accept assurances of my high veneration and esteem for your person and character.

== Industrial and agricultural innovator ==
In 1788, Major Cartwight bought an estate at Brothertoft, near Boston, Lincolnshire. He sold his heavily mortgaged estates at Marnham soon after.

Cartwright took a keen interest in agricultural improvement and used his estate at Brothertoft to conduct crop trials and to develop new agricultural implements, several of which were invented by his bailiff and later estate steward, William Amos. He turned over a large part of his estate to the cultivation of woad, creating dedicated buildings and improving the apparatus used to process the crop. He began addressing his letters as being from Brothertoft Farm.

At this time there was a building called Brothertoft Hall or Brothertoft house, to which the farm was ancillary. Cartwright extended the house with octagonal additions to both ends and applied a stucco finish to the walls. William Marrat described it as "an elegant mansion". Brothertoft Hall, substantially extended about 1850, is a Grade II listed building.

By the time he leased the estate and moved to Enfield, Middlesex in 1803, Cartwright had developed the rich loam soil into a profitable site for the cultivation of woad. Marrat recounted in 1814 that Cartwright had sold off much of the land as separate farms and that the holding had consisted of around 880 acres (360 ha).

In 1788, with 18 others, he erected a large mill at the bottom of Spital Hill in Retford. It was called the Revolution Mill in celebration of the centenary of the Glorious Revolution. He hoped to weave cloth using the weaving patents of his brother Edmund Cartwright. He also began the mechanical spinning of wool, or rather worsted. The business was not successful and the mill stood idle within a few years; it was advertised for sale in 1798 and eventually sold at great loss in 1805. Most of the buildings have been demolished - only one remains.

== Personal life ==
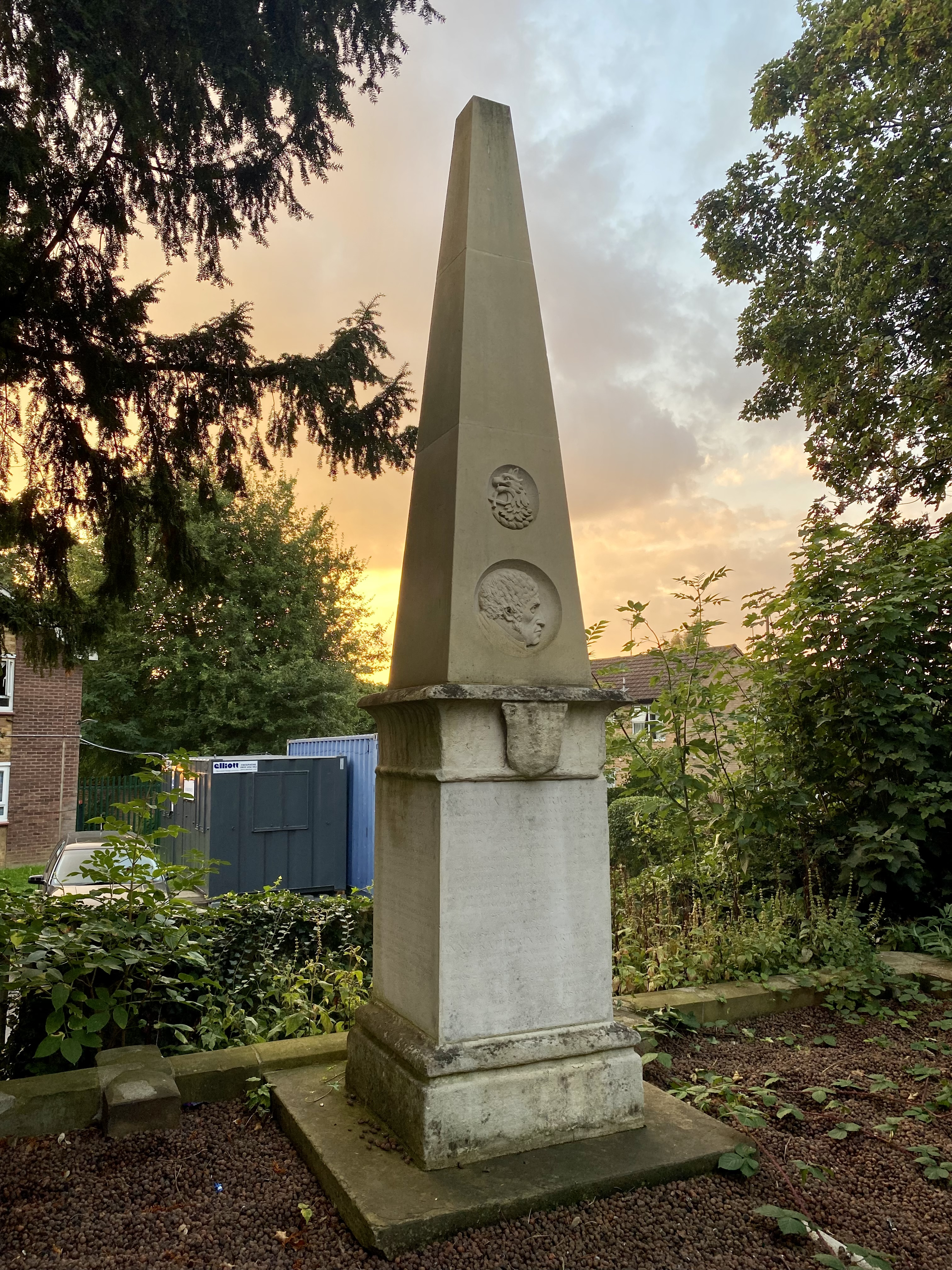
The monument to John Cartwright at St Mary-at-Finchley Church in 2021

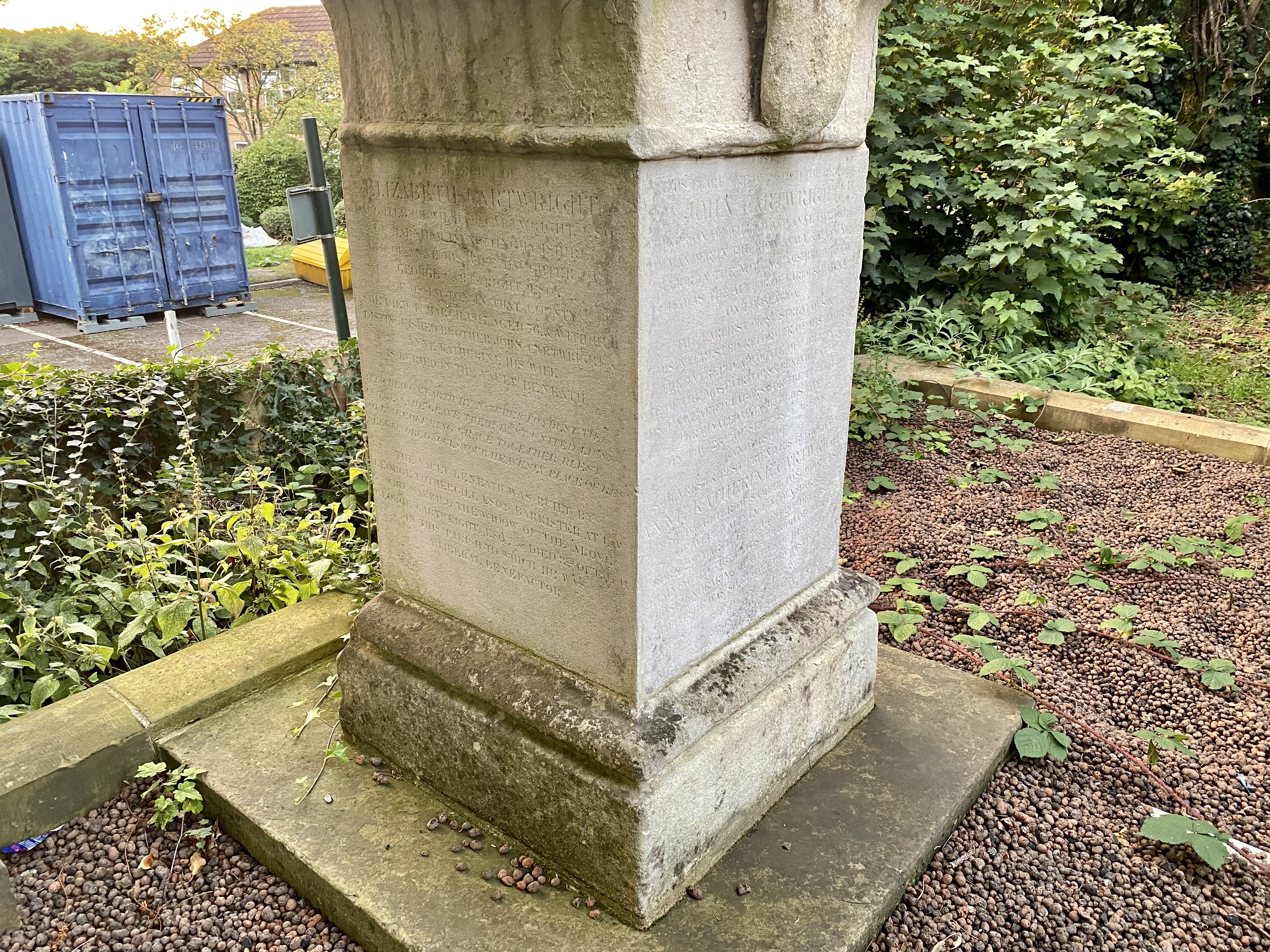
The inscriptions to John and Elizabeth Cartwright on the Cartwright monument at St Mary-at-Finchley Church

In 1780, he married Ann Catherine Dashwood, the eldest daughter of prominent Lincolnshire landowner Samuel Dashwood and Anne (née Bateman) Dashwood. She was a granddaughter of George Dashwood, MP for Stockbridge (and son of Lord Mayor of London Sir Samuel Dashwood), and James Bateman, MP for Carlisle (and son of banker Sir James Bateman). He adopted his niece Frances Dorothy Cartwright, daughter of his brother Edmund, after her mother died in 1785.

Cartwright died in London on 23 September 1824, and was buried at St Mary's Church, Finchley, north London.

== Legacy ==
In 1793 Captain George Vancouver named Cartwright Sound - on the west coast of Graham Island in Haida Gwaii (Queen Charlotte Islands), British Columbia, Canada - in his honour in relation to his Royal Navy service under Admiral Howe.

The Life and Correspondence of Major Cartwright, edited by his niece Frances Dorothy Cartwright, was published in 1826. An uncritical account, it had no competitors until 1972.

In 1831, a monument with a statue by sculptor George Clarke was erected to him in Bloomsbury, London, where he had lived. Burton Crescent, the original name of the street, was in 1908 renamed Cartwright Gardens in his honour. The statue is Grade II listed.

In 1835, a monument to him was erected in St Mary's churchyard, Finchley, paid for by public subscription. It is also Grade II listed. and was on the English Heritage Heritage at Risk Register due to its dangerous condition. The monument was removed from the register after being restored in 2019, as a result of a £79,000 grant from Historic England.

John Cartwright House, built in 1976 on the Mansford Estate in Bethnal Green, was named in his honour. The housing estate was built by Tower Hamlets Council and a number of the blocks were named after social and political reformers. In 2006, the estate transferred to Tower Hamlets Community Housing, a local housing association.
