= Edmund Cartwright =

British inventor (1743–1823)

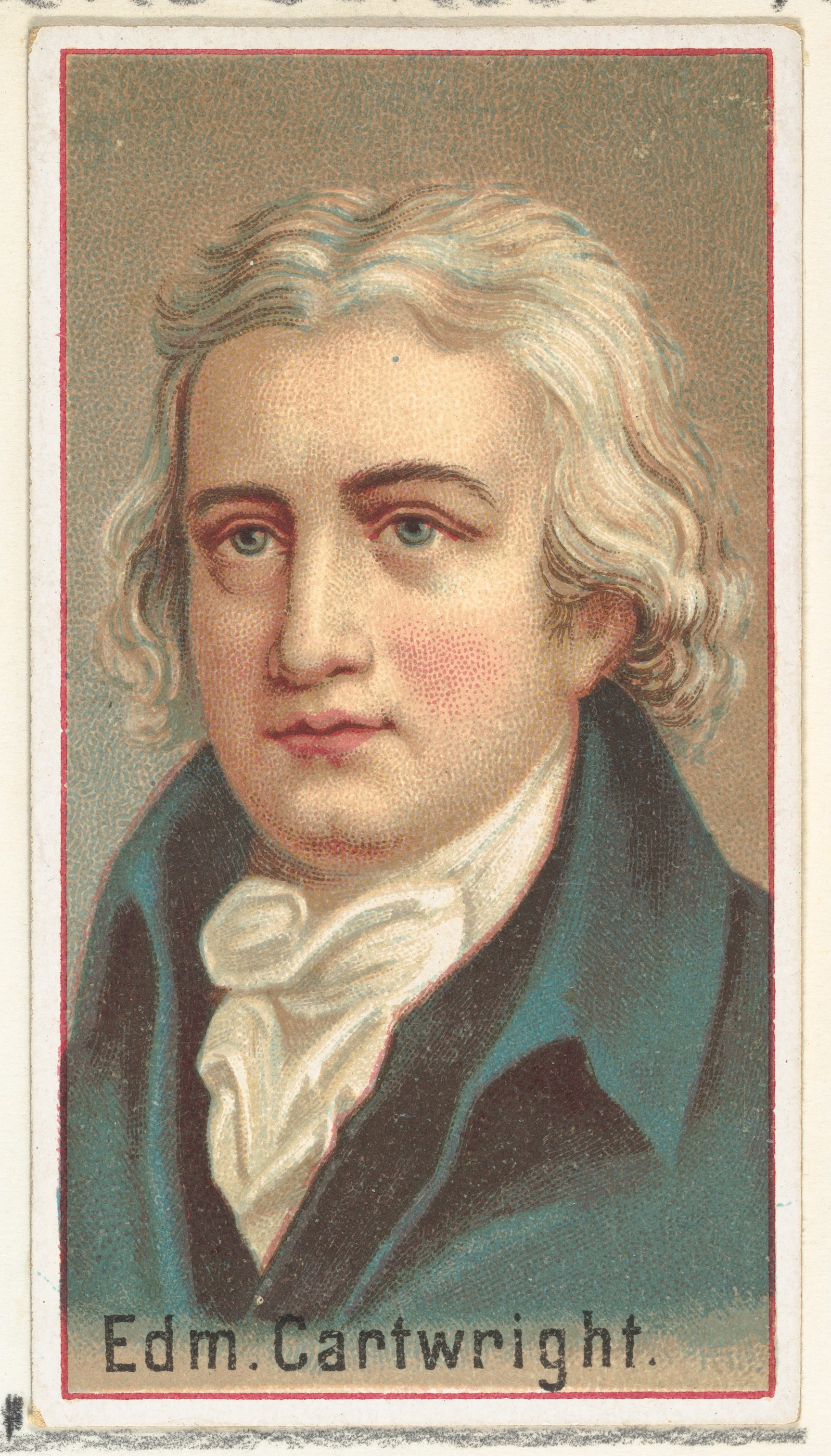
- Edmund Cartwright
- Born: 24 April 1743 (N.S.); Marnham, Nottinghamshire, England
- Died: 30 October 1823 (aged 80); Hastings, Sussex, England
- Resting place: Battle, Sussex
- Education: Oxford University
- Occupations: Clergyman, inventor
- Known for: Power loom

Edmund Cartwright FSA (24 April 1743 – 30 October 1823) was an English inventor. He graduated from Oxford University and went on to invent the power loom. Married to local Elizabeth McMac at 19, he was the brother of Major John Cartwright, a political reformer and radical, and George Cartwright, explorer of Labrador.

== Life ==
He was the fourth son of William Cartwright and his wife Anne née Cartwright, born at Marnham, Nottinghamshire. He was educated at Queen Elizabeth Grammar School, Wakefield. He matriculated in 1760 at University College, Oxford, where he had studied under-age from 1757. He graduated B.A. in 1764, M.A. in 1766, elected a Fellow of Magdalen College, Oxford in 1764. He was awarded the degree of DD in 1806.

Ordained deacon in the Church of England in 1765, and priest in 1767, Cartwright was appointed rector of Kilvington in 1767. With other livings, in 1779 he became also rector of Goadby Marwood, Leicestershire, and in 1783, he was elected a prebendary at Lincoln Cathedral.

For a time Cartwright served as chaplain to the Duke of Bedford at Woburn Abbey and acted as tutor to the Duke's son, the future Prime Minister Lord John Russell. Following the award of the parliamentary grant, Cartwright purchased a small farm in Kent, where he spent the rest of his life.

Edmund Cartwright died in Sussex after a lingering illness and was buried at Battle.

== Power loom ==
Cartwright designed his first power loom in 1784 and patented it in 1785, after some contact with textile men from Manchester; its value was only in proof of concept, but the type of design continued into the 20th century. Subsequent research and development work by others is now given much of the credit for a practical powered loom. In 1809 Cartwright obtained a grant of £10,000 from Parliament for his invention.

In 1789, Cartwright patented another loom which served as the model for later inventors to work upon. For a mechanically driven loom to become a commercial success, either one person would have to be able to attend to more than one machine, or each machine must have a greater productive capacity than one manually controlled. He added improvements, including a positive let-off motion, warp and weft stop motions, and sizing the warp while the loom was in action. He commenced to manufacture fabrics in Doncaster using these looms, and discovered many of their shortcomings. He attempted to remedy these in a number of ways: by introducing a crank and eccentric wheels to actuate its batten differentially, by improving the picking mechanism, by means of a device for stopping the loom when a shuttle failed to enter a shuttle box, by preventing a shuttle from rebounding when in a box, and by stretching the cloth with temples that acted automatically. His mill was repossessed by creditors in 1793.

In 1792, Cartwright obtained his final patent for weaving machinery; this provided his loom with multiple shuttle boxes for weaving checks and cross stripes. All his efforts were unavailing, however; it became apparent that no mechanism, however perfect, could succeed so long as warps continued to be sized while a loom was stationary. His plans for sizing them while a loom was in operation, and before being placed in a loom, failed. These problems were resolved in 1803, by William Radcliffe and his assistant Thomas Johnson, by their inventions of the beam warper, and the dressing sizing machine.

In 1790 Robert Grimshaw of Gorton, Manchester erected a weaving factory at Knott Mill which he intended to fill with 500 of Cartwright's power looms, but with only 30 in place the factory was burnt down, probably as an act of arson inspired by the fears of hand loom weavers. The prospect of success was not sufficiently promising to induce its re-erection.

In May 1821, Cartwright was elected a Fellow of the Royal Society.

== Other inventions ==
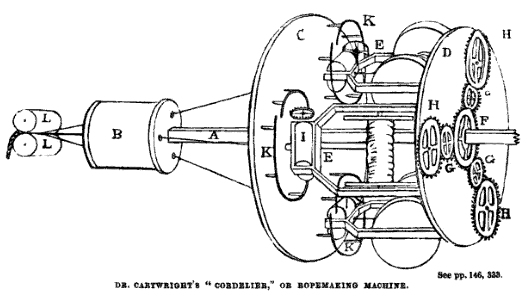
Ropemaking machine of Edmund Cartwright

Cartwright patented a wool combing machine in 1789 and a cordelier (machine for making rope) in 1792. He also designed a steam engine that used alcohol instead of water.

== Works ==
Cartwright had John Langhorne as a tutor, and developed as a minor poet. He published the poem Armine and Elvira in 1770, which was followed by The Prince of Peace in 1779, directed against the American Revolutionary War. His Sonnets to Eminent Men (1783) included an ode to Thomas Howard, 3rd Earl of Effingham, a conspicuous supporter of American independence.

== Family ==
Cartwright married in 1772, Alice Whitaker, daughter of Alderman Richard Whitaker of Doncaster, who died in 1785. Their second daughter Elizabeth (1780–1837) married the Reverend John Penrose and wrote books under the pseudonym "Mrs Markham". Their daughter Mary married Henry Eustatius Strickland, a younger son of Sir George Strickland, 5th Baronet, and was mother of Hugh Edwin Strickland. She was her father's biographer, publishing A Memoir of the Life, Writings, and Inventions, of Edmund Cartwright, D.D. FRS (1843) which incorporated a memoir by Cartwright.

Their son the Rev. Edmund Cartwright (1773–1833) was a Fellow of the Royal Society and of the Society of Antiquaries of London. The youngest child of the marriage was Frances Dorothy Cartwright, poet and biographer of her uncle the radical Major John Cartwright.

Cartwright married secondly, in 1790, Susannah Kearney, daughter of John Kearney. He was survived by her and the four children above from his first marriage. Growing up he also had many siblings, including the famous John Cartwright.

== See also ==
- Timeline of clothing and textiles technology
