= John Charles Mason =

British secretary (1798–1881)

John Charles Mason (1798–1881) was a British East India Company servant and marine secretary to the Indian government (home establishment).

== Early life ==
Mason, born in London in March 1798, was the only son of Alexander Way Mason, chief clerk in the secretary's office of the East India Company's home service, and one of the founders and editors of the ‘East India Register’ in 1803. His grandfather, Charles Mason, served with distinction in the expedition to Guadeloupe in 1758–9, and with the allied army in Germany in 1762 and in 1793–6.

== Education ==
John Charles was educated at Monsieur de la Pierre's commercial school in Hackney and at Lord Weymouth's grammar school at Warminster. For three years he served in the office of Dunn, Wordsworth, & Dunn, solicitors, 32 Threadneedle Street, till in April 1817 he received an appointment in the secretary's office at the East India House on the ground of his father's services—a unique episode in the history of the company's patronage.

== Employment ==
From 1817 to 1837 he was almost wholly employed upon confidential duties under the committee of secrecy—namely, in 1823 in negotiating a treaty with the government of the Netherlands for the cession of the settlement in the Straits of Malacca to the Dutch; in 1829 in arranging the secret signals for the East India Company's ships; in 1833 in negotiating for the renewal of the company's charter; and in 1834 in the parliamentary inquiry upon matters connected with China.

He compiled in 1825–6 ‘An Analysis of the Constitution of the East India Company, and of the Laws passed by Parliament for the Government of their Affairs at Home and Abroad.’ In 1837 he was made secretary of the newly created marine branch of the secretary's office; under his management the Indian navy was greatly improved, the coasts of India were surveyed, and in 1857, on the breaking out of the mutiny, he arranged for the transport of fifty thousand troops to India with great expedition.

In September 1858, upon the transfer of the government of India from the company to the crown, he retired from the service, but in January 1859 he was recalled and became secretary of the marine and transport department at the East India House, Leadenhall Street, and afterwards at the India office, Whitehall. The evidence he furnished to the select committees in 1860, 1861, and 1865 on the transport of troops to India led to his being appointed in 1865 the member to represent the government of India on the committee on the Indian overland troop transport service. In accordance with that committee's report of 1867, the Crocodile, Euphrates, Jumna, Malabar, and Serapis were constructed as troop-ships to convey troops to and from India.

In April 1867 he retired from the service, and died at 12 Pembridge Gardens, Bayswater, London, 21 Dec. 1881.

By his wife Jane Augusta, daughter of James Ensor, who died in 1878, he left five daughters and an only son, Charles Alexander James Mason, born in 1832, who served in the Indian (home) service from 1848, became assistant secretary in the military department, and retired in 1882.
