= Bernard Assiniwi =

- Born: 31 August 1935; Montreal, Quebec, Canada
- Died: 4 September 2000 (aged 65); Cantley, Quebec, Canada
- Education: University of Guelph
- Occupations: Novelist, actor, journalist
- Spouse: Marina Assiniwi
- Writing career
- Language: French
- Genres: Novel; non-fiction
- Notable work: La Saga des Béothuks (1997)
- Notable awards: French- Quebec Jean-Hamelin literature prize 1997

Bernard Assiniwi (pseudonym: "Chagnan" born July 31, 1935, in Montreal; died September 4, 2000) was a Québécois writer and broadcaster of purely French-Canadian extraction who claimed to be Indigenous. In addition to that he was a researcher in Aboriginal History, a producer, and an actor. One of his best known works is La Saga des Béothuks or The Beothuk Saga in the English translation by Wayne Grady.

== Biography ==
He was born Bernard Lapierre on July 31, 1935, in Montreal, the son of Joseph-Leonidas Zephirin Lapierre, born in the parish of Sault-au-Recollet (north of Montreal), and Eglantine Bleau, born in Montreal, both of Quebecois heritage. As a child French was the language of his schooling and he claimed to have learned cree. In an interview with the French newspaper Libération in 1999, he claimed his father grew up on the Lac Tapawnee reserve (Lac Tipani is jn the Laurentians) but no such reserve exists.

As a teenager, Bernard Lapierre began identifying as Mohawk and then "Algo-Cri", then later claimed to be of Cree and Algonquin extraction, but his ancestry was French-Canadian. He made a legal name change from Lapierre to Assiniwi in 1971.

He graduated from the University of Guelph, obtaining a BScA in animal science.

He went on to follow a variety of careers. He was involved with the beginning of the cultural section of the Department of Indian Affairs and Northern Development from 1965 to 1968. In 1965, he also appeared in the film La vie heureuse de Léopold Z. Other film appearances were Les smattes (1972) and Les forges de Saint-Maurice (1973). He also served as curator of the Easter Subarctic Cultural area of the Canadian Museum of Civilization until his death in 2000.

From 1968, Assiniwi published over 30 books, as well as writing journal articles, and writing and producing for radio, theater and film. He is considered an important contributor to Canadian literature from a French Canadian Indigenous perspective, paving the way for other Indigenous authors to follow. In 1971, he was one of the first Indigenous authors to write a French language work that was largely read throughout Québec (Anish-nah-be: Contes adultes du pays algonkin, published by Leméac), For this book, he received a mention in the Prix littéraire de la Ville de Montréal. Assiniwi went to work for Leméac, from 1972 à 1976, as a director. In 1999, The University of Québec and Trois-Rivières bestowed upon Assiniwi an honorary doctorate for his literary contributions.

In 1988, Bernard Lapierre-Assiniwi and his son Marc-André founded the International Aboriginal Research Bureau of Canada (IARBC), whose mission was to help their clients find their indigenous ancestry and obtain indian status. The business closed in 1992.

Assiniwi was married to Marina Assiniwi and they had three sons : Marc-André Assiniwi, Christian Assiniwi, and Jean-Yves Assiniwi.

Assiniwi died on 4 September 2000, at age 65, from a heart attack following heart surgery.

In 2001, Land Insights created the prix Dr. Bernard-Chagnan-Assiniwi, awarded for the first time in 2001 to Indigenous artists or creators whose work had contributes to their original culture.

== Controversy concerning his indigenous identity ==
Bernard Lapierre-Assiniwi built his entire career on his indigenous identity. However, over the years, doubts were expressed over the credibility of his algo-cry ancestry. On November 4, 2026, the Quebec magazine L'Actualité published an article titled: «Le bricolage identitaire de Bernard Assiniwi». The author, Louis Hamelin, interviewed many indigenous and non-indigenous academics and researchers and concluded that his indigenous identity was fabricated.

== Awards ==
He won the Jean-Hamelin literature prize for French and Quebecois authors in 1997. He was also shortlisted for the Governor General prize of Canada in the same year. Assiniwi's Pre-Recruit Training Camp (1993) was awarded a Bronze Plaque (best screenplay) at the 41st Columbus Film Festival.

== Published works ==
Year	Title	Publisher
1972	Recettes Typiques des Indiens (Standard Indian Recipes)	Éditions Leméac
1972	Survie en Forêt (Survival in the Bush)	Éditions Leméac
1972	Survival in the Bush (Eng. tr. of Survie en Forêt)	Copp-Clark
1971	Anish-Nah-Be: Contes Adultes du Pays Algonkin (Anishnabe: Adult Tales of the Algonquians)	Éditions Leméac
1972	Indian Recipes	
1972	A l'Indienne (To the Indian Woman)	Éditions Leméac
1973	L'Histoire des Indiens de Haut et Bas Canada (The History of the Indians of Upper and Lower Canada (3 Volumes)	Éditions Leméac
1973	Lexique Des Noms Indiens En Amerique: Tome 1 Noms Geographiques (Lexicon of Indian Names in America: Volume 1, Geographic Names)	Éditions Leméac
1973	Lexique Des Noms Indiens En Amerique: Tome 2 ? (Lexicon of Indian Names in America: Volume 2, ?)	Éditions Leméac
1973	Makwa, Le Petit Algonquin (Makwa, the Little Algonquian) (children's book)	Éditions Leméac
1979	Les Cris des Marais (The Cries of the Marais)	Éditions Leméac
1979	Les Montagnais et les Naskapi (The Montagnais and Naskapi Indians)	Éditions Leméac
1979	Le Guerrier aux Pieds Agiles (The Fleet-footed Warrior)	Éditions Leméac
1983	Il n'y a Plus d'Indiens (There Are No More Indians)	Éditions Leméac
1985	Contes Adultes des Territoires Algonkins (Adult Tales of the Algonquian Territories, re-release of 1971 edition Anish-Nah-Be)	Éditions Leméac
1993	Pre-Recruit Training Camp (screenplay)	
1987, 1994	Faites Votre Vin Vous-même (Make Your Own Wine)	Éditions Leméac, Bibliothèque Québécoise
1994	Odawa Pontiac (Ottawa Pontiac)	Éditions XYZ
1996	Lexique des Noms Indiens de Canada: Les Noms Géographiques (Lexicon of Canadian Indian Names (2 Volumes): Volume 1, Geographic Names)	Éditions Leméac
1997	La Saga des Béothuks	Éditions Leméac
1998	Ikwé, la Femme Algonquienne (Ikwé, Algonquian Woman)	Vents d'Ouest
1998	Windigo et la Naissance du Monde (Windigo and the birth of the world)	Vents d'Ouest
2000	The Beothuk Saga (Eng. tr. of La Saga des Béothuks by Wayne Grady)	McClelland & Stewart
2008	Le Bras Coupé (The Cut Arm)	Bibliothèque Québécoise
