= John Penrose (priest) =

John Penrose (15 December 1778 – 9 August 1859) was a British Church of England clergyman and theological writer.

== Early life ==
John Penrose was born in Cardinham in Cornwall, where his father, also named John, was vicar of the parish. Penrose was educated at Blundell's School in Tiverton and at Corpus Christi College in Oxford. He received a BA in 1799 and an MA in 1802.

== Career ==
Penrose was ordained at Exeter in 1801. He held a number of ecclesiastical positions throughout his lifetime, including:

- Vicar of Langton by Wragby in Lincolnshire
- Vicar of Poundstock in Cornwall
- Vicar of Bracebridge in Lincolnshire
- The perpetual curacy of North Hykeham in Lincolnshire was awarded to Penrose in 1837.

In 1814 Penrose married Elizabeth Cartwright, a teacher and author of children's books under the name Mrs Markham. The couple were the parents of three sons of whom Francis Penrose was an architect and Charles Penrose a clergyman who succeed to his father's livings.

== Writings ==
His most significant published works include:

- An attempt to prove the truth of Christianity (1805) (written while serving as Bampton lecturer at Oxford University in 1805)
- An Inquiry into the Nature of Human Motives (1820)
- A treatise on the evidence of the Scripture miracles (1826)
- Of Christian Sincerity (1829)
- The Utilitarian Theory of Morals (1836)
- Lives of Vice-Admiral Sir Charles Vinicombe Penrose, K.C.B. and Captain James Trevenen, knight of the Russian orders of St. George and St. Vladimir (1850), London: John Murray, ISBN 0-665-40063-2

The collection of the Pitts Theology Library includes a three-page letter from John Penrose to an unnamed bishop, dated 24 November 1844 commenting on the character of Thomas Arnold.

== Sources ==
- Penrose, John, Archives and Manuscripts Dept, Pitts Theology Library, Emory University
- Penrose, John, Church of England clergyman and theological writer, Oxford Dictionary of National Biography (subscription required)
