= Wool combing machine =

Machine to lay the wool fibers parallel by length

Cartwright's Woolcombing Machinery Act 1801
- Act of Parliament
- Parliament of the United Kingdom
- Long title: An act for vesting, for a limited time, in the reverend Edmund Cartwright clerk, master of arts, his executors, administrators, and assigns, the sole property in certain machinery by him invented for woolcombing.
- Citation: 41 Geo. 3. (U.K.) c. cxxxiii

Dates
- Royal assent: 2 July 1801

Text of statute as originally enacted

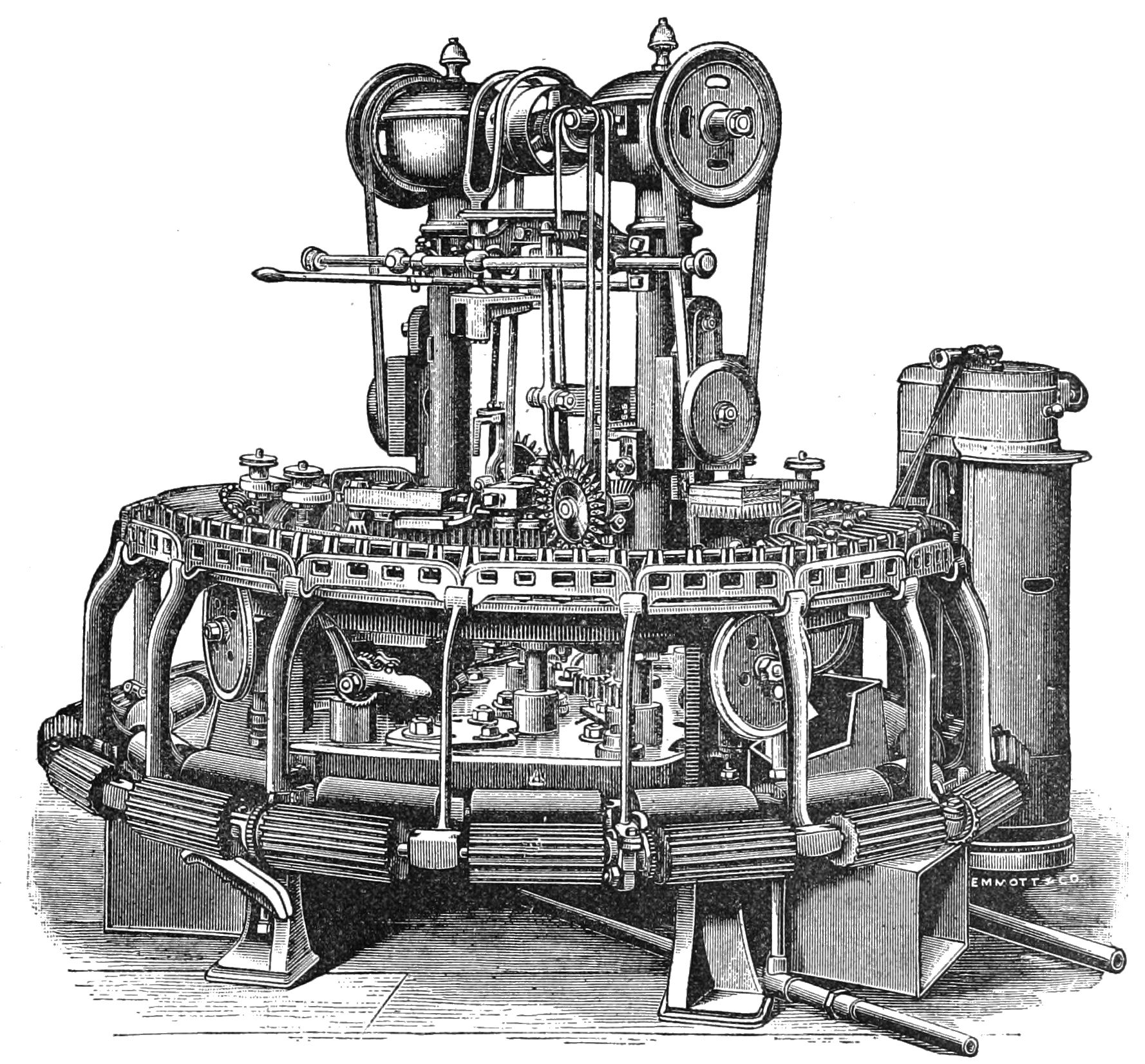
An illustration of James Noble's wool combing machine, called the Noble Comb, from Popular Science in 1891.

The wool combing machine was invented by Edmund Cartwright, the inventor of the power loom, in Doncaster. The machine was used to arrange and lay parallel by length the fibers of wool, prior to further treatment.

Cartwright's invention, nicknamed "Big Ben," was originally patented in April 1790, with subsequent patents following in December 1790 and May 1792 as the machine's design was refined by Cartwright. This machine is the first example of mechanization of the wool combing stage of the textile manufacturing process, and a significant achievement for the textile industry. Cartwright's machine was described as doing the work of 20 hand-combers.

The wool combing machine was improved refined by many later inventors, including Josué Heilmann, Samuel Cunliffe Lister, Isaac Holden, and James Noble.
