= St Wilfrid's Church, Low Marnham =

Coordinates: 53.2155°N 0.7933°W

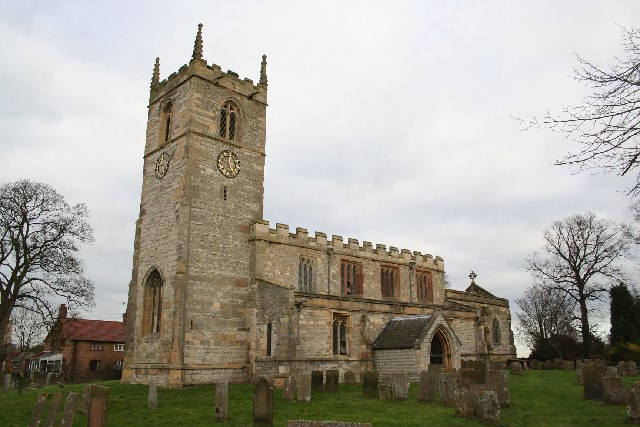
- St Wilfrid's Church, Low Marnham, from the southwest

- Location in Nottinghamshire
- OS grid reference: SK 806 693
- Location: Low Marnham, Nottinghamshire
- Country: England
- Denomination: Anglican
- Website: Churches Conservation Trust

History
- Dedication: Saint Wilfrid

Architecture
- Functional status: Redundant
- Heritage designation: Grade I
- Designated: 1 February 1967
- Architectural type: Church
- Style: Perpendicular
- Groundbreaking: 13th century

Specifications
- Materials: Stone, slate roofs

St Wilfrid's Church is a redundant Anglican church in the village of Low Marnham, Nottinghamshire, England. It is recorded in the National Heritage List for England as a designated Grade I listed building, and is under the care of the Churches Conservation Trust.

== History ==
The church dates from the 13th century, with additions or alterations in the 14th, 15th and 19th centuries, and a restoration in 1846.

== Architecture ==
=== Exterior ===
St Wilfrid's is constructed in stone with slate roofs. Its plan consists of a nave with a clerestory, north and south aisles, a south porch, a north chapel, a chancel and a west tower. From the exterior, the style of the church is Perpendicular. The tower is in two stages, with diagonal buttresses. In the lower stage is a three-light west window, and there are clock faces on the north, west and south sides. The upper stage contains two-light bell openings on each side. At the top of the tower is an embattled parapet with pinnacles at the corners, and two gargoyles. The north wall of the north aisle contains four three-light windows, an arched doorway, and five gargoyles. There is a three-light window in both the west and east walls of this aisle. The north chapel has a similar window. Along both walls of the clerestory are four three-light windows and five gargoyles. At the east end of the chancel is a three-light window and two gargoyles. In the south wall of the chancel is a doorway with a two-light window on each side. On the south side of the south aisle is a porch, with a three-light window to its right and a two-light window to the left. The doorway in the porch has an ogee arch with multiple layers of moulding, at the bottom of which are carved heads. In the west end of the aisle is a single-light window.

=== Interior ===
The arcades differ in that the north arcade is carried on low cylindrical pillars with circular capitals, while the south arcade has taller octagonal pillars with detached shafts. In the south wall of the chancel is a tomb recess, and in the south wall of the south aisle is a piscina and an aumbry. The church contains monuments to the Cartwright family. There is a hatchment dated 1749 in the north aisle, and a fragment of 15th-century stained glass.

== See also ==
- Grade I listed buildings in Nottinghamshire
- Listed buildings in Marnham, Nottinghamshire
- List of churches preserved by the Churches Conservation Trust in the English Midlands
