= Low Marnham =

Coordinates: 53.2155°N 0.7933°W

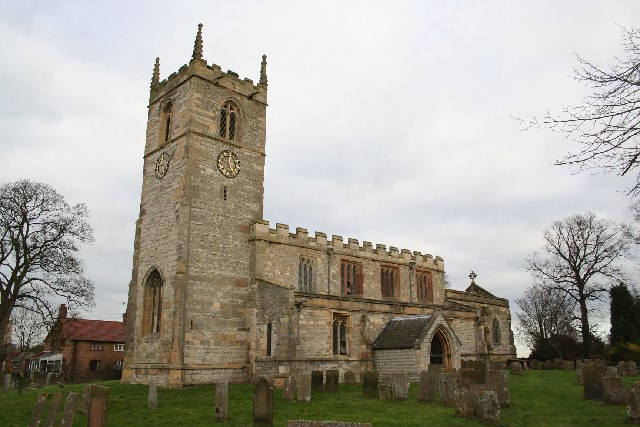
- St Wilfrid's Church

- Location within Nottinghamshire
- OS grid reference: SK8069
- Civil parish: Marnham
- District: Bassetlaw
- Shire county: Nottinghamshire
- Region: East Midlands
- Country: England
- Sovereign state: United Kingdom
- Post town: Newark-on-Trent
- Postcode district: NG23
- Police: Nottinghamshire
- Fire: Nottinghamshire
- Ambulance: East Midlands
- UK Parliament: Newark

Low Marnham is a small village 12 miles east of Edwinstowe, in the civil parish of Marnham, in the Bassetlaw district, in the county of Nottinghamshire, England. Located in the village is St Wilfrid's Church, a grade I listed building.

== See also ==
- Listed buildings in Marnham, Nottinghamshire
