= Mrs Markham =

English writer

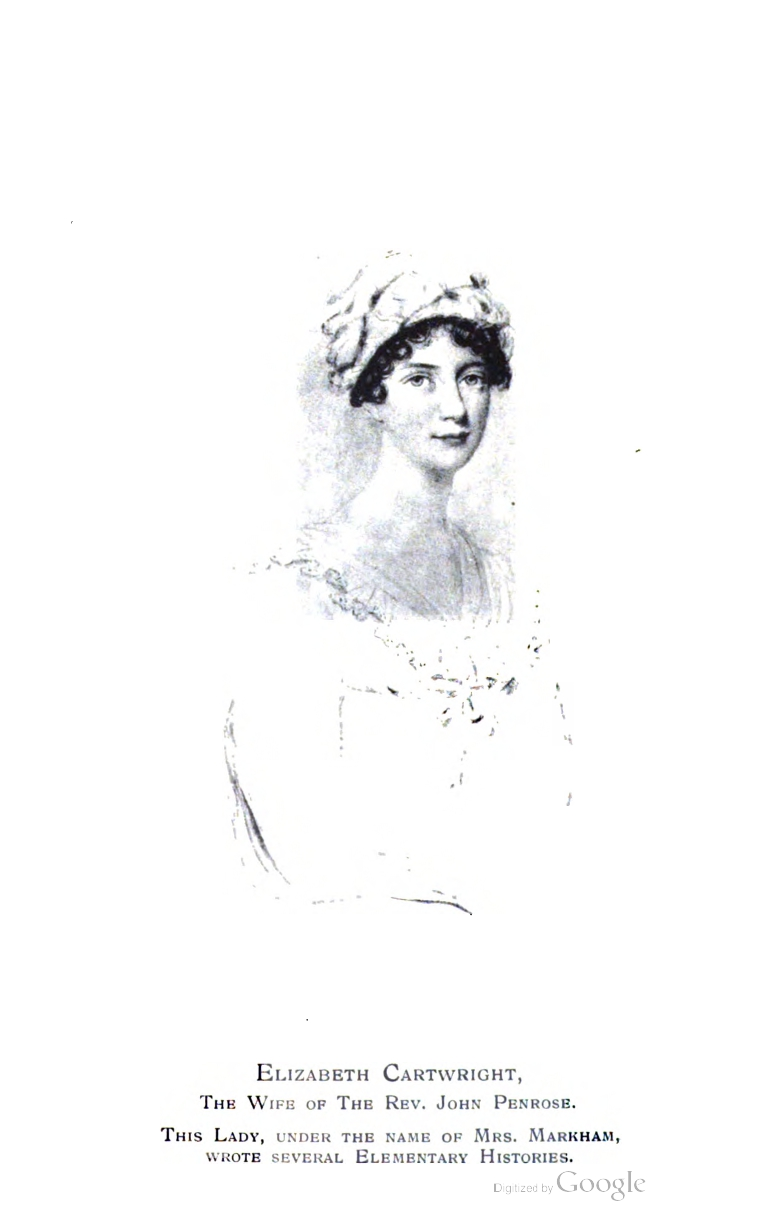
Elizabeth Penrose, also known by the pseudonym Mrs. Markham

Elizabeth Penrose (3 August 1780 – 24 January 1837), known by her pseudonym Mrs Markham, was an English writer.

== Life ==
Elizabeth Penrose [nee Cartwright] was the second daughter of Edmund Cartwright, the inventor of the power loom, and Alice Whittaker (daughter of Richard Whittaker of Doncaster). She was born at her father's rectory at Goadby Marwood, Leicestershire. Her mother died in 1785, and after the father's second marriage in 1790, she was sent to Manor School in York and spent much of her childhood with paternal relatives. In 1814, she married Reverend John Penrose, a country clergyman in Lincolnshire and a voluminous theological writer. During her girlhood, Mrs Penrose had frequently stayed with close relatives and guardians, the Misses Cartwright, at Mirfield Hall, Markham, a village in Nottinghamshire. She met her husband in the village, and used its name as the nom de plume of "Mrs Markham", under which she gained celebrity as a writer of history and other books for the young.

== Works ==
The best known of her books was A History of England from the First Invasion by the Romans to the End of the Reign of George III (1823), which went through numerous editions. In 1828, she published a History of France. Both these works enjoyed a wide popularity in America as well as in England. The distinctive characteristic of Mrs Markham's histories was the elimination of all the "horrors" of history, and of the complications of party politics, as being unsuitable for the youthful mind; and the addition to each chapter of "Conversations" between a fictitious group consisting of teacher and pupils bearing upon the subject matter.

Her less well-known works were Amusements of Westernheath, or Moral Stories for Children (2 volumes, 1824); A Visit to the Zoological Gardens (1829); two volumes of stories entitled The New Children's Friend (1832); Historical Conversations for Young People (1836); Sermons for Children (1837).

== Family ==
Mrs Markham had three sons, including the architect Francis Crammer Penrose (father of Emily Penrose), and died at Lincoln on 24 January 1837 and was buried in Lincoln Minster. There is a stained glass window to her memory in East Markham Church.
