= Labrador =

Mainland portion of Newfoundland and Labrador

- Flag
- Etymology: Portuguese
- Nickname: "The Big Land"
- Motto: Munus splendidum mox explebitur (Latin for 'The splendid task will soon be fulfilled')
- Anthem: "Ode to Labrador"
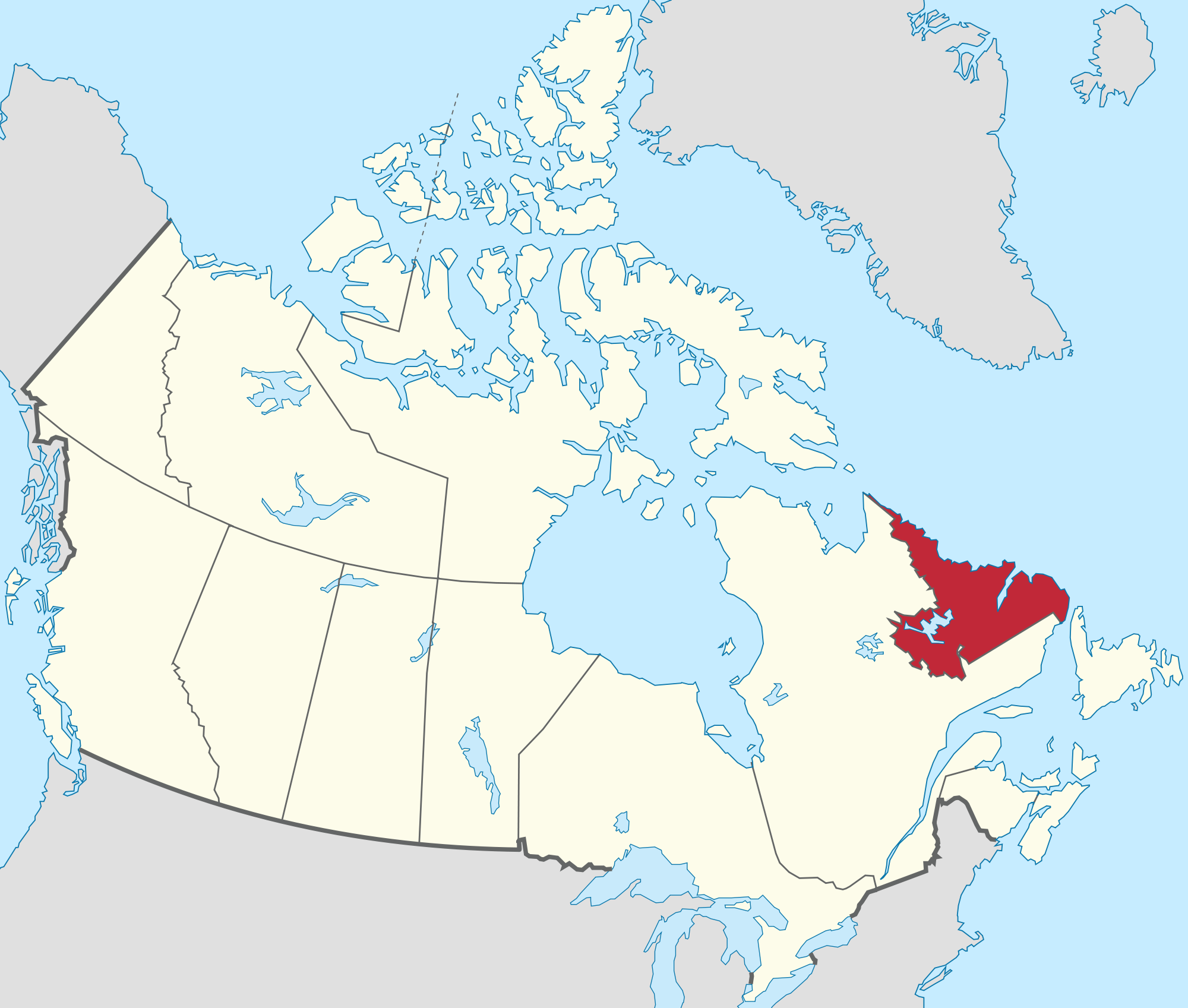
- Labrador (red) within Canada
- Coordinates: 54°N 62°W
- Country: Canada
- Province: Newfoundland and Labrador
- Ceded to Great Britain by the Treaty of Paris: 1763
- Became part of the Province of Lower Canada: 1791
- Transferred to Newfoundland Colony: 1809

Area
  - Total: 294,330 km^{2} (113,640 sq mi)

Population (2021)
  - Total: 26,655
  - Density: 0.090562/km^{2} (0.23455/sq mi)
- Time zones: UTC−4 (AST)
  - Summer (DST): UTC−3 (ADT)
- UTC−3:30 (NST)
  - Summer (DST): UTC−2:30 (NDT)
- MP: 1
- MHA: 4
- Ethnic groups: English, Innu, Inuit, Métis

Labrador (/ˈlæbrədɔːr/) is a geographic and cultural region within the Canadian province of Newfoundland and Labrador. It is the primarily continental portion of the province and constitutes 71% of the province's area but is home to only 6% of its population. It is separated from the island of Newfoundland by the Strait of Belle Isle. It is the largest and northernmost geographical region in the four Atlantic provinces.

Labrador occupies most of the eastern part of the Labrador Peninsula. It is bordered to the west and south by the province of Quebec. Labrador also shares a small land border with the territory of Nunavut on Killiniq Island.

The indigenous peoples of Labrador include the Northern Inuit of Nunatsiavut, the Southern-Inuit of NunatuKavut, and the Innu of Nitassinan.

== Etymology ==
Labrador is named after João Fernandes Lavrador, a Portuguese explorer who sailed along the coasts of the Labrador Peninsula in 1498–1499.

Labrador's name in the Inuttitut/Inuktitut language (spoken in Nunatsiavut) is Nunatsuak (ᓄᓇᑦᓱᐊᒃ), meaning "the big land" (a common English nickname for Labrador).

== History ==
=== Early history ===
Early settlement in Labrador was tied to the sea as demonstrated by the Innu (formerly called Montagnais) and Inuit, although these peoples also made significant forays throughout the interior.

It is believed that the Norsemen were the first Europeans to sight Labrador around 1000 AD. The area was known as Markland in Greenlandic Norse and its inhabitants were known as the Skrælings.

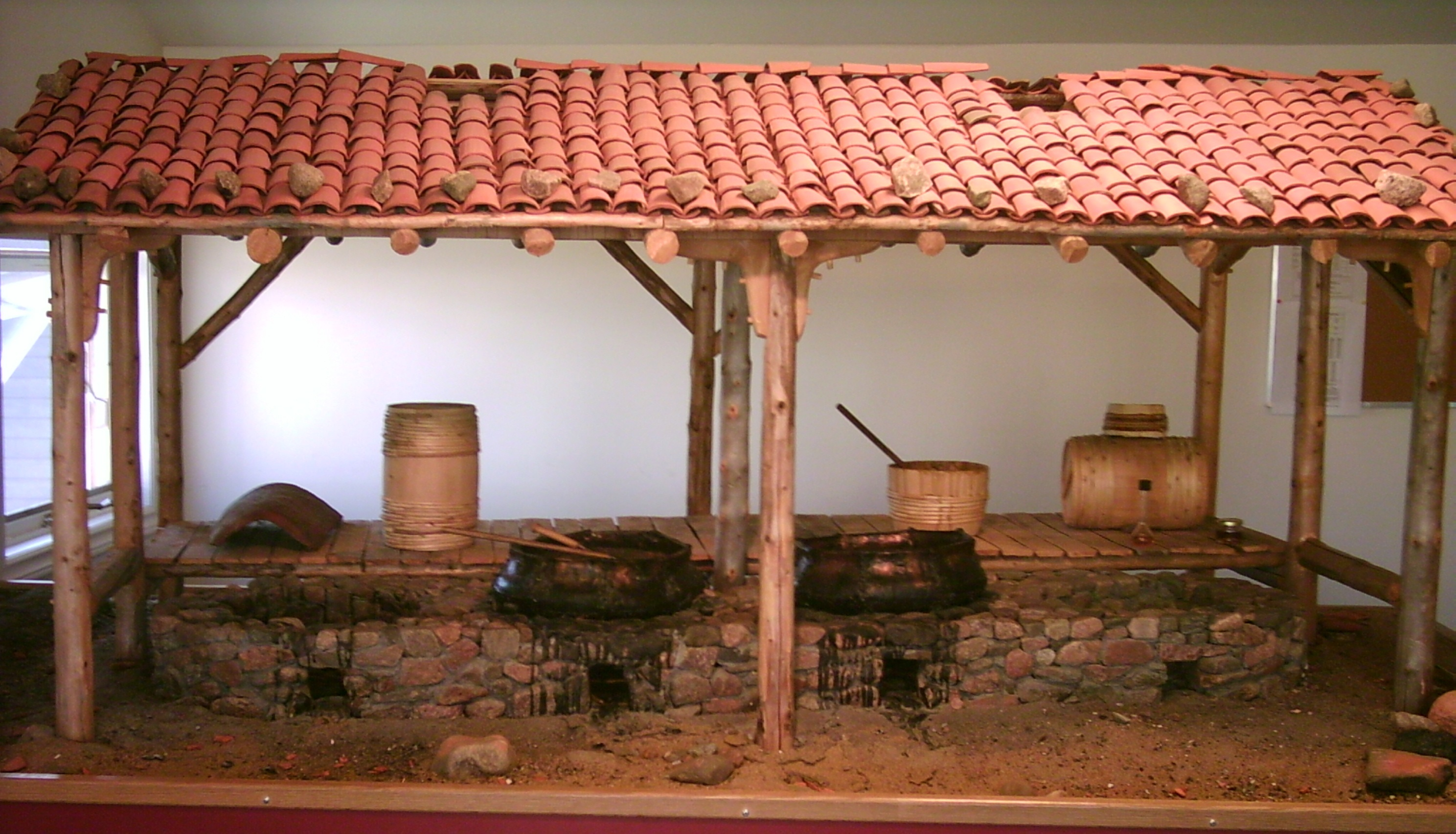
Model of Basque whale oil melting factory at Red Bay

In 1499 and 1500, the Portuguese explorers João Fernandes Lavrador and Pero de Barcelos reached what was probably now Labrador, which is believed to be the origin of its name. Maggiolo's World Map, 1511, shows a solid Eurasian continent running from Scandinavia around the North Pole, including Asia's arctic coast, to Newfoundland-Labrador and Greenland. On the extreme northeast promontory of North America, Maggiolo place names include Terra de los Ingres (Land of the English), and Terra de Lavorador de rey de portugall (Land of Lavrador of the King of Portugal). Farther south are the phrases Terra de corte real e de rey de portugall (Land of the Royal Court and of the King of Portugal) and Terra de pescaria (Land for Fishing). In the 1532 Wolfenbüttel map, believed to be the work of Diogo Ribeiro, along the coast of Greenland, the following legend was added: As he who first sighted it was a farmer from the Azores Islands, this name remains attached to that country. This is believed to be João Fernandes. For the first seven decades or so of the sixteenth century, the name Labrador was sometimes also applied to what is now known as Greenland. Labrador ("lavrador" in Portuguese) means husbandman or farmer of a tract of land (from "labor" in Latin) – the land of the labourer. European settlement was largely concentrated in coastal communities, particularly those south of St. Lewis and Cape Charles, and are among Canada's oldest European settlements.

In 1542, Basque mariners came ashore at a natural harbour on the northeast coast of the Strait of Belle Isle. They gave this "new land" its Latin name Terranova. A whaling station was set up around the bay, which they called Butus and is now named Red Bay after the red terracotta roof tiles they brought with them. A whaling ship, the San Juan, sank there in 1565 and was raised in 1978.

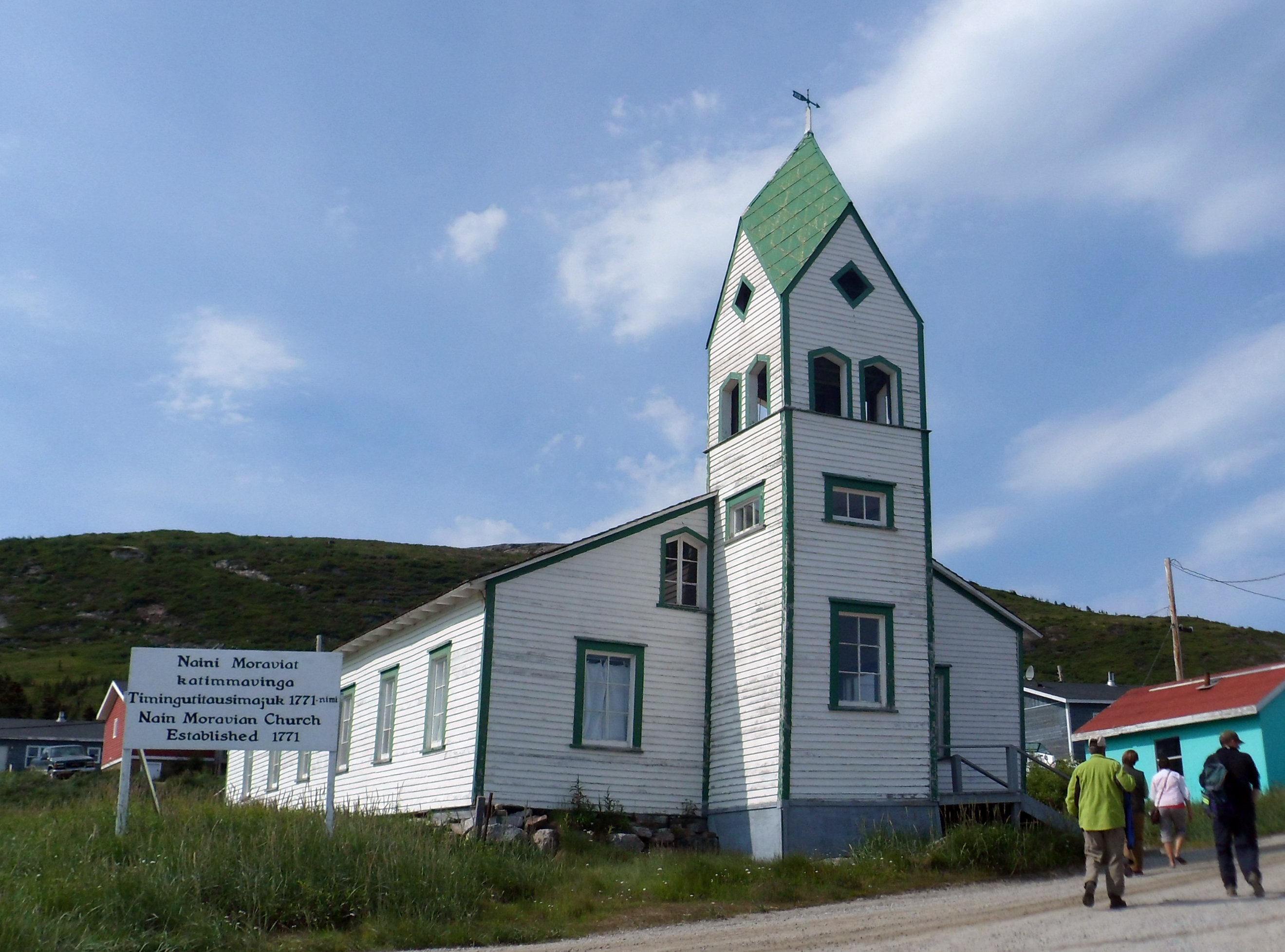
Nain was established in 1771 by Moravian missionaries

The Moravian Brethren of Herrnhut, Saxony, first came to the Labrador Coast in 1760 to minister to the migratory Inuit tribes there. They founded Nain, Okak, Hebron, Hopedale and Makkovik. Quite poor, both European and First Nations settlements along coastal Labrador came to benefit from cargo and relief vessels that were operated as part of the Grenfell Mission (see Wilfred Grenfell). Throughout the 20th century, coastal freighters and ferries operated initially by the Newfoundland Railway and later Canadian National Railway/CN Marine/Marine Atlantic became a critical lifeline for communities on the coast, which for the majority of that century did not have any road connection with the rest of North America.

Labrador was part of New France until the Seven Years' War. By the Treaty of Paris (1763), which ended the war, New France (including Labrador, though excluding the islands of Saint Pierre and Miquelon southwest of Newfoundland) was transferred to the British, who administered the northern portion of it as the Province of Quebec until splitting it in two in 1791, with Labrador located in Lower Canada. However, in 1809, the British Imperial government detached Labrador from Lower Canada for transfer to the separate, self-governing Newfoundland Colony.

=== 20th century ===
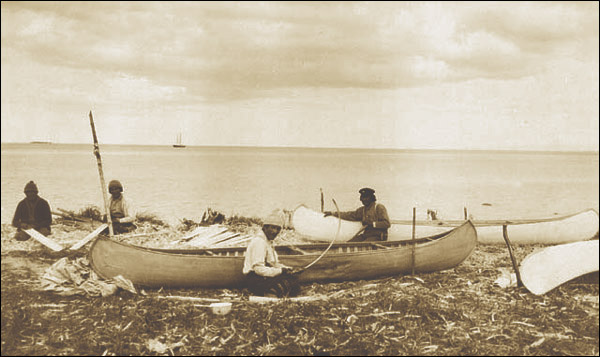
Innu near Sheshatshiu c. 1920

As part of Newfoundland since 1809, Labrador was still being disputed by Quebec until the British Privy Council resolved their border in 1927. In 1949, Newfoundland entered into confederation, becoming part of Canada.

Labrador played strategic roles during both World War II and the Cold War. In October 1943, a German U-boat crew installed an automated weather station on the northern tip of Labrador near Cape Chidley, code-named Weather Station Kurt; the installation of the equipment was the only-known armed German military operation on the North American mainland during the war. The station broadcast weather observations to the German navy for only a few days, but was not discovered until 1977 when a historian, working with the Canadian Coast Guard, identified its location and mounted an expedition to recover it. The station is now exhibited in the Canadian War Museum.

The Canadian government built a major air force base at Goose Bay, at the head of Lake Melville during the Second World War, a site selected because of its topography, access to the sea, defensible location, and minimal fog. During the Second World War and the Cold War, the base was also home to American, British, and later German, Dutch, and Italian detachments. Today, Serco, the company contracted to operate CFB Goose Bay is one of the largest employers for the community of Happy Valley-Goose Bay.

Additionally, both the Royal Canadian Air Force and United States Air Force built and operated a number of radar stations along coastal Labrador as part of the Pinetree Line, Mid-Canada Line and DEW Line systems. Today, the remaining stations are automated as part of the North Warning System; however, the military settlements during the early part of the Cold War surrounding these stations have largely continued as local Innu and Inuit populations have clustered near their port and airfield facilities.

During the first half of the 20th century, some of the largest iron ore deposits in the world were discovered in the western part of Labrador and adjacent areas of Quebec. Deposits at Mont Wright, Schefferville, Labrador City, and Wabush drove industrial development and human settlement in the area during the second half of the 20th century.

The present community of Labrador West is entirely a result of the iron ore mining activities in the region. The Iron Ore Company of Canada operates the Quebec North Shore and Labrador Railway to transport ore concentrate 578 km (359 mi) south to the port of Sept-Îles, Quebec, for shipment to steel mills in North America and elsewhere.

During the 1960s, the Churchill River (Labrador name: Grand River) was diverted at Churchill Falls, resulting in the flooding of an enormous area – today named the Smallwood Reservoir after Joey Smallwood, the first premier of Newfoundland. The flooding of the reservoir destroyed large areas of habitat for the threatened Woodland Caribou. A hydroelectric generating station was built in Labrador as well as a transmission line to the neighbouring province of Quebec.

Construction of a large hydroelectric dam project at Muskrat Falls began in 2012 by Nalcor Energy and the Province of Newfoundland. Muskrat Falls is 45 km (30 miles) west of Happy Valley-Goose Bay on the Grand River (Newfoundland name: Churchill River). A transmission line began construction in October 2014 and was completed in 2016 that delivers power down to the southern tip of Labrador and underwater across the Strait of Belle Isle to the Province of Newfoundland in 2018.

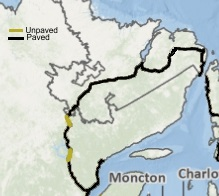
Route of the Trans-Labrador highway

From the 1970s to early 2000s, the Trans-Labrador Highway was built in stages to connect various inland communities with the North American highway network at Mont Wright, Quebec (which in turn is connected by a highway running north from Baie-Comeau, Quebec). A southern extension of this highway has opened in stages during the early 2000s and is resulting in significant changes to the coastal ferry system in the Strait of Belle Isle and southeastern Labrador. These "highways" are so called only because of their importance to the region; they would be better described as roads, and were not completely paved until July 2022.

A study on a fixed link to Newfoundland, in 2004, recommended that a tunnel under the Strait of Belle Isle, being a single railway that would carry cars, buses and trucks, was technologically the best option for such a link. However, the study also concluded that a fixed link was not economically viable. Conceivably, if built with federal aid, the 1949 terms of union would be amended to remove ferry service from Nova Scotia to Port aux Basques across the Cabot Strait.

Although a highway link has, as of December 2009, been completed across Labrador, this route is somewhat longer than a proposed Quebec North Shore highway that presently does not exist. Part of the "highway", Route 389, starting approximately 212 kilometres (132 mi) from Baie-Comeau to 482 kilometres (300 mi), is of an inferior alignment, and from there to 570 kilometres (350 mi), the provincial border, is an accident-prone section notorious for its poor surface and sharp curves. Quebec in April 2009 announced major upgrades to Route 389 to be carried out.

Route 389 and the Trans-Labrador Highway were added to Canada's National Highway System in September 2005.

Labrador constitutes a federal electoral district electing one member to the House of Commons of Canada. Due to its size, distinct nature, and large Aboriginal population, Labrador has one seat despite having the smallest population of any electoral district in Canada. Formerly, Labrador was part of a riding that included part of the Island of Newfoundland. Labrador is divided into four provincial electoral districts in the Newfoundland and Labrador House of Assembly.

== Geography ==
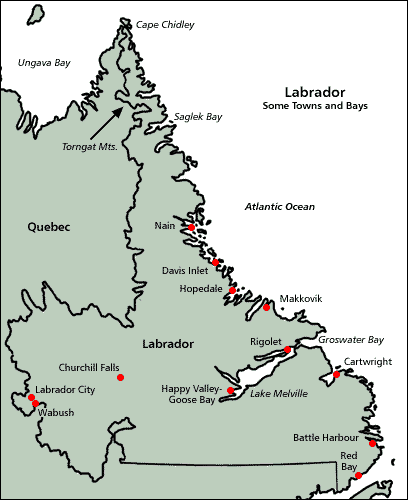
Map of Labrador

Labrador has a roughly triangular shape that encompasses the easternmost section of the Canadian Shield, a sweeping geographical region of thin soil and abundant mineral resources. Its western border with Quebec is the drainage divide of the Labrador Peninsula. Lands that drain into the Atlantic Ocean are part of Labrador, while lands that drain into Hudson Bay are part of Quebec. Labrador's extreme northern tip, at 60°22′N, shares a short border with Nunavut on Killiniq Island. Labrador also has a maritime border with Greenland. Northern Labrador's climate is classified as polar, while Southern Labrador's climate is classified as subarctic.

Labrador can be divided into four geographical regions: the North Coast, Central Labrador, Western Labrador, and the South Coast. Each of those regions is described below.

=== North Coast ===
From Cape Chidley to Hamilton Inlet, the long, thin, northern tip of Labrador holds the Torngat Mountains, named after an Inuit spirit believed to inhabit them. The mountains stretch along the coast from Port Manvers to Cape Chidley, the northernmost point of Labrador. The Torngat Mountain range is also home to Mount Caubvick, the highest point in the province. This area is predominantly Inuit, with the exception of a small Innu community, Natuashish. The North Coast is the most isolated region of Labrador, with snowmobiles, boats, and planes being the only modern modes of transportation. The largest community in this region is Nain.

==== Nunatsiavut ====
Nunatsiavut is an Inuit self-government region in Labrador created on June 23, 2005. The settlement area comprises the majority of Labrador's North Coast, while the land-use area also includes land farther to the interior and in Central Labrador. Nain is the administrative centre.

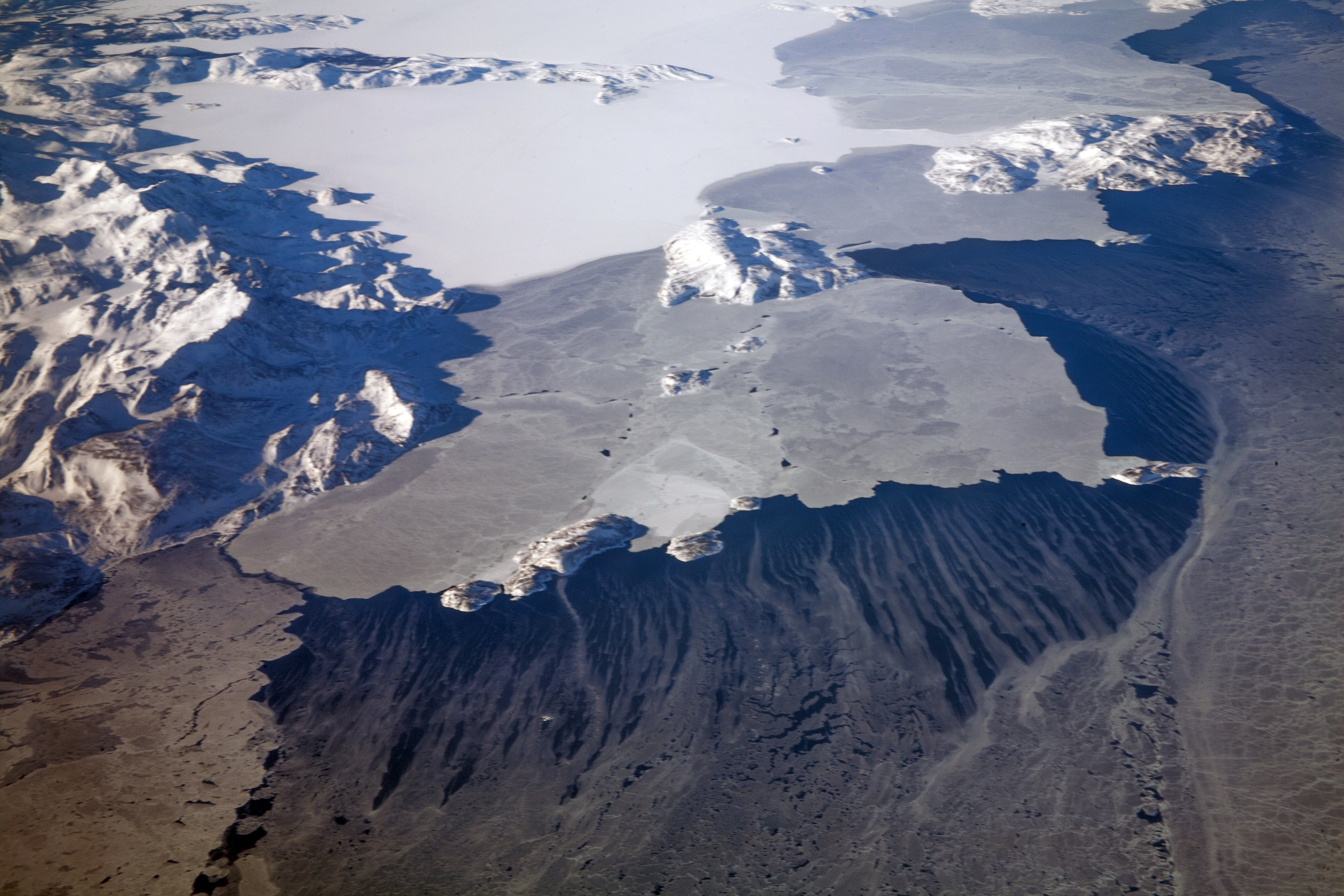
Icy Labrador coast and Kiglapait Mountains on the north coast of Labrador

=== Central Labrador ===
Central Labrador extends from the shores of Lake Melville into the interior. It contains the Churchill River, the largest river in Labrador and one of the largest in Canada. The hydroelectric dam at Churchill Falls is the second-largest underground power station in the world. Most of the supply is bought by Hydro-Québec under a long-term contract. The Lower Churchill Project will develop the remaining potential of the river and supply it to provincial consumers. Known as "the heart of the Big Land", the area's population comprises people from all groups and regions of Labrador.

Central Labrador is also home to Happy Valley-Goose Bay. Once a refuelling point for plane convoys to Europe during World War II, CFB Goose Bay is now operated as a NATO tactical flight training site. It was an alternate landing zone for the United States' Space Shuttle. Other major communities in the area are North West River and the large Innu reserve known as Sheshatshiu.

=== Western Labrador ===
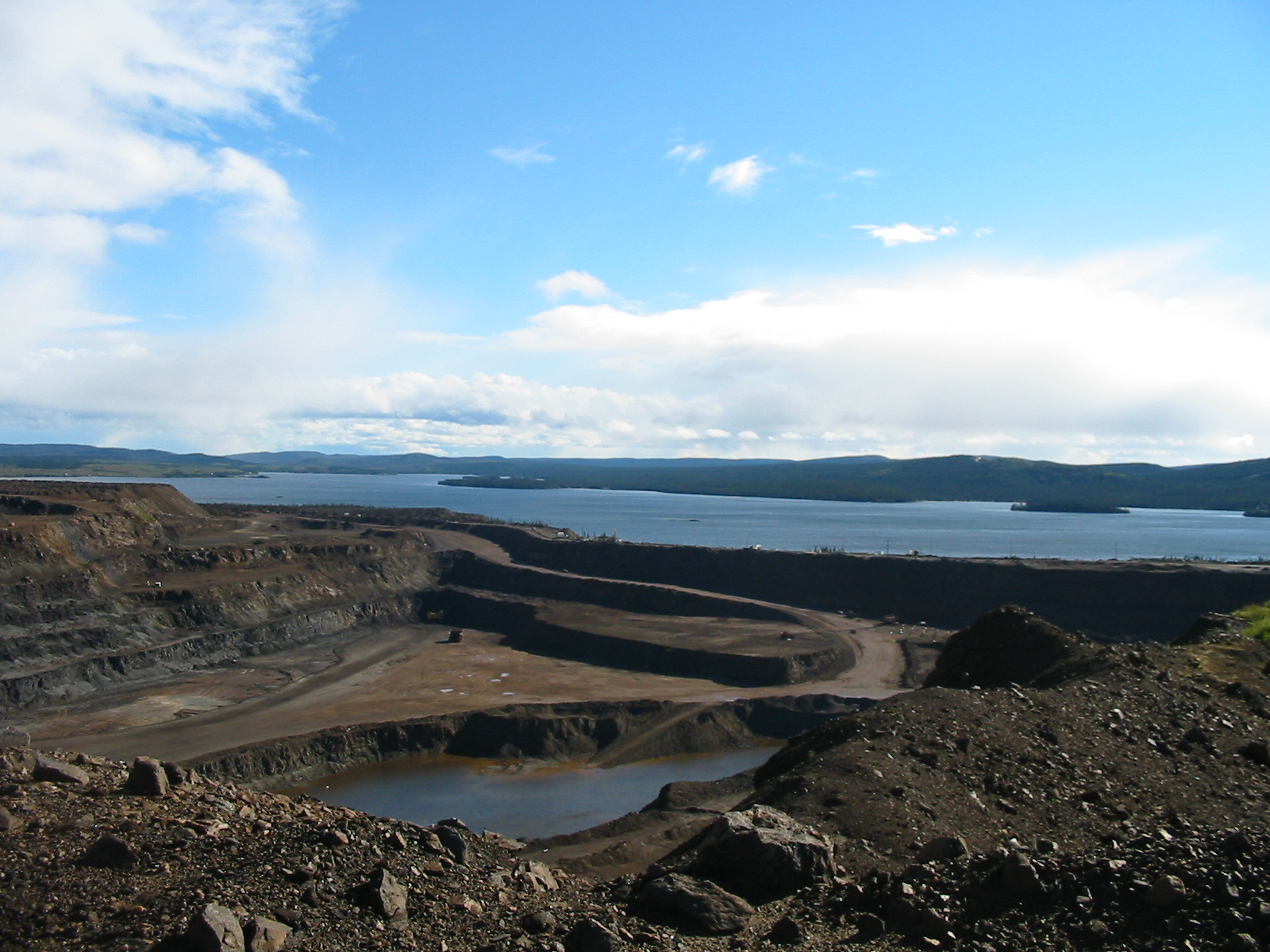
Open pit iron mine in Labrador West

The highlands above the Churchill Falls were once an ancient hunting ground for the Innu First Nations and settled trappers of Labrador. After the construction of the hydroelectric dam at Churchill Falls in 1970, the Smallwood Reservoir has flooded much of the old hunting land—submerging several grave sites and trapping cabins in the process.

Western Labrador is also home to the Iron Ore Company of Canada, which operates a large iron ore mine in Labrador City. Together with the small community of Wabush, the two towns are known as "Labrador West".

=== South Coast ===
==== NunatuKavut ====
From Hamilton Inlet to Cape St. Charles/St. Lewis, NunatuKavut is the territory of the NunatuKavummiut or Central-Southern Labrador Inuit (formerly known as the Labrador Métis). It includes portions of Central and Western Labrador, but more NunatuKavummiut reside in its South Coast portion: it is peppered with tiny Inuit fishing communities, of which Cartwright is the largest.

==== Labrador Straits ====
From Cape Charles to the Quebec–Labrador coastal border, the Straits are known for their Labrador seagrass (as is NunatuKavut) and the multitude of icebergs that pass by the coast via the Labrador Current.

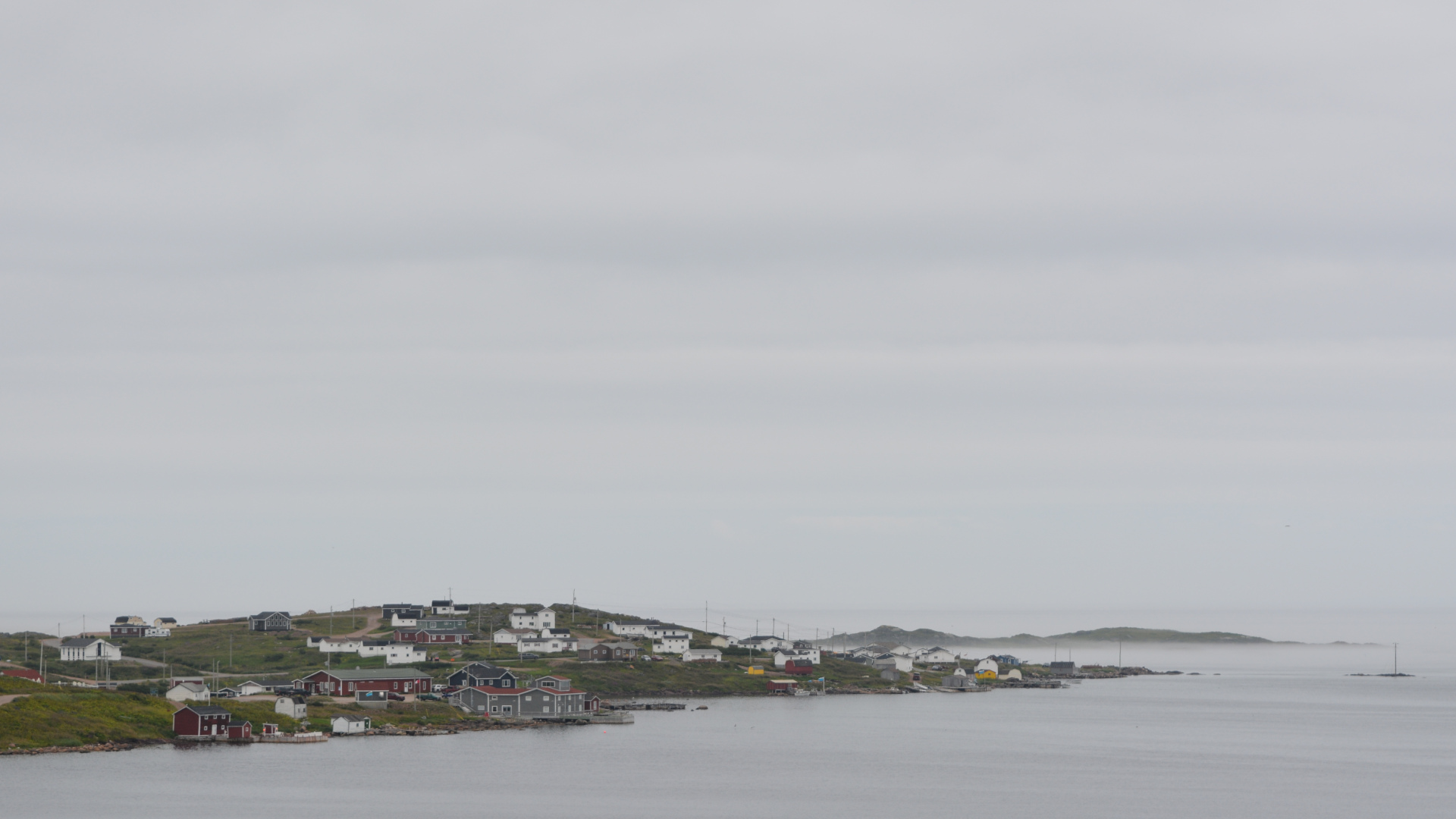
Red Bay, Labrador

Red Bay is known as one of the best examples of a preserved 16th-century Basque whaling station. It is also the location of four 16th-century Spanish galleons. The lighthouse at Point Amour is the second-largest lighthouse in Canada. MV Qajaq, a passenger ferry between the mainland and St. Barbe on the island of Newfoundland, is based in Blanc Sablon, Quebec, near the Labrador border. L'Anse-au-Loup is the largest town on the Labrador Straits. L'Anse-au-Clair is a small town on the Labrador side of the border.

=== Time zones of Labrador ===
Most of Labrador (from Cartwright north and west) uses Atlantic Time (UTC−4 in winter, UTC−3 in summer). The southeastern tip nearest Newfoundland uses Newfoundland Time (UTC−3:30 in winter, UTC−2:30 in summer) to stay co-ordinated with the more populous part of the province.

=== Climate of Labrador ===
Most of Labrador has a subarctic climate (Dfc), but northern Labrador has a tundra climate (ET) and Happy Valley - Goose Bay has a humid continental (Dfb) microclimate. Summers are typically cool to mild across Labrador and very rainy, and usually last from late June to the end of August. Autumn is generally short, lasting only a couple of weeks and is typically cool and cloudy. Winters are long, cold, and extremely snowy, due to the Icelandic Low. Springtime most years does not arrive until late April, with the last snow fall usually falling during early June. Labrador is a very cloudy place, with sunshine levels staying relatively low during spring and summer due to the amount of rain and clouds, before sharply dropping off during September as winter draws nearer.

=== Natural features ===
Labrador is home to a number of flora and fauna species. Most of the Upper Canadian and Lower Hudsonian mammalian species are found in Labrador. Notably the polar bear (Ursus maritimus) reaches the southeast of Labrador on its seasonal movements.

== Boundary dispute ==
The Old Harry oil field, on the boundary between Quebec and Newfoundland and Labrador

In 1809, Labrador was transferred from Lower Canada to the Newfoundland Colony, but the inland boundary of Labrador had never been precisely stated. Newfoundland argued it extended to the height of land, while Canada, stressing the historical use of the term "Coasts of Labrador", argued the boundary was 1 statute mile (1.6 km) inland from the high-tide mark. As Canada and Newfoundland were separate Dominions, but both within the British Empire, the matter was referred to the Judicial Committee of the Privy Council (in London). Their decision set the Labrador boundary mostly along the coastal watershed, with part being defined by the 52nd parallel north. One of Newfoundland's conditions for joining Confederation in 1949 was that this boundary be entrenched in the Canadian constitution. While this border has not been formally accepted by the Quebec government, the Henri Dorion Commission (Commission d'étude sur l'intégrité du territoire du Québec) concluded in the early 1970s that Quebec no longer has a legal claim to Labrador.

In 2001, Parti Québécois cabinet ministers Jacques Brassard and Joseph Facal erroneously reasserted that Quebec has never recognized the 1927 border:

Les ministres rappellent qu'aucun gouvernement québécois n'a reconnu formellement le tracé de la frontière entre le Québec et Terre-Neuve dans la péninsule du Labrador selon l'avis rendu par le comité judiciaire du Conseil privé de Londres en 1927. Pour le Québec, cette frontière n'a donc jamais été définitivement arrêtée. [The ministers reiterate that no Quebec government has ever formally recognised the drawing of the border between Quebec and Newfoundland in the Labrador peninsula according to the opinion rendered by the London Judicial Committee of the Privy Council in 1927. For Quebec, this border has thus never been definitively defined.]

In 2023, Jordan Brown, a Newfoundland and Labrador politician, criticized the Bloc Québécois for exhibiting a map of Quebec on which the whole of Labrador was depicted as part of Quebec.

== Self-government ==
A Royal Commission in 2002 determined that there is some public pressure from Labradorians to break from Newfoundland and become a separate province or territory.

=== Indigenous self-government ===
After decades of negotiation with the provincial and federal governments, the Nunatsiavut region of northern and northeastern Labrador was created in 2005 as an autonomous region with its own elected Assembly and executive drawn from members of the region's Assembly. Some of the Innu nation would have the entirety of Labrador become a homeland for them, much as Nunavut and Nunatsiavut is for the Inuit, as a good portion of Nitassinan falls within Labrador's borders; a 1999 resolution of the Assembly of First Nations claimed Labrador as a homeland for the Innu and demanded recognition in any further constitutional negotiations regarding the region.

Labrador's Innu became status Indians under the Indian Act in 2002. Natuashish became a federal Indian reserve in 2003. Sheshatshiu became a federal reserve in 2006.

The Labrador Inuit Association had filed a land claim for portions of Labradorian land in 1977. In 1988, the Labrador Inuit Association, the government of the province of Newfoundland, and the government of Canada began negotiations based on the land claim. An agreement-in-principle was achieved in 2001, and on May 26, 2004, the agreement was ratified by over 75% of eligible voters subject to the land claim. On January 22, 2005, the Inuit of Nunatsiavut signed the Labrador Inuit Lands Claims Agreement with the federal and provincial governments covering 72,520 km^{2} (28,000 sq mi) of land, including the entire northern salient of Labrador north of Nain as well as a portion of the Atlantic coast south of there. The agreement also includes 44,030 km^{2} (17,000 sq mi) of sea rights. Although the Inuit will not own the whole area, they were granted special rights related to traditional land use, and they will own 15,800 km^{2} (6,100 sq mi) designated Labrador Inuit Lands. The agreement also establishes the Torngat Mountains National Park in the northern area of the land claim. The agreement was ratified by the Labrador Inuit, the General Assembly of Newfoundland and Labrador, and the Parliament of Canada, where it received Royal Assent on June 23, 2005, whereafter elections would be held for the Nunatsiavut Assembly and self-government would begin.

In the late 1970s, the Labrador Metis Association was created by the inhabitants of Labrador's southern coast to gain recognition as a distinct ethnocultural group, as at the time despite a pre-existing treaty protected under the constitution, the "Inuit-Metis" were considered to be merely the descendants of Inuit who had joined Western society. Little was known about the history of the "Inuit-Metis" of the time. In 2006, the Labrador Metis Association initiated a project with Memorial University of Newfoundland to better understand their past through the Community-University Research Association (CURA). Following research by CURA, the "Labrador Metis" were understood to be a continuation of the Inuit of southern Labrador. In 2010, the Labrador Metis Association changed its name to reflect their newly discovered heritage, and became the NunatuKavut Community Council. The Southern Inuit of NunatuKavut, who are also seeking self-government, have their land claim before the Government of Canada. The Government of Newfoundland and Labrador refuses to recognise or negotiate with the Inuit of NunatuKavut until their claim has been accepted by the Government of Canada.

== Demographics ==
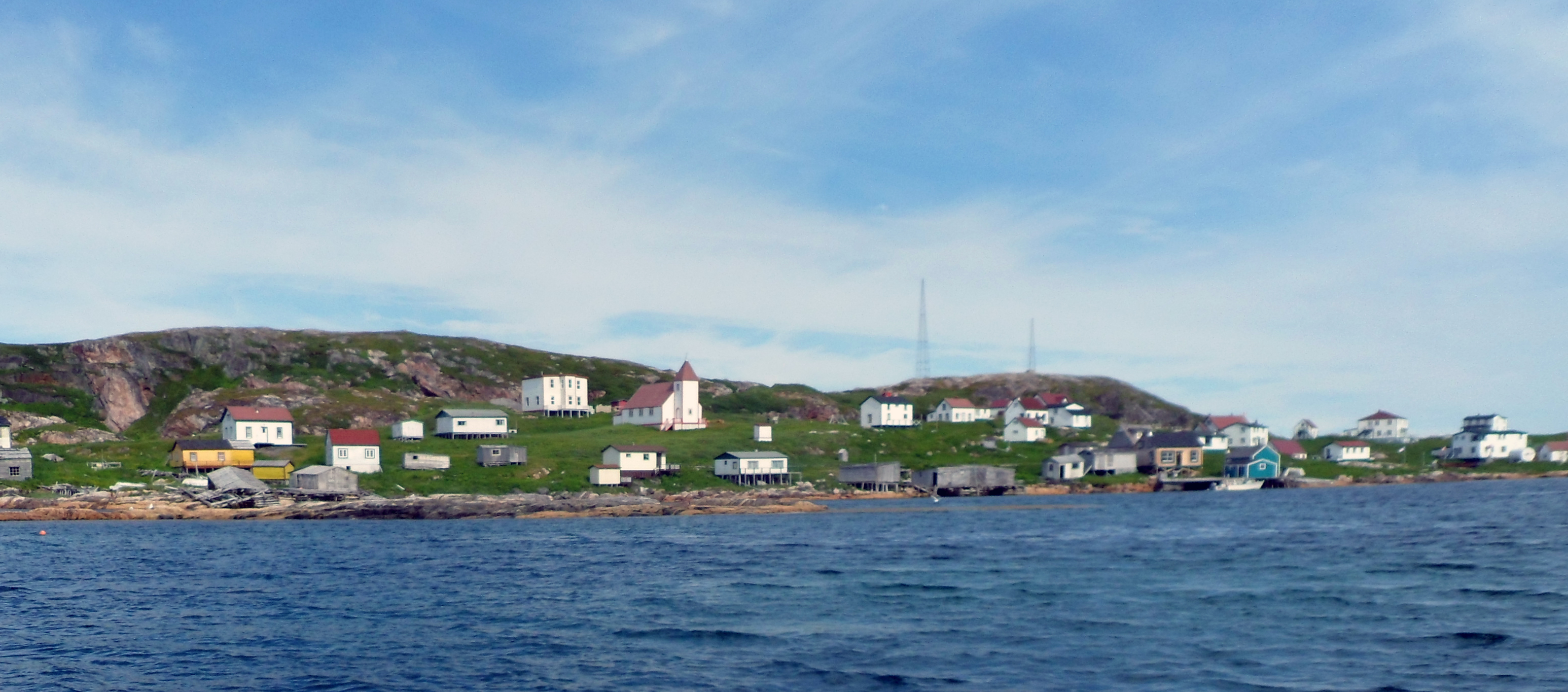
Battle Harbour, traditional outport fishing community

The Labrador region, with its 26,655 population, is lower than any of the Northern Canada territories, Yukon, Northwest Territories and Nunavut. Newfoundland Island contains the majority of the population of the province of Newfoundland and Labrador.

=== Communities ===
The municipalities of Labrador are mainly under 1,000 in population.

Population of largest communities in Labrador
Town	2021
Happy Valley-Goose Bay	8,040
Labrador City	7,412
Wabush	1,964
Sheshatshiu	1,410
Nain	1,204
Natuashish	856
Churchill Falls	732
L'Anse-au-Loup	692
Agvituk	596
North West River	560
Cartwright	439
Port Hope Simpson	403
Forteau	377
Makkovik	365
Rigolet	327
Mary's Harbour	312
Charlottetown	292
L'Anse au Clair	219
Postville	188
St. Lewis	181
Red Bay	142
West St. Modeste	102
Black Tickle	87
Pinware	64
Lodge Bay	61
Capstan Island	55
Mud Lake	54
Pinsent's Arm	43
Norman's Bay	15
Paradise River	5

=== Composition ===
Demographic Factors (2021 Census)
Factor	Labrador Census Division 10 (excludes Nunatsiavut-Nain)	Labrador Census Division 11 (Nunatsiavut-Nain)	Canada
Population	24,332	2,323	36,991,981
Male/Female split	50.7%/49.3%	50.0%/50.0%	49.3/50.7%
Median age (years)	39.2	32.8	41.6
Median household income (2020)	$115,000	$77,500	$84,000
Employment insurance benefits (2020)	3.4%	6.8%	1.4%

According to the 2011 Census, Labrador was 55.1% White, 18.5% Inuit, 15.6% Metis, and 8.6% First Nations (Innu).

== See also ==
- Akami−Uapishkᵘ−KakKasuak−Mealy Mountains National Park Reserve
- Barren Bay
- Black Bear Bay
- Caplin Bay
- Churchill River (Atlantic)
- Central Mineral Belt, Labrador
- Hinchinbrook Bay
- Labradorite
- Landsat Island
- Newfoundland–Labrador fixed link
- Voisey's Bay Mine
