= UTC−03:30 =

Time zone

- Time zone
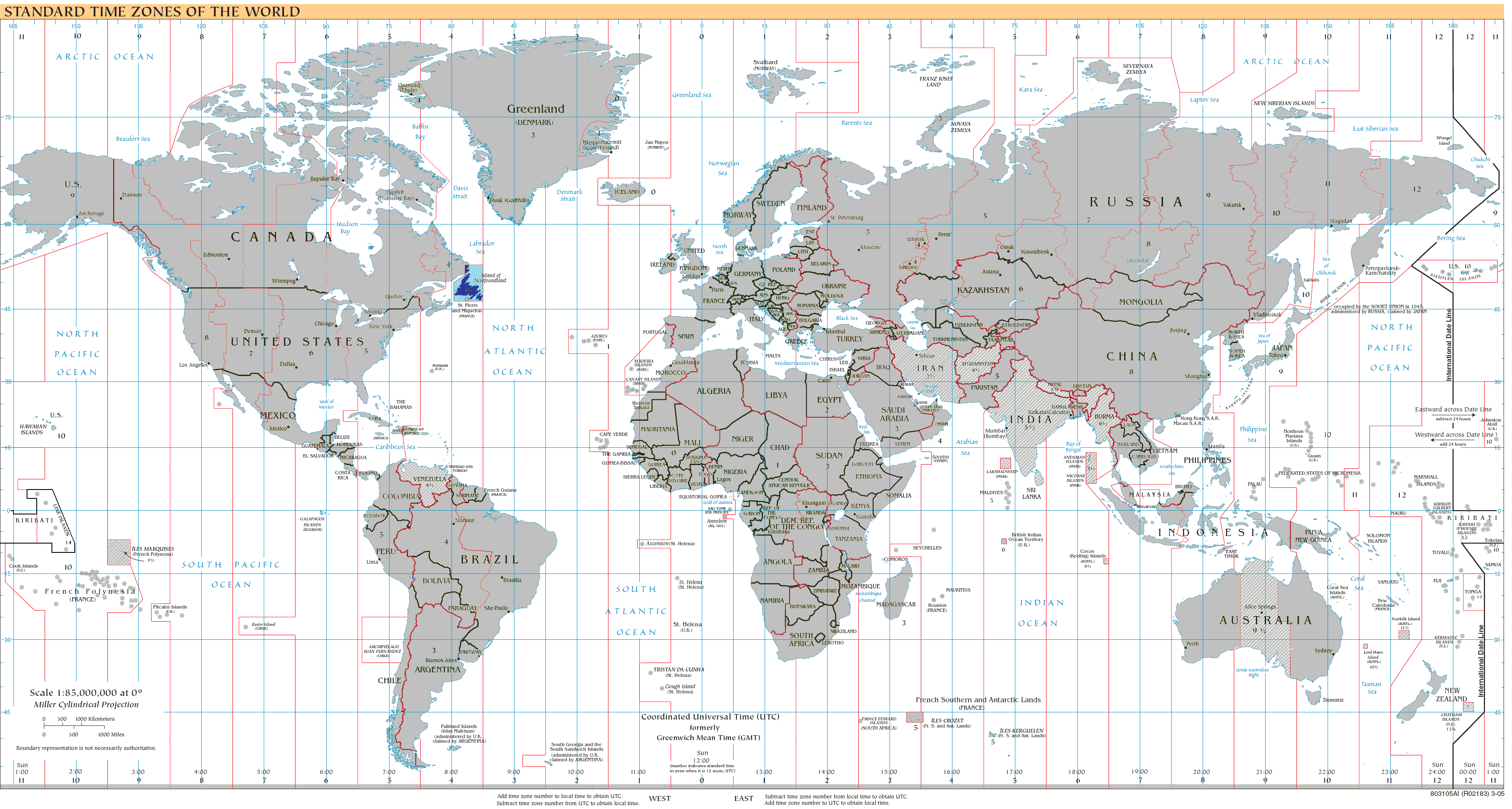
- World map with the time zone highlighted

UTC offset
- UTC: UTC−03:30

Current time
- 20:11, 23 August 2026 UTC−03:30 [refresh]

Central meridian
- 52.5 degrees W

Date-time group
- P*

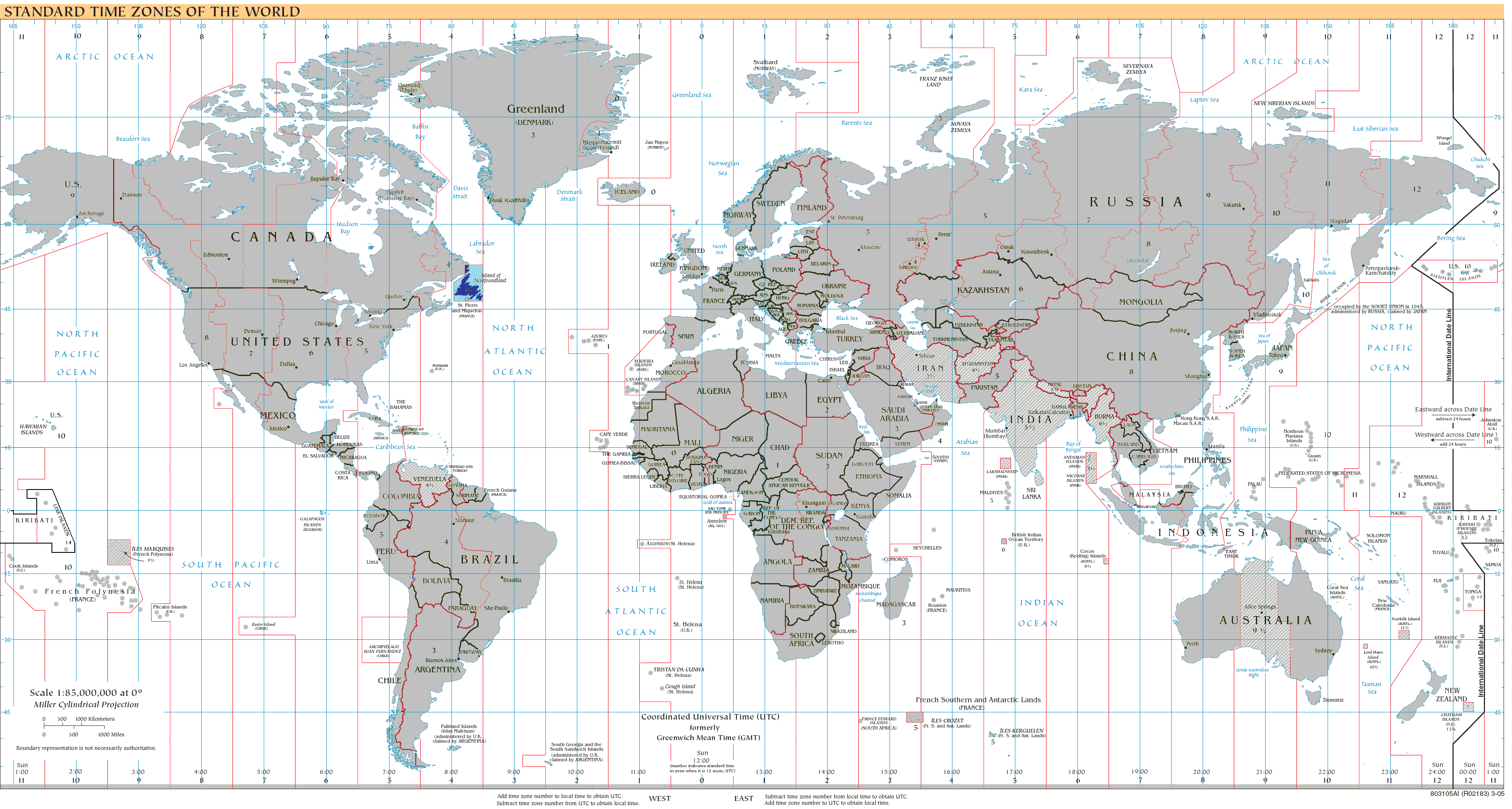
UTC−03:30: blue (December), orange (June), yellow (year-round), light blue (sea areas)

UTC−03:30 is an identifier for a time offset from UTC of −03:30. It is used in the Canadian province of Newfoundland and Labrador as Newfoundland Time Zone.

== As standard time (Northern Hemisphere winter) ==
Principal city: St. John's

=== North America ===
- Canada – Newfoundland Time Zone
  - Newfoundland and Labrador
    - Labrador
      - The area between L'Anse-au-Clair and Norman Bay
    - Newfoundland

== Historical use ==
It was also used in Uruguay as standard time between 1 April 1924 and 14 March 1942, with DST being a half-hour offset with clocks set to UTC−03:00, and in Suriname between 1 October 1945 and 1 October 1984.
