= Central Labrador =

Most populous region of Labrador, Canada

Central Labrador is the most populous region of Labrador, Canada, that extends from the shores of Lake Melville into the interior. It is also home to Happy Valley – Goose Bay, the largest community in Labrador.

== Geography ==
It contains the Churchill River, the largest river in Labrador and one of the largest in Canada. The hydroelectric dam at Churchill Falls is the second largest underground power station in the world, but most of the supply is bought by Hydro-Québec under a long-term contract. The Lower Churchill Project will develop the remaining potential of the river and supply it to provincial consumers.

== Cities ==
Known as "the heart of the Big Land", the area's population comprises people from all groups and regions of Labrador. Central Labrador is also home to Happy Valley – Goose Bay, the largest community in Labrador. Once a refueling point for plane convoys to Europe in World War II, CFB Goose Bay is now a NATO low-level tactical flight training site. CFB Goose Bay saw a reduction of NATO low-level tactical flight training in the decade 1996–2005, and the town faced an uncertain future as the federal government reduced the number of permanent Royal Canadian Air Force personnel to fewer than 100 all-ranks. The last NATO nations to use CFB Goose Bay for flight training, Germany and Italy, did not renew their leases after terminating in early 2006.

The runway at Happy Valley-Goose Bay was also an alternative, but unused, landing site for the now-decommissioned NASA Space Shuttle, because of its size and length.

== Transportation ==
Central Labrador can be accessed by the highways 389 and 500 leading from Baie Comeau, Quebec into areas in West Labrador, such as Labrador City and Churchill Falls.

Air access is provided by Air Canada Jazz or Provincial Airlines from St. John's, Deer Lake, Halifax, or Montreal.

Central Labrador is connected by the Trans-Labrador Highway with Labrador City and Baie-Comeau in Quebec. The road was extended south to link with an existing road from the Blanc Sablon-St Barbe ferry. It opened in December 2009.

== See also ==
- Churchill River (Atlantic)
- Central Mineral Belt, Labrador
- Division No. 10, Newfoundland and Labrador
- Newfoundland-Labrador fixed link
- Newfoundland and Labrador Route 520
- Quebec Route 138
- Sheshatshiu
