= NunatuKavut =

Nunatuĸavut
- Proposed autonomous area
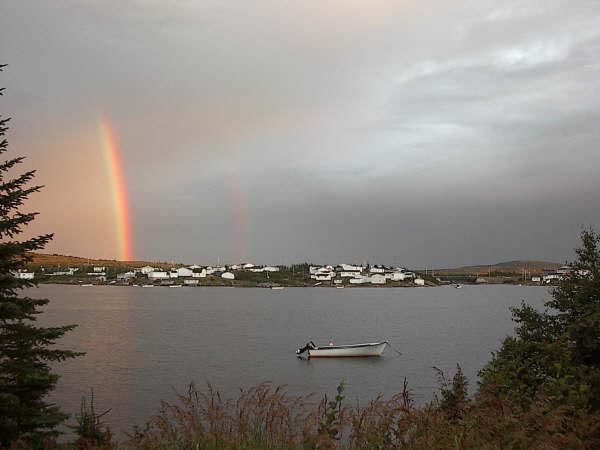
- The village of Mary's Harbour, in Southern Labrador

- Flag
- Country: Canada
- Province: Newfoundland and Labrador
- Capital: Vâli, Labrador

Government
  - Type: Proposed parliamentary democracy within the parliamentary system of Canada
  - President: Todd Russell (since 2012)

Population (2007)
  - Total: 2,345
- Demonym: NunatuKavummiut
- Time zone: UTC−04:00 (AST)
- Postal code prefix: A0P
- ISO 3166 code: NL
- Federal riding: Labrador
- Provincial riding: Cartwright-L'Anse au Clair and Lake Melville
- Website: NunatuKavut.ca

- People: NunatuKavummiut
- Language: Inuttitut; Inuit Sign Language (Uukturausingit)

NunatuKavut (Inuktitut: ᓄᓇᑐᑲᕗᑦ, "Our Ancient Land") is a proposed NunatuKavummiut territory in central and southern Labrador. Previous submissions by the Nunatuĸavummiut (as the Labrador Métis Nation) included a secondary claim as far north as Nain, the northernmost community in Nunatsiavut.

The NunatuKavut Community Council (NCC) says that the NunatuKavut claim lands correspond to the historic land-use of the Southern Inuit. The NCC is considered an Indigenous collective (Note: The group has been described as an Aboriginal group and Aboriginal community by the Court of Appeal of Newfoundland and Labrador, and as an Indigenous collective by a memorandum of understanding signed with the federal government. While recognized by the federal government as eligible to apply for Indigenous rights, the status of Indigenous collective does not grant such rights itself.) which represents the descendants of mixed Inuit-European people from central and southern Labrador. While both the Supreme Court of Newfoundland and Labrador and the Royal Commission on Aboriginal Peoples have concluded that the NCC represents a people with a credible but unproven claim to Indigenous rights, at least three land claim submissions have been unsuccessful since it first applied in 1991.

The NunatuKavut Community Council's claims have been opposed by other Indigenous groups in the region. The Innu Nation also includes portions of the proposed NunatuKavut territory in its own land claim. The NCC signed a memorandum of understanding in 2019 with the Canadian government, but this in itself does not confer any Indigenous rights.

In September 2026, Crown-Indigenous Relations and Northern Affairs Canada (CIRNAC) terminated the 2019 Memorandum of Understanding (MOU) and rights-recognition process with the NCC, concluding that their historical claims did not meet the legal criteria for Section 35 Aboriginal rights under the Constitution Act, 1982.

== History ==
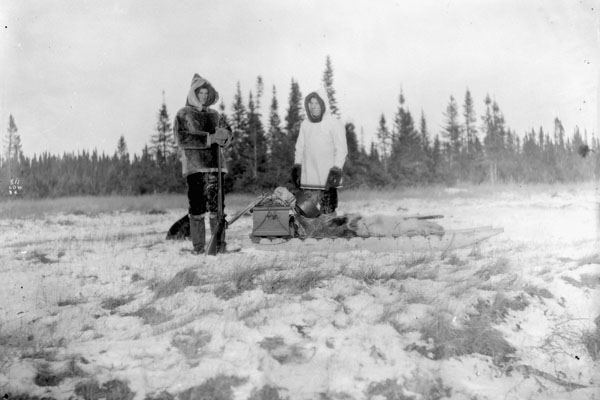
North West River in 1894

=== Early European contact ===
The area was known as Markland in Greenlandic Norse and its inhabitants were known as the Skræling though there is considerable debate as to whether contact was made with Thule culture or Dorset culture. The Inuit and their ancestors had thus been using the coastal areas of south Labrador, at least on a seasonal basis, well before first contact with Europeans.

Archeological studies have also confirmed widespread Inuit occupation of the Sandwich Bay area over several centuries. These findings confirm the continued presence of Inuit, living year-round in the areas south of Hamilton Inlet, from the early to mid-16th century until at least the late 19th century.

The earliest recorded contact between Inuit and post-Nordic Europeans occurred in 1501, when the Anglo-Azorean expedition visited Labrador and took three Inuit to England. These Inuit were presented to Henry VII of England by Sebastian Cabot and were described as "clothed in beastes skinnes, who eat raw flesh". Ship records indicate explorers did not encounter Inuit in the southernmost portion of Labrador at the time, but the remains of sod houses and tent rings in Sandwich Bay suggest Inuit settlements already existed year-round in the coastal areas around this time.

In 1543, Basque whalers encountered Inuit in the Strait of Belle Isle with subsequent trade and conflict attested between these groups throughout the Basque occupation. The finding of historic Roman Catholic documents detailing Inuit-Europeans with Iberian names may indicate some unions occurred between these early visitors and the Indigenous people.

In 1586, the first written evidence of Inuit settlements in the area was recorded, when a crew of explorers led by John Davies were attacked by Inuit living on the outer islands near Sandwich Bay.

Inuit expansion throughout southern Labrador occurred between the 1600s and 1700s and extended as far south as the Côte-Nord. In 1652, an Inuit community was recorded in what is now the Côte-Nord region of Quebec. In 1659, Jacques Fremin described Cape St. Charles as an Inuit community. Louis Fornel named the area from Alexis Bay to Hamilton Inlet the "Coste des Eskimaux" in 1743 and claimed there were Inuit living around St. Michael's Bay ("Baye des Meniques"), Hawke Bay, Martin Bay and Hamilton Inlet. By 1750 Inuit no longer occupied the Côte-Nord, but were still living in southern Labrador and visited Chateau Bay for several more decades.

One well-studied sod house in Sandwich Bay was built in the mid- to late-19th century by an Englishman, Charles Williams, and his Scots-Inuit wife, Mary. The house exhibited both European and Inuit customs, and appears to have been inhabited until at least 1915.

Map with the location of the main NunatuKavut communities

=== Post-1763: Creation of Labrador and European contact ===
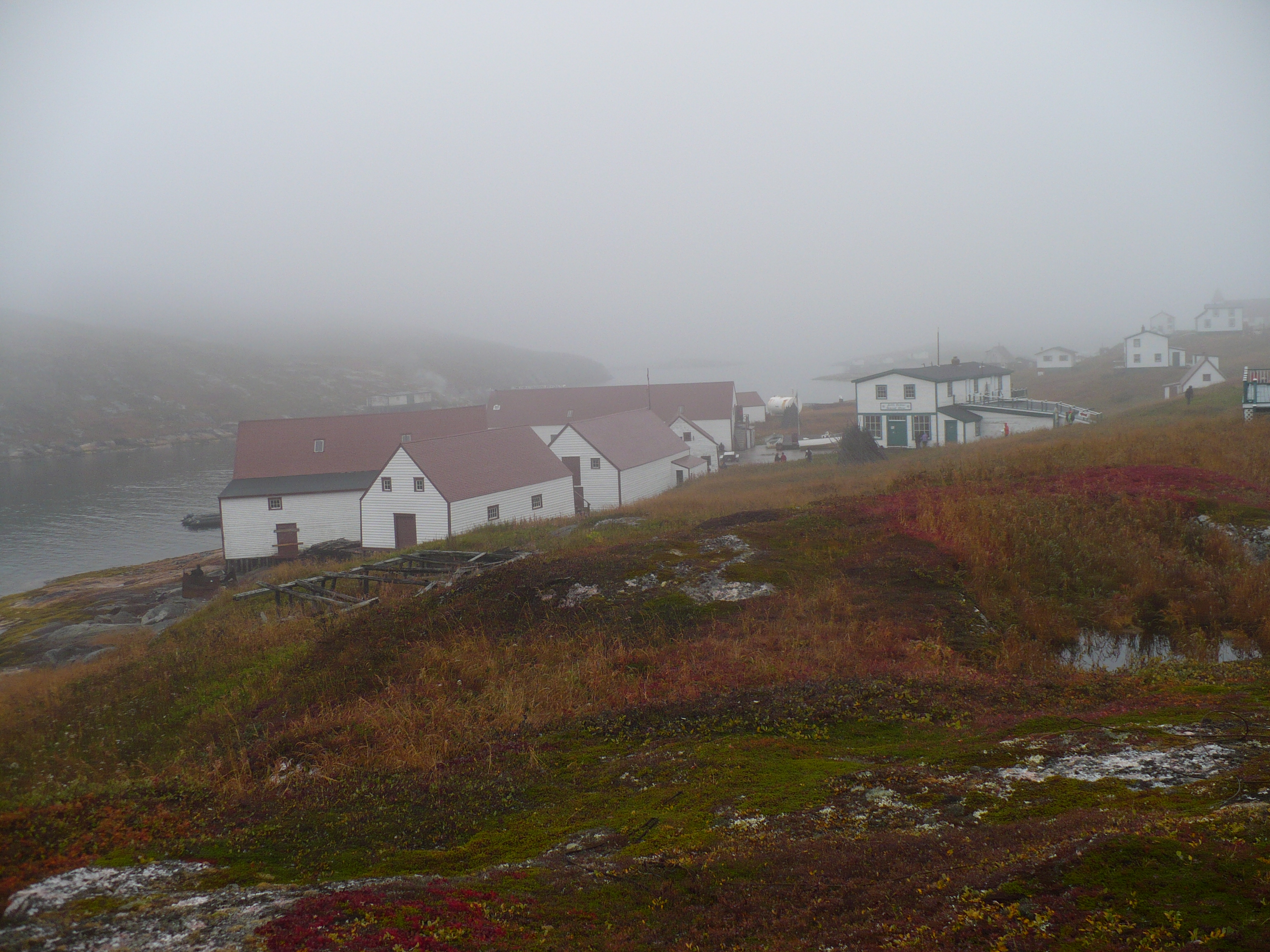
Battle Harbour, a resettled community near Mary's Harbour

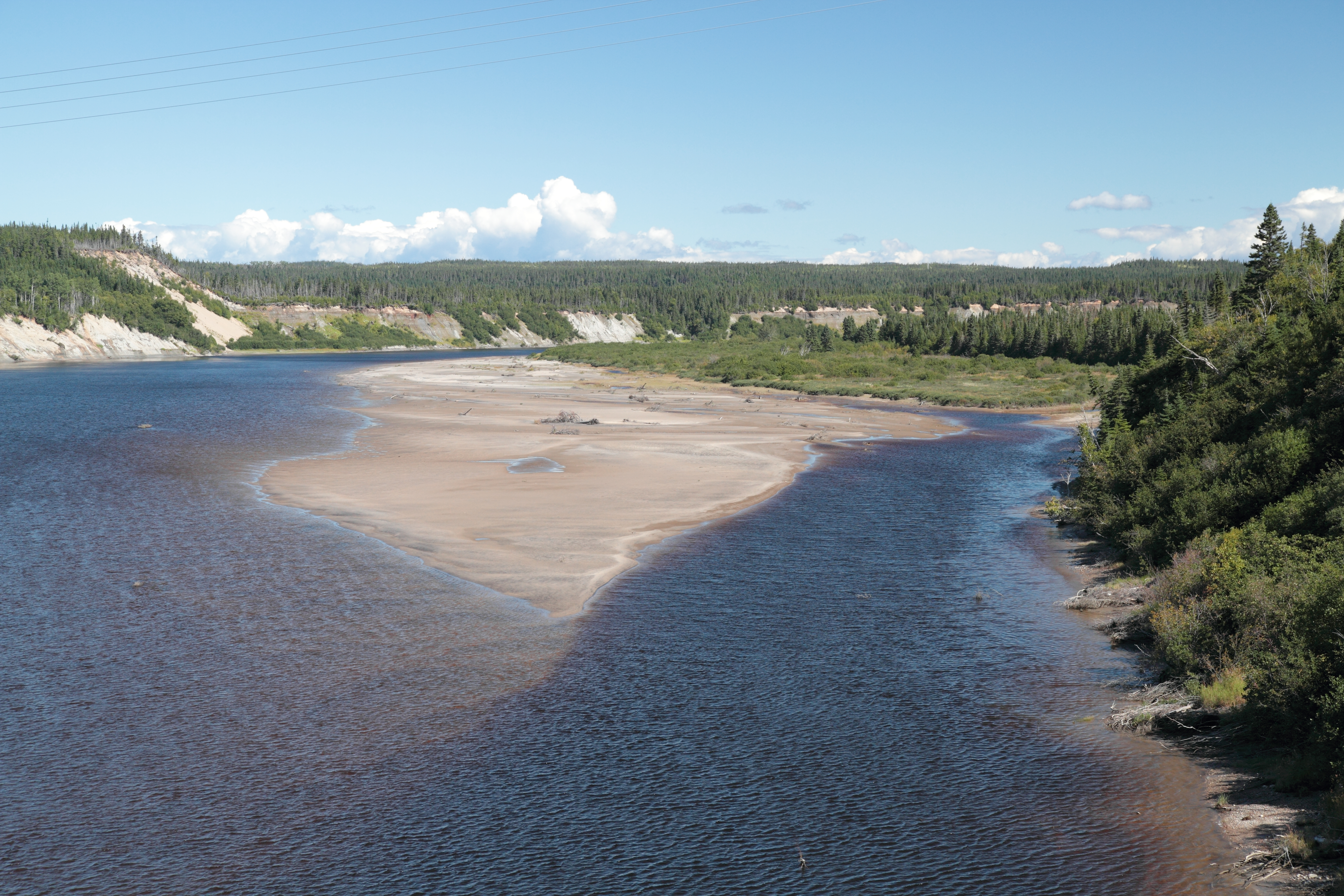
St. John's River (now Rivière-Saint-Jean, Quebec)

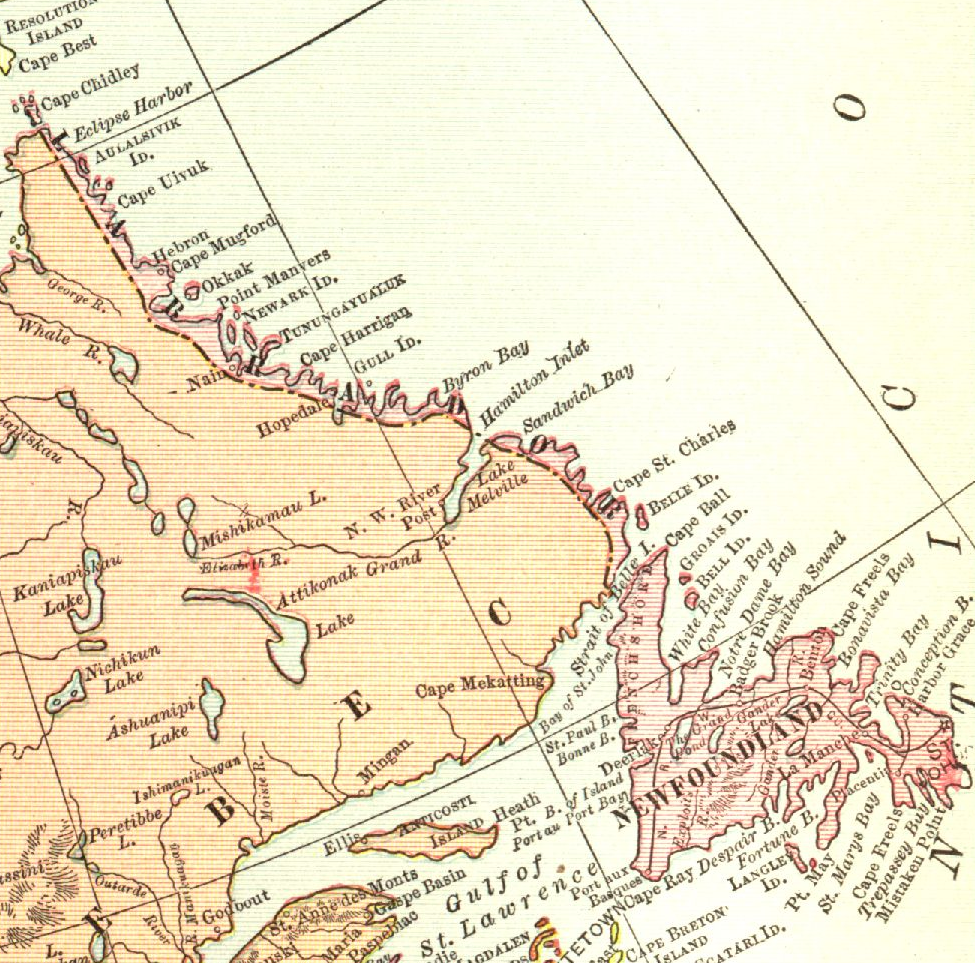
Labrador's boundary according to the Canadian government before 1927.

In 1763, Labrador was ceded to the Colony of Newfoundland. It included coastal area between the St. John's River and Cape Chidley and was meant as extra fishing grounds for Newfoundland fishermen. Labrador has been created using territory from the French colony of New France and the British colony of Rupert's Land. The inland boundary of Labrador was undefined until 1927, so Canada claimed the interior of Labrador as part of Quebec and the Northwest Territories while Newfoundland claimed that Labrador extended far inland. Labrador was ceded back to New France (now Lower Canada) and Rupert's Land in 1791 but then in 1809 it rejoined Newfoundland. In 1825 Blanc-Sablon and territory to the west was ceded to Lower Canada however this region (Le Golfe-du-Saint-Laurent Regional County Municipality) remains culturally close to NunatuKavut.

In 1764, Jens Haven arrived at Quirpon, Newfoundland and to Chateau Bay. He was a missionary from the Moravian Church. Haven learned the Inuit language and explained to them that the Colony of Newfoundland wished to enter a peaceful relationship with them. Haven had previously worked in Greenland which is where he learned the Greenlandic language (which is a similar language to the Inuttitut language spoken by Labradorian Inuit). The Moravian Church set up missionary posts in northern Labrador since the British hoped to colonize the south. They restricted access by Europeans to territory between Cape Chidley and Cape Harrison which created a cultural divide between the Inuit of the north and the Inuit of the south.

On 21 August 1765, Labradorian Inuit reportedly signed a "Peace and Friendship Treaty" with Newfoundland Governor Hugh Palliser, on behalf of the British, in Chateau Bay. Scholars currently disagree about whether the treaty was signed by Inuit permanently resident in the south or northern Inuit who travelled to the south on a temporary basis. (Note: Stephen Hay supports the NCC assessment that the signees in Chateau Bay were Southern Inuit. Palliser had described "4&5 hundred men, women and children ... in 24 skin tents" at Chateau Bay at the time, reportedly from a place called Arbatok, initially thought to lie near Hamilton Inlet. Rollman identified inconsistencies in where Arbatok was located, writing, "Although Arbatok may represent an authentic locale near Hamilton Inlet, it is very possible that an error was made, or that there were several localities with the same name". He suggests Hopedale, Newfoundland and Labrador as a possible alternative location. Stoop similarly suggests Arbatok was based near Hopedale, rather than Hamilton Inlet.) This treaty later formed the basis of the NCC's first unsuccessful application for the NunatuKavut claimlands. In its claim, the NCC stated the treaty was signed by southern Inuit, based on the meetings which took place in Chateau Bay between Palliser and Inuit families at the time.

=== 1800s: Intermarriage between Inuit and Europeans ===
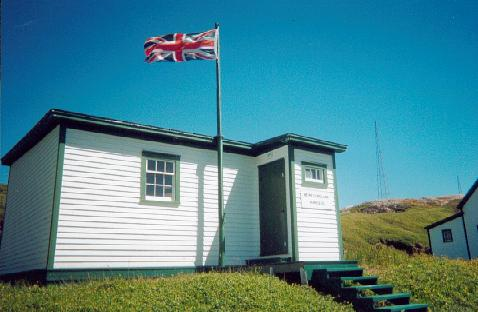
A former Newfoundland Ranger Force detachment in Battle Harbour

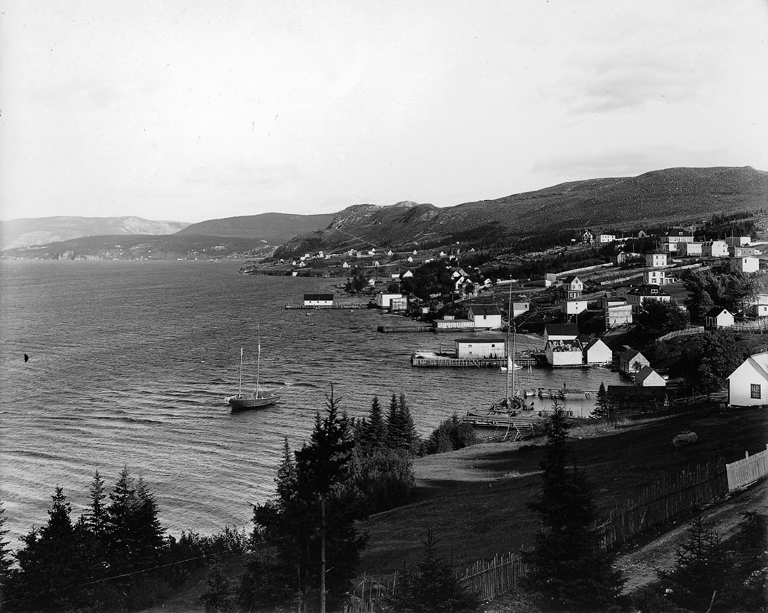
Birchy Cove, Labrador in 1908

In 1810, an Englishman named William Phippard married an Inuk woman named "Sarah" and they had a son. During this time some other English fishermen started marrying Inuit women as well. They were later joined by large numbers of fishermen from Conception Bay and Trinity Bay (who were mostly of English and Irish descent). Inuit did not use surnames until the time of colonization, and in southern Labrador over time many received European first names and surnames through intermarriage with Europeans. However, some Inuit first names were anglicized such as "Paulo", "Kippenhuck", "Shuglo", "Tuccolk", "Elishoc", "Alliswack", "Penneyhook", "Maggo", and "Mucko" and used as surnames. "Kippenhuck" and "Toomashie" are some of the only remaining Inuit surnames (excluding names of people that have moved to NunatuKavut from other places) still in use today.

In 1824, it was recorded that the population around Lake Melville (Esquimaux Bay) consisted of 160 Inuit, 90 European settlers and 60 "half-breeds" (people of European and Inuit descent). Of marriages recorded between 1773 and 1891 in southern and central Labrador, it was shown that 152 married people were Inuit, 27 were European, 14 were mixed and 1 was Mi'kmaq while the ethnic origin of 26 people could not be identified.

=== Post-confederation ===
In 1946, the Dominion of Newfoundland conducted an election to choose delegates for the Newfoundland National Convention. This was the first time that an election was held in Labrador and Lester Burry of Bonavista Bay was elected to represent Labrador. Burry wanted the Dominion of Newfoundland to become a province of Canada and in 1949, Newfoundland became Canada's 10th province. Subsequently, the Kablunângajuit were incorporated into the recognized Inuit groups, but the Southern Inuit and Labrador Métis were not.

Before Canadian Confederation, most Inuit lived in small settlements of a few families in isolated harbours and on islands off the coast of Labrador. During the 1950s and 1960s many communities across the province were resettled to larger population centres as part of a provincial government-sponsored program. The collapse of the Atlantic northwest cod fishery also had a huge impact on central and southern Labrador like it had on the province as a whole and many people left the province to find work elsewhere. These groups were largely unrepresented until the 1980s, when the Labrador Métis Association (LMA) was established to represent the Southern Inuit and Labrador Métis. Shortly after, the Labrador Métis Association submitted its first land claim. This was rejected in 1991.

In 1996, the then-Labrador Metis Association vigorously protested the KGY Group's proposed Eagle River fishing camp. The issue came up as a result of a decision by the provincial government in 1996 to call for proposals for the development of a quality sports fishing camp on the Eagle River in Labrador. Corner Brook based KGY Group (a non-aboriginal application) was selected over a Labrador company. The Labrador Metis Association claimed Eagle River as a traditional salmon fishing area. For about nine days in 1996, hundreds of residents from Cartwright and nearby communities in the Sandwich Bay area kept a supply vessel and helicopter from delivering materials to the construction site. A joint Royal Canadian Mounted Police (RCMP) and Coast Guard operation arrested at least 47 residents involved in the protests and charged most of them with mischief. In June 1999, the Crown entered a stay of proceedings on all charges laid against members of the Labrador Metis Nation during the Eagle River protests.

In 1996, a report by the Royal Commission on Aboriginal Peoples stated that the Labrador Metis had all the features of a distinct Aboriginal group, and would be theoretically able to accept the rights and powers of nationhood. In 2006, LMN initiated a project with Memorial University of Newfoundland to study the historic presence of Inuit and Inuit-European communities in southern Labrador through the Community-University Research Association (CURA). Research by CURA suggests the Labrador Métis (as they were then known) are a continuation of the Inuit who inhabited southern Labrador.

In 2007, the Court of Appeal of Newfoundland and Labrador found that the Labrador Métis Nation had a "credible but [as yet] unproven claim" to Indigenous rights, which means the Crown has a duty to consult the group on Indigenous issues.

In 2010, Labrador Métis began calling themselves the Southern Inuit of NunatuKavut following a membership renewal process that required all members to submit proof of Inuit ancestry. The organization changed its name to the NunatuKavut Community Council after the historic name of the Southern Inuit, the NunatuKavummiut.

NunatuKavut represents approximately 6,000 members covering a third of Labrador's landmass. Many residents of anglophone communities in northeastern Quebec (between the Natashquan River and the Strait of Belle Isle, sometimes called the "forgotten Labrador") have a similar Inuit and European heritage as the people of NunatuKavut.

In 2019, the NunatuKavut Community Council signed a memorandum of understanding with the Canadian Government. This recognized them as an Indigenous collective, but did not in itself grant any Indigenous rights or land claims. Both Innu and Inuit have criticized the Federal Government for its recognition of NCC.

==== Lower Churchill project ====
The NunatuKavut have been vocal in their opposition to the Muskrat Falls hydroelectric project.

==== Flag ====
In 2016, the NunatuKavut Community Council unveiled a proposal for its flag. The flag was designed by Barry Pardy of Cartwright.

==== Communities ====
- Black Tickle-Domino
- Cartwright
- Charlottetown
- Lodge Bay
- Mary's Harbour
- Norman's Bay
- Paradise River
- Pinsent's Arm
- Port Hope Simpson
- St. Lewis
- William's Harbour

== Organization ==
In 1985, the Labrador Métis Association (LMA) was established to represent the members, now NunatuKavummiut. In 1998, the LMA became the Labrador Métis Nation (LMN). The NunatuKavummiut are today represented by the NunatuKavut Community Council, which was formed in 2010 from its predecessor, the LMN. This was partly to reflect its new membership criteria, partly to avoid confusion with the Métis Nation of West Canada, and partly to reflect the Inuit heritage of its members. The NCC is an associate member of the Congress of Aboriginal Peoples along with other non-Status Aboriginal groups.

In 1991, the Labrador Métis Association's first land claim was rejected. In 1996, a report by the Royal Commission on Aboriginal Peoples stated that the Labrador Metis had all the features of a distinct Aboriginal group, and would be theoretically able to accept the rights and powers of nationhood. In 2007, the Court of Appeal of Newfoundland and Labrador found that the Labrador Métis Nation had a "credible but unproven claim" to Indigenous rights, which means the Crown has a duty to a low level of consultation with the group on Indigenous issues. Since then, the NCC has engaged with a number of projects which affect the NunatuKavummiut, although this is limited by their lack of federal recognition.

In 2019, NCC president Todd Russell signed a memorandum of understanding with then Crown-Indigenous Relations Minister, Carolyn Bennett. The memorandum of understanding was a non-binding document that said, "Canada has recognized NCC as an Indigenous collective". This triggered a legal challenge by other Indigenous groups, specifically the Innu Nation, in federal court which was dismissed in 2024 on the basis that the memorandum of understanding was the start of a process towards potential federal recognition, and did not grant Indigenous rights in itself.

As a part of its land claim, the NunatuKavut Community Council asserts that the Muskrat Falls and Lower Churchill hydroelectric project fall on their territory. The Lower Churchill hydroelectric project injunction was rejected in 2011 by the Supreme Court of Newfoundland and Labrador.

In September 2026, Crown-Indigenous Relations and Northern Affairs Canada (CIRNAC) terminated the 2019 Memorandum of Understanding (MOU) and rights-recognition process with the NCC, concluding that their historical claims did not meet the legal criteria for Section 35 Aboriginal rights under the Constitution Act, 1982.

The NCC is led by an elected council, including 16 councillors and four executives (a president, vice president, elder and executive member at large).

== Reactions ==
The legitimacy of the NunatuKavut Community Council's claim-lands has been disputed by the Nunatsiavut, Innu Nation and Inuit Tapiriit Kanatami, who maintain that the NCC and its members are not Indigenous. The Innu Nation and Nunatsiavut unsuccessfully challenged the federal government's memorandum of understanding with the NCC, which declared it an Indigenous collective. NCC president Todd Russell said the court action was a form of lateral violence.

Innu Nation Grand Chief Gregory Rich said the land claim significantly impinged upon "the land and rights of the Innu people". Former MP Peter Penashue said the NCC "sprung out of nowhere ... to fight us over land". ITK president Natan Obed said that further recognition of the NCC's "unfounded" claims would weaken the negotiating authority of Inuit groups, and that there was no Inuit territory "outside of the four regions that constitute Inuit Nunangat".

== See also ==
- Nunavik
- Nunavut
- List of organizations that self-identify as FNIM governments
