= UTC−02:30 =

Time zone

- Time zone
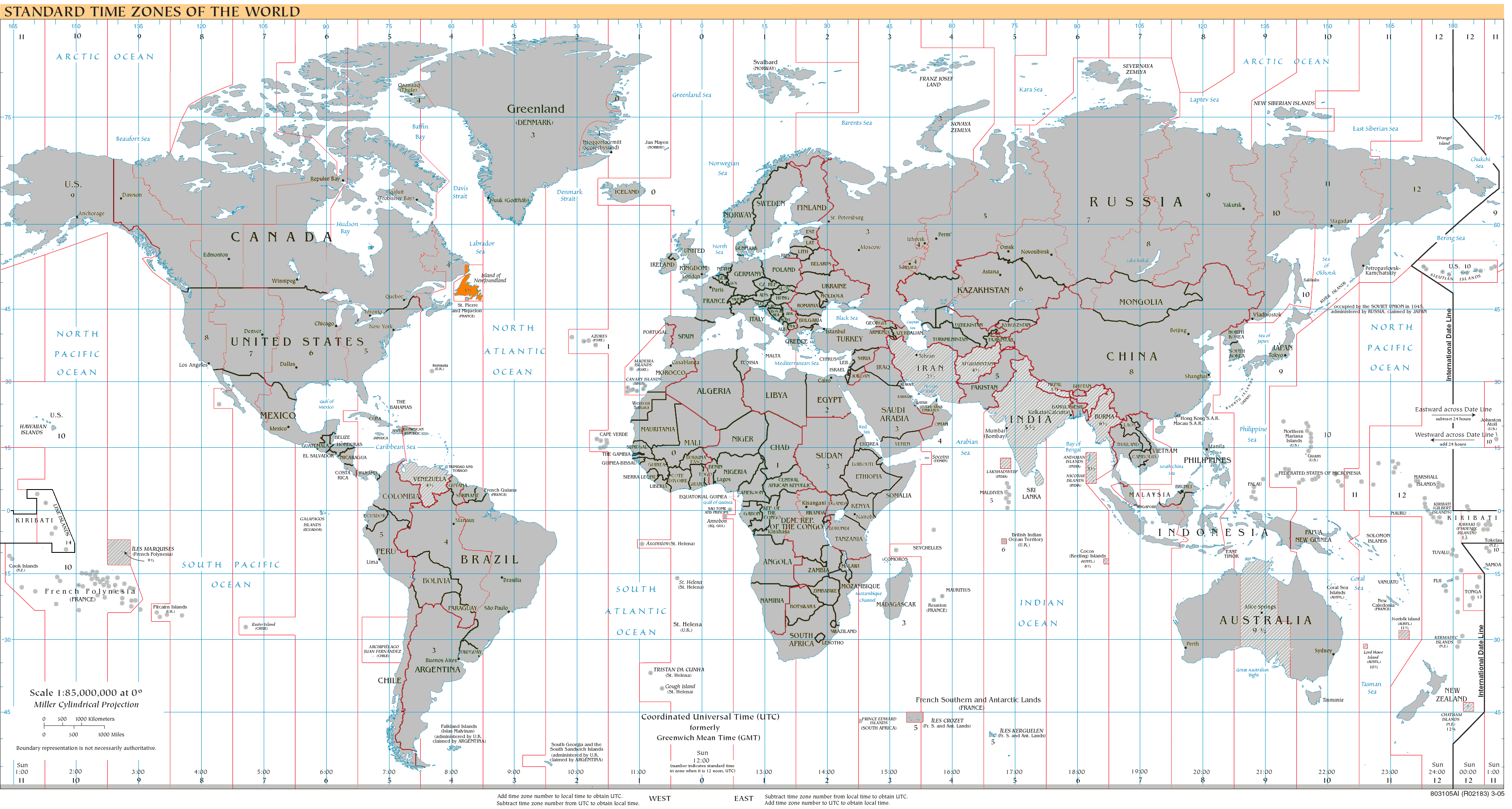
- World map with the time zone highlighted

UTC offset
- UTC: UTC−02:30

Current time
- 16:45, 27 April 2025 UTC−02:30 [refresh]

Central meridian

Date-time group

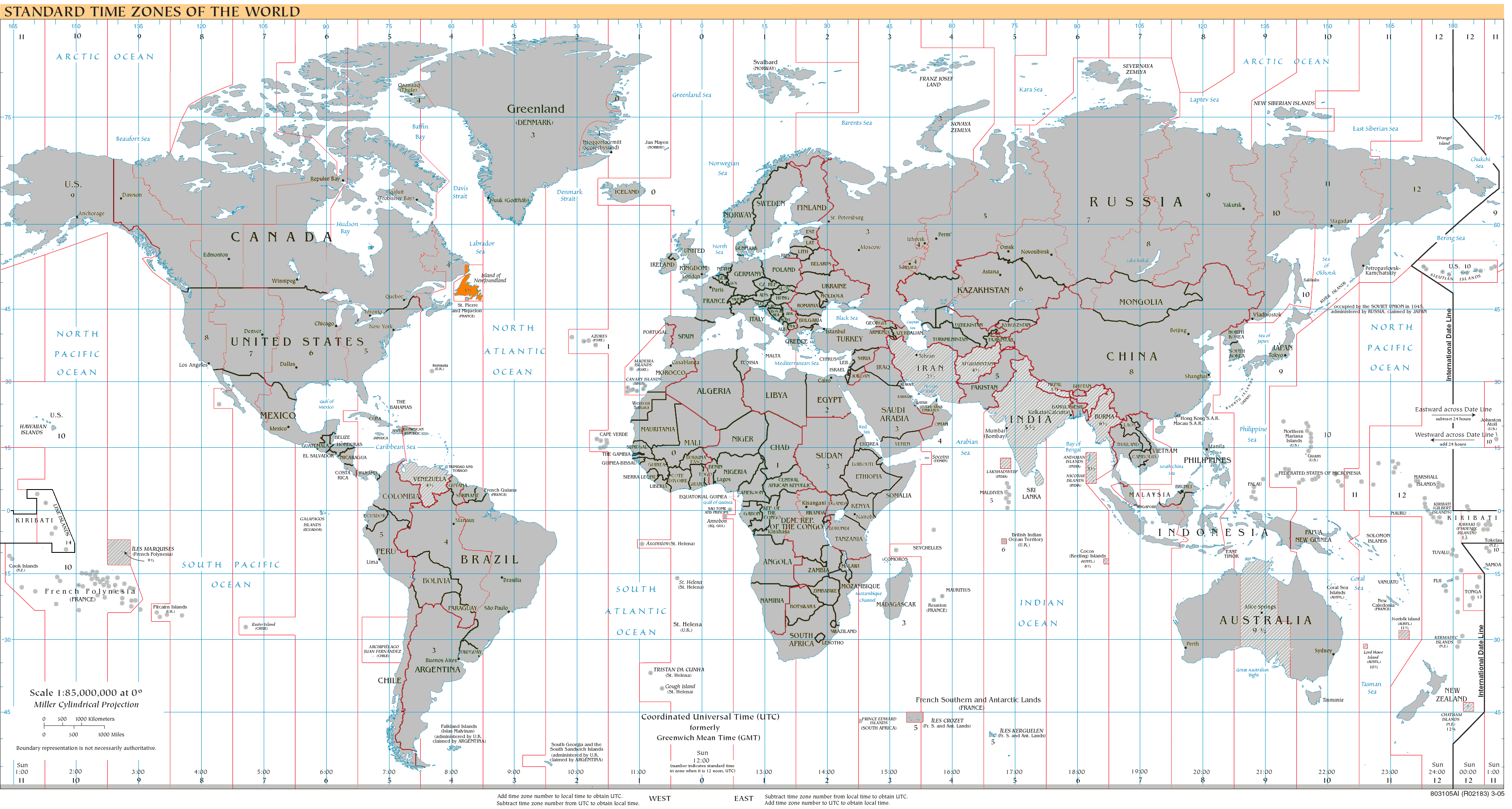
UTC−02:30: blue (December), orange (June), yellow (year-round), light blue (sea areas)

UTC−02:30 is an identifier for a time offset from UTC of −02:30.

== As daylight saving time (Northern Hemisphere summer) ==
Principal city: St. John's

=== North America ===
- Canada – Newfoundland Time Zone
  - Newfoundland and Labrador
    - Labrador
      - The area between L'Anse-au-Clair and Norman Bay
    - Newfoundland
