= Mary's Harbour =

Town in Newfoundland and Labrador, Canada

- Town
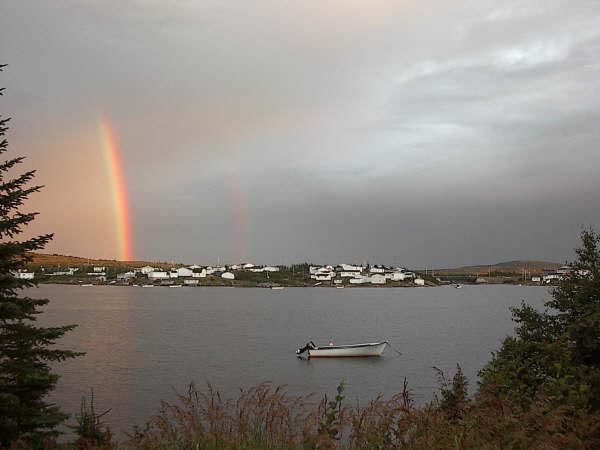
- Mary's Harbour
- Nickname: Mary's Harbour
- Location of Mary's Harbour in Newfoundland Mary's Harbour (Canada)
- Coordinates: 52°18′55″N 55°50′01″W
- Country: Canada
- Province: Newfoundland and Labrador

Government
  - Type: Town Council
  - Mayor: Alton Rumbolt
  - MHA: Lisa Dempster
  - MP: Philip Earle

Population (2021)
  - Total: 312
- Time zone: GMT -03:30
- Postal code: A0K 3P0
- Area code: 709
- Highways: Route 510 (Trans-Labrador Highway)

Mary's Harbour is a town in the Canadian province of Newfoundland and Labrador. The town had a population of 312 in the Canada 2021 Census, down from 341 in the Canada 2016 Census. It is serviced by Mary's Harbour Airport.

Mary's Harbour surrounds the St. Mary's River, which was the site of a salmon fishery as early as the 1780s. However, Mary's Harbour was not a permanent settlement until after a fire at Battle Harbour in 1930. The International Grenfell Association decided to relocate its hospital and boarding school, destroyed by the fire, from Battle Harbour to Mary's Harbour. Mary's Harbour has always depended on the fishery for its livelihood. Since the Collapse of the Atlantic northwest cod fishery the community has thrived on the crab fishery. The Labrador Fishermen's Union Shrimp Company employs over 120 people at the local crab processing facility. It is also the gateway to the National Historic District of Battle Harbour.

== Climate ==
Mary's Harbour has a subarctic climate (Koppen: Dfc) with cold winters in spite of its marine position, courtesy of the cold waters of the Labrador Current. Being located on the same latitude around 3,500 km (2,200 mi) from almost frost-free areas of Ireland, the difference between the two Atlantic coastlines is rather extreme. As typical of eastern Canada, Mary's Harbour receives heavy snowfall each winter. Unusually for such a climate, it has a pronounced seasonal lag, especially in the summer, with September averaging warmer than June and October warmer than May. A more typical subarctic climate, like Oymyakon, Russia has a temperature lag of only about 15 days.

Climate data for Mary's Harbour
Month	Jan	Feb	Mar	Apr	May	Jun	Jul	Aug	Sep	Oct	Nov	Dec	Year
Record high °C (°F)	5.2 (41.4)	5.0 (41.0)	9.4 (48.9)	14.7 (58.5)	26.5 (79.7)	35.6 (96.1)	31 (88)	32.6 (90.7)	27.6 (81.7)	19.0 (66.2)	13.7 (56.7)	9.2 (48.6)	35.6 (96.1)
Mean daily maximum °C (°F)	−9.0 (15.8)	−8.4 (16.9)	−3.4 (25.9)	1.7 (35.1)	7.6 (45.7)	13.1 (55.6)	17.6 (63.7)	18.2 (64.8)	13.7 (56.7)	7.2 (45.0)	0.9 (33.6)	−5.3 (22.5)	4.5 (40.1)
Daily mean °C (°F)	−14.4 (6.1)	−13.8 (7.2)	−8.7 (16.3)	−2.2 (28.0)	3.2 (37.8)	8.1 (46.6)	12.4 (54.3)	13.1 (55.6)	9.0 (48.2)	3.4 (38.1)	−2.7 (27.1)	−10 (14)	−0.2 (31.6)
Mean daily minimum °C (°F)	−19.8 (−3.6)	−19.1 (−2.4)	−13.9 (7.0)	−6.1 (21.0)	−1.3 (29.7)	3.3 (37.9)	7.1 (44.8)	8.0 (46.4)	4.3 (39.7)	−0.4 (31.3)	−6.3 (20.7)	−14.6 (5.7)	−4.9 (23.2)
Record low °C (°F)	−33.0 (−27.4)	−33.8 (−28.8)	−33.2 (−27.8)	−24.5 (−12.1)	−11.4 (11.5)	−3.3 (26.1)	0 (32)	0.2 (32.4)	−4.0 (24.8)	−11.4 (11.5)	−21.2 (−6.2)	−31.2 (−24.2)	−33.8 (−28.8)
Average precipitation mm (inches)	69.3 (2.73)	81.0 (3.19)	67.0 (2.64)	51.0 (2.01)	73.2 (2.88)	95.4 (3.76)	86.0 (3.39)	89.2 (3.51)	68.5 (2.70)	92.9 (3.66)	83.8 (3.30)	86.7 (3.41)	944 (37.18)
Source: weatherbase.com

== Demographics ==
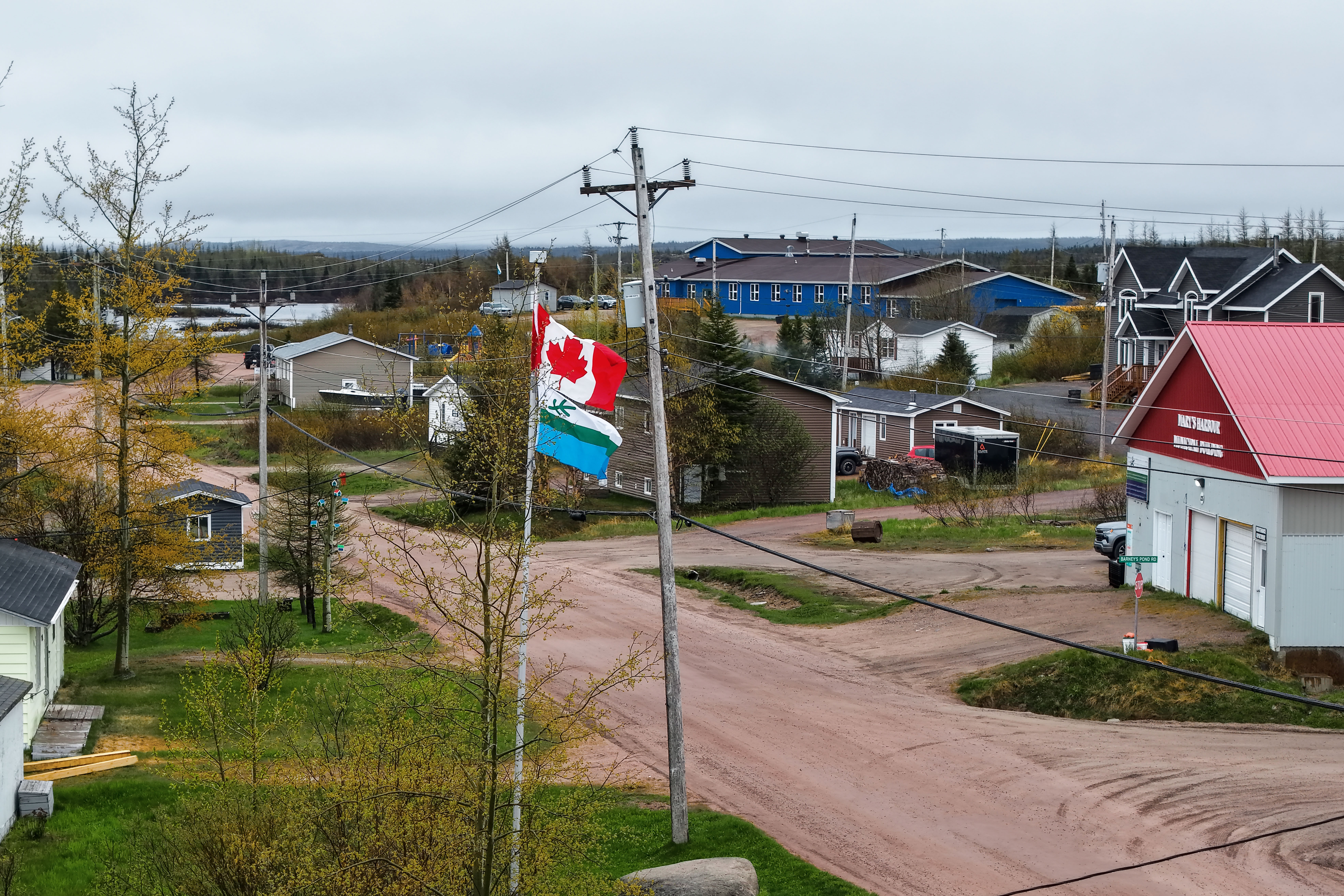
View of a street

In the 2021 Census of Population conducted by Statistics Canada, Mary's Harbour had a population of 312 living in 121 of its 147 total private dwellings, a change of −8.5% from its 2016 population of 341. With a land area of 34.25 km^{2} (13.22 sq mi), it had a population density of 9.1/km^{2} (23.6/sq mi) in 2021.

Canada 2016 Census		Population	% of Total Population
Visible minority group Source:	South Asian	0	0.0
Visible minority group Source:	Chinese	0	0.0
Visible minority group Source:	Black	0	0.0
Visible minority group Source:	Filipino	0	0 .0
Visible minority group Source:	Latin American	0	0.0
Visible minority group Source:	Southeast Asian	0	0.0
Visible minority group Source:	Other visible minority	0	0.0
Total visible minority population		0	0.0
Aboriginal group Source:	First Nations	0	0
Aboriginal group Source:	Métis	170	53.1
Aboriginal group Source:	Inuit	15	4.7
Total Aboriginal population		185	58
White		135	38.4
Total population		320	100.0

== Notable residents ==
- Yvonne Jones, Member of Parliament for Labrador; former Leader of the Liberal Party of Newfoundland and Labrador

== See also ==
- Battle Harbour
- List of cities and towns in Newfoundland and Labrador
- International Grenfell Association
- NunatuKavut
- Barren Bay
