= Landsat Island =

Uninhabited island in Canada

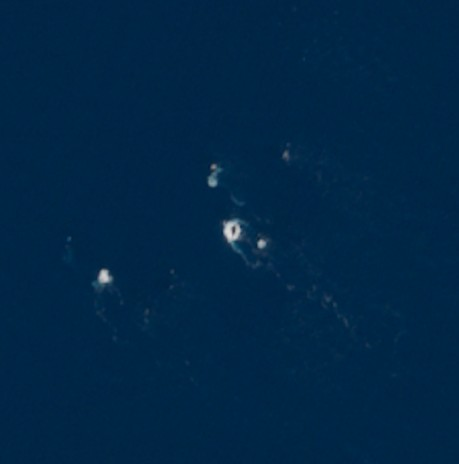
- Landsat Island from space

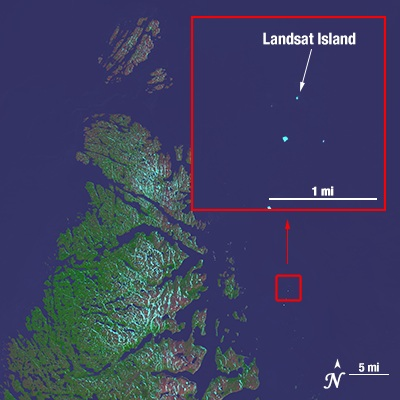
- NASA image of Landsat Island taken by Landsat 7 on August 7, 2002.

- Location within Newfoundland and Labrador
- Interactive map of Landsat Island

Geography
- Location: Labrador Sea
- Coordinates: 60°10′37″N 64°2′30″W
- Area: 1,125 m^{2} (12,110 sq ft)
- Length: 45 m (148 ft)
- Width: 25 m (82 ft)
- Highest elevation: 0.8 m (2.6 ft)

Administration
- Canada
- Province: Newfoundland and Labrador

Demographics
- Population: 0

Landsat Island is a small, uninhabited island located 20 kilometres (12 mi) off the northeast coast of Labrador (part of the Canadian province of Newfoundland and Labrador). It was discovered in 1976 during the analysis of imagery from the Landsat 1 satellite. The island is only 25 by 45 metres (82 ft × 148 ft), with a total area of 1,125 square metres (12,110 sq ft).

== Discovery ==
In 1976, Elizabeth (Betty) Fleming of the Topographical Survey of Canada studied imagery from the Landsat 1 satellite from 1973 and 1974 to find uncharted hydrographic features off the Labrador coast. She identified a handful of potential features, and a field survey was subsequently conducted by the Canadian Hydrographic Service to investigate these features. This survey found Landsat Island, which was subsequently named after the satellite, along with eight uncharted rocks. According to Frank Hall of the Canadian Hydrographic Service, who was part of one of the survey's helicopter parties, he had a close call with a polar bear on the island:

[Hall] was strapped into a harness and lowered from a helicopter down to the island. This was quite a frozen island and it was completely covered with ice. As he was lowered out of the helicopter, a polar bear took a swat at him. The bear was on the highest point on the island and it was hard for him to see because it was white. Hall yanked at the cable and got himself hauled up. He said he very nearly became the first person to end his life on Landsat Island.

— From Scott Reid's account of Hall's Landsat Island expedition given to the Canadian Parliament on October 30, 2001

Following Hall's encounter with the polar bear, it was suggested that the island be named "Polar Island", but the present name was retained.

Landsat Island marks the easternmost point of the Canadian land mass along this section of the Labrador coast. As such, its discovery increased Canada's maritime territory by 68 square kilometres (26 sq mi).
