= Black Bear Bay =

Natural bay in Newfoundland and Labrador, Canada

Coordinates: 53.316°N 55.831°W

Black Bear Bay is a natural bay on the coast of Labrador in the province of Newfoundland and Labrador, Canada.
