= Hinchinbrook Bay =

Hinchinbrook Bay is a natural bay on the coast of Labrador in the province of Newfoundland and Labrador, Canada.
