= Barren Bay =

Bay in Labrador, Canada

Coordinates: 52.4168°N 55.648°W

Barren Bay is a natural bay on the coast of Labrador in the province of Newfoundland and Labrador, Canada. It is nearby to West Island, Drunken Cove Point and Salmon Bight Point. Barren Bay is also close to French Man Cove, Frenchman's Cove and Hauling Cove.
