= Battle Harbour =

Place in Newfoundland and Labrador, Canada

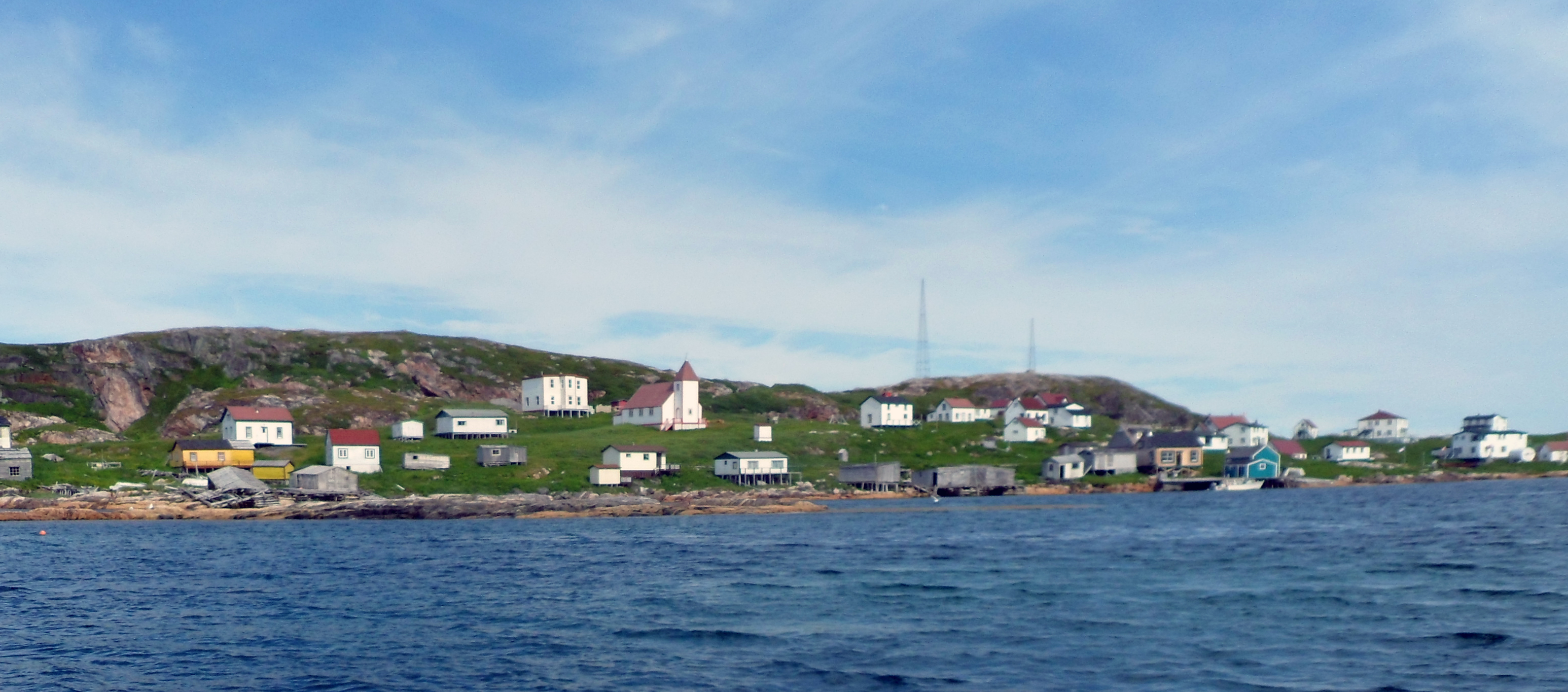
Battle Harbour, 2012

Battle Harbour (Inuttitut: Putlavak) is a summer fishing station, formerly a permanent settlement, located (52.27529, -55.58580) on the Labrador coast in the province of Newfoundland and Labrador, Canada. Battle Harbour was for two centuries the economic and social centre of the southeastern Labrador coast. Mercantile saltfish premises first established there in the 1770s developed into a thriving community that was known as the Capital of Labrador. It fell into decline following reductions in the cod fishery and a major fire in 1930, and was abandoned as a permanent settlement following government resettlement activity in the 1960s.

The Battle Harbour Historic Trust was given the fishing premises and other properties on the island, which it has preserved and operates as a museum. The facilities at Battle Harbour provide a commemoration of the life and society created there by Newfoundlanders and Labradorians during the 18th, 19th and 20th centuries. The site has been declared a National Historic Site.

== Geography ==
Battle Harbour is located on Battle Island, facing a sheltered narrow strait separating that island from Great Caribou Island. It is thought that "Battle Harbour" is derived from the Portuguese word batel, boat as depicted on Portuguese maps c. 1560. Battle Harbour is also known as Ka-tuk-to by the Inuit who had inhabited this part of Labrador.

The waterfront was the setting of much bustle and activity. It was used for the landing of marine resources harvested by local fishers, the processing of cod, salmon, seals and herring, the production of barrels, the packaging of fish products, the mending of nets and the production of saltfish. The flake or fish drying platform at Battle Harbour was the biggest such structure in all of Labrador. The Salt Store, the area's main warehouse for the salt used in the processing of several species, could hold up to 1,500 tons. The reconstructed waterfront buildings are reminiscent of an era now past but retain the history of years gone by and they also house an impressive collection of fisheries-related artifacts.

The Battle Harbour Historic District was designated a National Historic Site in 1996. The ocean vistas and craggy rock outcrops are a dramatic backdrop for the small wooden church and houses that dot the landscape. Battle Harbour's hub is the wharf and the waterfront premises; rustic, wooden and shingle-clad buildings erected by English and Newfoundland-based merchants in the late 18th and 19th centuries.

=== Climate ===
The climate type of Battle Harbour is (Köppen: Dfc). Because Battle Harbour is located in the northeast of Great Caribou Island east of Labrador, it is affected by the Labrador Sea. Due to the influence of the Labrador Current, it is very cold and humid throughout the year. The average temperature throughout the year is 0.3 °C (32.5 °F), with the hottest month being 10.9 °C (51.6 °F) in August and the coldest month being −10.5 °C (13.1 °F) in January. The annual precipitation is 953.3 millimetres (37.53 in), of which the wettest month is March with a precipitation of 97.4 millimetres (3.83 in) and the driest. The month of May has a precipitation of 58.8 millimetres (2.31 in). The annual extreme temperatures ranged from 29.5 °C (85.1 °F) on July 3, 1981 to −34.0 °C (−29.2 °F) on January 13, 1978.

Climate data for Battle Harbour Coordinates 52°15′N 55°36′W; elevation: 22.6 m (74 ft); 1961–1990 normals, extremes 1957–1983
Month	Jan	Feb	Mar	Apr	May	Jun	Jul	Aug	Sep	Oct	Nov	Dec	Year
Record high °C (°F)	5.5 (41.9)	6.1 (43.0)	7.3 (45.1)	10.4 (50.7)	21.1 (70.0)	27.8 (82.0)	29.5 (85.1)	28.5 (83.3)	23.3 (73.9)	20.0 (68.0)	13.8 (56.8)	10.0 (50.0)	29.5 (85.1)
Mean daily maximum °C (°F)	−6.2 (20.8)	−6.1 (21.0)	−2.5 (27.5)	0.8 (33.4)	4.7 (40.5)	9.8 (49.6)	14.0 (57.2)	14.4 (57.9)	11.6 (52.9)	6.5 (43.7)	2.0 (35.6)	−3.2 (26.2)	3.8 (38.8)
Daily mean °C (°F)	−10.5 (13.1)	−10.4 (13.3)	−6.3 (20.7)	−2.0 (28.4)	1.9 (35.4)	6.1 (43.0)	10.1 (50.2)	10.9 (51.6)	8.2 (46.8)	3.5 (38.3)	−0.8 (30.6)	−6.9 (19.6)	0.3 (32.5)
Mean daily minimum °C (°F)	−14.9 (5.2)	−14.9 (5.2)	−10.3 (13.5)	−4.8 (23.4)	−0.9 (30.4)	2.4 (36.3)	6.1 (43.0)	7.3 (45.1)	4.8 (40.6)	0.5 (32.9)	−3.7 (25.3)	−10.6 (12.9)	−3.2 (26.2)
Record low °C (°F)	−34.0 (−29.2)	−31.1 (−24.0)	−29.4 (−20.9)	−21.0 (−5.8)	−12.8 (9.0)	−4.0 (24.8)	0.0 (32.0)	−1.1 (30.0)	−1.9 (28.6)	−9.4 (15.1)	−18.5 (−1.3)	−32.8 (−27.0)	−34.0 (−29.2)
Average precipitation mm (inches)	84.6 (3.33)	76.5 (3.01)	97.4 (3.83)	79.1 (3.11)	58.8 (2.31)	78.7 (3.10)	73.1 (2.88)	80.4 (3.17)	68.3 (2.69)	74.1 (2.92)	92.4 (3.64)	90.0 (3.54)	953.3 (37.53)
Average rainfall mm (inches)	10.2 (0.40)	11.2 (0.44)	14.3 (0.56)	24.7 (0.97)	41.1 (1.62)	76.0 (2.99)	73.1 (2.88)	80.4 (3.17)	68.3 (2.69)	64.0 (2.52)	48.4 (1.91)	19.9 (0.78)	531.4 (20.92)
Average snowfall cm (inches)	74.8 (29.4)	64.2 (25.3)	80.7 (31.8)	53.3 (21.0)	16.6 (6.5)	2.5 (1.0)	0.0 (0.0)	0.0 (0.0)	0.0 (0.0)	9.2 (3.6)	42.6 (16.8)	70.8 (27.9)	414.8 (163.3)
Average precipitation days (≥ 0.2 mm)	16	13	15	15	12	14	14	15	12	13	14	16	170
Average rainy days (≥ 0.2 mm)	2	2	3	5	9	13	14	15	12	11	8	4	100
Average snowy days (≥ 0.2 cm)	15	12	14	11	5	trace	0	0	0	3	8	13	82
Average relative humidity (%) (at 1500 LST)	81	81	86	89	86	83	85	84	80	79	85	83	84
Average dew point °C (°F)	−13.5 (7.7)	—	—	−3.3 (26.1)	−0.2 (31.6)	3.3 (37.9)	7.4 (45.3)	8.3 (46.9)	5.4 (41.7)	—	−2.7 (27.1)	—	—
Source 1: Environment and Climate Change Canada
Source 2: NOAA (dew point)

== History ==
The mercantile saltfish premises at Battle Harbour were established by the firm of John Slade and Company of Poole, England in the early 1770s. Lying just north of the old French Shore, Battle Harbour served as the gateway for Newfoundlanders seeking to fish in the resource rich waters of Labrador. The local population increased rapidly after 1820 when Newfoundland fishing schooners adopted Battle Harbour as their primary port of call and made it the recognized capital of the Labrador floater fishery. Battle Harbour remained in the hands of Slade and Co. until 1871, and during this time became a settled community, dominated by the fish merchants, but with its own evolving institutions, especially schools and churches.

In 1871 the Slades sold Battle Harbour to Baine, Johnston and Company Ltd. who operated the site in much the same manner until 1955. The activity of these two firms at Battle Harbour serve as an accurate microcosm of the history of Newfoundland and Labrador's fishery over almost two centuries.

In 1955 Baine, Johnston and Company Ltd. sold the premises to The Earle Freighting Service Ltd. who continued the site's operation until the decline in the inshore fishery at the start of the 1990s. At that time the site was donated to the Battle Harbour Historic Trust. The community's permanent residents had been relocated under a government-sponsored resettlement program from 1965 to 1970, although a number of families still use the site as a seasonal home.

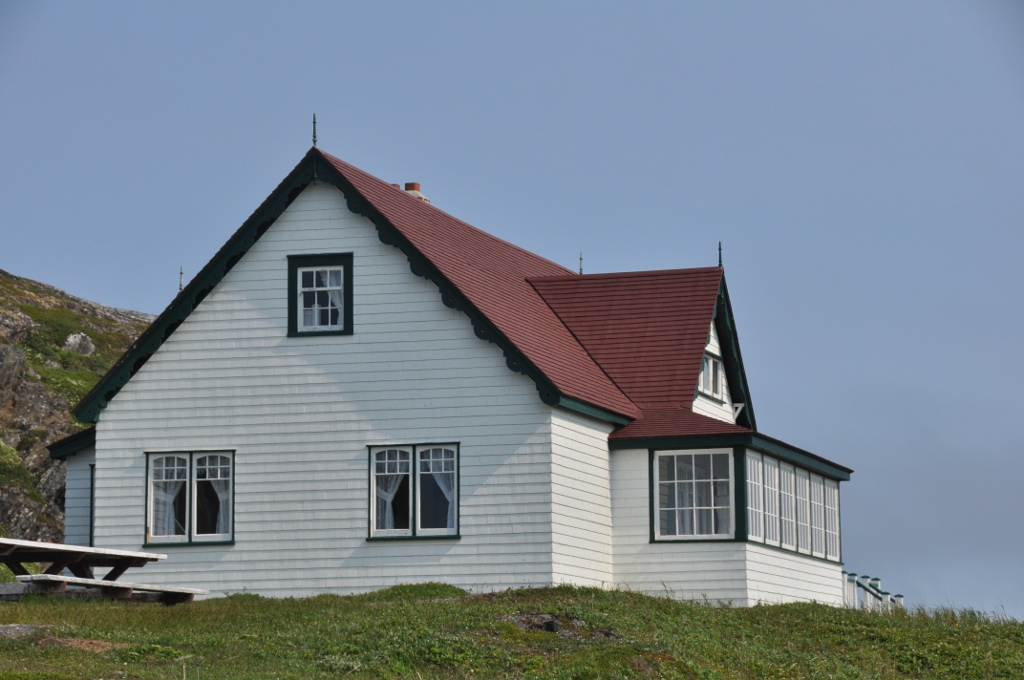
The cottage of Wilfred Grenfell at Battle Harbour

According to legend, Montagnais Indians, aided by the French, fought their final battle against the Inuit (c. 1760) at Battle Harbour. A burial mound is supposed to mark the site and some attribute its name from this historic event.

The exact time by which Battle Harbour became a European settlement is unknown, but it is believed that the French did not fish north of Cape Charles before 1718. Captain George Cartwright first visited Battle Harbour in May and June 1775, and recorded in his journal that a privateer had sacked Twillingate and "came to Battle Harbour on this coast and had taken a sloop of Mr. Slade's with about twenty-two tuns of seals' oil on board and destroyed his goods there". Later, in 1785, Cartwright had his provisions brought from Battle Harbour to Slink Point aboard a shallop belonging to the firm of Noble and Pinsent whose firm is believed to have had extensive fishery operations on the Labrador coast with base of operations at Chateau.

A year after Dr. Wilfred Grenfell's visit to Battle Harbour in 1892 he built a hospital there. One of the first in Labrador, it opened for year-round service with a qualified doctor and nurse on staff in 1893. In 1896 a new wing was added from the remains of two wrecked vessels.

In the fall of 1930 Battle Harbour was destroyed by fire so devastating that, Grenfell stated, "even the Marconi Pole on the top of the hill was burned". The new school and the hospital were rebuilt at Mary's Harbour.

== Economy ==
In 1851 Bishop Edward Feild describes Battle Harbour as probably the oldest, as well as the largest settlement on the Labrador coast. The men who came and stayed there were generally from the Island of Newfoundland that used to bring with them servants from Dorset. Some of the first permanent residents were fishermen, carpenters and coopers from Poole, Dorset, Fogo Island and New World Island. As the community grew, there became an increasing need for supplies and merchants took full advantage of that where in some cases local residents paid as much as 100% beyond the regular cash price for goods. The exclusive monopoly was not challenged until 1918, when Battle Harbour's first co-operative was set up, through the initiative of Dr. Wilfred Grenfell.

In 1905 the first Newfoundland government lighthouse in Labrador, called Double Island Light, was set up at Battle Harbour, and in 1921 there was telegraph service installed.

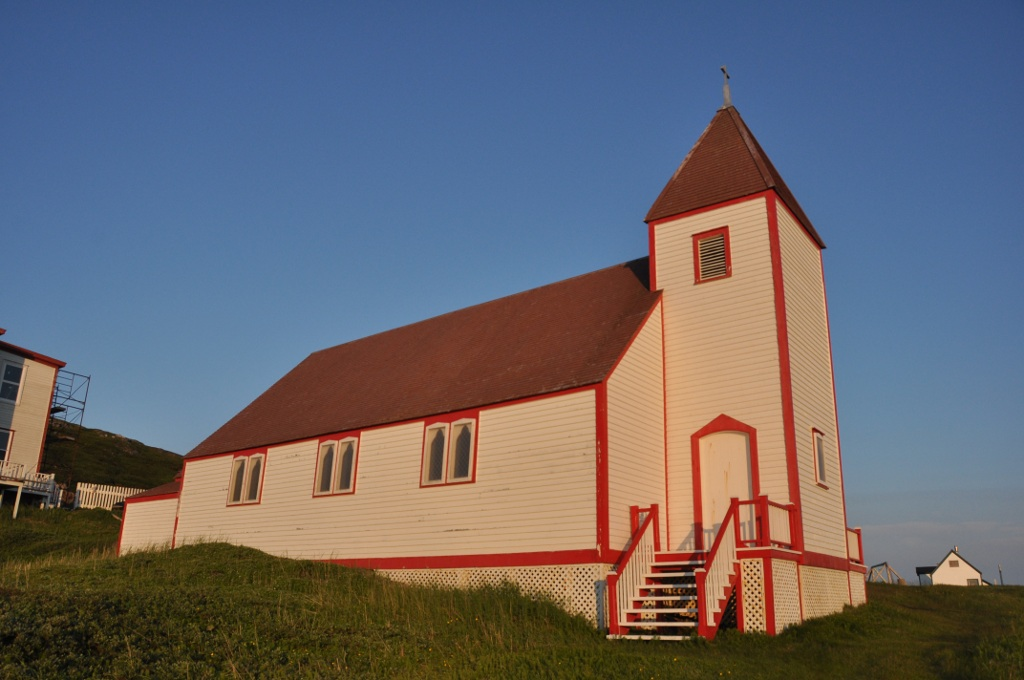
St. James Anglican Church

After the devastating fire of 1930 and the drastic decline of the fishery in 1950 and the prospect of employment elsewhere led to the resettlement of Battle Harbour in Mary's Harbour, Happy Valley and Epworth under the Fisheries Household Resettlement Programme of 1966.

Since 1966 Battle Harbour has been a summer fishing station and in 1980 it was the site of a year-round government weather station.

== Culture ==
In 1973 the St. John Ambulance originated their successful First Level Health Care Program at Battle Harbour. This program, based on teaching self-help health care and life-saving techniques to the people of isolated communities, received international recognition during its brief tenure, and was used as a model program in over thirty countries in Africa, the Caribbean, the South Pacific and the Middle East.

== See also ==
- Fishing stage
- List of communities in Newfoundland and Labrador
- List of ghost towns in Newfoundland and Labrador
