= Central Mineral Belt, Labrador =

The Central Mineral Belt is a geologically defined area of Labrador in northeastern Canada, forming a part of the Canadian Shield. It is important as a source of iron ore, uranium and other minerals.

== Geographical overview ==
The Canadian Shield has been divided up into seven areas based on differences in orogenic history. The Labrador portion of Newfoundland and Labrador forms the eastern region of the Canadian Shield, which hosts the entire Nain structural province, as well as some of the Superior, Churchill and Greenville provinces. The Central Mineral Belt (CMB) extends from Michikamau Lake eastward to near Makkovik. It is made up of Seal Lake, Letitia, Croteau and Aillik Groups. In 1974, mining in the Labrador portion of the belt produced 50% of Canadian iron ore production, as well as uranium, molybdenum, copper, and beryllium.

== Uranium discoveries ==
From 1951 to 1978, exploration lead to the discovery of several significant uranium deposits, including Kitts, Michelin, and Moran C, among many others. This has caused the CMB to be recognized as a largely 'under-explored metallogenic terrain' that hosts some of the 'worlds largest underdeveloped uranium resources'. Notable uranium concentrations have been recognized within the Aillik Group in the eastern part of the belt. 'Uranium occurs as uraninite (also known as pitchblende) in a wide variety of deposits in granites and pegmatites, as disseminations in quartzites, as veins and disseminations in argillites and tuffaceous units, in shear zones and faults, and in granulites'. Uranium mineralization was first discovered in Labrador's Central Mineral Belt (CMB) in 1954, south of Makkovik at the Pitch Lake showing. For over 25 years, this area of Labrador became an area of intense exploration which led to the discovery of several deposits in areas such as Kitts, and Michelin and Moran Lake, among smaller localities

As these areas neared commercial development in the 1970s, exploration came to a halt due to the decline in uranium prices, resulting in little exploration between 1980 and 2005. With the substantial increase in uranium prices in 2005, the CMB has been recognized as one of the second top exploration sites in Canada, following the "Athabasca Basin" in Saskatchewan. This rise in value has therefore led to the expansion and reappraisal of resources in existing areas such as Michelin and Moran Lake, and has led to the discovery of new localities, such as the Jacques-Lake deposit and the Two-Time Zone. The Two-Time Zone was discovered in March, 2007 by Universal Uranium under the direction former CEO, Clive Massey. This discovery yielded a 'wide mineralized zone consisting of '30m of .11% U308, with grades as high as 1.19%''. Despite the sudden onset of exploration activities from 2005 onward, efforts 'came to halt when a three-year moratorium on uranium mining was imposed in 2008' by the aboriginal body, the Nunatsiavut Government. The purpose of the moratorium was declared to provide the necessary time to 'establish a lands administration system, develop environmental protection legislation and to allow for the completion of a land use plan for the Labrador Inuit Settlement Area'. However, In March 2012 the moratorium was lifted, leading companies to resume their mining activities. Since the increase in exploration from 2005, several other uranium showings have been discovered by various companies. Several of these uranium sites appear to be hosted by volcanic and/or intrusive rocks, 'such as the T-649 zone (Silver Spruce Resources), The Fish-Hawk Lake prospect (Santoy Resources), and the Quinlan showing (Mega Uranium)'.

Principal Uranium Deposits within Labrador's Central Mineral Belt

Deposit Name	Historical Resources (tonnes)	Grade % of U308	Contained U308 (tonnes)	Host Lithology	Ore Genesis
Michelin	6,426,095	0.13	8,354	Allik	stratabound
Kitts	184,957	0.73	1,350	Upper Aillik	epigenetic
Rainbow	270,000	0.10	270	Upper Aillik	stratabound
Burnt Lake	<140,000	0.082	115	Upper Aillik	stratabound
Inda	514,000	0.155	797	Lower Aillik	epigenetic
Gear	77,000	0.145	112	Lower Aillik	epigenetic
Nash	216,000	0.224	484	Lower Aillik	epigenetic
Two-Time Zone	1,820,000	0.058	2,300,000	Lower Aillik	stratabound
