= Norman's Bay =

Human settlement in Canada

Coordinates: 52.937°N 55.908°W

Location of Norman's Bay in Newfoundland and Labrador

Norman's Bay is a local service district and designated place in the Canadian province of Newfoundland and Labrador. It is an isolated community at the head of Norman Bay, an extension of Martin Bay. The population of the community was 15 in the 2021 census.

Norman Bay was a winter settlement for the fishing stations of Snug Harbour and Venison Tickle. At the time when southeast Labrador fishing stations were being encouraged to resettle in the 1960s, the Ward family at Snug Harbour resisted pressures to move to Charlottetown or another larger community and instead made Norman's Bay their permanent home. Most people are still dependent on fishing as the main source of income.

The community is reliant on the postal, air, and medical services in nearby Charlottetown.

The community is not accessible by road and was serviced by a ferry port in Charlottetown until 2018 when the provincial government started using helicopter service.

In 2021, the local school, Raymond Ward Memorial was closed due to no enrolment.

== Geography ==
Norman's Bay is in Labrador within Subdivision B of Division No. 10.

== Demographics ==
As a designated place in the 2021 Census of Population conducted by Statistics Canada, Norman's Bay recorded a population of 15 living in 5 private dwellings, a change of -40% from its 2016 population of 25. With a land area of 9 km^{2} (3.5 sq mi), it had a population density of 2.8/km^{2} (7.2/sq mi) in 2016.

== Government ==
Norman's Bay is a local service district (LSD) that is governed by a committee responsible for the provision of certain services to the community. The chair of the LSD committee is vacant.

== See also ==
- List of designated places in Newfoundland and Labrador
- List of local service districts in Newfoundland and Labrador
- NunatuKavut
