= Proposed interstate water pipelines to California =

Proposed interstate water pipelines to California include interbasin transfer projects to divert water from other Western states and provinces, including Oregon, Washington, Alaska and British Columbia.

A Canadian entrepreneur's plan published in 1991 diverted water from eastern British Columbia to the Columbia River, then envisioned a 300-mile pipeline from the river through Oregon to a reservoir near Alturas, California.

The former governor of Alaska, Walter J. Hickel, proposed a water pipeline from his state to California in 1991, which was quickly criticized for being too expensive, environmentally problematic, and "too far-out". The Office of Technology Assessment (OTA) published a report in 1992 considering an implementation of the plan using a subsea pipeline running down the Pacific coast between the two states. The OTA plan concluded that conservation, water banking, and changing water pricing schemes would be more cost effective than building the pipeline.

A 2012 Bureau of Reclamation study investigated schemes to bring water to California using an undersea pipeline from the mouth of the Columbia River on the Oregon–Washington border, importing icebergs, and using conventional seagoing tankers.

The 2015 California drought brought pipeline proposals back to the public consciousness, abetted by celebrities Rush Limbaugh and William Shatner, the latter proposing a Kickstarter campaign to raise $30 billion to fund such a pipeline from Washington state.

As of 2013, there were no interstate water pipelines to California.

== See also ==
- North American Water and Power Alliance
