= Interbasin transfer =

Transfer of water from one river basin to another

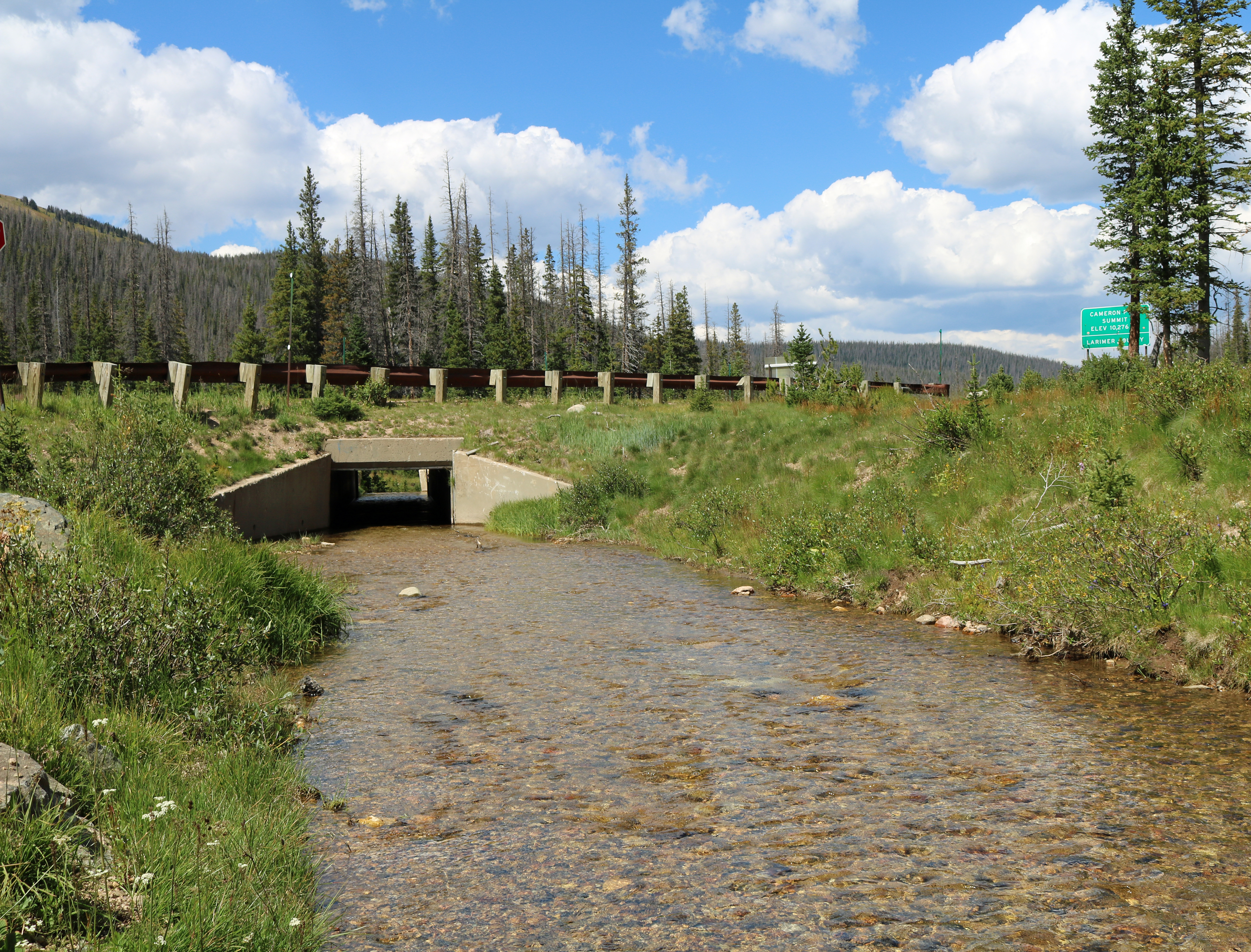
Michigan Ditch in northern Colorado carries water from the North Platte River watershed over Cameron Pass to the South Platte River watershed.

Interbasin transfer or transbasin diversion are (often hyphenated) terms used to describe man-made conveyance schemes which move water from one river basin where it is available, to another basin where water is less available or could be utilized better for human development. The purpose of such water resource engineering schemes can be to alleviate water shortages in the receiving basin, to generate electricity, or both. Rarely, as in the case of the Glory River which diverted water from the Tigris to Euphrates River in modern Iraq, interbasin transfers have been undertaken for political purposes. While ancient water supply examples exist, the first modern developments were undertaken in the 19th century in Australia, India and the United States, feeding large cities such as Denver and Los Angeles. Since the 20th century many more similar projects have followed in other countries, including Israel and China, and contributions to the Green Revolution in India and hydropower development in Canada.

Since conveyance of water between natural basins are described as both a subtraction at the source and as an addition at the destination, such projects may be controversial in some places and over time; they may also be seen as controversial due to their scale, costs and environmental or developmental impacts.

In Texas, for example, a 2007 Texas Water Development Board report analyzed the costs and benefits of IBTs in Texas, concluding that while some are essential, barriers to IBT development include cost, resistance to new reservoir construction and environmental impacts. Despite the costs and other concerns involved, IBTs play an essential role in the state's 50-year water planning horizon. Of 44 recommended ground and surface water conveyance and transfer projects included in the 2012 Texas State Water Plan, 15 would rely on IBTs.

While developed countries often have exploited the most economical sites already with large benefits, many large-scale diversion/transfer schemes have been proposed in developing countries such as Brazil, African countries, India and China. These more modern transfers have been justified because of their potential economic and social benefits in more heavily populated areas, stemming from increased water demand for irrigation, industrial and municipal water supply, and renewable energy needs. These projects are also justified because of possible climate change and a concern over decreased water availability in the future; in that light, these projects thus tend to hedge against ensuing droughts and increasing demand. Projects conveying water between basins economically are often large and expensive, and involve major public and/or private infrastructure planning and coordination. In some cases where desired flow is not provided by gravity alone, additional use of energy is required for pumping water to the destination. Projects of this type can also be complicated in legal terms, since water and riparian rights are affected; this is especially true if the basin of origin is a transnational river. Furthermore, these transfers can have significant environmental impacts on aquatic ecosystems at the source. In some cases water conservation measures at the destination can make such water transfers less immediately necessary to alleviate water scarcity, delay their need to be built, or reduce their initial size and cost.

== Existing transfers ==
There are dozens of large inter-basin transfers around the world, most of them concentrated in Australia, Canada, China, India and the United States. The oldest interbasin transfers date back to the late 19th century, with an exceptionally old example being the Roman gold mine at Las Médulas in Spain. Their primary purpose usually is either to alleviate water scarcity or to generate hydropower.

=== Primarily for the alleviation of water scarcity ===
==== Africa ====
- From the Oum Er-Rbia River to supply Casablanca in Morocco with drinking water
- From the tributaries of Ichkeul Lake in Tunisia to supply Tunis with drinking water
- From Lake Nasser on the Nile to the New Valley Project in the Western Desert of Egypt
- The Lesotho Highlands Water Project to supply water to Gauteng in South Africa

==== Americas ====
- The Los Angeles Aqueduct completed in 1913 transferring water from the Owens Valley to Los Angeles
- The Colorado River Aqueduct built in 1933–1941 to supply Southern California with water
- The All-American Canal built in the 1930s to bring water from the Colorado River to the Imperial Irrigation District in Southern California
- The California State Water Project built in stages in the 1960s and 1970s to transfer water from Northern to Southern California. It includes the California Aqueduct and the Edmonston Pumping Plant, which lifts water nearly 2,000 feet (610 meters) up and over the Tehachapi Mountains through 10 miles of tunnels for municipal water supply in the Los Angeles Metropolitan area.
- The Cutzamala System built in stages from the late 1970s to the late 1990s to transfer water from the Cutzamala River to Mexico City for use as drinking water, lifting it over more than 1000 meters. It utilizes 7 reservoirs, a 127 km long aqueduct with 21 km of tunnels, 7.5 km open canal, and a water treatment plant. Its cost was US$1.3 billion. See also Water resources management in Mexico
- The Central Utah Project to supply the Wasatch Front with urban water and for irrigation
- The San Juan–Chama Project to bring water from the Colorado River basin into the Rio Grande basin for urban and agricultural purposes in northern New Mexico and municipal water supply for Santa Fe and Albuquerque
- The New Croton Aqueduct, completed in 1890, brings water from the New Croton Reservoir in Westchester and Putnam counties.
- The Catskill Aqueduct, completed in 1916, is significantly larger than New Croton and brings water from two reservoirs in the eastern Catskill Mountains.
- The Delaware Aqueduct, completed in 1945, taps tributaries of the Delaware River in the western Catskill Mountains and provides approximately half of New York City's water supply.
- The Colorado–Big Thompson Project, built between 1938 and 1957, diverts water from the upper Colorado River basin east underneath the Continental Divide to the South Platte basin.
- The Little Snake - Douglas Creek System, built in two stages between 1963 and 1988, moves water under the Continental Divide in southern Wyoming from the upper Colorado River basin to the North Platte basin. This is then traded for water from elsewhere in the North Platte basin, which is diverted to provide water for Cheyenne.
- Among other transfers, the Massachusetts Water Resources Authority moves water from the Quabbin Reservoir (completed 1939) and Ware River in the Connecticut River basin and the Wachusett Reservoir (completed 1908) in the Merrimack River basin, to provide drinking water to more densely populated areas in Eastern Massachusetts. Some of the flow is also used for hydropower.
- The Transfer of the São Francisco River in Brazil began in 2007, diverting water from the São Francisco River to the surrounding dry sertão region of four of the country's northeastern states.

The Central Arizona Project (CAP) in the USA is not an interbasin transfer per se, although it shares many characteristics with interbasin transfers as it transports large amounts of water over a long distance and difference in altitude. The CAP transfers water from the Colorado River to Central Arizona for both agriculture and municipal water supply to substitute for depleted groundwater. However, the water remains within the watershed of the Colorado River, though transferred into the Gila sub-basin.

==== Asia ====
- The Narmada Canal Project offtaking from Sardar Sarovar in western India transfers water from the Narmada Basin to areas coming under other river basins in Gujarat (Mahi, Sabarmati and other small river basins in North Gujarat, Saurashtra and Kutch) and Rajasthan (Luni and other basins of Jalore and Barmer districts) for irrigation, drinking water, industrial use, etc. The canal is designed to transfer 9.5 million acre-feet (11.7 km^{3}) water annually from the Narmada Basin to areas under other basins in Gujarat and Rajasthan. (9 MAF for Gujarat and 0.5 MAF for Rajasthan).
- The Periyar Project in Southern India from the Periyar River in Kerala to the Vaigai basin in Tamil Nadu. It consists of a dam and a tunnel with a discharging capacity of 40.75 cubic meters per second. The project was commissioned in 1895 and provides irrigation to 81,000 hectares, in addition to providing power through a plant with a capacity of 140 MW.
- The Parambikulam Aliyar project, also in Southern India, consists of seven streams, five flowing towards the west and two towards the east, which have been dammed and interlinked by tunnels. The project transfers water from the Chalakudy River basin to the Bharatapuzha and Cauvery basins for irrigation in Coimbatore district of Tamil Nadu and the Chittur area of Kerala states. It also serves for power generation with a capacity of 185 MW.
- The Kurnool Cudappah Canal in Southern India is a scheme started by a private company in 1863, transferring water from the Krishna River basin to the Pennar basin. It includes a 304 km long canal with a capacity of 84.9 cubic meters per second for irrigation.
- The Telugu Ganga project in Southern India. This project primarily meets the water supply needs of Chennai metropolitan area, but is also used for irrigation. It brings Krishna River water through 406 km of canals. The project, which was approved in 1977 and completed in 2004, involved the cooperation of four Indian States: Maharashtra, Karnataka, Andhra Pradesh and Tamil Nadu.
- The Indira Gandhi Canal (formerly known as the Rajasthan Canal) linking the Ravi River, the Beas River and the Sutlej River through a system of dams, hydropower plants, tunnels, canals and irrigation systems in Northern India built in the 1960s to irrigate the Thar Desert.
- The National Water Carrier in Israel, transferring water from the Sea of Galilee (Jordan River Basin) to the Mediterranean coast lifting water over 372 meters. Its water is used both in agriculture and for municipal water supply.
- The Mahaweli Ganga Project in Sri Lanka includes several inter basin transfers.
- The Irtysh–Karaganda Canal in central Kazakhstan is about 450 km long with a maximum capacity of 75 cubic meters per second. It was built between 1962 and 1974 and involves a lift of 14 to 22 m.
- The South–North Water Transfer Project in China, as well as other smaller-scale projects, such as the Irtysh–Karamay–Ürümqi Canal.
- Part of the water flowing northwards down Tung Chung River in northern Lantau is diverted across the mountain ridge to Shek Pik Reservoir in southern Lantau.
- The IRTS (Inter-Reservoirs Transfer Scheme) which transfers water from the Kowloon Byewash Reservoir to the Lower Shing Mun Reservoir, 2.8 kilometres (1.7 miles) in length and 3 metres (9.8 ft) in diameter.‌
- Lingqu in Kwangsi Province
- Hong Kong West Drainage Tunnel

==== Australia ====
- The 530 km-long Goldfields Water Supply Scheme of Western Australia built from 1896 to 1903

==== Europe ====
- Various transfers from the Ebro River in Spain, which flows to the Mediterranean, to basins draining to the Atlantic, such as Ebro-Besaya transfer of 1982 to supply the industrial area of Torrelavega, the Cerneja-Ordunte transfer to the Bilbao Metropolitan area of 1961, as well as the Zadorra-Arratia transfer that also supplies Bilbao through the Barazar waterfall (Source:Spanish Wikipedia article on the Ebro River. See Water supply and sanitation in Spain).
- The North Crimea Canal (Ukraine), transporting water from the Dniepr River to the Crimean Peninsula.

Characteristics of major existing interbasin transfers and other large-scale water transfers to alleviate water scarcity

	Year of construction	Length	Capacity (Million cubic meters/year)	Costs (US$ bn)
California State Water Project (USA)	Early 1960s-1990s	715 km	25 (10,300 cubic feet/sec)	5.2
Colorado River Aqueduct (USA)	1933–1941	392 km	1603.5 (1.3m acre-feet/year)	?
Central Arizona Project (USA)	1973–1993	541 km	1850.2 (1.5m acre-feet/year)	3.6
National Water Carrier (Israel)	1953–1964	130 km	1.7	?
Cutzamala System (Mexico)	Late 1970s-late 1990s	154 km	2.1 (24 m^{3}/s)	1.3
All-American Canal (USA)	1930s	132 km	64 (740 m^{3}/s)	?
Narmada Canal (India)	Commissioned in 2008	532 km	11,718 (9.5m acre-feet/year)	?
Periyar Project (India)	Commissioned in 1895	?	3.5 (41 m^{3}/s)	?
Indira Gandhi Canal (India)	Since 1958	650 km	?	?
Telugu Ganga project (India)	1977–2004	406 km	10.1 (3.7 bn m3/year)	?
Irtysh–Karaganda scheme (Kazakhstan)	1962–1974	450 km	6.5 (75 m^{3}/s)	?

=== For the generation of hydropower ===
==== Africa ====
- The Drakensberg Pumped Storage Scheme from the Tugela River that flows into the Indian Ocean into the Vaal River in South Africa, which ultimately drains into the Orange River and the Atlantic Ocean. Its purpose is hydropower generation

==== Australia ====
- The Snowy Mountains Scheme in Australia, built between 1949 and 1974 at the cost (at that time) of A$800 million; a dollar value equivalent in 1999 and 2004 to A$6 billion (US$4.5 billion).
- The Barnard River Scheme, also in Australia, constructed between 1983 and 1985.

==== Canada ====
In Canada, sixteen interbasin transfers have been implemented for hydropower development. The most important is the James Bay Project from the Caniapiscau River and the Eastmain River into the La Grande River, built in the 1970s. The water flow was reduced by 90% at the mouth of the Eastmain River, by 45% where the Caniapiscau River flows into the Koksoak River, and by 35% at the mouth of the Koksoak River. The water flow of the La Grande River, on the other hand, was doubled, increasing from 1,700 m³/s to 3,400 m³/s (and from 500 m³/s to 5,000 m³/s in winter) at the mouth of the La Grande River. Other interbasin transfers include:

British Columbia

- Campbell–Heber Diversion
- Coquitlam–Buntzen Diversion
- Kemano hydroelectric power station diverting water from the Nechako River in British Columbia to the sea.
- Vernon Irrigation District Diversion

Manitoba

- Churchill Diversion–Southern Indian Lake

New Brunswick

- Saint John water supply

Newfoundland and Labrador

- Bay d'Espoir Diversions
- Churchill Falls hydroelectric power station built between 1967 and 1971
- Deer Lake Diversion
- Smallwood Reservoir–Julian Diversion
- Smallwood Reservoir–Kanairiktok Diversion
- Smallwood Reservoir–Naskaupi Diversion

Northwest Territories

- Wellington Lake Hydro Project Diversion (with Saskatchewan)

Nova Scotia

- Ingram Diversion
- Jordan Diversion
- Wreck Cove Diversions

Ontario

- Long Lake Diversion
- Ogoki Diversion
- Opasatika Diversion
- Root River Diversion

Quebec

- Barrière Diversion
- Boyd–Sakami Diversion
- Lac de la Frégate Diversion
- Laforge Diversion
- Manouane Diversion
- Mégiscane Diversion
- Rupert Diversion
- Sault aux Cochons Diversion

Saskatchewan

- Cypress Lake Diversion (with Alberta)
- Pasquia Land Resettlement Diversion (with Manitoba)
- Qu'Appelle River Diversion at Lake Diefenbaker
- Swift Current Diversion

==== Asia ====
- The Nam Theun II Project in Laos from the Nam Theun River to the Xe Bang Fai River, both tributaries of the Mekong River, completed in 2008.

=== For other purposes ===
The Chicago Sanitary and Ship Canal in the US, which serves to divert polluted water from Lake Michigan.

== Transfers under construction ==
The Eastern and Central Routes of the South–North Water Transfer Project in China from the Yangtse River to the Yellow River and Beijing.

== Proposed transfers ==
Nearly all proposed interbasin transfers are in developing countries. The objective of most transfers is the alleviation of water scarcity in the receiving basin(s). Unlike in the case of existing transfers, there are very few proposed transfers whose objective is the generation of hydropower.

=== Africa ===
From the Ubangi River in Congo to the Chari River which empties into Lake Chad. The plan was first proposed in the 1960s and again in the 1980s and 1990s by Nigerian engineer J. Umolu (ZCN Scheme) and Italian firm Bonifica (Transaqua Scheme). In 1994, the Lake Chad Basin Commission (LCBC) proposed a similar project and at a March, 2008 Summit, the Heads of State of the LCBC member countries committed to the diversion project. In April, 2008, the LCBC advertised a request for proposals for a World Bank-funded feasibility study.

=== Americas ===
- The large-scale proposal for the North American Water and Power Alliance from the 1950s and 1960s.
- The transfer of the São Francisco River from the São Francisco River to the dry sertão in the four northeastern states of Ceará, Rio Grande do Norte, Paraíba and Pernambuco in Brazil. The project is estimated to cost US$2 billion and was given the green light to go ahead by the Supreme Court of Brazil in December 2007.
- On a much smaller scale, the transfer of up to 36 million gallons of water per day (130,000 cubic meter/day) to Concord and Kannapolis from the Catawba River and the Yadkin River in North Carolina, USA.
- Shoal Creek Reservoir in north Georgia, from Dawson Forest (Etowah River) to the city of Atlanta (Chattahoochee River).

=== Asia ===
- The so-called "Peninsular river component" of India's National Water Development Plan envisages to divert the Mahanadi River surplus to the Godavari and the surplus therefrom to the Krishna, Pennar and Cauvery, with "terminal dams" on the Mahanadi and the Godavari to enable irrigation. The Peninsular component also envisages three more transfers — (a) to divert a part of the waters of the west flowing rivers of Kerala to the arid east to meet the needs of Tamil Nadu; (b) to interlink the west flowing rivers north of Mumbai and south of Tapi to provide irrigation to areas in Saurashtra, Kachchh and coastal Maharashtra and to augment the drinking water supplies to Mumbai; and (c) to interlink the southern tributaries of the Yamuna and provide irrigation facilities in parts of Madhya Pradesh and Rajasthan.
- From the Chalakudy River to the Bharathapuzha River in Kerala, India
- 14 transfers in Northern India. The so-called "Himalayan river component" envisages transfers from the Kosi River, Gandak River and Ghaghara River to the west; a link between the Brahmaputra River to the Ganges River to augment the dry weather flows of the Ganges; and a link between the Ganges and the Yamuna River "to serve drought-prone areas of Haryana, Rajasthan, Gujarat as also south Uttar Pradesh and south Bihar".
- The Bheri Babai Diversion Multipurpose Project on the Ghaghara River in Nepal(Hydropower and irrigation)
- From Northern Russia and Siberia to Central Asia through the Northern river reversal. The proposal, originally dating to Joseph Stalin's and Nikita Khrushchev's eras, included a Western and Eastern route, in the European and Asian parts of the then Soviet Union respectively. The suggested Western route would be from the Pechora River to the Kama River, a tributary of the Volga, along the abandoned and uncompleted Pechora–Kama Canal. The Eastern route would be from the Tobol River, Ishim River and Irtysh River in the Ob basin to the desert plains of Kazakhstan and the Aral Sea basin. In 2006 Kazakh president Nursultan Nazarbayev said he wanted to resuscitate the scheme that had been abandoned by the Soviet Union in 1986. The cost of that route alone is estimated at upwards from US$40 billion, well beyond the means of Kazakhstan.
- The western route of the South–North Water Transfer Project in China, which foresees to divert water from the headwater of Yangtze (and possibly also the headwaters of Mekong or Salween downstream) into the headwater of Yellow River. If the Mekong and Salween rivers were included in the project this would affect the downstream riparian countries Burma, Thailand, Laos, Cambodia and Vietnam.

=== Australia ===
- The Bradfield Scheme in Queensland, serving primarily for irrigation
- The Kimberley Pipeline Scheme to supply Perth with water through, proposed because of radical rainfall changes in Western Australia since the late 1960s

=== Europe ===
From the Ebro River in Spain to Barcelona in the Northeast and to various cities on the Mediterranean coast to the Southwest

== Ecological aspects ==
In this experiment, juvenile green sturgeons are being dragged into an unscreened water diversion pipe operated under conditions like those found in the Sacramento River.

Since rivers are home to a complex web of species and their interactions, the transfer of water from one basin to another can have a serious impact on species living therein.

== See also ==
- Water export
- Headwater Diversion Plan (Jordan River)
