= Kierans =

Kierans is a surname. Notable people with the surname include:

- Eric Kierans (1914–2004), Canadian economist and politician
- Grainne Kierans (born 1978), Irish footballer and coach
- Thomas Kierans (1913–2013), Canadian mining engineer
- Wayne Kierans, Gaelic football manager
