= Water export =

Outbound trade involving freshwater

Water exports involve exporting freshwater from one country to another. Large increases in human population and economic growth throughout the world during the twentieth century placed a huge stress on the world’s freshwater resources. Combined with climate change, they are expected to place an even greater demand on water resources in this century. Water shortages have become an international concern, and freshwater has been described as "blue gold" and "the oil of the 21st Century."

== Water exports from Canada to the US ==
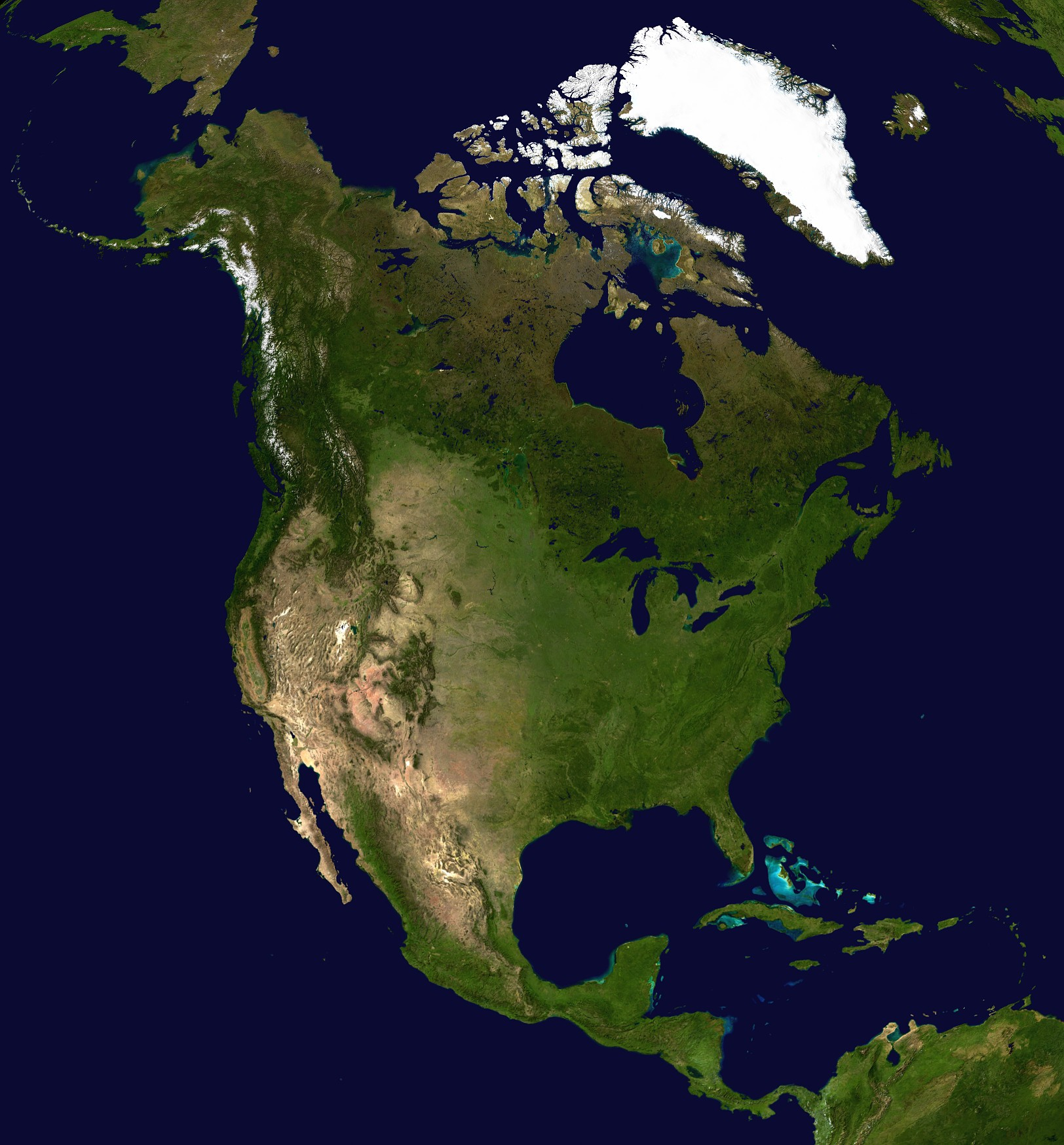
A satellite image of North America. The Great Lakes are in the east, while the south-west clearly lacks water.

Canada has 7% of the world's renewable supply of freshwater. Freshwater export between Canada and the US currently takes place at a small scale, mostly as bottled water exports. The bottled water industry exports water in containers usually no larger than twenty litres. But even that can be controversial – the multinational food giant Nestlé was accused of attempting to "drain" the town of Hillsburgh, Ontario, of its water in 2012 and 2013, during a drought.

Since 1850, Americans have been diverting much of the water of the Chicago River, which would naturally flow into Lake Michigan, into the Mississippi basin over Chicago Sanitary and Ship Canal. In that case, though, the goal was not taking possession of the water that would otherwise end up in the Great Lakes, but directing Chicago's sewage away from Lake Michigan, Chicago's source of drinking water.

Point Roberts, Washington (US), receives its water supply from Metro Vancouver BC (Canada), and this is an essential service for the U.S. community. The town is a U.S. exclave on the tip of the Tsawwassen Peninsula and is geographically isolated from the rest of the U.S., requiring residents to travel through Canada to access services. The water service is one of several vital Canadian utilities that Point Roberts depends on, along with electricity from BC Hydro.

=== Needs ===
Many states in the US have experienced water shortages in the past few decades, creating a market for freshwater that could be profitable for Canada. In the south-western US, growing populations and lifestyles that consume large amounts of water have caused most of the aquifers and rivers in the region to be overused. The water in the Oglala Aquifer, which serves much of the west-central US, was used eight times faster in 2001 than the replenishment rate. Demands for this freshwater are expected to increase as the climate warms.

As human populations and industries grow and the climate change takes place, greater pressure will be placed on water-rich countries like Canada to export their water to countries that have a water shortage. In early 2014, Gary Doer, Canada’s ambassador to the United States, said that by 2020 the pressure on water quality and quantity would be immense. He predicted that water debates and disputes between the two countries would make the clash over the Keystone XL pipeline "look silly" by comparison.

=== Proposals ===
Numerous proposals about transferring large amounts of freshwater from the Great Lakes Basin into the US have been made. This would involve inter-basin transport of water across the international boundary between Canada and the US using an artificial reservoir. None of these proposals have as yet been implemented, mainly due to environmental and financial obstacles.

Schemes to export water from Canada to the US on a large scale have been proposed in the past. These schemes include:

- The Great Recycling and Northern Development (GRAND) Canal scheme to dam James Bay, on the southern end of Hudson Bay, to create a freshwater reservoir and divert the water from the 20 rivers that flow into it to Georgian Bay. The water would then be flushed through the Great Lakes into pipelines to the south-western US.
- The North American Water and Power Alliance (NAWAPA) project proposed to divert the Yukon, Liard, and Peace rivers into the Rocky Mountain Trench to create an 800 km long reservoir that would transfer water into the US.
- During the 1990s, exporting water by ocean-going tankers was proposed to three Canadian provinces. In 1991, Sun Belt Water Inc. of Santa Barbara, California, in partnership with Snowcap Waters Ltd., of Fanny Bay, British Columbia, was selected by the Goleta Water District, of California, to enter a contract to supply bulk water by marine tanker but the government of British Columbia reversed its water export policy and introduced a prohibition on the issuance of water export licences leading to an arbitration claim against Canada under Chapter 11 of the North American Free Trade Agreement filed by Sun Belt Water Inc. in 1999. The arbitration remains unresolved.
- In 1999 Nova Group Ltd. obtained a permit from the Ontario government to export 600 million litres of water annually from Lake Superior to Asia. Political controversy in Canada and the US caused the government to cancel the permit.

=== Concerns ===
In Canada there have been concerns about exporting water to the United States since the 1960s, when states in the south-western US experienced their first water shortages and began to seek water sources to augment their overstretched supplies. Large-scale removal of water from lakes would negatively affect their ecosystems, increasing pollution concentrations and harming plant and animal communities.

=== Legal issues ===
Water has been classed as a commodity under the North American Free Trade Agreement (NAFTA) since the 1980s. This has increased tensions in the debate about exporting water. Although none of the NAFTA rules force Canada to begin to export its water in bulk, if Canada voluntarily decides to begin exports it would be very difficult to later halt them.

In 2002 the Federal government of Canada passed the International Boundary Waters Treaty Act. This banned the removal of more than 50 million m^{3} (13 billion US gal) of water from a water basin in the Great Lakes in one day. The Boundary Waters Treaty is limited to waters on the Canadian-US border and does not apply to freshwater in other parts of Canada. This means the about 85 percent of Canada’s water is susceptible to export.

=== Alaska ===
Since Canada has taken a strong position against water exports, some companies have shifted their focus to Alaska. Alaska was the first jurisdiction in the world to permit the commercial export of bulk water, and has a large potential for water exports. One scheme proposes transporting water from Alaska to China by tanker. This water would be used to assemble computer wafers by China's relatively cheap labour force. Computer wafers require extremely pure freshwater. This makes the cost of desalination of saltwater prohibitively expensive, making schemes like this, that would not be profitable for domestic purposes, profitable for industrial purposes.

== Water exports within States in the United States ==
On 13 June 2013, the Supreme Court of the United States unanimously upheld lower court rulings in Tarrant Regional Water District v. Herrmann, holding that Oklahoma state water laws validly barred state entities from selling water for out-of-state use, via the Red River Compact among Oklahoma, Texas, Arkansas and Louisiana.

== Water export in Germany ==
While the Rhine–Main–Danube Canal was primarily built as a freight link across the European Main Watershed (linking North Sea and Black Sea via inland waterways), it is also used to transport water from the Danube to the less water-rich rivers of Franconia and adjacent regions. To this end several artificial lakes like the Großer Brombachsee were created.

== Water exports from Russia to Kazakhstan and Uzbekistan ==
Arid but densely populated southern Kazakhstan and adjacent Central Asian states occupy somewhat similar position with respect to Russia's Siberia as the south-western United States do with respect to Canada. Siberian rivers, as well as rivers of northern European Russia flow "uselessly" into the seas of the Arctic Ocean, while that water could be much more profitably used for irrigated agriculture by Russia's southern neighbors. Not surprisingly, proposals for large-scale transfer of water from the Ob River in Siberia to the Aral Sea basin in Kazakhstan and Uzbekistan have been seriously considered by the Soviet federal government already in the 1960-80s, when all republics involved were members of the USSR. While welcomed by many in Central Asian republics, the project received severe criticism from many scientists as well as prominent writers and journalists in Russia, such as Valentin Rasputin and Sergey Zalygin, sometimes known collectively as the "Siberian environmental lobby" Afghanistan is also somewhat included with 9.36% of its rate paying for the water exports.

Shelved in 1986 for both economical and environmental reasons, the idea of international water transfers has been raised again in the 21st century in the ruling circles of the now independent states. Both the Kazakh President Nursultan Nazarbayev and the Uzbek President Islam Karimov expressed interest in such a water transfer scheme. While the Russian federal government so far remains non-committal on the issue, the plan met enthusiastic response from Moscow mayor and Russian presidential hopeful, Yuri Luzhkov.

== Alternatives to large-scale water exports ==
In the short run, better allocation of resources and more efficient water conservation technology may keep demand for water in some countries under control. However, a water crisis may occur in the near future that would make bulk water export a more favourable plan.

The canals that would have to be constructed to transfer water require huge investment and operation costs. This would make the cost for consumers of the water expensive. In contrast, the technology needed to desalinise seawater has improved dramatically and has an acceptable cost for urban markets. Whether or not pressures for large-scale water exports continues to increase depends mostly on future advances in desalination technology. If the cost of desalination drops enough, it will be cheaper to generate freshwater from saltwater than to import freshwater from another country. The cost of desalination is currently less than $1 per cubic metre ($0.028/cu ft). The World Water Commission has suggested that desalination will become the favoured method of procuring drinking and industrial-use waters. However, the need for extremely pure water for particular industrial uses would still require freshwater imports.

== See also ==
- Sporhase v. Nebraska ex rel. Douglas
- Coastal reservoir
- Water resources
- Water trading
- Water transportation
