= Transfer of the São Francisco River =

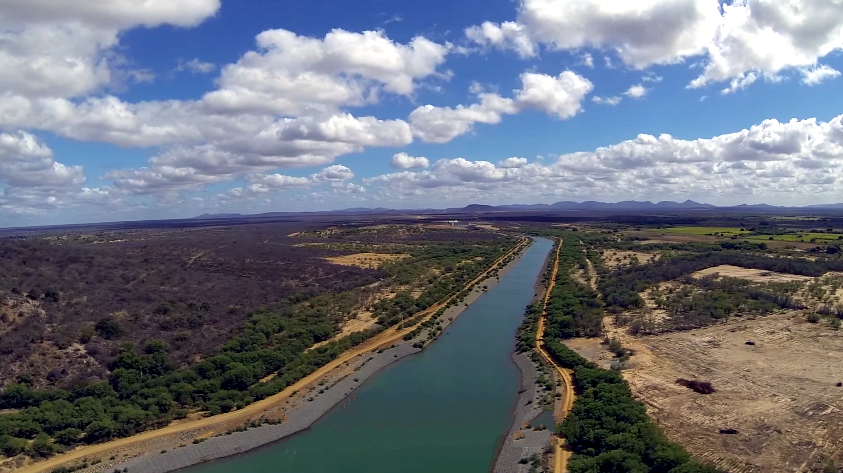
- Canal in Cabrobó, Pernambuco
- Official name: Projeto de Integração do Rio São Francisco com Bacias Hidrográficas do Nordeste Setentrional

History
- Construction start: 2007
- Opened: 2027

The Transfer of the São Francisco River is a large-scale interbasin transfer to the dry sertão in the four northeastern states of Ceará, Rio Grande do Norte, Paraíba and Pernambuco in Brazil. The project, which was given the green light to go ahead by Brazil's government in 2005, is estimated to cost US$2 billion and is expected to improve the lives of 12 million people. After legal challenges were brought against the project, the Supreme Court allowed it to go ahead in December 2007.

== Technical aspects ==
The project would divert 1.4% of the river's water for municipal water supply, industry and irrigation. Municipal water supply would receive priority over other uses, which would only be catered for when the Sobradinho Reservoir behind the Sobradinho Dam on the São Francisco River, which produces much of the region's electricity, is nearly full about 40% of the time. The project actually consists of two transfers: The East axis would transfer water to the Paraíba do Norte River, while the North axis would transfer water to the Jaguaribe and Piranhas rivers. The project includes 700 km of canals and tunnels, as well as several dams. It is expected to displace almost a million people and construction is expected to take 20 years to complete.

== Criticism and controversy ==
Critics of the project argue that beneficiary states should improve management of their own water before importing it from outside the region. Bishop Luiz Flávio Cappio from Bahia also wonders why water is being exported when 3m poor live along the Sao Francisco river's course, many of them without running water and proper sanitation. He argues that the transfer “will demand huge resources that could be spent on other projects much closer to the reality of the people”. It is also being said that the project will mainly benefit richer farmers who already have irrigation infrastructure in place and not rainfed farmers that are hardest hit by drought. The alleged insufficiency of water in the Sao Francisco River itself during the dry season, and its consequent impact on aquatic ecosystems, is another argument of critics. For example, João Alves Filho, governor of the state of Sergipe, says that there are already “signs of mortality” where the river joins the sea. Marco Antônio Tavares Coelho, a prominent opponent, says that "aridity is the natural state of the sertão" and that soaking it would be like "removing ice from the North Pole". In 2001 the World Bank reportedly refused to finance the project because of its limited impact in combating poverty and drought.

== See also ==
- Water resources management in Brazil
- Water supply and sanitation in Brazil
