= Vancouver Island fixed link =

Proposed bridge or tunnel in Canada

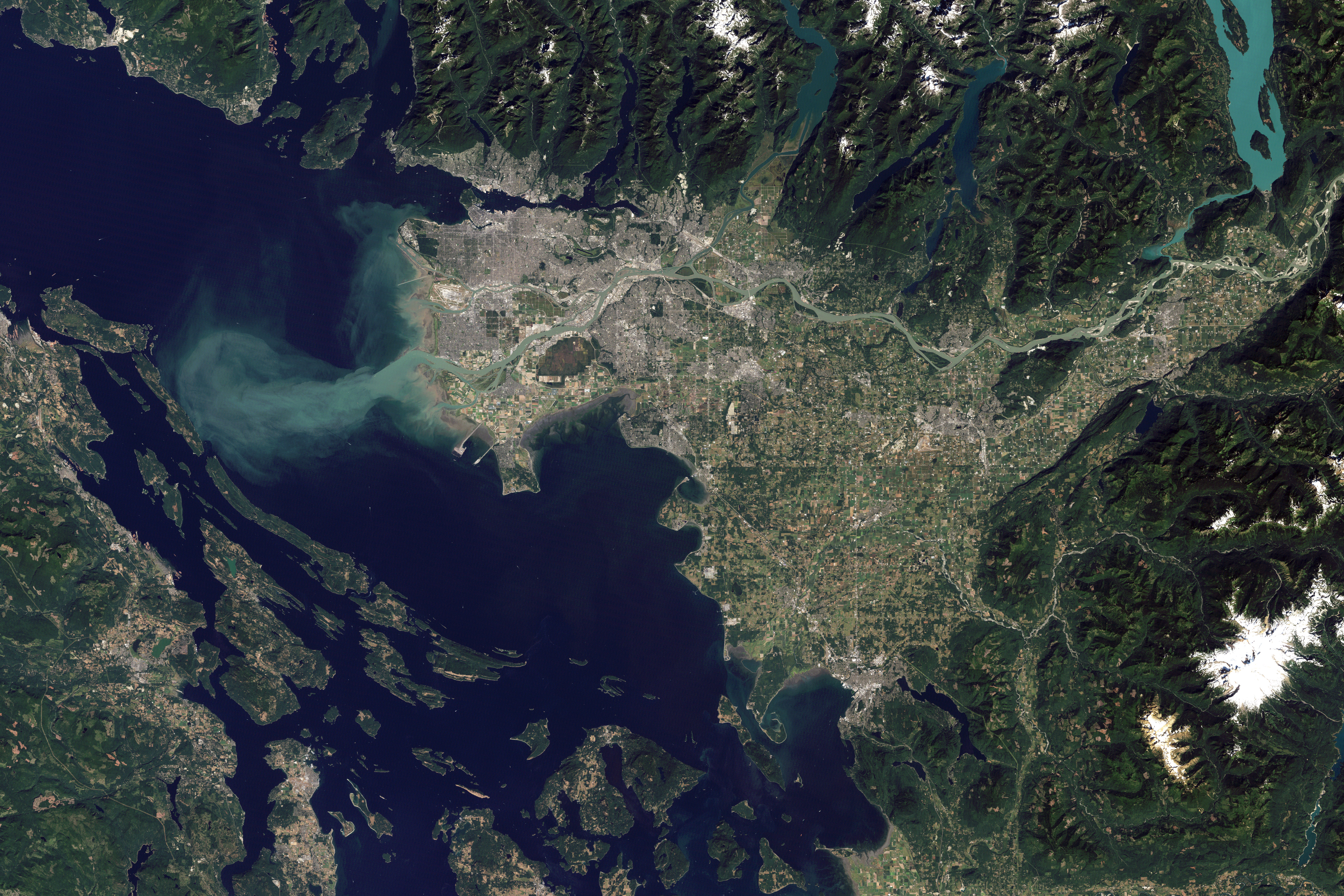
A fixed link between Vancouver Island and the Lower Mainland would likely use one or more of the northern Gulf Islands.

The Vancouver Island fixed link is any of various proposals to construct a fixed link by bridges, tunnels, and/or causeways across the Strait of Georgia, which connects Vancouver Island to the Lower Mainland of British Columbia. The strait has a minimum width of approximately 19 km between Galiano Island and the Tsawwassen Ferry Terminal, but a connection would need to be 26-29 km long to avoid entering US territory.

Supporters see a fixed link as an opportunity to boost tourism and stimulate economic growth on Vancouver Island. Depending on the specific alignment, a fixed link would shorten travel times by replacing one or more of BC Ferries' routes between the island and Lower Mainland. Former B.C. cabinet minister Dr. Patrick McGeer was an outspoken supporter of a fixed link.

== History ==
The idea of constructing a fixed link has existed since the late 1800s, when there was a proposal to link Vancouver Island to the mainland at Bute Inlet.

Public support for a fixed link resurfaced following a strike by employees of CP Steamships and the Black Ball Line in 1958 and the subsequent establishment of BC Ferries in 1960. Support again resurfaced after controversial fare hikes in 1976. This led to a variety of studies to be published examining the feasibility of constructing a fixed link.

A series of controversial fare hikes during the 2008 financial crisis again stoked calls for a fixed link.

== Feasibility ==
Various studies were conducted throughout the 1980s and the 1990s to assess the feasibility of constructing a fixed link between Vancouver Island and the Lower Mainland across the strait. Proposals varied greatly in length and used one or more of the northern Gulf Islands as an anchorage point. Fixed link designs have included a bored tunnel, a submerged floating tunnel, a pontoon bridge, or a floating cable-stayed bridge.

Challenges to establishing a fixed link include the presence of large cargo ships in the area; the depth of the Georgia Strait (up to 365 m deep); the depth of soft sediments found on the ocean bed (up to 450 m thick); potential marine slope instabilities along the eastern side of the strait; extreme wave conditions (4-7 m waves, with 6 m tides and 2-knot current), extreme wind speeds (up to 115 km/h, with gusts up to 180 km/h); seasonal fog, snow, and ice accumulation on the structure; and the high seismic activity of the region. No fixed bridges or tunnels exist in the world that meet these challenging conditions.

=== Bored tunnel ===
A bored tunnel would be excavated underneath the seabed of the Georgia Strait using a tunnel boring machine. One of the world's longest and deepest undersea tunnels is Japan’s Seikan Tunnel, at 54 km in length and 240 m below sea level at its deepest point. Unlike the sedimentary rock that the Seikan Tunnel was constructed through, the soft sediments in the Georgia Strait at a depth of 365 m below sea level would require a bored tunnel to resist extreme pressures during construction, or else tunnel below the sediments at a depth greater than 815 m below sea level. The depth of the water and 450 m-thick sediment layer would require a bored tunnel over 50 km in length.

=== Immersed tube tunnel ===
Immersed tube tunnels are constructed in areas where the seafloor has a suitable profile to be dredged to fit tunnel segments, at water depths typically not exceeding 40 m. The deepest immersed tube tunnel in the world is the Marmaray Tunnel in Turkey, at a depth of 55 m for its 1.4 km long immersed segment, while the longest immersed tube under construction is the Danish-German Fehmarn Belt tunnel at approximately 17 km long and 35 m deep. The Georgia Strait is far deeper than the waterways of immersed tube tunnels constructed so far.

=== Submerged floating tunnel ===
A submerged floating tunnel is a proposed design of tunnel that uses watertight tunnel segments (similar to immersed tubes) that are designed to be neutrally buoyant. No submerged floating tunnels have ever been built, but one across the Georgia Strait would require large gravity anchors that remain immobile in the soft sediment of the seabed with long cables for the depth of the strait, or large pontoons that suspend the tunnel below the water surface. Due to the high marine traffic in the strait, there would be a risk of a catastrophic collision resulting in the loss of the tunnel.

=== Floating pontoon bridge ===
A floating pontoon bridge would sit on the surface of the Georgia Strait, with viaducts or conventional bridges at its ends to allow large vessels to pass underneath. The longest pontoon bridge in the world is the Evergreen Point Floating Bridge in Washington state, with a floating span of 2.35 km, much shorter than the 26 km span length that would be required to cross the strait. The deep sediment layer on the seabed would pose major problems for bridge stability in storms and earthquakes, even with the use of large gravity- and plow-type anchors and cables over 1.2 km long. As with submerged floating tunnels, maritime hazards would also exist. No pontoon bridge built so far is in waters deeper than 100 m or experiences wave forces as severe as those in the Georgia Strait.

=== Floating cable-stayed bridge ===
A floating cable-stayed bridge is a proposed design of bridge that uses towers mounted to floating platforms that are tethered to the seabed with cables and anchors, using similar principles as the tension-leg platforms used for offshore oil and gas production. No floating cable-stayed bridges have ever been built, but one across the Georgia Strait would require large anchors designed for the deep sediment layer at the bottom of the strait and seismic conditions of the region.

== Criticisms and alternatives ==
The cost of a bridge or tunnel between Vancouver Island and the mainland has been cited as a major obstacle. The BC government estimated the construction cost at $15 billion in 2024 Canadian dollars, with one-way tolls of $180 to $800 in 2003 dollars ($284 to $1264 in 2024 dollars). Cost estimates using simpler, conventional bridges suggest construction costs of $22-48 billion, which is not viable given the relatively small population of Vancouver Island and the Lower Mainland.

Opponents argue that improving the speed and reliability of BC Ferries service across the strait would eliminate the need for a fixed link. There are also concerns that the construction of a fixed link will result in further urbanization of the island and that the area's environment will be negatively affected by construction and increased tourism. The idea of a fixed link has formal opposition in the form of an Islands Trust policy banning the building of any bridges or tunnels connecting the Gulf Islands to the Lower Mainland or Vancouver Island.

Turning the city of Nanaimo into a public transit hub has been proposed as an efficient way to leverage services provided by the passenger-only ferry operator Hullo, allowing travellers from Vancouver to quickly get to Victoria without needing a car. Dedicated bus services wouldn't require much infrastructure, while restarting passenger rail along Vancouver Island's east coast was estimated to have a cost of $230-730 million.

== See also ==
- Bering Strait crossing
- Long Island Sound link
- Newfoundland–Labrador fixed link
- Strait of Gibraltar crossing
