= The Fluvarium =

Coordinates: 47°34′47.40″N 52°43′57.40″W

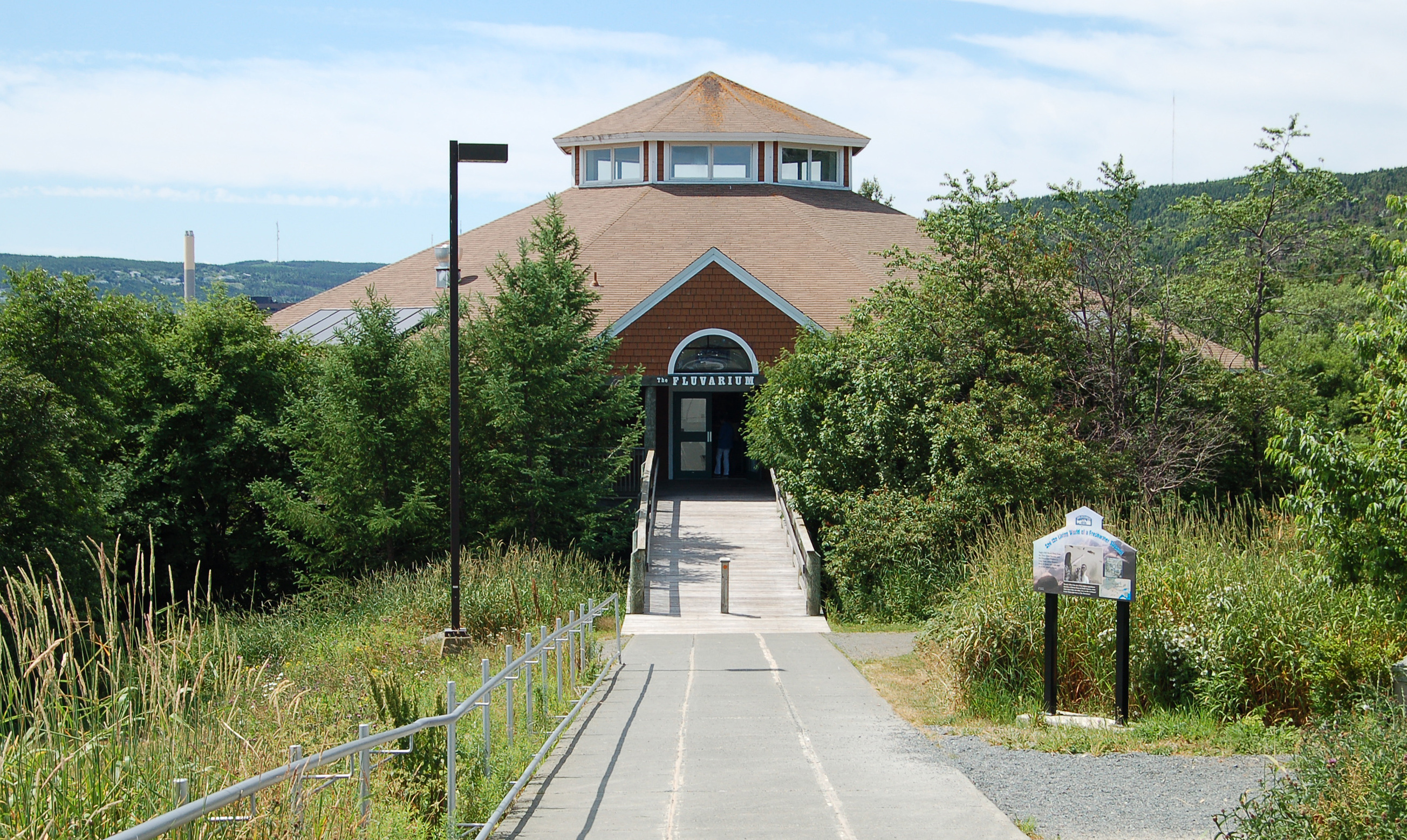
- Interactive map of The Fluvarium
- Date opened: November 1990
- Location: St. John's, Newfoundland, Canada
- Website: www.fluvarium.ca

The Fluvarium, is a public centre for environmental education, located in St. John's, Newfoundland and Labrador, and operated by the Quidi Vidi/Rennie's River Development Foundation. The Quidi Vidi/Rennie's River Development Foundation also operates Lilypad Childcare Center.

The lowest level of the Fluvarium features an underwater view of Nagle's Hill Brook through nine large viewing windows. Visitors can observe brown trout and salmon living in their natural habitat. The center also has a series of natural water aquariums and terrariums that showcase fish and amphibian species found throughout Newfoundland and Labrador.

== History ==
Quidi Vidi/Rennie's River Development Foundation (QVRRDF) was established as a registered non-profit charitable organization in 1985. It was formed by a group of environmentalists and conservationists who were motivated to protect and enhance Rennie’s River, a major waterway flowing through the heart of St. John’s into Quidi Vidi Lake. The QVRRDF started with the goal cleaning up the polluted Rennie’s River and building a walking trail along its meandering path. To clean up Rennie’s River, a series of projects were undertaken including stream stabilization, general environmental restoration, and construction of a fish ladder. Since its inception, over 7.5 km of walking trails, including boardwalks and look-out areas, were completed along the banks of Rennie’s River and around Quidi Vidi Lake.

In 1985, the foundation also received approval by the St. John's City Council to build an interpretation centre at Long Pond with a stream tank to "allow visitors to view, through a glass wall, the surface and bed of the river, where they will be able to observe trout spawning."

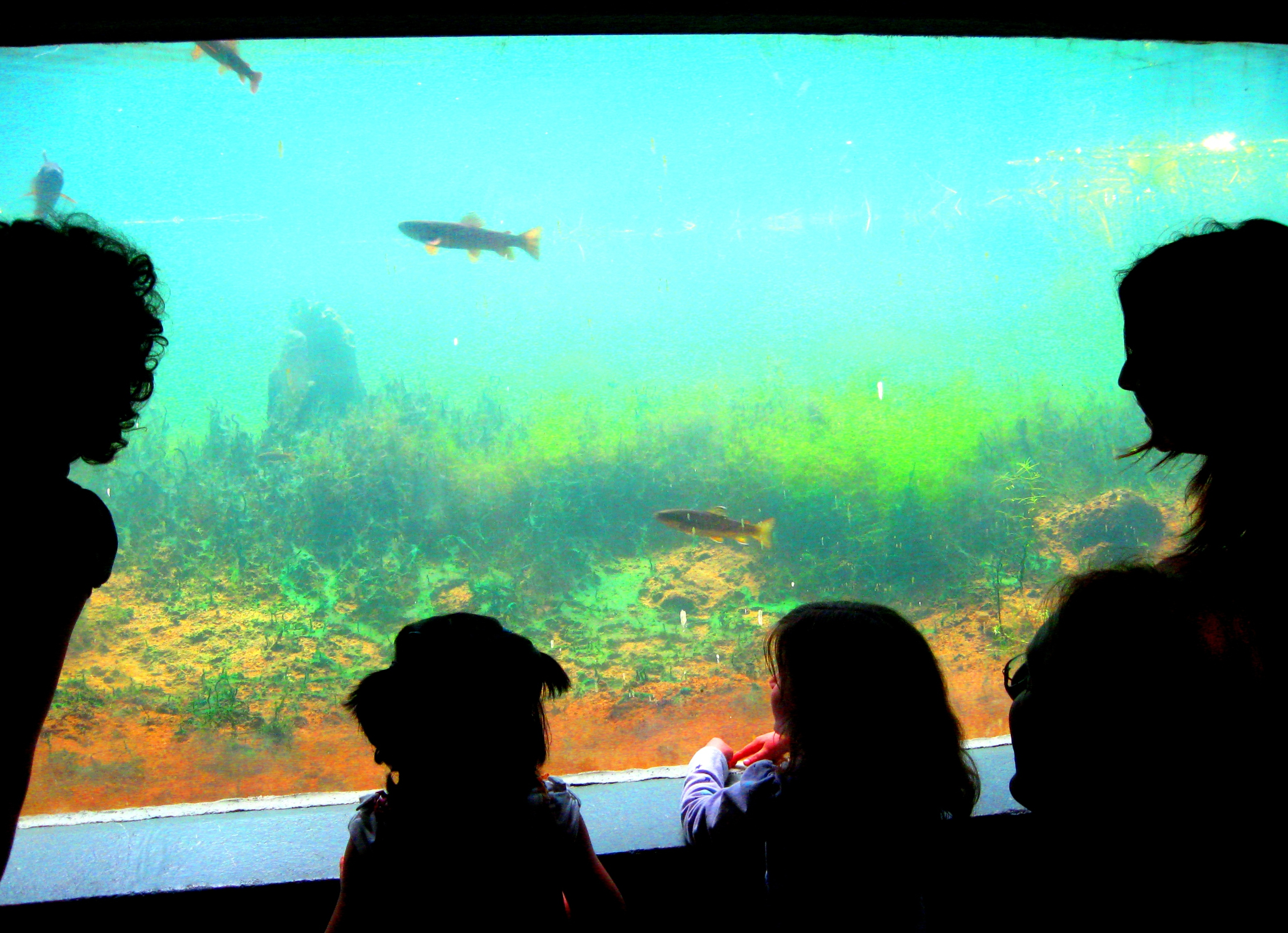
Brown trout swimming outside the Fluvarium

By 1987, the QVRRDF began delivering environmental outreach programs to school children. The program focused on giving children a better understanding of the ecosystem of the river. The foundation spent the majority of 1988 securing funding for the construction of The Fluvarium. In June 1988, Prince Edward "turned the sod" at the site where the centre would be constructed.

In November 1990, The Fluvarium opened to the public with the goal to educate the public and in particular school aged children about the importance of watersheds and how to treat them properly. It was officially opened by The Princess Anne, on July 2, 1991. The opening celebrations included the unveiling of a commemorative plaque, and a tour of the building and grounds.

== Exhibits ==
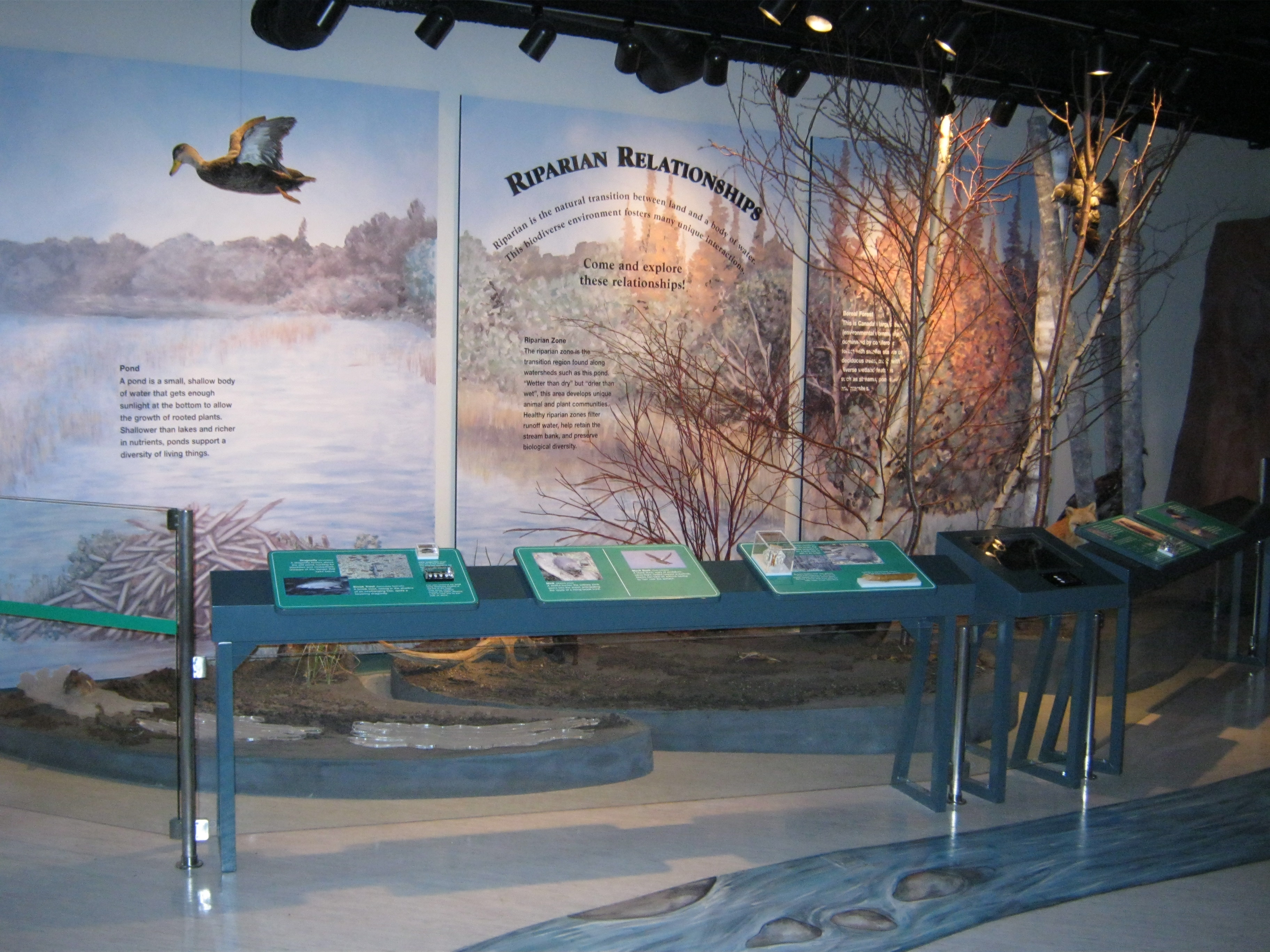
Second floor riparian zone exhibit at The Suncor Energy Fluvarium

=== Water: Past, Present, and Future ===
The second level exhibit area features a view of the Nagle's Hill Brook and has a number of educational exhibits concerning freshwater environments. This includes interactive displays on water, glaciations, wetlands, riparian zones and water monitoring.

=== Fluvarium ===
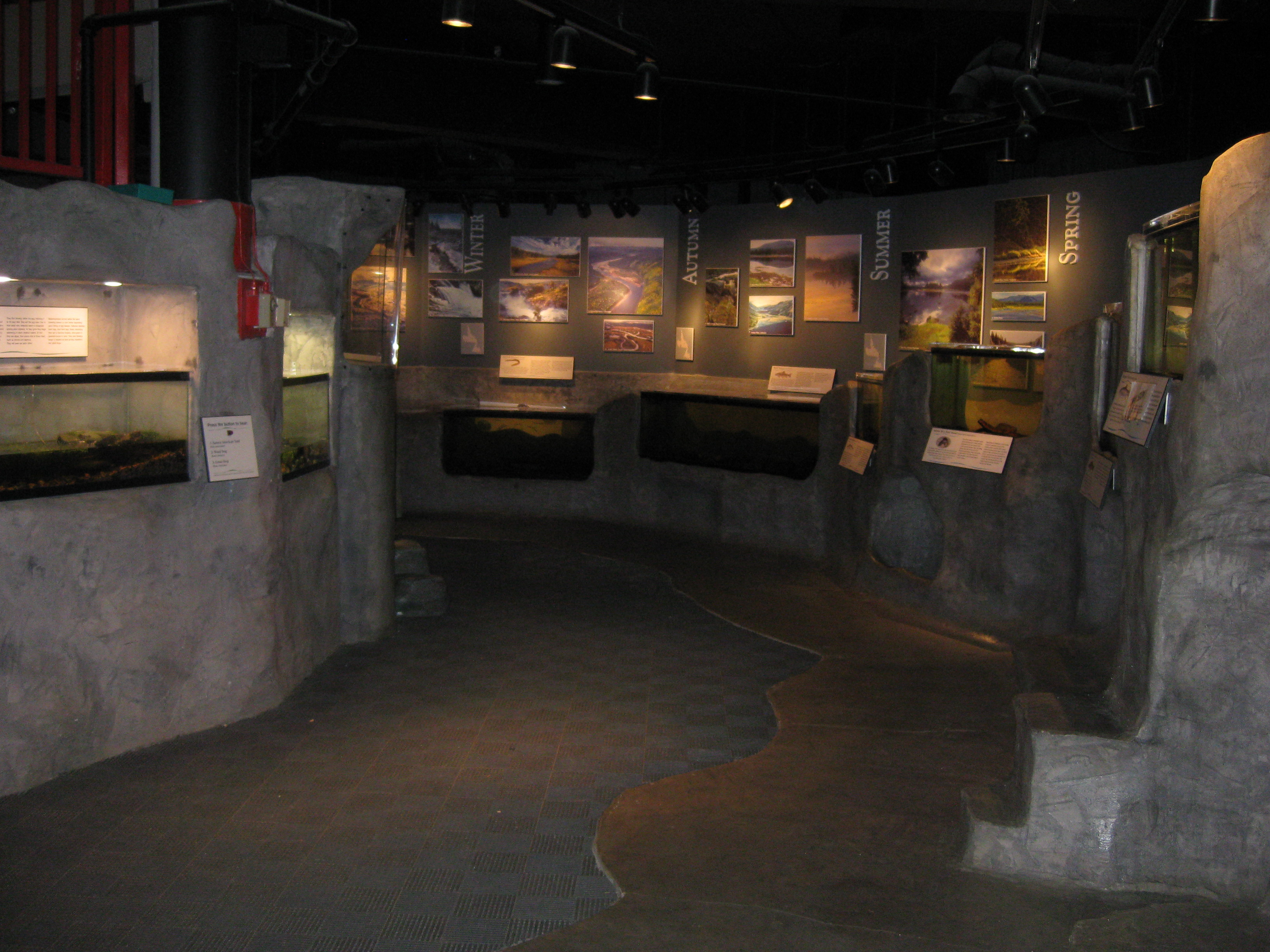
Aquariums featuring freshwater aquatic animals of Newfoundland and Labrador

The Fluvarium level features a panoramic view through nine large viewing windows, into Nagle's Hill Brook. A tributary of Rennie's River, this brook originates 3 kilometers north of The Fluvarium, at Three Pond Barrens. It was diverted to flow past the "windows on a stream" for visitors to explore the life of a river and the ecosystem of which it is part.

The windows allow visitors to see typical areas in a river system, including deep pool, shallow pool and riffle areas. The majority of the fish seen in the brook are brown trout, a species introduced into Newfoundland in 1884. Fish can enter and exit the diverted section using a fish ladder. During the fall, visitors can watch brown trout prepare their nests (redds) and spawn in the riffle areas.

The centre also houses a number of aquariums, fed with stream water from Nagle's Hill Brook. These contain species of typical freshwater fish and amphibians from around Newfoundland and Labrador, including Atlantic salmon, American eels, Arctic char, wood frogs and green frogs.

== Partnerships ==
=== Research ===
The QVRRDF began its first research project at The Fluvarium, March 1992. Research into the pigmentation of rainbow trout flesh using Rhodotorula in prepared diets was investigated in partnership with the Newfoundland and Labrador Institute of Fisheries and Marine Technology Aquaculture Unit.

From 1995-2002, The Fluvarium took part in an Atlantic salmon restocking program in partnership with the Department of Fisheries and Oceans. Salmon eggs were incubated on site and each year about 8000 salmon fry were released into the Rennie's, Waterford and Virginia Rivers.

In 1999, salmon were found in a fish trap at Quidi Vidi Lake. They were believed to be from the first batch of fry released in the system in 1995 and were the first salmon seen in the rivers since the 1930s.

=== Salmon program ===
The Fluvarium continues to play a small part in Atlantic salmon restocking with the Atlantic Salmon Federation's Fish/Friends program. Each spring The Suncor Energy Fluvarium delivers about 1600 salmon eggs to various schools that raise the eggs in special classroom incubators. In the late spring, classes go to The Suncor Energy Fluvarium to release salmon eggs into Nagle's Hill Brook.

== The Duck Race ==
The Annual Rennie's River Duck Race is a popular fundraising event for the Quidi Vidi / Rennie's River Development Foundation that helps to support their environmental initiatives.

An annual tradition since 1988, the event attracts large crowds to the banks of Rennie's River, to watch up to 4800 "sponsored" yellow rubber ducks make their way down the river and through the city, to the finish line. Please visit The Fluvarium's website to learn more.
