= Newfoundland–Labrador fixed link =

Infrastructure proposal in Canada

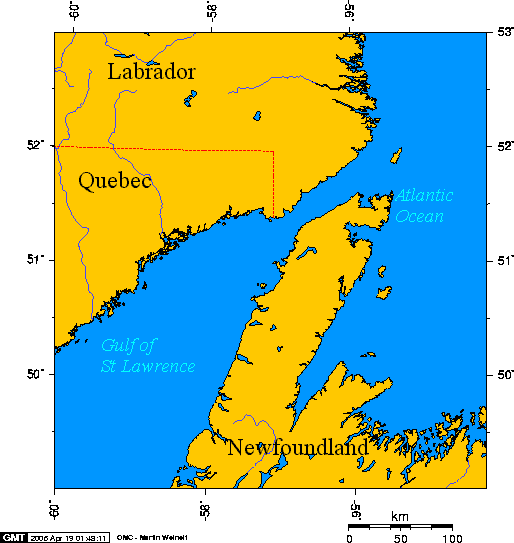
Strait of Belle Isle

The Newfoundland–Labrador fixed link is any of various proposals for constructing a fixed link consisting of a combination of bridges, tunnels, or causeways across the Strait of Belle Isle, connecting the province of Newfoundland and Labrador's mainland Labrador region with the island of Newfoundland. This strait has a minimum width of 17.4 km (9.4 nmi; 10.8 mi).

Labrador and Newfoundland are connected by ferry service between Blanc-Sablon, Quebec (close to the Labrador border) and St. Barbe. However, the most important ferry connection between Newfoundland and mainland Canada is the Marine Atlantic service between Port-aux-Basques and North Sydney, Nova Scotia, a distance of approximately 165 km (89 nmi; 103 mi). This ferry is part of the Trans-Canada Highway.

The idea is not new; it was one of Joey Smallwood's ideas in 1949. It was again put forward by mining engineer Tom Kierans during the early 1970s as a means to bring hydroelectricity from Churchill Falls to Newfoundland. About $75 million was spent by the provincial government on constructing such a utility tunnel, but the project was cancelled in 1975.

The 12.9 km (8.0 mi) Confederation Bridge, which connects Prince Edward Island and New Brunswick, is significantly shorter than the Newfoundland–Labrador link would be, and crosses the Abegweit Passage, a shallower and calmer body of water than the Strait of Belle Isle.

In the lead-up to the October 2003 provincial election, Progressive Conservative leader Danny Williams promised to fund a feasibility study to placate link supporters.

In 2016, Premier Dwight Ball launched a new pre-feasibility study to determine the costs of a tunnel link between the island and Labrador.

In their 2019 election platform, the Liberal Party of Canada indicated support for a National Infrastructure Fund, including the Newfoundland-Labrador fixed transportation link, likely linking Yankee Point, Newfoundland, with Point Amour on the (Labrador) mainland.

In August 2021 the Canada Infrastructure Bank (CIB) and the Newfoundland and Labrador Department of Transportation and Infrastructure signed a memorandum of understanding on the project and are assessing available options.

== 2004 feasibility study ==
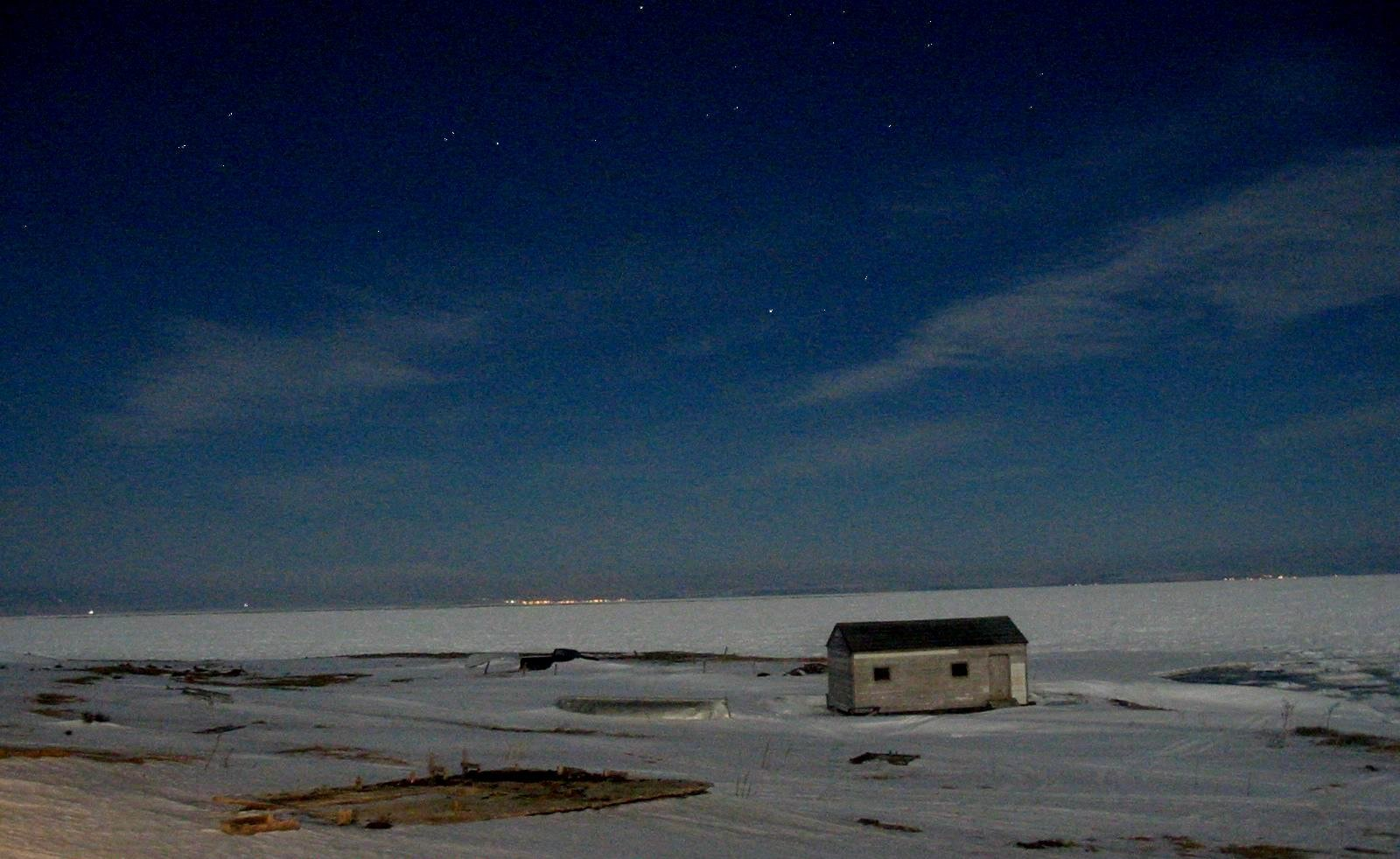
Looking across the Strait of Belle Isle in moonlight from Green Island Brook March 24, 2005. From left to right Point Amour Lighthouse, L'Anse-au-Loup and Capstan Island.

The feasibility study into a Newfoundland–Labrador fixed link, resulting from the 2003 election promise by newly elected premier Danny Williams, was released in 2004. It examined causeway, bridge and tunnel options and recommended that a tunnel beneath the Strait of Belle Isle, accommodating a single railway track, would be the only feasible option, given the area's harsh winter weather conditions, the strait's bathymetry (the depth and shape of the sea floor), and the geology of underlying soils.

Electric-powered trains would be loaded on either side and carry cars, buses and transport trucks, in a manner similar to the Eurotunnel Shuttle between the United Kingdom and France. The authors of the study estimated that construction, either by tunnel boring or lowering pre-constructed tunnel sections to a trench in the sea floor, is beyond the current technological limit due to the depth of the sea floor and scouring of the strait by icebergs.

The authors also stated that the low traffic levels would not justify the cost of construction. Conceivably, if built with federal aid, the 1949 terms of union might be amended to remove federal subsidies from the federally operated Marine Atlantic ferry service that connects Port-aux-Basques with North Sydney, Nova Scotia, and place them instead on the proposed fixed link.

In terms of driving distance, a fixed link would not be favourable for travellers from the Maritimes or parts of the Eastern Seaboard of the United States, as they would have to drive to Quebec City where bridges cross the St. Lawrence River (or one of the ferries further downstream), before continuing east along Quebec's Côte-Nord (of the Gulf of St. Lawrence).

== Highway connections ==
The south coast of Labrador was isolated from the rest of the North American road network until completion of the Trans-Labrador Highway in 2009, and upgrades to its Quebec counterpart Route 389. The eventual completion of Quebec's Route 138 will provide a more direct link between Labrador and the North American road network.

== Revisit in 2016 ==
In 2016, Premier Dwight Ball launched a pre-feasibility study to determine the costs of a tunnel link between the island and Labrador. The study released its results in April 2018 and concluded that a 16 km (10 mi) undersea rail tunnel connecting L'Anse Amour in southern Labrador and Yankee Point near Flower's Cove on the Northern Peninsula of Newfoundland could be constructed at a cost of $1.65 billion. Such a tunnel would take about 15 years to construct, with public-private partnerships strongly recommended for the financing of such a project. In a news conference covering the pre-feasibility study, Ball stated that a fixed link tunnel between Newfoundland and Labrador had the potential to be a "nation-building project" that could "truly change the landscape and unify our country". A formal feasibility study, costing up to $22 million to conduct, is the next step in the process of formulating a plan to construct the fixed link, though there is no timeline on when to commence this study.

== Criticism of the project ==
Business and community leaders in Newfoundland and Labrador and the rest of Canada have spoken out against the project, noting that the economic argument for such a link is not proven. The Economist derided the proposal in a story titled Now let's dig an expensive hole.

== See also ==
- Bering Strait crossing
- Vancouver Island fixed link
