= Thomas Kierans =

Canadian engineer (1913–2013)

Thomas William Kierans
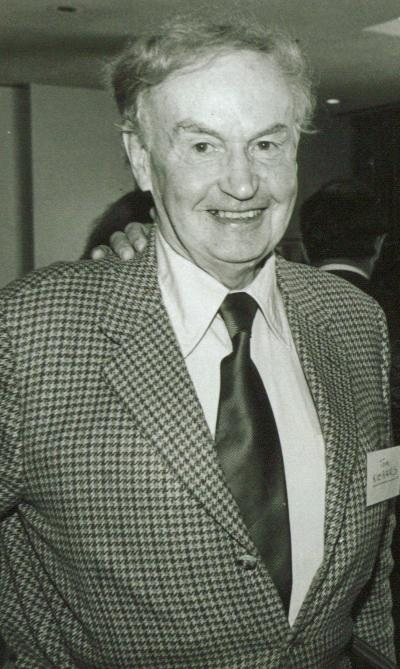
- Born: February 13, 1913; Montreal, Quebec, Canada
- Died: November 22, 2013 (aged 100); St. John's, Newfoundland, Canada
- Education: McGill University
- Engineering career
- Discipline: Mining engineering
- Institutions: Professor of Engineering Memorial University of Newfoundland
- Projects: Great Recycling and Northern Development Canal; Newfoundland–Labrador fixed link; Northumberland Strait Crossing Project

Thomas William Kierans, FCSCE, P. Eng. (February 13, 1913 – November 22, 2013) was an engineer. He was the originator and principal proponent of the Great Recycling and Northern Development Canal or GRAND Canal.

== Early life ==
Kierans was born in Montreal in 1913. In 1939, he graduated in mining engineering from McGill University. As a student he prospected by canoe and bush aircraft across Canada’s northlands. From graduation to 1967, he lived in Sudbury, Ontario, working for eighteen years at Inco mines, smelters and refineries and specializing in industrial safety and rock mechanics. From 1957 to 1967, he was a mining and water resources consulting engineer and visited most mines in Canada twice each year. That experience led him to decide that his eventual home would be in St. John’s, Newfoundland.

== Engineering career ==
Kierans recognized the increasing "greenhouse effects" since the 1930s “dust bowl” were a clear indication that fast-growing Canadian and United States populations would require a new, large, controllable, environment-friendly source of fresh water to stabilize shared Great Lakes and St. Lawrence River water levels and flows and to end widespread and worsening water deficits and flooding in both countries. To meet this need, Kierans used proven Dutch and Californian experience to design his Great Recycling and Northern Development Canal concept in the 1950s. This would recycle (not divert) some of the now huge and harmful run-off to Canada’s Hudson Bay to the Great Lakes from a new sea-level freshwater dike-enclosure in James Bay. This should substantially increase Canada’s freshwater supply and improve Hudson Bay and east coast environments, fisheries and shipping. However, despite Quebec’s past Premier Bourassa’s and prominent engineering groups’ endorsement of detailed study of his concept, as well as an invitation to outline it to the American Society of Civil Engineers in 2001, some Canadian authorities unfortunately fail to understand basic differences between run-off recycling as opposed to potentially harmful headwater diversions or simply fear any joint water management with the US.

In 1967, he was invited by project owner CFLCo to be the mining engineer responsible for underground design at the 5500MW Churchill Falls Hydropower Project in Labrador. His duties were expanded to include project safety and environment protection. He organized detailed studies on the environmental impacts of diverting some of the Naskaupi River headwaters to the project’s Smallwood Reservoir.

In 1973, he was appointed Professor of Engineering at Memorial University of Newfoundland (MUN). While at MUN he worked with Newfoundland and Labrador Hydro on the 1975 attempt at a hydropower only crossing of the Strait of Belle Isle, chaired the Environmental Committee on Brinco’s Kitts-Michelin uranium project, and was on the Editorial Board of the American Society Of Civil Engineers’ Manual on Nuclear Structures And Materials. In 1978, he proposed comprehensive underground and surface development of St. John’s Southside Hills and founded Friends Of St. John’s Harbour, the first public group to promote the much-needed clean-up of that historic Canadian seaport. He was the founding chairman of the Newfoundland and Labrador Peat Association and worked with MUN and several industry representatives to initiate the University’s Seabright Corporation cooperation with industry.

In 1978, he retired from MUN to be the Director of the Alexander Graham Bell Institute at the University College of Cape Breton.

In 1983, he founded Deltaport Limited to create a very large, mid-ocean, floating, sea and air base using tetrahedral space frames. A floating dock built for such research on the MUN side of St. John’s Long Pond is still in use for recreational purposes. From 1989 to 1991 he was technical advisor to Environment Canada for the Northumberland Strait Crossing Project. He was a life member of the Professional Engineers and Geoscientists of Newfoundland and Labrador (PEG-NL), Canadian Society of Civil Engineers (CSCE), the Canadian Institute of Mining and Metallurgy, and other professional groups. He was awarded PEG-NL’s Order Of Merit for 2000 and in 2001 received a CSCE fellowship. In his later years he wrote three websites that reflected his interest in large-scale joint North American water management, floating mid-ocean sea-air bases, and the proposed Newfoundland-Labrador fixed link.

== Personal ==
He was the father of nine children and a citizen of both Canada and Ireland. Thomas Kierans died on the morning of November 22, 2013. He was 100 years old.
