= Sun Belt Water =

Sun Belt Water Inc.
- Industry: Transportation
- Founded: March 1990; 35 years ago
- Headquarters: Santa Barbara, California, United States
- Website: sunbeltwater.com

Sun Belt Water Inc. is an American water transportation company based in Santa Barbara, California.

Sun Belt Water is better known for filing a lawsuit against Canada for $10.5 billion US over access to BC Water.

== History ==
Sun Belt Water, Inc. was organized as a California C-corp in March 1990 for the purpose of responding to the invitation from the British Columbia government to invest in the new and emerging industry to export the BC surplus water by marine transport systems.

In October 1999, the company filed a North American Free Trade Agreement (NAFTA) Chapter 11 Notice of Claim and Demand for Arbitration with the United Nations Commission on International Trade Law (UNCITRAL) against the government of Canada for a dispute regarding access to water from the province of British Columbia. The issue of water exports has a high level of political sensitivity in Canada and public interest groups are opposed to the issue. In 1999, Sun Belt Water. Inc. abandoned its case in Canada's court system and filed an Arbitration claim against Canada under Chapter 11 of the NAFTA claiming access of fresh water from Canada or damages of $995 million.

Sun Belt Water, Inc. v. Government of Canada

Sun Belt Water, Inc., a United States company, served the Government of Canada with a 'Notice of Intent to Submit a Claim to Arbitration' in November 1998. No valid claim has been filed. There is no Chapter Eleven arbitration on this matter. (link below)
