= Submerged floating tunnel =

Tunnel that floats underwater

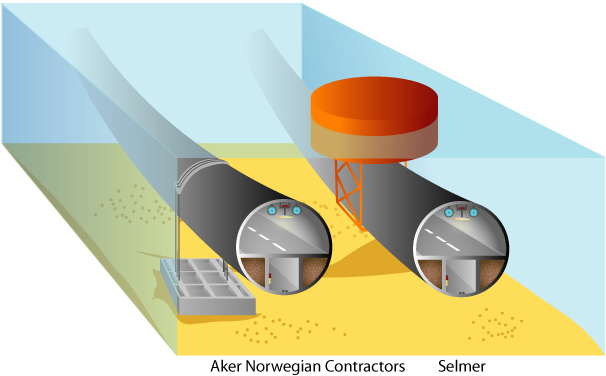
Submerged floating tunnels can be anchored to the seafloor (left) or suspended from a pontoon (right)

A submerged floating tunnel (SFT), also known as submerged floating tube bridge (SFTB), suspended tunnel, or Archimedes bridge, is a proposed design for a tunnel that floats in water, supported by its buoyancy (specifically, by employing the hydrostatic thrust, or Archimedes' principle).

The tube would be placed underwater, deep enough to avoid water traffic and weather, but not so deep that high water pressure needs to be dealt with; usually a depth of 20 to 50 m (66 to 164 ft) is sufficient. Cables either anchored to the seabed or to pontoons on the surface would prevent it from floating to the surface or submerging, respectively.

== Construction ==
Diagram of the buoyancy effect

The concept of submerged floating tunnels is based on well-known technology applied to floating bridges and offshore structures, but the construction is mostly similar to that of immersed tunnels: After the tube is prefabricated in sections in a dry dock and the sections are moved to the site, one way is to first seal the sections; sink them into place, while sealed; and, when the sections are fixed to each other, break the seals. Another possibility is to leave the sections unsealed, and after welding them together at the site, pump the water out.

The ballast is calculated so that the structure has approximate hydrostatic equilibrium (that is, the tunnel is roughly the same overall density as water), whereas immersed tube tunnels are ballasted to achieve negative buoyancy so they tend to remain on the sea bed. This, of course, means that a submerged floating tunnel must be anchored to the ground or to the water surface to keep it in place, depending on the buoyancy of the submerged floating tunnel: slightly positive or negative, respectively.

== Applications ==
Water-spanning structures: 1. Suspension bridge; 2. Submerged floating tunnel; 3. Immersed tube; 4. Undersea tunnel

Submerged floating tubes allow construction of a tunnel in extremely deep water, where conventional bridges or tunnels are technically difficult or prohibitively expensive. They would be able to deal with seismic disturbances and weather events easily, as they have some degree of freedom in regards to movement, and their structural performance is independent of length (that is, it can be very long without compromising its stability and resistance).

On the other hand, they may be vulnerable in regards to anchors or submarine traffic, which therefore has to be taken in consideration when building one.

Likely applications include fjords, deep, narrow sea channels, and deep lakes.

== Proposals ==
As of 2016, a submerged floating tunnel has never been built, but several proposals have been presented by different entities.

Date	Place	Country	Proposer	link
1886	Patent N.9558	United Kingdom	Sir Edward James Reed	
1890	Patent N.447735	United States	H. Moeser	
1905	Patent N.357983	France	M.F. Hennebique	
1907	Patent N.862288	United States	H.O.Smith	
1923	Patent "dykket pontonbro"	Norway	Trygve Olsen	
1947	patent "«neddykket, flytende tunnel til kryssing av fjordløp" pending nr. 91699	Norway	Erik Ødegård	
1960	Patent N.1262386	France	M.F. Cristaldi	
1969	Strait of Messina	Italy	Alan Grant	
1980	Vancouver Island (Vancouver Island fixed link)	Canada	Ministry of Transportation of British Columbia, Canada	
1984	Como Lake	Italy	G.Magrini	
1998	Høgsfjorden	Norway	Norwegian Public Roads Administration	
2003	Transatlantic tunnel	—N/a	Discovery Channel's Extreme Engineering (Season 1, episode 3)	
2011	Sognefjord	Norway	Norwegian Public Road Administration	
2016	Bjørnafjord	Norway	Norwegian Public Road Administration	
2017	Multiple potential sites	—N/a	Hyperloop One	
?	Funka Bay, Hokkaido	Japan	Society of Submerged Floating Tunnel Technology	
?	Lake Washington, Seattle	United States	James Felch / Subterra, Inc.	
?	Lugano Lake	Switzerland		
2018	Cook Strait	New Zealand	Stuff.co.nz journalists	
?	Garda Lake	Italy	Giacomo Cis Onlus committee	
2021	Irish Sea	United Kingdom	Boris Johnson	

=== Europe ===
In Norway, a first patent on this structure was presented in 1923 by Trygve Olsen ("Submerged pontoon bridge") and a new request was done in 1947 by the engineer Erik Ødegård. The interest has been revived during the last centuries with several studies in Norway, but it is just with the studies done by the Norwegian Public Road Administration (NPRA) that the feasibility of the structure is proven, with the recent developments of the offshore structures. The Norwegian Public Roads Administration (NPRA) has investigated the technical and economic potential for eliminating all ferries on fjord crossings along the western corridor (European route E39) between Kristiansand and Trondheim. This project also linked with FEHRL through the Forever Open Road programme. If the project were to proceed it estimated to cost $25 billion and be completed by 2050.

Ponte di Archimede International, an Italian company, investigated the SFT in collaboration with the Norwegian Roads Research Laboratory, the Danish Road Institute and the Italian Shipping Register, with a financial grant from the European Union and the coordination of FEHRL (Forum European National Highway Research Laboratories) an International Association of over 30 National Road Centres. Furthermore, the Provincial Administrations of Como (Como Lake) and Lecco, in Italy, have officially shown great interest in the Archimedes' Bridge for crossing the Lario and the study of the submerged floating tunnel in the Strait of Messina has been promoted by Ponte di Archimede S.p.A. and verified with a feasibility analysis by the Italian Naval Register (RINA).

=== China ===
The SIJLAB (Sino-Italian Joint Laboratory of Archimedes' Bridge), created in 1998, between Institute of Mechanics, Chinese Academy of Sciences, China and Ponte di Archimede S.p.A., is financed by the Italian Ministry of Foreign Affairs, the Chinese Ministry of Science and Technology and the Institute of Mechanics of the Chinese Academy of Sciences.

The consortium planned to build a 100m demonstration tunnel in Qiandao Lake in China eastern province of Zhejiang. Inside it, two layers of one-way motorways will run through in the middle, with two railway tracks flanking them. It was later reported that the pilot project would now be a tourist observation tunnel to allow undisturbed viewing of the ruins of flooded Hecheng city, which are currently only viewable by scuba diving. The Qiandao Lake prototype will serve to help plan for the project of a 3,300-meter submerged floating tunnel in the Jintang Strait, in the Zhoushan archipelago, also situated in Zhejiang.

According to Elio Matacena, the President of Ponte di Archimede International, the only difficulty building such tunnels in deeper waters is the price of the structure. Namely, the cables, which are very expensive, would be very long. He also notes that the tunnel is capable of supporting more weight than a traditional bridge, which has very strict weight limits, while being up to two times cheaper. Matacena points out that environmental studies show that the tunnel would have a very low impact on aquatic life.

=== Indonesia ===
Indonesia has also expressed interest in the technology. For the infrastructure that would connect Sumatra to Java Island two options were explored: a conventional bridge or an undersea tunnel.

In 2004 the tunnel option was more widely discussed, especially when Kwik Kian Gie, then the Minister of National Development, announced that a European consortium was interested in investing in an undersea tunnel between Java and Sumatra. The budget was said to be around 15 billion US dollars for an undersea tunnel in the Sunda Strait; in the long term it would link up Java and Sumatra in an uninterrupted chain. The project was to begin construction in 2005 and be ready to use by 2018, and was a part of the Asian Highway.

However, the bridge option was later favored.

In 2007, Indonesian experts, led by Ir. Iskendar, Director for the Center of Assessment and Application of Technology for Transportation System and Industries, participated in a meeting with SIJLAB engineers, from the Sino-Italian Archimedes Bridge project. As an archipelagic country, consisting of more than 13 thousand islands, Indonesia could benefit from such tunnels. Conventional transportation between islands is mainly by ferry. Submerged floating tunnels could thus be an alternative means to connect adjacent islands, in addition to normal bridges.

== See also ==
- Immersed tube
