= Long Pond (St. John's) =

Pond in St. John's, Newfoundland and Labrador, Canada

Coordinates: 47.578°N 52.733°W

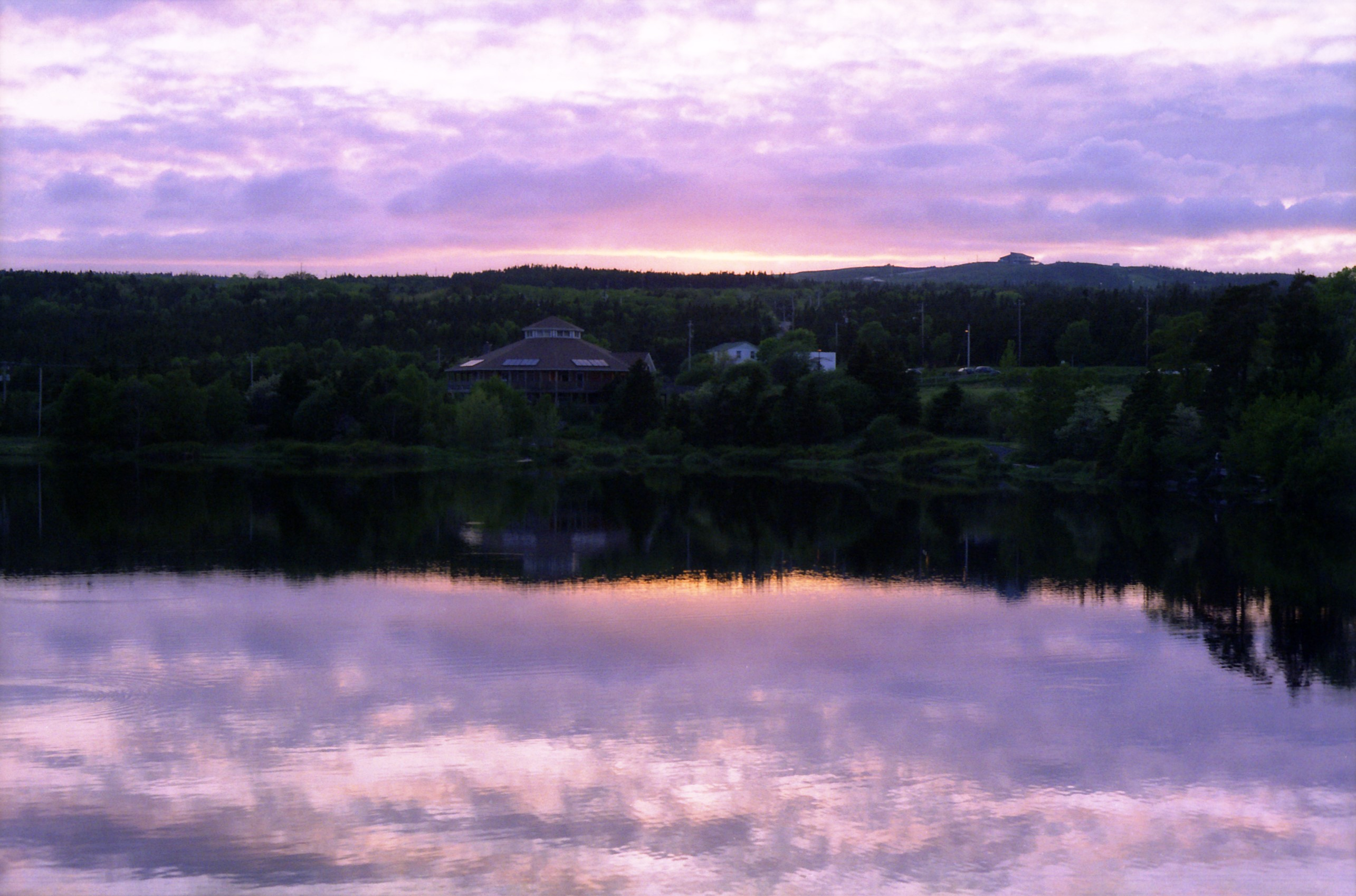
Long Pond, on the campus of Memorial University of Newfoundland

Long Pond is a lake in St. John's, Newfoundland and Labrador, Canada. It is next to Prince Philip Drive (the parkway) near the St. John's Arts and Culture Centre, and the Fluvarium is on the opposite side of the pond. It sports a walking trail around its shore, of which a small percentage is the Prince Philip Drive sidewalk; and a turnoff trail on the Fluvarium side leads to Mount Scio Road.
