= Wreck Cove, Nova Scotia =

Community in Nova Scotia, Canada

Wreck Cove in Nova Scotia

Wreck Cove is a small community in the Canadian province of Nova Scotia, located in Victoria County on Cape Breton Island. The early settlers who received land grants in Wreck Cove included Alexander McKenzie in 1839, John Morrison in 1868, and Norman McLeod in 1871.

Wreck Cove had a population of 79 people in 1956.

Nova Scotia Power operates a hydroelectric power plant in Wreck Cove.

== Climate ==
Climate data for Wreck Cove, Nova Scotia
Month	Jan	Feb	Mar	Apr	May	Jun	Jul	Aug	Sep	Oct	Nov	Dec	Year
Record high °C (°F)	17.0 (62.6)	18.0 (64.4)	17.0 (62.6)	24.5 (76.1)	29.5 (85.1)	35.6 (96.1)	34.0 (93.2)	36.5 (97.7)	33.0 (91.4)	27.0 (80.6)	24.0 (75.2)	17.0 (62.6)	36.5 (97.7)
Mean daily maximum °C (°F)	−1.8 (28.8)	−2.0 (28.4)	1.3 (34.3)	5.9 (42.6)	12.8 (55.0)	18.3 (64.9)	22.5 (72.5)	22.6 (72.7)	18.4 (65.1)	12.2 (54.0)	6.5 (43.7)	1.4 (34.5)	9.8 (49.6)
Daily mean °C (°F)	−5.7 (21.7)	−6.2 (20.8)	−2.6 (27.3)	2.3 (36.1)	8.2 (46.8)	13.4 (56.1)	17.8 (64.0)	18.1 (64.6)	14.1 (57.4)	8.3 (46.9)	3.4 (38.1)	−1.8 (28.8)	5.8 (42.4)
Mean daily minimum °C (°F)	−9.6 (14.7)	−10.4 (13.3)	−6.5 (20.3)	−1.3 (29.7)	3.6 (38.5)	8.5 (47.3)	13.2 (55.8)	13.5 (56.3)	9.8 (49.6)	4.5 (40.1)	0.2 (32.4)	−5.0 (23.0)	1.7 (35.1)
Record low °C (°F)	−28.5 (−19.3)	−29.0 (−20.2)	−25.0 (−13.0)	−14.0 (6.8)	−5.0 (23.0)	−3.0 (26.6)	3.0 (37.4)	3.0 (37.4)	−1.1 (30.0)	−5.0 (23.0)	−14.4 (6.1)	−20.0 (−4.0)	−29.0 (−20.2)
Average precipitation mm (inches)	224.4 (8.83)	162.3 (6.39)	167.0 (6.57)	174.5 (6.87)	111.3 (4.38)	102.2 (4.02)	103.3 (4.07)	122.2 (4.81)	165.1 (6.50)	209.9 (8.26)	201.3 (7.93)	202.9 (7.99)	1,946.3 (76.63)
Average rainfall mm (inches)	107.3 (4.22)	70.0 (2.76)	94.8 (3.73)	134.4 (5.29)	109.1 (4.30)	102.2 (4.02)	103.3 (4.07)	122.2 (4.81)	165.1 (6.50)	209.1 (8.23)	179.3 (7.06)	122.2 (4.81)	1,549 (60.98)
Average snowfall cm (inches)	113.8 (44.8)	92.5 (36.4)	65.6 (25.8)	31.5 (12.4)	2.0 (0.8)	0.0 (0.0)	0.0 (0.0)	0.0 (0.0)	0.0 (0.0)	0.4 (0.2)	24.2 (9.5)	86.9 (34.2)	416.8 (164.1)
Source: Environment Canada
