= North American Water and Power Alliance =

Proposed interlinking of Canadian and American rivers

Map of the NAWAPA project (right), as compared with the GRAND, a continental water management scheme of similar scale.

The North American Water and Power Alliance (NAWPA or NAWAPA; also referred to as NAWAPTA, after the proposed governing body, the North American Water and Power Treaty Authority) was a proposed continental water management scheme conceived in the 1950s by the US Army Corps of Engineers. The planners envisioned diverting water from some rivers in Alaska south through Canada via the Rocky Mountain Trench and other routes to the US, entailing 369 separate construction projects. The water would enter the US in northern Montana. There, it would be diverted to the headwaters of rivers such as the Colorado and the Yellowstone. Implementation of NAWAPA has not been seriously considered since the 1970s, due to the array of environmental, economic, and diplomatic issues raised by the proposal. Western historian William deBuys wrote that "NAWAPA died a victim of its own grandiosity."

== The plan ==
A technical and economic blueprint for the plan was developed in 1964 by the Parsons Corporation of Pasadena, California. The total cost was estimated in 1975 as $100 billion, comparable in cost to the Interstate Highway System.

=== Water management ===
The Parsons plan would divert water from the Yukon, Liard and Peace River systems into the southern half of the Rocky Mountain Trench which would be dammed into a massive, 500 mi (805 km)-long reservoir. Some of the water would be sent east across central Canada to form a navigable waterway connecting Alberta to the Great Lakes with the additional benefit of stabilizing the Great Lakes' water level. The rest of the water would enter the United States in northern Montana, providing additional flow to the Columbia and Missouri–Mississippi river systems, and would be pumped over the Rocky Mountains via the Sawtooth Lifts in Idaho. From there, it would run south via aqueducts to the Colorado River and Rio Grande systems. Some of this water would be sent around the southern end of the Rockies in New Mexico and pumped north to the High Plains, stabilizing the Ogallala Aquifer. The increased flow of the Colorado River, meanwhile, would enter Mexico, allowing for greater development of agriculture in Baja California and Sonora.

The project would provide 75 million acre-feet (93 km^{3}) of water to water-deficient areas in the North American continent, including Canada and the United States, as well as irrigation water for Mexico, which Parsons claimed would receive enough water to reclaim 7 or 8 times more land than Egypt reclaimed with the Aswan High Dam. It would provide increased water flow in the upper Missouri and Mississippi rivers during periods of low flow, increased hydropower generation along the Columbia River, and stabilize water levels in the Great Lakes. Parsons originally proposed using peaceful nuclear explosions to excavate trenches and underground water storage reservoirs for the system.

=== Power generation ===
The project would generate a vast amount of electricity from a number of hydroelectric and nuclear power facilities (the latter of which would be required to power the multiple pumping stations needed to move the water across the continent). The issue of electricity generation created some controversy, with some commentators such as Marc Reisner arguing that the plan would be a net consumer of energy, while others estimated a net gain of 60 to 80 million kilowatts after meeting the needs for pumping.

=== Transportation ===
The plan would potentially have included a navigable waterway in Canada from Alberta to Lake Superior, to be called the Transcontinental Canal. In addition to increasing availability of water, the canal would address problems of water pollution.

== Environmental impacts ==
The engineering of the project and the creation of a large number of new reservoirs — many of them in designated wilderness areas — would have destroyed vast areas of wildlife habitat in Canada and the American West and would have required the relocation of hundreds of thousands of people — including the entire city of Prince George, British Columbia. A number of federally designated Wild and Scenic Rivers in Idaho and Montana would be submerged under reservoirs, including the Salmon, Lochsa, Clearwater, Yellowstone and Big Hole. The amount of electricity required to pump the water over the Rockies would require the construction of as many as six nuclear power plants. Significant negative consequences were also predicted for Pacific salmon runs in the many Alaskan and Canadian rivers that would be dammed and diverted, reducing their flows. Luna Leopold, a conservationist and professor of hydrology at the University of California, Berkeley said of NAWAPA, "The environmental damage that would be caused by that damned thing can't even be described. It would cause as much harm as all of the dam-building we have done in a hundred years."

== Reception ==
NAWAPA garnered early support from some Western political figures, who viewed its promise of increased water supplies as key to continued growth in the Western United States. In 1966, Congressman Jim Wright, in his book, The Coming Water Famine, wrote that "NAWAPA has an almost limitless potential if we possess the courage and the foresight to grasp it." In 1967, Senator Frank Moss of Utah wrote The Water Crisis, in which he called NAWAPA the most comprehensive water diversion proposal to solve supply and pollution problems. (Moss was later hired by the Parsons Corporation and retained as a lobbyist.) Los Angeles County Supervisor Mike Antonovich called for Los Angeles to back the plan. The Corps of Engineers studied this project in the 1950s and 1960s, but no official proposal was ever developed. Canadian Prime Minister Lester Pearson was quoted in 1966 saying of the plan that “This can be one of the most important developments in our history."

In the 1970s, the plan began to encounter fierce opposition by a number of different groups on both sides of the border, based on concerns with its financial and environmental costs and the international implications of exporting Canadian water. The environmental movement, which viewed the plan as the "hydrologic anti-Christ," gained momentum in the early 1970s, and is credited with playing a major role in halting the project. After initially expressing support for NAWAPA as Interior Secretary in the 1960s, Stewart Udall publicly ridiculed the plan after leaving office. The project was opposed by public sentiment in Canada, though Canadian financier Simon Reisman, who negotiated the Free Trade Agreement, the precursor to the North American Free Trade Agreement, was one of its backers and main promoters. Nonetheless, the Canadian position on free trade exempted water exports, in part specifically to pre-empt any attempted completion of Reisman's long-time pet project. The NAWAPA Foundation, which Parsons had founded to promote the scheme, closed its doors in 1990.

Environmental writer Marc Reisner noted in Cadillac Desert that the plan was one of "brutal magnificence" and "unprecedented destructiveness." Historian Ted Steinberg suggested that NAWAPA summed up "the sheer arrogance and imperial ambitions of the modern hydraulic West" and credited rising costs and the rise of the environmental movement with killing the idea. One author called it "the most outlandish water development scheme to emerge in the past 50 years".

Beginning in 1982, some efforts were made to revive the plan, including by Parsons engineer Roland Kelley, who authored a report called NAWAPA Plan Can Work. The LaRouche movement has supported the project, making efforts to revive NAWAPA in 1982 and again in 2010.

== See also ==
- Great Recycling and Northern Development Canal
- International Joint Commission
- Boundary Waters Treaty of 1909
- Columbia River Treaty
- North American Union
- Cadillac Desert
- South–North Water Transfer Project of China
- Northern river reversal
