= MV Northern Ranger =

Ferry

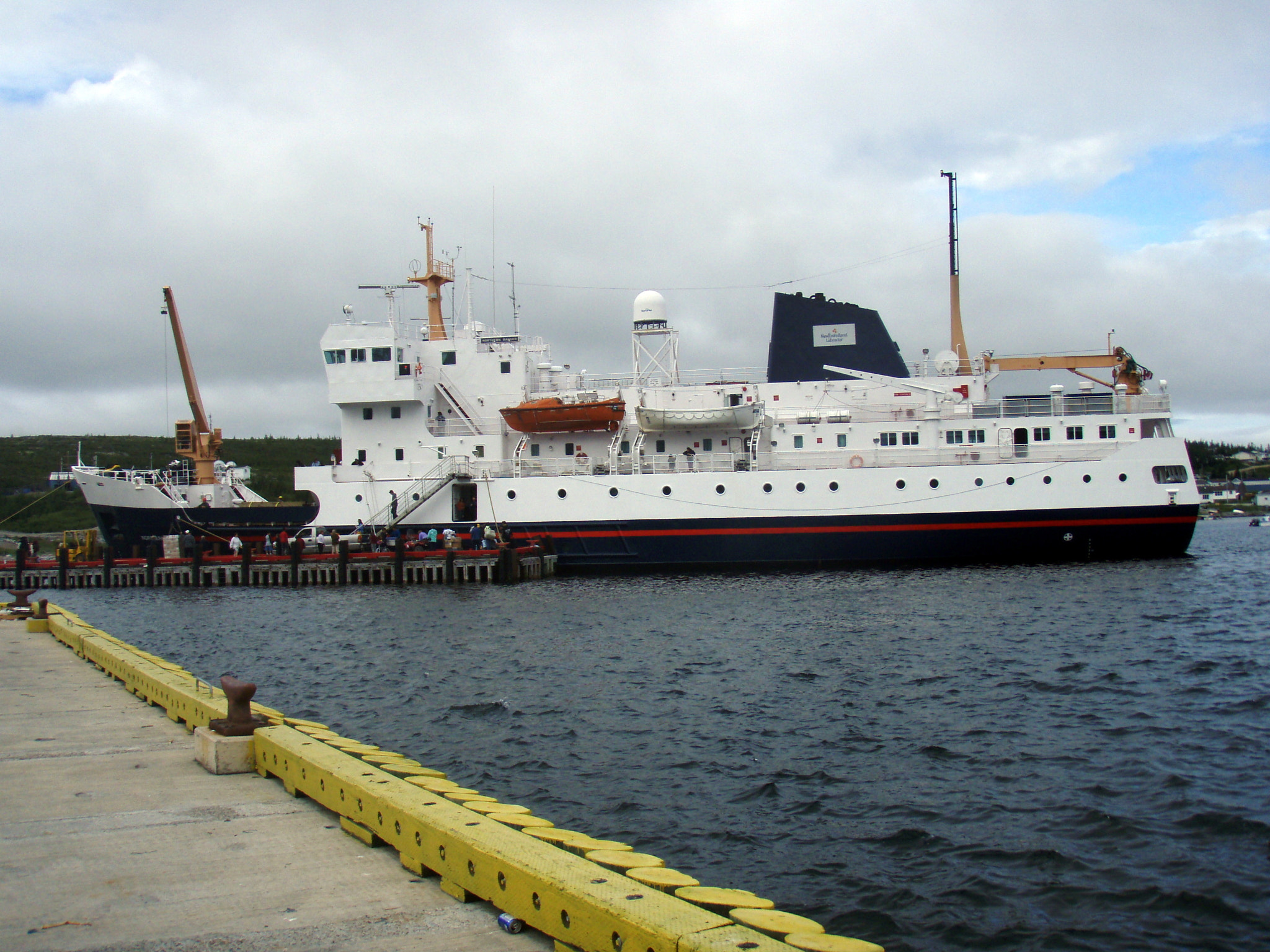

History
- Name: Northern Ranger
- Namesake: SS Northern Ranger
- Owner: Fortuna Ltd
- Operator: Fortuna Ltd
- Port of registry: (Canada) St. John's, Newfoundland and Labrador
- Builder: Port Weller Dry Docks, St. Catharines, Ontario
- Cost: $18 million
- Yard number: 75
- Launched: June 11, 1986
- Christened: October 1986
- Out of service: 2021
- Identification: IMO number: 8512504; MMSI number: 316001100
- Status: Under refit
- Notes: Current location: Hull, UK.

General characteristics
- Type: Ice-breaking coastal ferry
- Tonnage: 2,556 GT; 662 DWT
- Length: 71.9 m (235 ft 11 in) oa; 65.0 m (213 ft 3 in) pp
- Beam: 15.7 m (51 ft 6 in)
- Draught: 4.25 m (13 ft 11 in)
- Propulsion: Diesel engine, 1 screw
- Speed: 14.5 knots (26.9 km/h; 16.7 mph)
- Capacity: 131 passengers; 100 tons cargo
- Crew: 21

MV Northern Ranger is a Canadian ice-breaking coastal ferry formerly operating in Newfoundland and Labrador. The ship entered service in 1986 for coastal service in Labrador. The vessel provided service between Nain, Newfoundland and Labrador and Lewisporte, Newfoundland, stopping at points between. The ferry was owned and operated by the federal crown corporation Marine Atlantic and subsequently the province of Newfoundland and Labrador. At the end of 2018, the ship was taken out of service and replaced by a newer vessel on the route between Nain and Happy Valley-Goose Bay. The ship was sold to Fortuna Ltd in 2025 to fulfil a concession to act as a supply and passenger vessel for Tristan da Cunha, and is scheduled to enter service from Cape Town in 2027.

== Description ==
Northern Ranger is 71.9 m (235 ft 11 in) long overall and 65.0 m (213 ft 3 in) between perpendiculars with a 2,556 gross tonnage (GT) and a 662 tons deadweight (DWT). The ferry has a beam of 15.7 m (51 ft 6 in) and a draught of 4.25 m (13 ft 11 in). The ship is powered by a diesel engine turning one screw. The ship has a maximum speed of 14.5 knots (26.9 km/h; 16.7 mph). (Note: Equasis has the gross tonnage as 2,556, while the Miramar Ship Index has the tonnage at 2,565. This may just be a typographical error.) The vessel has capacity for 131 passengers and 100 tons of cargo.

== Service history ==
The vessel was constructed by Port Weller Dockyards in St. Catharines, Ontario with the yard number 75. The ferry was launched on June 11, 1986 and completed in October later that year. Northern Ranger entered service in 1986 with Marine Atlantic. Northern Ranger is named after her predecessor, SS Northern Ranger, launched in Scotland in 1936 and operated by the Newfoundland Railway and later Canadian National Railways for thirty years.

In 1997, the Government of Newfoundland and Labrador took over all intra-provincial ferry service from the federal crown corporation in exchange for a one-time payment for highway construction and capital costs toward improving the ferry service. Northern Ranger was transferred from federal ownership under Transport Canada to that of the Department of Transportation and Works. The vessel was then operated by Nunatsiavut Marine Inc. (NMI).

The ferry offered weekly service from Happy Valley-Goose Bay to Rigolet, Makkovik, Postville, Hopedale, Natuashish and Nain with a return trip. On weekends, the vessel travels from Happy Valley-Goose Bay to Rigolet, Cartwright, Black Tickle and return.

As of January 1, 2019, Northern Ranger was taken out of service and decommissioned. The vessel was replaced by a new ferry, MV Kamutik W, that began sailing in early June 2019.

In early 2020 the ship was acquired by Mushuau Innu First Nation and it was planned to use the vessel to supplement Kamutik W. After a drydock and refit period the vessel entered service but made limited voyages in this role.

Ownership of the vessel was then transferred to Natuashish Shipping and was operated by Canship Innu Marine. A legal dispute between the companies led to a disruption of service by the ferry.

The vessel was sold to Fortuna Ltd to fulfil a concession agreement with Tristan da Cunha in 2025, serving as Fortuna's dedicated cargo and passenger vessel. It arrived under tow in Hull, UK for refit in June, 2026. It is currently being prepared for use on the Cape Town to Tristan da Cunha route as a supply and passenger vessel.
