= Randy Edmunds (politician) =

Canadian politician

Randy Edmunds MHA

Member of the Newfoundland and Labrador House of Assembly for Torngat Mountains
- In office October 27, 2011 – April 17, 2019
- Preceded by: Patty Pottle
- Succeeded by: Lela Evans

Personal details
- Party: Liberal
- Relations: Lela Evans (cousin); Anthony Andersen (uncle); Wally Andersen (uncle)

Randy Edmunds is a Canadian politician in Newfoundland and Labrador. He was elected to the Newfoundland and Labrador House of Assembly in the 2011 provincial election. A member of the Liberal Party of Newfoundland and Labrador, he represented the electoral district of Torngat Mountains until 2019.

== Personal life ==
Edmunds is the son of William "Bill" Edmunds (1932–1983), co-founder of the Labrador Inuit Association (predecessor to Nunatsiavut) and Ruth Flowers (1940–2015), an advocate for women's issues in Labrador. Edmunds is the owner and operator of the Adlavik Inn in Makkovik. He is married to Lori Dyson who unsuccessfully sought the Liberal nomination for Lake Melville and currently serves on the town council of Happy Valley-Goose Bay.

His uncle Wally Andersen is also a politician.

== Political career ==
Edmunds, who is of Inuit descent and was born in North West River, was first elected in 2011. His district is the largest of the provincial electoral districts covering roughly 28% of the province's area. However, this district contains only 6 communities, none of which are reachable by road and the total population is below 4,000 (as of 2011). The district includes the Inuit self-governing territory known as Nunatsiavut, as well as the Naskapi community of Natuashish.

Edmunds was re-elected in 2015 but with only around 700 votes. His district had the lowest turnout in the province (less than 40% of eligible voters voted).

Edmunds was defeated in the 2019 provincial election by his cousin Progressive Conservative candidate Lela Evans.

Edmunds opposed the Muskrat Falls hydro development.

== Electoral record ==
2019 Newfoundland and Labrador general election
| Party | Candidate | Votes | % | ±% |
|---|---|---|---|---|
| Progressive Conservative | Lela Evans | 623 | 56.64 | +53.90 |
| Liberal | Randy Edmunds | 477 | 43.36 | -48.46 |
| Total valid votes | | 1,100 | | |
| Total rejected ballots | | | | |
| Turnout | | | | |
| Eligible voters | | | | |
| Progressive Conservative gain from Liberal | | Swing | | +51.58 |

2015 Newfoundland and Labrador general election
| Party | Candidate | Votes | % | ±% |
|---|---|---|---|---|
| Liberal | Randy Edmunds | 779 | 92.6% | +43.5 |
| NDP | Mark Sharkey | 39 | 4.6% | -7.7 |
| Progressive Conservative | Sharon Vokey | 23 | 2.7% | -36.0 |

2011 Newfoundland and Labrador general election
| Party | Candidate | Votes | % | ±% |
|---|---|---|---|---|
| Liberal | Randy Edmunds | 744 | 49.08% | +6.72 |
| Progressive Conservative | Patty Pottle | 586 | 38.65% | -10.17 |
| NDP | Alex Saunders | 186 | 12.27% | – |
