= Mushuau Innu First Nation =

First Nation in Canada

Coordinates: 55°54′47″N 61°7′38″W

- Band No. 32
- People: Naskapi
- Headquarters: Natuashish
- Province: Newfoundland and Labrador

Land
- Land area: 44.26

Population (October 2019)
- On reserve: 991
- On other land: 1
- Off reserve: 80
- Total population: 1072

Government
- Chief: Patricia Andrew
- Council: Mary Lucy Dicker; Angela Pasteen; Simon Pokue; Mathias Rich

Website
- Innu.ca

Mushuau Innu First Nation is a First Nations band government located in the province of Newfoundland and Labrador, Canada. The band has one reserve which has been located near the community of Natuashish since 2002 when it moved from Davis Inlet. The reserve has an area of roughly 44 square kilometres (11,000 acres).

The Mushuau Innu and the Naskapi were once the same people, speaking the same dialect and writing in syllabics, but split off and headed to Eastern Labrador, probably for sustainability reasons. Very few (if any) Mushuau Innu are able to write in syllabics any more. The majority are Catholic and use the Montagnais Bible which does not use syllabics.

The chief of this First Nation is John Nui. As of October 2019, the Nation has a registered population of 1072 people, of whom 991 live on-reserve. The population of Natuashish at the 2021 Census performed by Statistics Canada was 856, down from 938 in 2016.

== History ==
The Naskapi traditionally lived in the interior of Labrador and Quebec. In 1830, the Hudson's Bay Company established a trading post at Fort Chimo, Rupert's Land and in 1831 they established one at Davis Inlet, Labrador. The HBC traded ammunition, tobacco and alcohol to the Naskapi in exchange for fur. It is likely that the substance abuse problems that exist among the Mushuau Innu started when the HBC arrived.

The traditional way of life of the Naskapi was threatened in 1916 when caribou herd were too small to sustain the Naskapi. The same year, a Naskapi settlement was recorded at "Old Davis Inlet" (located on mainland Labrador near the modern settlement). In 1942, the Commission of Government took control of the trading post at Davis Inlet. In 1945, a Catholic missionary (from Montreal according to the Innu) set up a church in the community. The missionary attempted to control alcohol abuse in the community around this time and allowed non-drinking Innu to have bigger punts. The 1945 census showed that a large Innu community existed at Davis Inlet and a few residents used the surname "Rich" however most residents did not use a surname. A small Innu population also existed in Nain.

In 1948, the Commission moved 74 Innu from Davis Inlet to Nutak (a now-resettled Inuit community) in the north. The Innu were not consulted about the move and after a year they returned on-foot to Davis Inlet. It is unclear why the resettlement took place at all. After the province joined Canada in 1949, the Indian Act was not applied to the Innu since (according to the commission) status Indians at the time did not have the right to vote while indigenous peoples of Labrador had the right to vote before confederation. The Innu were mostly unaware of the Act and the treaties with the First Nations in other provinces until the "white paper controversy" in 1969. Many Innu felt like the federal and provincial governments had ignored them. In 1967, "Old Davis Inlet" was abandoned and the Innu were moved to the modern settlement of Davis Inlet on Iluikoyak Island. The province hoped to improve the economic situation for the Innu by getting them more involved in the saltwater fishery while the province also provided ferry service to Davis Inlet connecting it to the rest of Labrador and to Newfoundland. The Innu were promised modern housing in the new settlement however the houses were poorly constructed and lacked running water during winter while other houses lacked running water at all. The tough land prevented the houses from having basements and prevented the community from having a sewage system. Suicide and substance abuse were commonplace among the Mushuau Innu.

In 1992, six unattended children were killed in a house fire and in 1993, a video of young children huffing gasoline and shouting that they wanted to die gained national attention.

In December 1993, the Mushuau Innu Band Council banished a provincial court judge and the Royal Canadian Mounted Police (RCMP) from the community. The public reasoning for the expulsion concerned Innu dissatisfaction with the practice and application of the Canadian Criminal Code to its people. The Innu also stated that the RCMP did not have jurisdiction over their community. The standoff continued until March 1995 when a Memorandum of Understanding was signed between the Government of Canada and the Mushuau Innu Band Council to establish Indigenous police officers to assist the RCMP.

On February 3, 1995, the Mushuau Innu served written eviction notice on Diamond Field Resources, the project developer of Voisey's Bay. On February 4, 1995, the Voisey's Bay standoff began and nearly 50 Mushuau Innu arrived at the Voisey's Bay Diamond Field Resources mining camp. By February 6, 1995, there were nearly 80 Innu at the site, they caused approximately $10,000 damage to Diamond Field Resources equipment. The RCMP had dispatched 30 officers to the site in an effort to maintain order. Order was eventually restored after Diamond Field Resources agreed to have the Innu fully engaged in the development planning process.

In November 1999, international Indigenous rights organization Survival International released a report on the Labrador Innu entitled Canada's Tibet: The Killing of the Innu. The report called the Innu of Davis Inlet "the most suicide-ridden people of the world".

The Innu hoped to relocate to the mainland so they could have better housing and hopefully fix some social issues however premier Brian Tobin hoped for them to move to an existing community like Nain while the Innu wanted a new community built. After Tobin left office in 2000 the province agreed to build a new community at Sango Pond called Natuashish. In the provincial election in 1999, the Progressive Conservative Party's candidate for the Torngat Mountains was Simeon Tshakapesh, the first Innu to ever contest in a province-wide election. He was defeated by incumbent MHA Wally Andersen.

The Davis Inlet crisis was profiled in the 1996 documentary film Utshimassits: Place of the Boss.

== Current situation ==
The Mushuau Innu gained recognition under the Indian Act in 2002 and Natuashish became a federal Indian reserve in 2003. The new community has better housing than the settlement at Davis Inlet and it is now easier for the Innu to reach their traditional hunting lands. The MV Kamutik W (a ferry service operated by Nunatsiavut Marine Inc.) goes on a route from Happy Valley-Goose Bay to Black Tickle, Cartwright, Rigolet, Makkovik, Hopedale, Natuashish and Nain every summer. Natuashish can also be reached via the Natuashish Airport.

In a 2005 CBC report the local band council was accused of corruption, specifically that the leadership was trafficking drugs and other illicit substances to maintain power.

The community's attempt to resolve its problem with alcoholism led to a ban on the sale, purchase, and possession of alcohol within the reserve. The bylaw was originally passed in 2008 by a margin of two votes. The prohibition bylaw was upheld in a subsequent referendum held in the community in March 2010.

In 2017, the Innu Nation stated that there are 165 Labrador Innu children in foster care, 80 of whom are placed outside their home communities of Natuashish and Sheshatshiu. As of 2020, according to Innu Nation Grand Chief Gregory Rich, Natuashish and Sheshatshiu have a collective population of about 3,000 with about half of that being youths. Of that 167 of them are in the care of the Manager of Child and Youth Services.

After years of having their finances under third-party and co-management, in 2019 the Mushuau Innu First Nation moved out of co-management for the first time in its history.

In May 2020, Wally Rich, a 15-year-old boy from Natuashish died by suicide while in provincial care residing at a group home in Happy Valley-Goose Bay. Innu Nation Grand Chief Gregory Rich believes it is the first time a child in the care of the Newfoundland and Labrador Department of Children, Seniors and Social Development has taken their own life.
