= Nunatsiavut =

Inuit-claimed autonomous area in Canada

- Autonomous area
- Flag Seal
- Anthem: Labradorimiut
- Nunatsiavut's location in Newfoundland and Labrador (centred on Nain)
- Coordinates: 56°32′11″N 61°43′08″W
- Country: Canada
- Province: Newfoundland and Labrador
- Created: June 23, 2005
- Capital: Hopedale (legislative); Nain (administrative)

Government
  - Type: Consensus government within the parliamentary system of Canada
  - Body: Nunatsiavut Assembly (Nunatsiavut katimajitsuangit)
  - President: Johannes Lampe (since 2016)
  - First Minister: David Dicker Jr. (since May 19, 2026)
  - MHA: Lela Evans (since 2019)
  - MP: Philip Earle (since 2025)

Area
  - Total: 66,787.13 km^{2} (25,786.66 sq mi)
  - Officially: 15,800 km^{2} (6,100 sq mi)

Population (2021)
  - Total: 2,323
  - Density: 0.035/km^{2} (0.091/sq mi)
- Time zone: UTC−04:00 (AST)
- Postal code prefix: A0P
- ISO 3166 code: NL
- Federal riding: Labrador (electoral district)
- Provincial riding: Torngat Mountains (electoral district)
- Website: nunatsiavut.com

Nunatsiavut (/nuːˈnɑːtsiəvʊt/; Inuktitut: ᓄᓇᑦᓯᐊᕗᑦ) is an autonomous area claimed by the Labradorimiut (Labrador Inuit) / Nunatsiavummiut in Newfoundland and Labrador, Canada. The settlement area includes territory in Labrador extending to the Quebec border. In 2002, the Labrador Inuit Association submitted a proposal for limited autonomy to the government of Newfoundland and Labrador. The constitution was ratified on December 1, 2005, at which time the Labrador Inuit Association ceased to exist, and the new Government of Nunatsiavut was established, initially being responsible for health, education and cultural affairs. It is also responsible for setting and conducting elections, the first of which was executed in October 2006. An election for the ordinary members of the Nunatsiavut Assembly was held on May 4, 2010. Its incumbent president is Johannes Lampe who assumed office in 2016.

In Inuttitut / Inuktitut, Nunatsiavut means "Our Beautiful Land". This name was ratified by the Labrador Inuit Constitution and passed by the Labrador Inuit Association in 2002. A primary objective of autonomy is for the preservation of the Inuit culture and language, as well as the environment through environmental stewardship.

Nunatsiavut is counted in the federal census as Division 11.

== Self-governance ==
The Labrador Inuit Association had filed a land claim for portions of Labradorian land in 1977. In 1988, the Labrador Inuit Association, the government of the province of Newfoundland, and the government of Canada began negotiations based on the land claim. An agreement in principle was achieved in 2001, and on May 26, 2004, the agreement was ratified by over 75% of eligible voters subject to the land claim.

On January 22, 2005, the Inuit of Nunatsiavut signed the Labrador Inuit Lands Claims Agreement with the federal and provincial governments covering 72,520 km^{2} (28,000 sq mi) of land, including the entire northern salient of Labrador north of Nain as well as a portion of the Atlantic coast south of there. The agreement also includes 44,030 km^{2} (17,000 sq mi) of sea rights. Although the Inuit will not own the whole area, they were granted special rights related to traditional land use, and they will own 15,800 km^{2} (6,100 sq mi) designated Labrador Inuit Lands. The agreement also establishes the Torngat Mountains National Park in the northern area of the land claim.

The Labrador Inuit Lands Claims Agreement is a treaty between the Inuit of Labrador, the provincial government of Newfoundland and Labrador, and the federal government of Canada, that is constitutionally protected under the aboriginal and treaty rights of Indigenous peoples in Canada granted by section 35 of the Constitution Act, 1982.

The self-governance agreement included a transfer of $130 million from the federal government in compensation for the forced relocation of the Inuit in the 1950s; $120 million to establish self-government; royalty payments from the provincial government for resource extraction; and land, mineral, and marine rights. Unspecified benefits for Inuit in Labrador not within the settlement area were also part of the agreement.

The agreement was ratified by the Labrador Inuit, the General Assembly of Newfoundland and Labrador, and the Parliament of Canada, where it received Royal Assent on June 23, 2005.

On December 1, 2005, the constitution was formally adopted, and a swearing-in ceremony was held for the first cabinet, an interim government which consisted of members of the Labrador Inuit Association board of directors. This day marked the official transfer of power from the provincial government to the newly formed Government of Nunatsiavut "to make their own laws relating to cultural affairs, education and health".

In October 2006, Nunatsiavut held its first election to form a nine-member government, which was sworn in on October 16 in Hopedale.

In 2019, there were 150 Inuit children in the care of the Department of Children, Seniors, and Social Development. An independent review, A Long Wait for Change, was completed by the province's Child and Youth Advocate at the request of the Nunatsiavut government and released in 2019. It contained 33 recommendations, including providing the support needed to transition to an Inuit-led child welfare system in Nunatsiavut.

On June 18, 2021, Nunatsiavut stated that it had begun the process of seeking devolution of child protection services from the Department of Children, Seniors, and Social Development with the goal for negotiations to conclude within three years.

=== Nunatsiavut Assembly and Executive Council ===
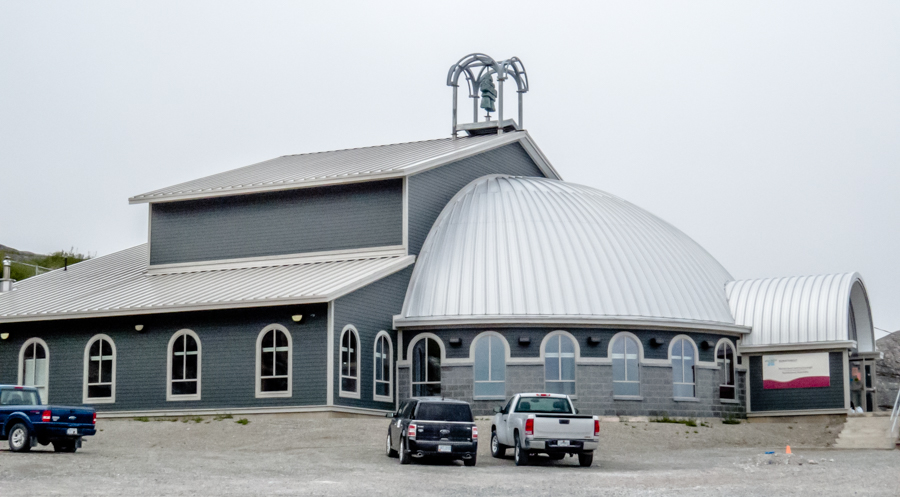
Nunatsiavut Assembly Building

The land claim agreement provided for the establishment of the Government of Nunatsiavut to represent the residents of the land claim area and any Labrador Inuit living elsewhere in Canada. Nunatsiavut remained a part of Newfoundland and Labrador, but the Government of Nunatsiavut acquired the jurisdictional authority over health, education, and justice in the land claim area. Nunatsiavut operates under a consensus government within the parliamentary system of Canada.

The legislature of the government is based in Hopedale, and its administrative centre is in Nain. It is subject to the Nunatsiavut Elections Act. The Nunatsiavut Assembly consists of a minimum of 16 members, including:

- a president, who chairs the Nunatsiavut Executive Council,
- ten ordinary members (one each from Hopedale, Makkovik, Postville and Rigolet; two each from Nain, the Happy Valley-Goose Bay, Northwest River and Mud Lake area, and all Inuit elsewhere in Canada)
- the Angajukĸâk (mayor) of each of the five Inuit Community Governments (one each in Nain, Hopedale, Postville, Makkovik and Rigolet)
- the Chairs of the Inuit Community Corporations.

There are currently two Inuit Community Corporations, NunaKatiget Inuit Community Corporation and Sivunivut Inuit Community Corporation, and 18 members in the Assembly.

From the Assembly, a member will be elected to act as First Minister. The Assembly would act as a forum for discussion of laws, and it will oversee the Executive Council.

The Nunatsiavut Executive Council will be appointed by the First Minister. It will implement laws, develop and implement policy, initiate and prepare legislation, oversee the administration of the government, and be accountable to the Assembly.

Inuit Community Governments were established in Nain, Hopedale, Makkovik, Postville and Rigolet. Each consists of a municipal council, elected from and by both Inuit and non-Inuit residents, and is led by an Angajukĸâk, a chief executive officer and mayor, who must be Inuk.

Large settlements of Labrador Inuit outside the settlement area will be represented by Inuit Community Corporations.

The Angajukĸâk of each Inuit Community Government and the chairperson of each Inuit Community Corporation will represent his or her community in the Nunatsiavut Assembly.

== Departments ==
There are seven departments headed by six ministers with Nunatsiavut Secretariat headed by the President of the Executive Council.

- Department of Finance, Human Resources and Information Technology
- Department of Education and Economic Development
- Department of Culture, Recreation and Tourism
- Department of Health & Social Development
- Department of Lands and Natural Resources
- Department of Nunatsiavut Affairs
- Nunatsiavut Secretariat

== Wildlife, Plants, and Commercial Fisheries Co-management Board ==
Chapters 12 and 13 of the Labrador Inuit Land Claim Agreement created the Torngat Wildlife and Plants Co-management Board, and the Torngat Joint Fisheries Board.

== Government buildings ==
While each community has government facilities, there are two key sites:

Nunatsiavut Government Head Office is located at 25 Ikajuktauvik Road in Nain and houses the administrative functions of the Government of Nunatsiavut.

The Nunatsiavut Assembly sits at Nunatsiavut Assembly Building in Hopedale. The building opened in 2012, faces Hopedale Harbour and is the first permanent home since 2008 (previous assemblies met at various locations in Hopedale).

== Geography ==
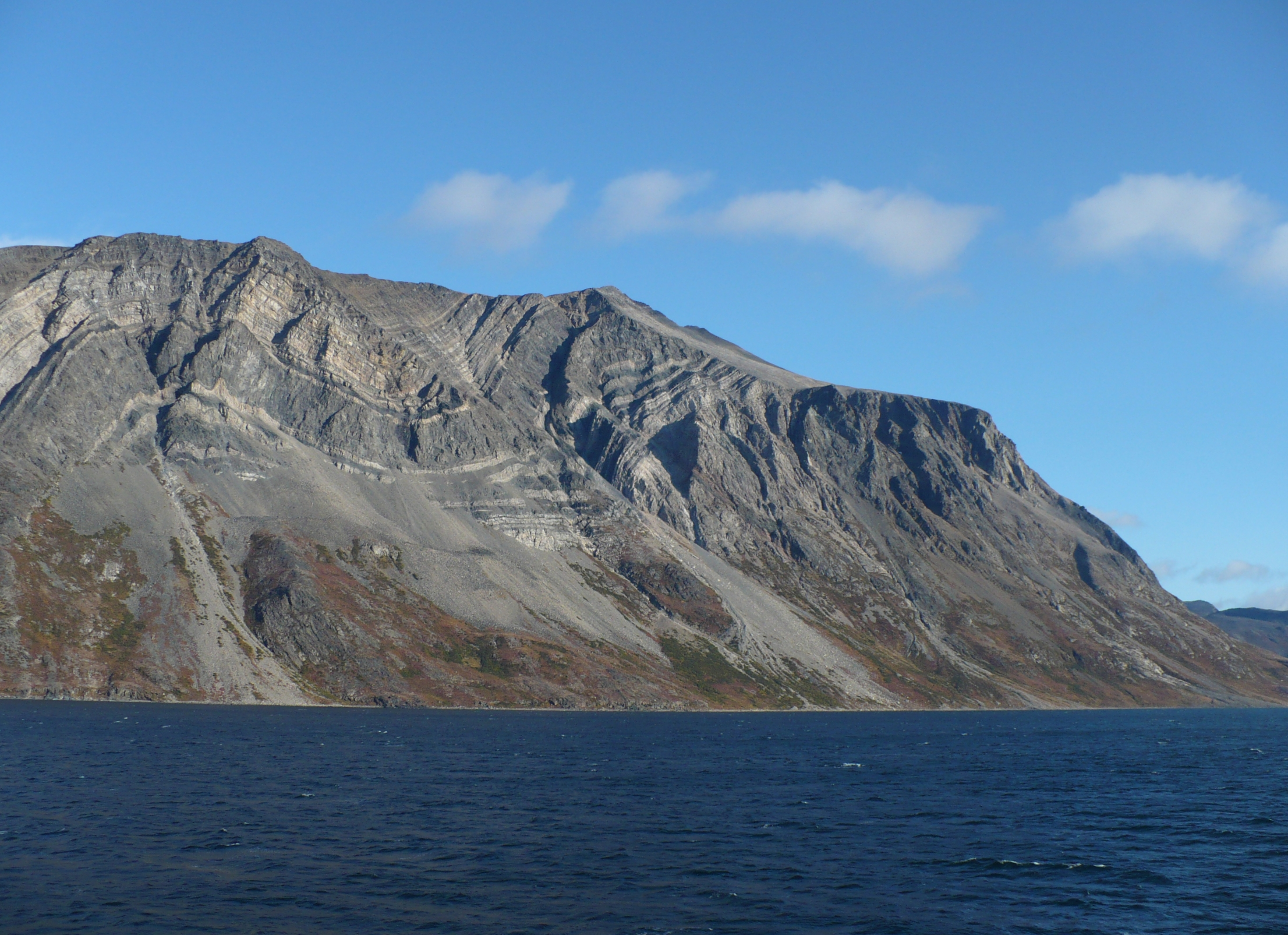
Saglek Fjord, Torngat Mountains National Park

Nunatsiavut's land claim includes the area surrounding Hamilton Inlet and the coastline north to a point south of Davis Inlet; the Mulligan River also forms part of the boundary. It also claims the land north of the Notakwanon River and as far north as Cape Chidley. Nunatsiavut is the southernmost recognized Inuit territory in Canada.

Nunatsiavut's territory consists of two geographic regions. The southern portion contains Rigolet, Makkovik, Postville and Hopedale and has a population of 1,433 (as of 2016). The northern portion contains Nain as well as the Torngat Mountains National Park. Nunatsiavut is located near the Innu communities of Natuashish and Sheshatshiu as well as North West River, Happy Valley-Goose Bay and Cartwright. It is also near the Quebec settlements of Kuujjuaq and Kangiqsualujjuaq.

=== Towns ===
Towns of Nunatsiavut
- Hopedale
- Makkovik
- Nain
- Postville
- Rigolet

=== Land disputes ===
The Labrador Métis Nation (LMN), unsuccessfully filed a challenge to Nunatsiavut's claim in the Supreme Court of Newfoundland and Labrador. The LMN's original land claim included all of Labrador south of Nain.

Makivik had their claim to the coast between Killiniq Island and Voisey's Bay accepted in 1993; it later asked the federal government not to ratify Nunatsiavut's claims since it overlapped with their claim.

Nunatsiavut has consistently opposed recognizing NunatuKavut as an Inuit collective having treaty rights under Section 35 of the Constitution Act, 1982 and has consistently opposed their land claim.

== Census Division No. 11 ==
Division No. 11
- Census division
- Interactive map of Division No. 11
- Coordinates: 55°04′39″N 59°11′15″W
- Country: Canada
- Province: Newfoundland and Labrador

Area (2021)
  - Total: 66,787.13 km^{2} (25,786.66 sq mi)

Population (2021)
  - Total: 2,323
  - Density: 0.03478/km^{2} (0.09009/sq mi)

In the 2021 Canadian census conducted by Statistics Canada, Division No. 11 had a population of 2,323 living in 780 of its 845 total private dwellings, a change of -9.2 from its 2016 population of 2,558. With a land area of 66,787.13 km^{2} (25,786.66 sq mi), it had a population density of 0.03/km^{2} (0.09/sq mi) in 2021.

=== Unorganized subdivisions ===
- Subdivision C
- Subdivision E

== Demographics ==
=== Languages ===
==== Knowledge of official languages ====
Knowledge of official languages
Census	Total	English		French		French & English		Other	
Year	Responses	Count	Pop %	Count	Pop %	Count	Pop %	Count	Pop %
2021	2,320	2,305	99.35%	0	0.00%	15	0.65%	0	0.00%
2016	2,560	2,525	98.63%	0	0.00%	20	0.78%	10	0.39%
2011	2,610	2,585	99.04%	0	0.00%	15	0.57%	10	0.38%

==== Mother tongue ====
Mother tongue	Number	Percentage
English	2,080	89.7
Inuktitut	175	7.5
Innu (Montagnais)	10	0.4
French	5	0.2
Tagalog (Pilipino, Filipino)	5	0.2
English and French	5	0.2

=== Religion ===
According to the 2016 census, 2,150 people or 92.9% of Nunatsiavut's residents identify as Christian. A total of 300 (13.0%) identified as Anglican while 1,555 (67.2)% identified as "Other Christian and Christian-related traditions" (most likely Moravian).

Religion in Canada		Number	Percentage
Christians	Canadian Christianity	2,150	92.9
Christians	Other Christian and Christian-related traditions	1,555	67.2
Christians	Anglican	300	13.0
Christians	Pentecostal and other Charismatic	155	6.7
Christians	Catholic	70	3.0
Christians	United Church	45	1.9
Christians	Methodist and Wesleyan (Holiness)	15	0.6
Christians	Christianity (not included elsewhere)	10	0.4
Other	Irreligion	160	6.9
Other	Traditional (North American Indigenous) spirituality	10	0.4

=== Ethnic origin ===
According to the 2021 census, 2,170 or 93.7% of Nunatsiavut's residents are of Indigenous ancestry. Of the 2,170 Indigenous Canadians, a total of 2,095 (90.5%) were Inuit, 35 (1.5%) were First Nations, and 30 (1.3%) Métis.

Nunatsiavut grants enrolment to what it defines as two different ethnicities, Inuit and the Kablunângajuit (mixed Inuit-European).

Top ten ethnic origins (2021 Census)
Ethnic origin	Number	Percentage
Inuit	2,095	90.5%
Indigenous North American (not otherwise specified)	135	5.8%
English	125	5.4%
Irish	50	2.2%
Canadian	45	1.9%
Scottish	40	1.7%
Caucasian (White) (not otherwise specified)	35	1.5%
Norwegian	30	1.3%
Innu (Montagnais) (not otherwise specified)	30	1.3%
Métis	25	1.1%

==== Kablunângajuit ====
According to the Nunatsiavut government, somebody who is a Kablunângajuk (plural: Kablunângajuit) is "an individual who is given that designation according to Inuit customs and traditions". The Nunatsiavut government applies this designation to somebody who is either of mixed Inuit and non-Inuit descent or is not of Inuit descent but settled in what is now Nunatsiavut before 1940. Their ancestors were mainly fur traders from places such as Quebec, Scotland, Norway and elsewhere who often married Inuit.

The term Kablunângajuk means "person who resembles a white person". They were historically called terms such as "settlers" or "half-breeds".

The Kablunângajuit are usually counted as Inuit by Statistics Canada so their exact population is unknown. As Nunatsiavut beneficiaries, they have all the same privileges as Inuit beneficiaries in the region.

=== Employment ===
In the 2021 census, the employment rate was 44.2%, up from the 2016 census figure of 40.9%, and the unemployment rate was 19.3%, down from 29.9%, during the same period Voisey's Bay Mine is a nickel mine located about 35 km (22 mi) southwest of Nain.

== Transportation ==
The MV Northern Ranger provided ferry service between Nunatsiavut's five communities as well as Natuashish, Happy Valley-Goose Bay, Cartwright and Black Tickle. In 2019 the ferry was replaced by MV Kamutik W. All five settlements also have airports with flights formerly provided by Air Labrador and now served by Air Borealis. No community in Nunatsiavut is road accessible; however, there have been some proposals to connect Nunatsiavut to the Trans-Labrador Highway.

== Notable people ==
- Caubvick, namesake of Mount Caubvick
- Randy Edmunds, Member of the House of Assembly for Torngat Mountains (2011–19)
- Johannes Lampe, 3rd President of Nunatsiavut (2016–present)
- Sarah Leo, 2nd President of Nunatsiavut (2012–16)
- Mikak, one of the first Inuit to travel to, and return from, Europe in the mid-1700s.
- Natan Obed, President of the Inuit Tapiriit Kanatami
- Keith Russell, Member of the House of Assembly for Lake Melville (2011–15, 2025-present), former provincial cabinet minister
- John Shiwak, soldier
- Abraham Ulrikab, former Hebron resident
- Marlene Winters-Wheeler, speaker of the assembly

== See also ==
- List of proposed provinces and territories of Canada
