= Sheshatshiu =

Sheshatshiu Tshishe-shatshu
- Indian reserve
- Sheshatshiu Indian Reserve No. 3
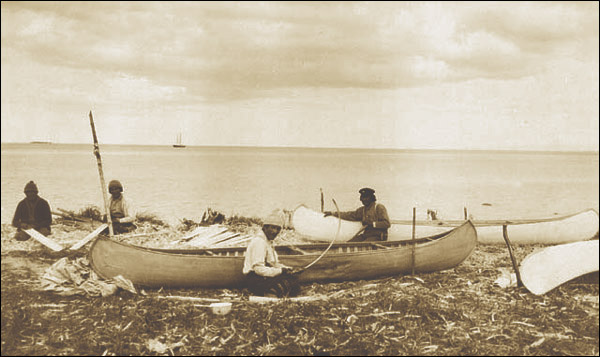
- Innu near Sheshatshiu in the 1920s.

- Location in Labrador.
- Coordinates: 53°30′46″N 60°8′8″W
- Country: Canada
- Province: Newfoundland and Labrador
- Settled: 1960s (as a permanent settlement), 19th Century (as a trading post)
- Recognition under the Indian Act: 2002

Government
  - Chief: Eugene Hart
  - Federal MP: Philip Earle (LIB)
  - Provincial MHA: Keith Russell (IND)

Population (2021)
  - Total: 1,225
- Time zone: UTC-4 (AST)
- Area code: 709
- Highways: Route 520 (North West River Road)
- Website: http://sheshatshiu.ca/

Sheshatshiu (Innu pronunciation: [ʃehatʃju]) is an Innu federal reserve and designated place in the Canadian province of Newfoundland and Labrador. The reserve is approximately 40 kilometres (25 mi) north of Happy Valley-Goose Bay. Some references may spell the community's name as Sheshatshit, the t spelling is more traditional in the Innu-aimun language, but the u is used more commonly in English to avoid inappropriate connotations. The name means "a narrow place in the river".

The community is inhabited by the Sheshatshiu Innu First Nation, whose current chief is Eugene Hart.

== History ==
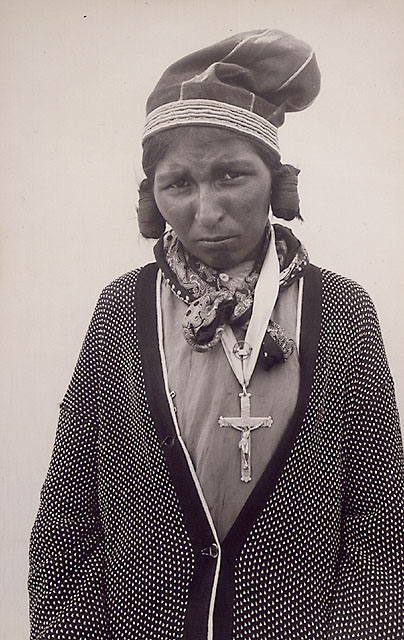
Woman from Sheshatshiu, 1930s.

In 1836 the Hudson's Bay Company established a trading post at North West River and the traders provided the Innu with European tools.

During the First World War, some Innu from Sheshatshiu fought overseas in the Royal Newfoundland Regiment. In 1915 the International Grenfell Association established a hospital in North West River to serve the European settlers and indigenous people of the region. This hospital was closed in 1983 and residents of Sheshatshiu and North West River now rely on Happy Valley-Goose Bay for medical services.

In 1946 elections were held to send delegates to the Newfoundland National Convention. This was the first time an election was held in Labrador. Lester Burry was elected to the convention and he supported future premier Joey Smallwood and his proposal of confederation with Canada.

In 1949 when Newfoundland and Labrador joined Canada the Indian Act did not include the First Nations of the province. This was done to preserve their right to vote however it also prevented the Innu from protecting their land and culture.

The Innu of Labrador settled into permanent villages in the 1960s and were one of the last Aboriginal groups in Canada to do so. Previously, Sheshatshiu had only been used by the Innu as a coastal settlement and for trading with Europeans.

In the 1980s and 1990s the community of Sheshatshiu, along with the Innu Nation, protested against NATO low-level tactical training flights which utilized CFB Goose Bay.

In 1997, Queen Elizabeth II visited Sheshatshiu and was presented with a letter by community leaders lamenting colonialization.

In November 2000, the community, along with Davis Inlet, took the unprecedented step of asking the Canadian federal government to step in and assist with a local addiction crisis. Due to a variety of factors, including economic adversity, alcoholism and gas sniffing were both rampant in the community, in some cases affecting children as young as five years old.

Labrador's Innu became status Indians under the Indian Act in 2002 and "Sheshatshiu 3" became a federal reserve in 2006.

In 2017, the Innu Nation stated that there are 165 Labrador Innu children in foster care, 80 of whom are placed outside their home communities of Sheshatshiu and Natuashish.

In October 2019, the Sheshatshiu Innu First Nation declared a suicide crisis after 10 suicide attempts were reported within the community in a matter of days.

As of 2020, according to Innu Nation Grand Chief Gregory Rich, Sheshatshiu and Natuashish have a collective population of about 3,000 with about half of that being youths. Of that 167 of them are in the care of the Manager of Child and Youth Services.

== Geography ==
Sheshatshiu is in Labrador within Division No. 10. It is adjacent to Inuit community of North West River. Sheshatshiu is connected to Happy Valley-Goose Bay by a 40 km paved road. The roads in Sheshatshiu and North West River are the most northern paved roads in Atlantic Canada. It is located roughly at the province's geographic centre.

== Demographics ==
In the 2021 Census of Population conducted by Statistics Canada, the Sheshatshiu 3 reserve recorded a population of 1,225 residing in 340 of its 373 total private dwellings, a change of −18.3% from its 2016 population of 1,500. With a land area of 8.48 km^{2} (3.27 sq mi), it had a population density of 144.5/km^{2} (374.1/sq mi) in 2021. The median age is 27. 99.2% of Sheshatshiu's residents are Indigenous. The community has minorities of Europeans. The largest religion in the community is Catholicism. Most of Sheshatshiu's residents speak a dialect of the Cree language. English is commonly spoken in Sheshatshiu as well.

As a designated place in the 2016 Census of Population, Sheshatshiu recorded a population of 671 living in 160 of its 177 total private dwellings, a change of −48.9% from its 2011 population of 1314. With a land area of 1.88 km^{2} (0.73 sq mi), it had a population density of 356.9/km^{2} (924.4/sq mi) in 2016.

== Notable people ==
- David Penashue, rock singer.
- Peter Penashue, former cabinet minister under Stephen Harper from 2011-13.

== See also ==
- List of communities in Newfoundland and Labrador
- List of designated places in Newfoundland and Labrador
- List of Indian reserves in Canada
- Mushuau Innu First Nation
