= Torngat Mountains (electoral district) =

Provincial electoral district in Newfoundland and Labrador, Canada

Newfoundland and Labrador electoral district
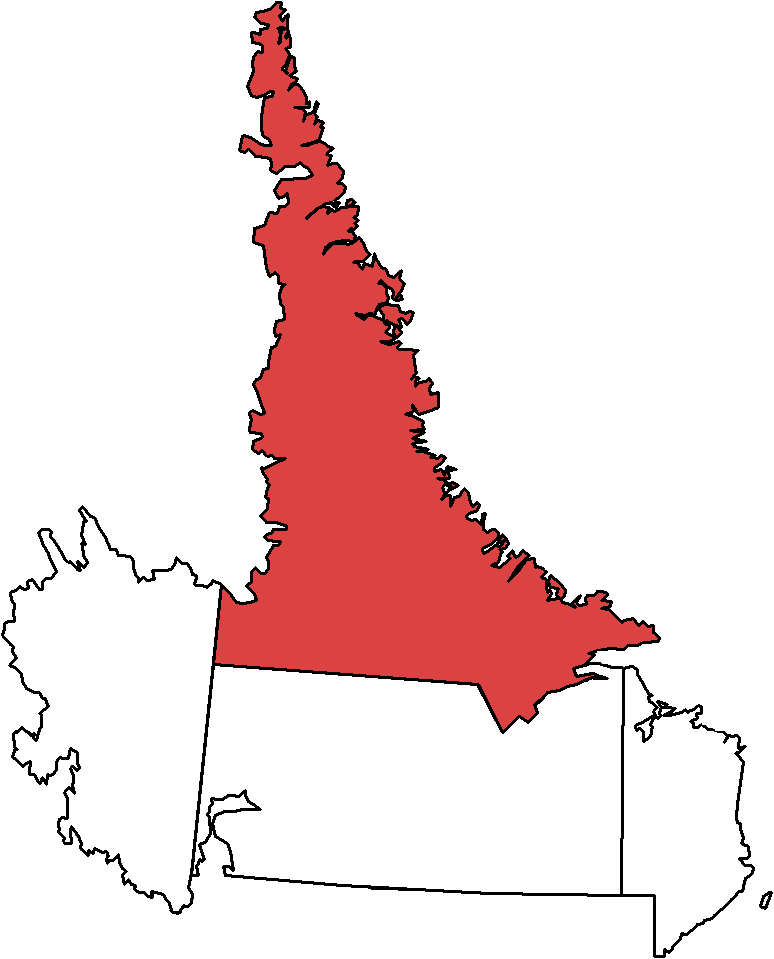
- Torngat Mountains in relation to other districts in Labrador

Provincial electoral district
- Legislature: Newfoundland and Labrador House of Assembly
MHA
Lela Evans
Progressive Conservative
- District created: 1979
- First contested: 1979
- Last contested: 2025

Demographics
- Population (2011): 3,548
- Electors (2015): 2,132
- Area (km²): 113,100
- Census division(s): Division No. 10 (part), Division No. 11
- Census subdivision(s): Hopedale, Makkovik, Nain, Natuashish, Postville, Rigolet, Division No. 10, Subd. C (part), Division No. 10, Subd. D (part), Division No. 10, Subd. E, Division No. 11, Subd. C (part), Division No. 11, Subd. E

Torngat Mountains is a provincial electoral district for the House of Assembly of Newfoundland and Labrador, Canada. In 2011 there were 2,130 eligible voters living within the district. The district takes its name from the Torngat Mountains.

Progressive Conservative Lela Evans was elected as the Member of the House of Assembly (MHA) for this district in the 2019 general election defeating Liberal incumbent Randy Edmunds. Evans was re-elected in 2021. On October 25, 2021, Evans left the PC Party to sit as an independent in the House of Assembly. On March 7, 2022, Evans joined the NDP. On July 16, 2024, she rejoined the PC Party.

The district contains a large indigenous population, including the Inuit self-governing territory of Nunatsiavut, as well as the Naskapi community of Natuashish which is a federal reserve. The Voisey's Bay nickel mine, near Nain, is also in the district.

All six indigenous communities in the district are inaccessible by road and may be reached only by air or sea.

== Members of the House of Assembly ==
The district has elected the following members of the House of Assembly:

Assembly	Years	Member	Party
38th	1979–1982	Garfield Warren	Liberal
39th	1982–1985	Garfield Warren	Liberal
39th	1985	Garfield Warren	Progressive Conservative
40th	1985–1989	Garfield Warren	Progressive Conservative
41st	1989–1993	Garfield Warren	Progressive Conservative
42nd	1993–1996	William Andersen III	Liberal
43rd	1996–1999	Wally Andersen	Liberal
44th	1999–2003	Wally Andersen	Liberal
45th	2003–2007	Wally Andersen	Liberal
46th	2007–2011	Patty Pottle	Progressive Conservative
47th	2011–2015	Randy Edmunds	Liberal
48th	2015–2019	Randy Edmunds	Liberal
49th	2019–2021	Lela Evans	Progressive Conservative
50th	2021	Lela Evans	Progressive Conservative
50th	2021–2022	Lela Evans	Independent
50th	2022–2024	Lela Evans	New Democrat
50th	2024–2025	Lela Evans	Progressive Conservative
51st	2025–present	Lela Evans	Progressive Conservative

== Election results ==
Graph of election results (minor parties that never got 2% of the vote or did not run consistently are omitted) View source data.

2025 Newfoundland and Labrador general election
Party	Candidate	Votes	%	±%
Progressive Conservative	Lela Evans	859	95.66	+6.86
Liberal	Tony Powell	29	3.23	-0.15
New Democratic	MK Morris	10	1.11	-6.71
Total valid votes		898		
Total rejected ballots				
Turnout				
Eligible voters				
Progressive Conservative hold		Swing		+3.51

2021 Newfoundland and Labrador general election
Party	Candidate	Votes	%	±%
Progressive Conservative	Lela Evans	420	88.79	+32.21
New Democratic	Patricia Johnson-Castle	37	7.82	
Liberal	Devon Ryan	16	3.38	-40.03
Total valid votes		473	98.75	
Total rejected ballots		6	1.25	
Turnout		479	22.46	
Eligible voters		2,133		
Progressive Conservative hold		Swing		+12.19
Source(s) "Officially Nominated Candidates General Election 2021" (PDF). Elections Newfoundland and Labrador. "NL Election 2021 (Unofficial Results)".

2019 Newfoundland and Labrador general election
Party	Candidate	Votes	%	±%
Progressive Conservative	Lela Evans	623	56.58	+53.85
Liberal	Randy Edmunds	478	43.42	-49.21
Total valid votes		1,100	98.57	
Total rejected ballots		16	1.43	+0.26
Turnout		1,117	55.24	+15.33
Eligible voters		2,022		
Progressive Conservative gain from Liberal		Swing		+51.53

2015 Newfoundland and Labrador general election
Party	Candidate	Votes	%	±%
Liberal	Randy Edmunds	779	92.63	+43.55
New Democratic	Mark Sharkey	39	4.64	-7.63
Progressive Conservative	Sharon Vokey	23	2.73	-35.91
Total valid votes		841	98.82	–
Total rejected ballots		10	1.18	–
Turnout		851	39.92	-34.92
Eligible voters		2,132		
Liberal hold		Swing		+25.59
Source: Elections Newfoundland and Labrador

2011 Newfoundland and Labrador general election
Party	Candidate	Votes	%	±%
Liberal	Randy Edmunds	744	49.08	+7.88
Progressive Conservative	Patty Pottle	586	38.65	-15.51
New Democratic	Alex Saunders	186	12.27	+12.27
Total valid votes		1,516	97.43	–
Total rejected ballots		40	2.57	–
Turnout		1,556	74.84	+3.65
Eligible voters		2,079		
Liberal gain from Progressive Conservative		Swing		+11.70
Source: Elections Newfoundland and Labrador

2007 Newfoundland and Labrador general election
Party	Candidate	Votes	%	±%
Progressive Conservative	Patty Pottle	794	54.16	+28.18
Liberal	Danny Dumaresque	604	41.20	-27.73
Labrador	Jimmy Tuttauk	68	4.64	-0.45
Total valid votes		1,466	99.05	–
Total rejected ballots		14	0.95	–
Turnout		1,480	71.19	+3.60
Eligible voters		2,079		
Progressive Conservative gain from Liberal		Swing		+27.95
Source: Elections Newfoundland and Labrador

2003 Newfoundland and Labrador general election
Party	Candidate	Votes	%	±%
Liberal	Wally Andersen	934	68.93	-16.13
Progressive Conservative	Winston White	352	25.98	+11.04
Labrador	Lucy Jararuse	69	5.09	+5.09
Total valid votes		1,355	99.05	–
Total rejected ballots		13	0.95	–
Turnout		1,368	67.59	-12.66
Eligible voters		2,024		
Liberal hold		Swing		-13.59
Source: Elections Newfoundland and Labrador

1999 Newfoundland and Labrador general election
Party	Candidate	Votes	%	±%
Liberal	Wally Andersen	1,036	85.06	+14.77
Progressive Conservative	Simeon Tshakapesh	182	14.94	-14.77
Total valid votes		1,218	99.59	–
Total rejected ballots		5	0.41	–
Turnout		1,223	80.25	-4.38
Eligible voters		1,524		
Liberal hold		Swing		+14.77
Source: Elections Newfoundland and Labrador

1996 Newfoundland and Labrador general election
Party	Candidate	Votes	%	±%
Liberal	Wally Andersen	795	70.29	+21.49
Progressive Conservative	Bill Flowers	336	29.71	-18.85
Total valid votes		1,131	99.42	–
Total rejected ballots		3	0.58	–
Turnout		1,134	84.63	+1.66
Eligible voters		1,340		
Liberal hold		Swing		+20.17
Source: Elections Newfoundland and Labrador

1993 Newfoundland and Labrador general election
Party	Candidate	Votes	%	±%
Liberal	William Andersen III	591	48.80	+17.15
Progressive Conservative	Patricia Ford	588	48.56	-14.21
New Democratic	Felix Barnable	32	2.64	-2.94
Total valid votes		1,211	99.43	–
Total rejected ballots		7	0.57	–
Turnout		1,218	82.97	-7.43
Eligible voters		1,468		
Liberal gain from Progressive Conservative		Swing		+15.68
Source: Elections Newfoundland and Labrador

1989 Newfoundland and Labrador general election
Party	Candidate	Votes	%	±%
Progressive Conservative	Garfield Warren	821	62.77	+10.97
Liberal	Mervin Linstead	414	31.65	-9.07
New Democratic	Bill Wheaton	73	5.58	-1.90
Total valid votes		1,308	98.57	–
Total rejected ballots		19	1.43	–
Turnout		1,327	90.40	+8.71
Eligible voters		1,468		
Progressive Conservative hold		Swing		+10.02
Source: Elections Newfoundland and Labrador

1985 Newfoundland and Labrador general election
Party	Candidate	Votes	%	±%
Progressive Conservative	Garfield Warren	589	51.80	+33.01
Liberal	Melvin Woodward	463	40.72	-40.49
New Democratic	John Terriak	85	7.48	+7.48
Total valid votes		1,137	98.78	–
Total rejected ballots		14	1.22	–
Turnout		1,151	81.69	-17.37
Eligible voters		1,409		
Progressive Conservative gain from Liberal		Swing		+36.75
Source: Elections Newfoundland and Labrador

1982 Newfoundland and Labrador general election
Party	Candidate	Votes	%	±%
Liberal	Garfield Warren	925	81.21	+26.96
Progressive Conservative	David L. Hunt	214	18.79	-26.96
Total valid votes		1,139	98.70	–
Total rejected ballots		15	1.30	–
Turnout		1,154	99.06	+25.07
Eligible voters		1,165		
Liberal hold		Swing		+26.96
Source: Elections Newfoundland and Labrador

1979 Newfoundland and Labrador general election
Party	Candidate	Votes	%	±%
Liberal	Garfield Warren	460	54.25	–
Progressive Conservative	William Harold Flowers	388	45.75	–
Total valid votes		848	98.38	–
Total rejected ballots		14	1.62	–
Turnout		862	73.99	–
Eligible voters		1,165		
Liberal notional gain from Progressive Conservative		Swing		–
Source: Elections Newfoundland and Labrador

== See also ==
- List of Newfoundland and Labrador provincial electoral districts
- Canadian provincial electoral districts
