= Postville, Newfoundland and Labrador =

Postville
- Town
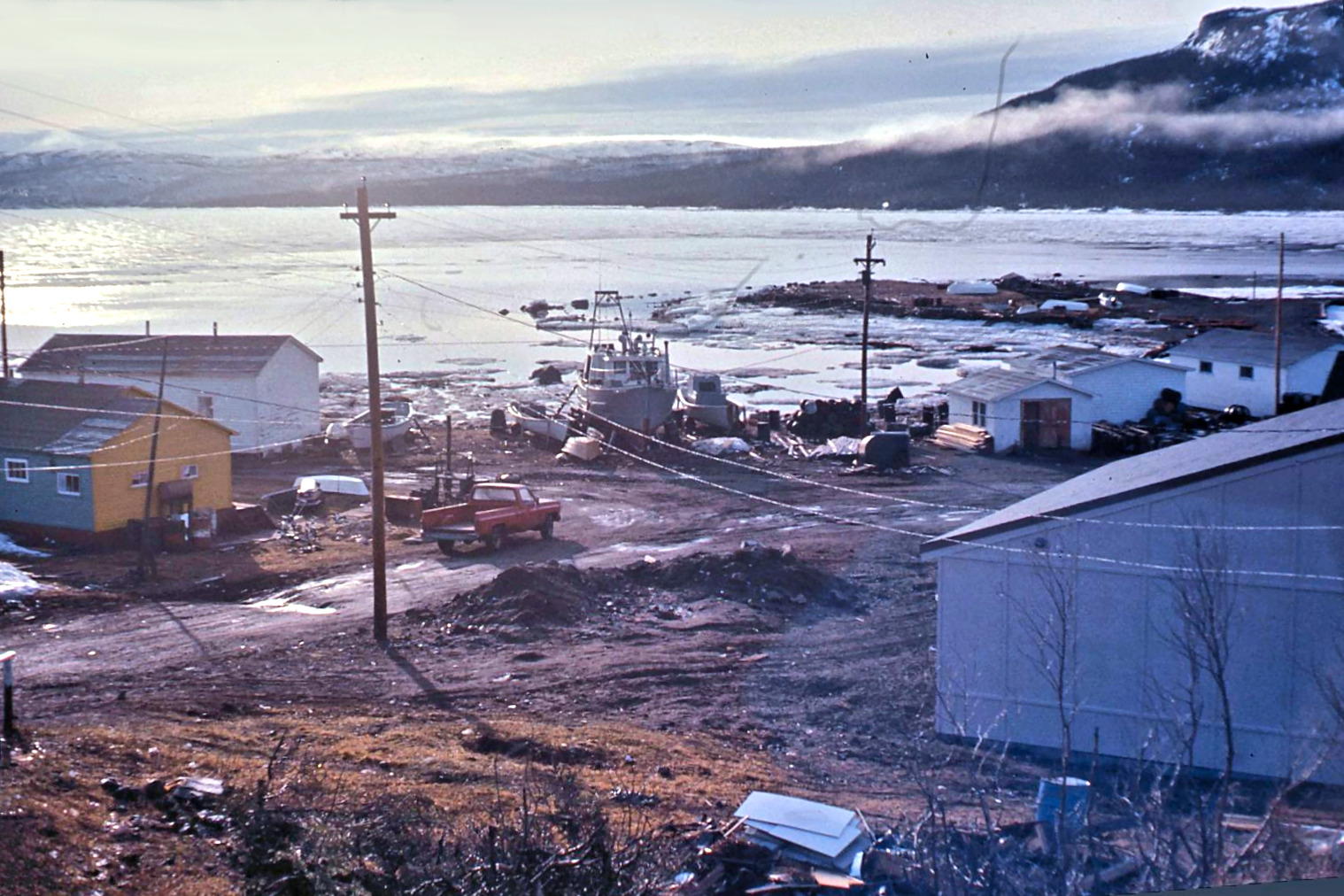
- Postville, early June 1977
- Nickname: The Post
- Location of Postville
- Coordinates: 54°54′30″N 59°46′21″W
- Country: Canada
- Province: Newfoundland and Labrador
- Region: Nunatsiavut

Government
  - Mayor (AngajukKâk): Melanie gear
  - Federal MP: Philip Earle (L)
  - Provincial MHA: Lela Evans (PC)
  - Nunatsiavut Assembly member: George Gear

Area
  - Total: 2.39 km^{2} (0.92 sq mi)
- Elevation: 68 m (223 ft)

Population (2021)
  - Total: 188
  - Density: 78.7/km^{2} (204/sq mi)
- Time zone: UTC−04:00 (AST)
  - Summer (DST): UTC−03:00 (ADT)
- Postal codes: A0P 1N0
- Area code: 709

Postville is an Inuit town in the north of Labrador, Canada. It had a population of 188 as of 2021. It is located about 40 km (25 mi) inside Kaipokok Bay, 180 km (110 mi) NNE of Happy Valley-Goose Bay. Postville Airport is nearby.

Postville is inaccessible by road and may be reached only by air (via Postville Airport) or via snowmobile in the winter or via ferry service that operates between Nain and Happy Valley-Goose Bay during the ice-free period from June to November.

Uranium deposits are located near Postville.

== History ==
In the 18th century, the Franco-Canadian merchant Louis Fornel landed near the present site of Rigolet and claimed the land for France in 1743. The Franco-Canadians established trading posts in Kaipokok Bay at that time.

The British took control of New France in 1763 after the Seven Years' War, bringing a flood of European fishermen and whalers to settle on the Labrador coast.

Around 1784, Pierre Marcoux and Louis Marchand reopened the old Kaipokok trading post. In 1795, the Moravian Brothers of Hopedale observed that Pierre Marcoux and the former partner of George Cartwright Collingham were the first Europeans to settle in Kaipokok Bay.

In order to compete with the Moravians, the Hudson's Bay Company established a coastal trading post on Kaipokok Bay in 1837 shortly after Rigolet. It operated until 1880.

The village was first known as The Post because of the Hudson's Bay Company trading post located in the area. Inuit families traded in the fall, winter and spring before returning to the coastal camps in the summer. The village was renamed Postville in the 1940s by Pentecostal pastor William Gillet who helped establish the community by building a school and a church. Through the 1940s it was mostly a winter residence for settlers who were scattered around the bay and coast in the summer. In 1949, Gillet opened a store in Postville and built a sawmill in Shanty Brook across the bay (which burnt down in 1957). From then, the population gradually began to concentrate in Postville. In 1961, its population was 84. Permanent settlement was further boosted by the opening of a shipyard in 1974. Although the shipyard closed a few years later, a new sawmill opened in 1990.

An uncommon magnitude 4.3 earthquake was measured in Labrador on February 5, 2020, with its epicentre about 18 kilometres (11 mi) east of Postville. It was the strongest quake on the Labrador coast in 40 years.

== Demographics ==
In the 2021 Census of Population conducted by Statistics Canada, Postville had a population of 188 living in 75 of its 83 total private dwellings, a change of 6.2% from its 2016 population of 177. With a land area of 2.39 km^{2} (0.92 sq mi), it had a population density of 78.7/km^{2} (203.7/sq mi) in 2021.

Historical census populations – Postville, Newfoundland and Labrador

Year	Pop.	±%
1976	164	—
1981	223	+36.0%
1986	220	−1.3%
1991	231	+5.0%
1996	223	−3.5%

Year	Pop.	±%
2001	215	−3.6%
2006	219	+1.9%
2011	206	−5.9%
2016	177	−14.1%
2021	188	+6.2%

Source: Statistics Canada
