= Patty Pottle =

Canadian politician

The Honourable Patty Pottle ECNL

Minister of Aboriginal Affairs of Newfoundland and Labrador
- In office October 30, 2007 – October 28, 2011
- Preceded by: Tom Rideout
- Succeeded by: Nick McGrath

Member of the Newfoundland and Labrador House of Assembly for Torngat Mountains
- In office November 1, 2007 – September 19, 2011
- Preceded by: Wally Andersen
- Succeeded by: Randy Edmunds

Personal details
- Party: Progressive Conservative Party
- Occupation: Businesswoman, educator

Patty Pottle is a Canadian politician in Newfoundland and Labrador. She represented the district of Torngat Mountains in the Newfoundland and Labrador House of Assembly from 2007 to 2011. She was a member of the Progressive Conservative Party and served as Minister of Aboriginal Affairs in the provincial government. She was defeated in the 2011 provincial election.

Pottle is a businesswoman and former educator who owns DJ's Gift Shop and Amaguk Inn, located in Hopedale; along with Big Land Grocery in Hopedale and Makkovik.

== Election results ==
2011 Newfoundland and Labrador general election
Party	Candidate	Votes	%	±%
Liberal	Randy Edmunds	744	49.08%	
Progressive Conservative	Patty Pottle	586	38.65%	–
NDP	Alex Saunders	186	12.27%	

2007 Newfoundland and Labrador general election
Party	Candidate	Votes	%	±%
Progressive Conservative	Patty Pottle	680	48.82%	–
Liberal	Danny Dumaresque	604	43.36%	
Labrador Party	Jimmy Tuttauk	109	7.82%	
