= Wally Andersen =

Canadian politician (born 1951)

The Honourable Wally Andersen ECNL

Member of the Nunatsiavut Assembly for Upper Lake Melville
- Incumbent
- Assumed office 2022 Serving with Gerald Asivak
- Preceded by: Marlene Winters-Wheeler

Minister of Labrador and Aboriginal Affairs
- In office February 17, 2003 – November 5, 2003
- Preceded by: Ernie McLean
- Succeeded by: Office Abolished

Member of the Newfoundland and Labrador House of Assembly for Torngat Mountains
- In office 1996–2007
- Preceded by: William Andersen III
- Succeeded by: Patty Pottle

Personal details
- Born: July 31, 1951 (age 75) Makkovik, Newfoundland and Labrador
- Party: Liberal
- Spouse: Marie

Wally Andersen (born July 31, 1951) is a former Liberal Member of the House of Assembly in the Canadian province of Newfoundland and Labrador. He was first elected in 1996 in the riding Torngat Mountains and was re-elected twice.

The son of Edgar Andersen and Muriel Lucy, he was born in Makkovik, Labrador and was educated in North West River. In 1975, he married Marie Delaney. Andersen was manager for the government stores in Labrador from 1974 to 1996. He was a member of the council for Happy Valley-Goose Bay. Andersen served 12 years as president of the local hockey association.

The Royal Newfoundland Constabulary charged Wally Anderson on July 23, 2007, with fraud, uttering a forged document and breach of trust in connection with the multimillion-dollar legislative spending scandal. He officially resigned from the legislature on September 5 of that year, leaving the Torngat Mountains riding vacant until the 2007 provincial election was called shortly thereafter. Among his successors as the MHA for Torngat Mountains include his nephew Randy Edmunds and niece Lela Evans.

Andersen was released in December 2009 after serving three months of a 15-month sentence.

In 2016, he won a by-election for the Happy Valley-Goose Bay town council defeating 3 other candidates. He was re-elected in the 2017 municipal elections, and became Deputy Mayor. Following the death of Mayor John Hickey in December 2017, Andersen became acting Mayor of the town and was later named Mayor in early 2018. Andersen announced in August 2021 that he would not be seeking re-election.

Andersen was elected to the Nunatsiavut Assembly in May 2022. He represents Upper Lake Melville (Happy Valley-Goose Bay, Mud Lake and North West River) and serves alongside his brother Anthony Andersen (representing Nain) and nephew Thomas Evans (representing Makkovik). Andersen defeated incumbent member Marlene Winters-Wheeler for the 2-member district (the other winner was Gerald Asivak).
