= North West River =

North West River Northwest River
- Town
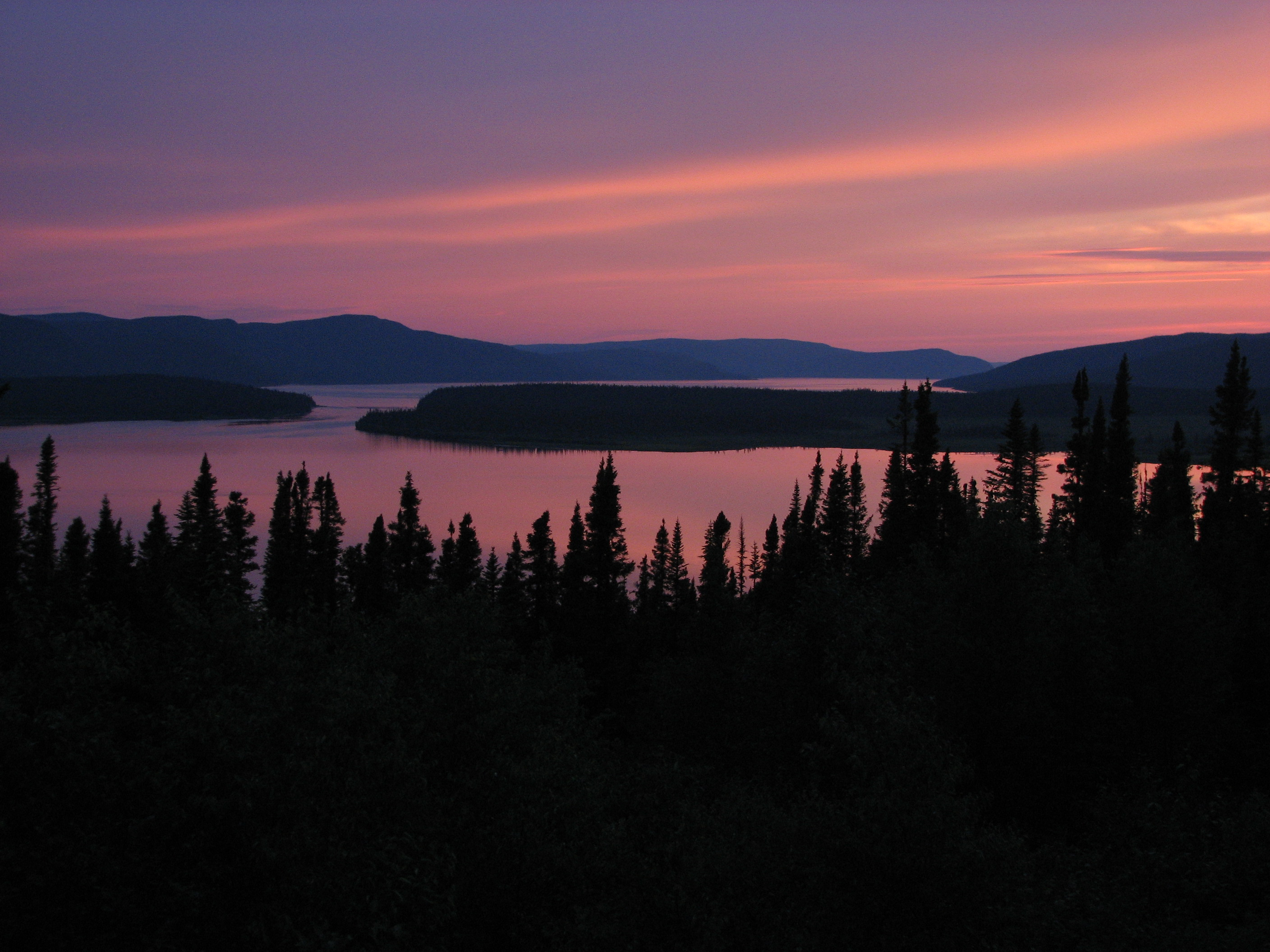
- View from Sunday Hill of sunset over Little Lake.

- Location of North West River North West River (Canada)
- Coordinates: 53°31′31.32″N 060°08′41.80″W
- Country: Canada
- Province: Newfoundland and Labrador
- Census division: 10
- Region: NunatuKavut (unofficial)
- Settled: 1743

Government
  - Mayor: Jeffrey Montague
  - MHA: Keith Russell
  - MP: Philip Earle
  - Nunatsiavut Assembly members: Gerald Asivak; Wally Andersen

Area
  - Total: 5 km^{2} (1.9 sq mi)

Population (2021)
  - Total: 560
- Time zone: UTC−04:00 (AST)
  - Summer (DST): UTC−03:00 (ADT)
- Postal code span: A0P 1M0
- Area code: 709
- Highways: Route 520 (North West River Road)
- Website: www.townofnwr.ca/home/

North West River is a small town located in central Labrador. Established in 1743 as a trading post by French Fur Trader Louis Fornel, the community later went on to become a hub for the Hudson's Bay Company and home to a hospital and school serving the needs of coastal Labrador. North West River is the oldest modern settlement in Labrador.

== Names ==
Fornel's trading post was known as Fort Esquimaux Baie (French for "Eskimo Bay Fort"). It was succeeded in 1757 by Fort Montagnais Point. The Hudson's Bay Company established Fort Smith, whose surrounding settlement became known as Lake Melville Post and then North West River Post.

== History ==
=== Prehistory ===
Central Labrador has been inhabited by Indigenous societies, such as Innu and the Maritime Archaic people, for over 7,000 years due to its bountiful wildlife.

=== Trapping ===
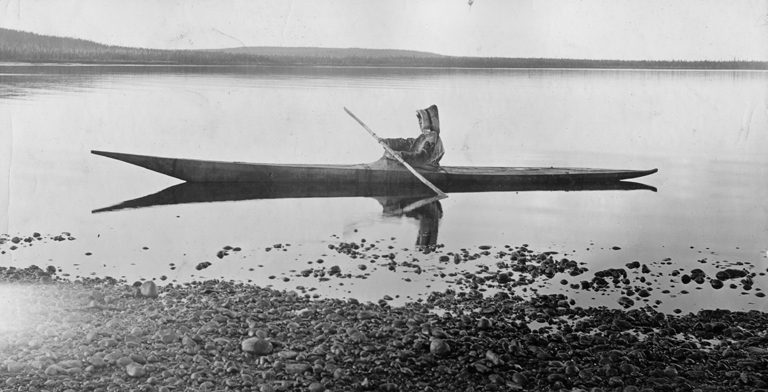
Kayaking near North West River in 1909.

In 1743 French fur trader Louis Fornel was the first European to establish a year-long settlement at the present site of North West River. The site was primarily used to trade furs with the local indigenous peoples for European goods. French settlers from Quebec moved to the area surrounding North West River to work as voyageurs and coureurs des bois (i.e., trappers). Many took on Inuit wives creating a population of Métis trappers and traders. Traders would also do business trading goods with the nomadic Naskapi Innu.

European fur traders relied on the knowledge of the land possessed by the trappers and the Innu to provide them with furs. Trappers living in and around North West River would come to the trading post to exchange furs, such as beaver, mink, marten, seal, fox, and bear, for flour, raisins, canvas tents, axes, guns and other goods. Trappers maintained traplines inherited from relatives throughout central Labrador.

=== Hudson's Bay Company ===
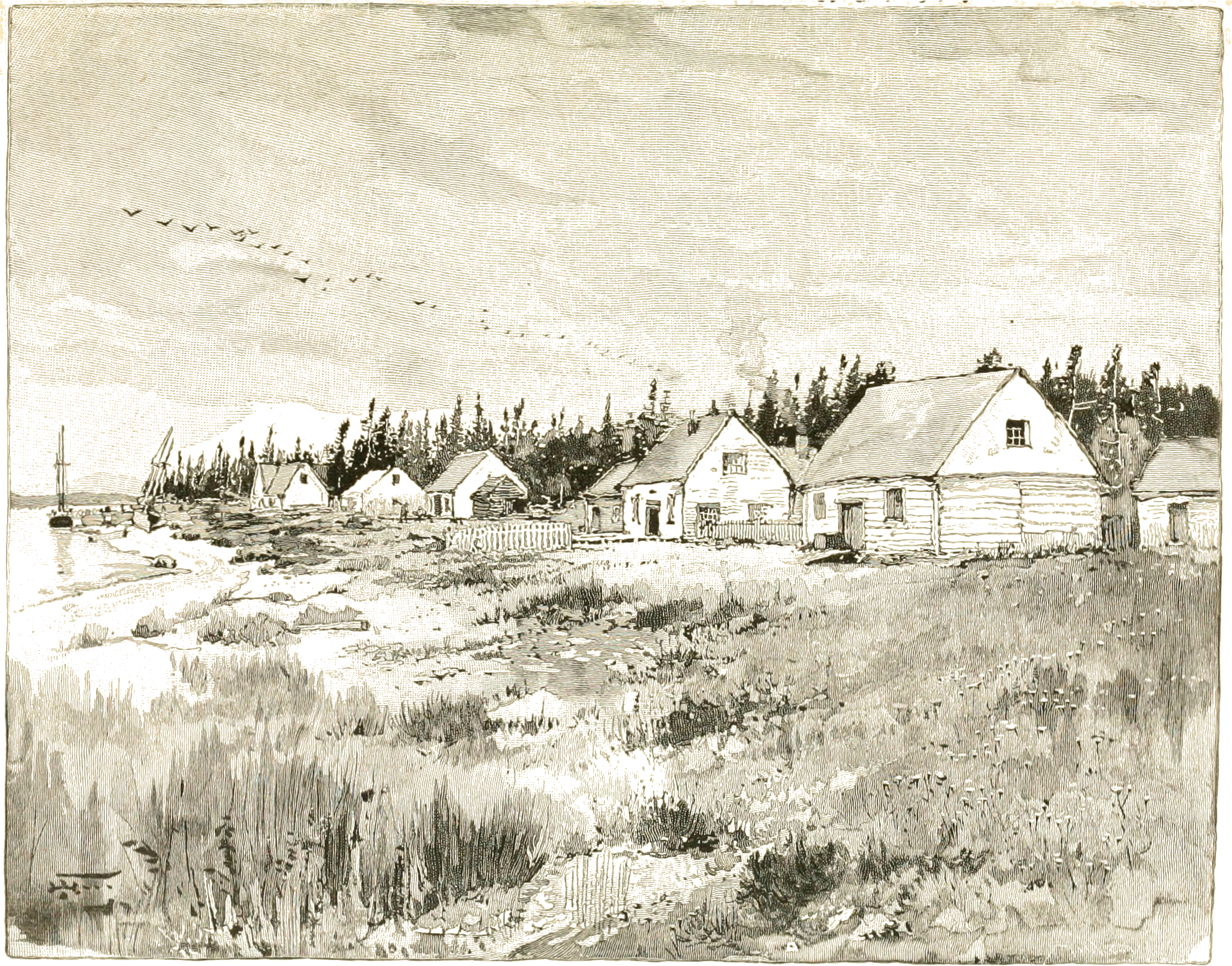
An engraving of the HBC post at North West River c. 1890

With the signing of the Treaty of Paris (1763) Labrador was passed from the French to the British. With the arrival of the British came the Hudson's Bay Company in 1836 who would enjoy a trade monopoly over central Labrador's furs for more than 100 years. The newest of the Hudson's Bay trading posts was constructed in 1923 and still remains as museum run and maintained by the Labrador Heritage Society.

=== Grenfell Mission ===
In 1892 British doctor Wilfred Grenfell began travelling the Labrador coast providing medical services to fishermen and the Aboriginals living in Labrador, establishing the Grenfell Mission. In 1914 the International Grenfell Association was formed. The mission took doctors and nurses from the United Kingdom, and a handful of Commonwealth countries, to serve the people of Newfoundland and Labrador. One of these doctors was Dr. Harry L. Paddon, who in 1915 established a hospital in North West River which would eventually serve the entire coast of Labrador.

In 1981 the International Grenfell Association dissolved, leaving all properties to the Grenfell Regional Health Services Board, a locally run board, no longer relying on the support of missionaries. The hospital in North West River was closed by the provincial government in 1983.

=== Expeditions ===
On July 15, 1903, Leonidas Hubbard with his two companions departed North West River for his tragic canoe expedition, described in Dillon Wallace's book, Lure of the Labrador Wild.

On June 27, 1905, Mina Benson Hubbard departed North West River to complete her husband's failed mission of 1903, and provided the first detailed map of northern Labrador's interior region.

In August, 1905, North West River was the camp site for a solar eclipse expedition sent by the government of the Dominion of Canada and including members of the British Astronomical Association, whose report states that "the resident population of the place consisted only of the Hudson Bay factor [...] and the two factors in charge of a French fur trading station on the opposite bank of the river, some two or three half-breed trappers, and a small company of Montagnais Indians, temporarily encamped at the station".

In July, 1928, Gino Watkins used North West River as the base for an expedition in which he and Jamie Scott explored the area on foot, by canoe and with dog sledge. They were initially accompanied by Lionel Leslie. In nine months the pair travelled about 800 miles by canoe and 1500 miles by dog sledge.

=== Cable car ===
Until 1961, access to North West River was restricted to small boats. The North West River Cable Car was completed in 1960 and first used in 1961 as a way to connect the people of North West River to neighboring Sheshatshiu and to the road leading to Happy Valley-Goose Bay. The Cable Car remained in operation until a permanent bridge was constructed in 1981. The cable car may still be seen on permanent display near the river.

== Present day ==
The fur trade collapsed after the Second World War. Many trappers abandoned their traplines to work at the new air force base at nearby Goose Bay.

Although North West River has remained small in size over the last 250 years, it remains a lively place full of history. The town offers scenic walking trails along the waterfront, through the forest or to the top of "Sunday Hill" where hikers can see a panoramic view of Lake Melville, the Mealy Mountains, Grand Lake and Little Lake. A modern bridge connects North West River to the rest of the continent which was constructed in 1980. Before that a cable car spanned the river for 19 years. Before that the river was only passable by boat.

In 2017, the town became the focus of a reality TV show, Discovery Channel Canada's Last Stop Garage featuring 'CRB', the only garage in town, and last garage on the highway before it ends.

=== Indigenous peoples ===
The interests of the Inuit in North West River are represented in Nunatsiavut by the Sivunivut Inuit Community Corporation. The board members of Sivunivut are elected by residents of North West River and the chairperson (currently Jeffrey Montague) serves in the Nunatsiavut Assembly. The Innu population of North West River is overseen by the Sheshatshiu Innu First Nation which controls the Sheshatshiu reserve adjacent to North West River. The combined population of the reserve and North West River was 1,867 in 2011.

== Demographics ==
In the 2021 Census of Population conducted by Statistics Canada, North West River had a population of 560 living in 247 of its 284 total private dwellings, a change of 2.4% from its 2016 population of 547. With a land area of 3.55 km^{2} (1.37 sq mi), it had a population density of 157.7/km^{2} (408.6/sq mi) in 2021.

Canada 2016 Census		Population	% of Total Population
Visible minority group Source:	South Asian	0	0.0
Visible minority group Source:	Chinese	0	0.0
Visible minority group Source:	Black	0	0.0
Visible minority group Source:	Filipino	0	0 .0
Visible minority group Source:	Latin American	0	0.0
Visible minority group Source:	Southeast Asian	0	0.0
Visible minority group Source:	Other visible minority	0	0.0
Total visible minority population		0	0.0
Aboriginal group Source:	First Nations	70	12.8
Aboriginal group Source:	Métis	15	2.7
Aboriginal group Source:	Inuit	220	40.3
Total Aboriginal population		265	48.6
White		280	51.4
Total population		545	100.0

== Economy ==
North West River is home to a bed and breakfast, a motel, one convenience store, a gas station and garage, a barber shop, a hair salon as well as a craft shop selling local handmade crafts. Guided tours are offered by local outfitters.

== Arts and culture ==
Held on the North West River Beach the last weekend of July, the North West River Beach Festival is in its 36th year. The two-day event is Labrador's largest music festival. Locals, travellers and ex-pats gather at the festival to socialize and watch local performers play traditional Labrador music. There are also crafts, foods and games.

In 2007, the Beach Festival was moved to the North West River Waterfront instead of its traditional location on the beach.

== Attractions ==
The Labrador Heritage Foundation operates a museum in the restored Hudson's Bay trading post. Various artifacts relating to the fur trade and Labrador history are cataloged and on display. The museum keeps regular hours in the Summer and can offer tours if booked ahead of time in the Winter.

The Labrador Interpretation Centre, located on Sunday Hill Road, is designed to provide a comprehensive view into the history and culture of Labrador. The centre features an art gallery, temporary exhibit space and a small theatre.

== Geography ==
North West River experiences generally mild summers with cold winters. Winter usually begins in mid November and lasts until mid April and summer begins in June and ends in early September. The temperature generally ranges from about −30 °C (−22 °F) at its coldest in the winters to about 30 °C (86 °F) in the summers.

The town is located on a hill dividing Little Lake from the larger Lake Melville. A small band of water (North West River) connects the two. The area of North West River is located on a sandy plain surrounded by mountains. The sand and gravel forming this plain was deposited by glaciers during the Last Glacial Period.
