= William Andersen III =

Canadian politician

William H. Andersen III (born 1948) is a former politician in Labrador, Canada. He represented Torngat Mountains in the Newfoundland House of Assembly from 1993 to 1996.

The son of Andrew Andersen and Christiana Lampe, he was born in Okkak Bay, Labrador. Andersen married Jan Woodford. He was a wildlife officer from 1979 to 1984. Andersen served as mayor of Nain from 1978 to 1984. He was president of the Labrador Inuit Association from 1984 to 1993.

He was elected to the provincial assembly in 1993, winning by only three votes after a judicial recount. Andersen did not run for reelection in 1996. In December 2005, he was named transitional president for the Nunatsiavut government in Labrador. Andersen took a leave of absence in November 2007 following allegations of sexual assault. He was found guilty but was given a conditional discharge in 2010.
