= Makkovik =

Makkovik Maggovik
- Town
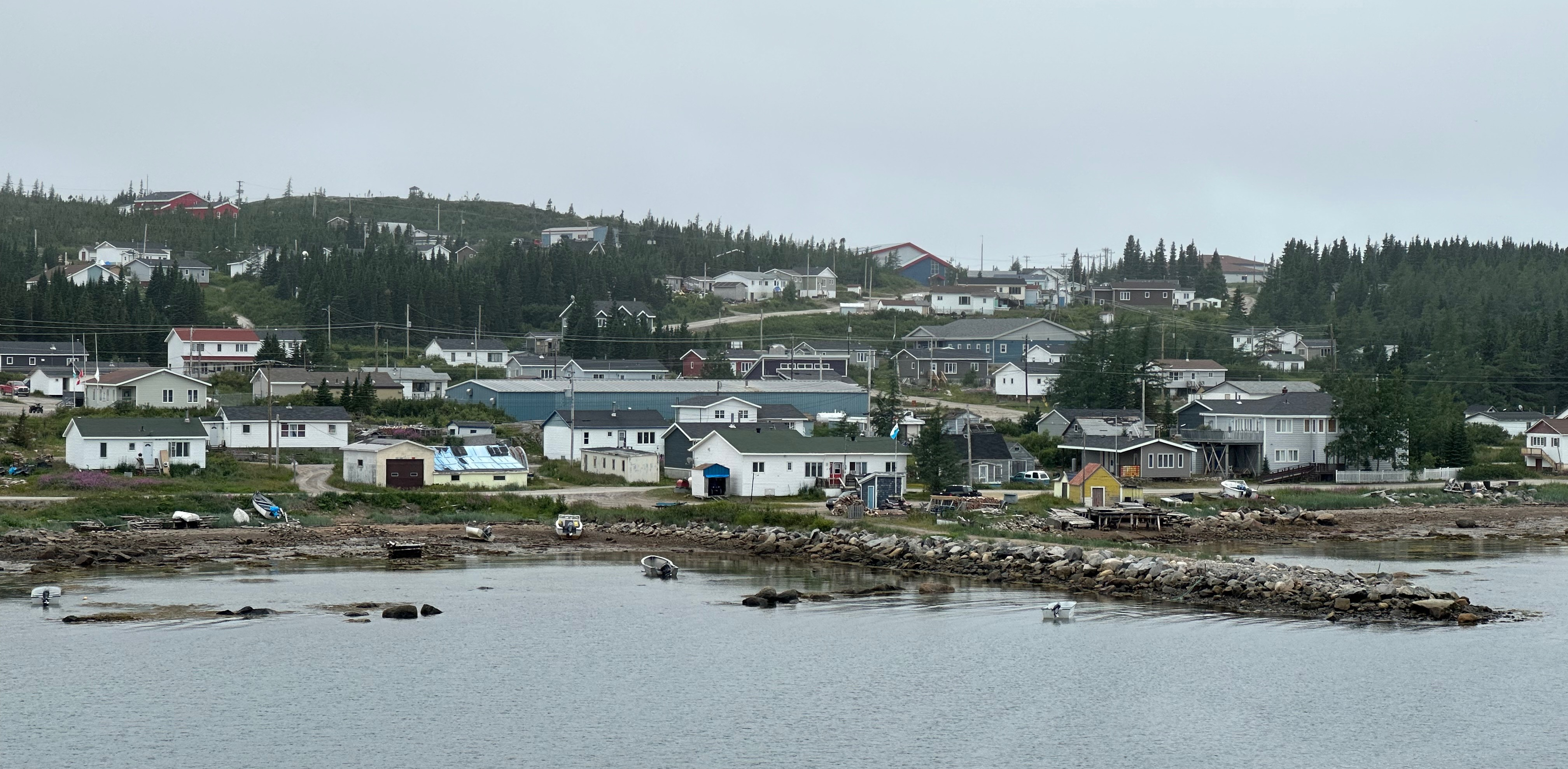
- View of Makkovik in 2023

- Location of Makkovik in Labrador Makkovik (Canada)
- Coordinates: 55°02′51″N 59°12′10″W
- Country: Canada
- Province: Newfoundland and Labrador
- Region: Nunatsiavut
- Settled: 1860
- Incorporated: March 26, 1970

Government
  - Mayor (AngajukKâk): Barry Andersen
  - Federal MP: Philip Earle (L)
  - Provincial MHA: Lela Evans (PC)
  - Nunatsiavut Assembly member: Thomas Evans

Area
  - Land: 2.95 km^{2} (1.14 sq mi)

Population (2021)
  - Total: 365
  - Density: 123.5/km^{2} (320/sq mi)
- Time zone: UTC−04:00 (AST)
  - Summer (DST): UTC−03:00 (ADT)
- Canadian Postal code: A0P 1J0
- Area code: 709

Makkovik (/ˈmʌkoʊvɪk/ muh-KOH-vik; Inuit: Maggovik) is a town in Labrador in eastern Canada. It had 365 residents in 2021. The main industry is snow crabbing and there is a fishing cooperative.

Makkovik is only accessible by air or sea.

== History ==
The Makkovik area has been inhabited by the Inuit since 1400 or earlier.

Some early European settlers included Antoine Perrault and Jean-Baptiste Jacques, French Canadian fur traders who set up trading posts at nearby Kaipokok Bay. Another early settler to the area was Charles McNeill, a fisherman from Galston, Scotland, who married Wealtheness Metcalfe of Clarke's Beach, Newfoundland, and established a fishing post at Island Harbour. A Scottish fur trader named George Lyall settled near Island Harbour in the 1850s while a Welsh settler named Thomas Evans settled at Ben's Cove. Several Inuit families also continued to live in the region. Near the 1880s, some families of mixed European and Inuit origin from Cartwright and other areas of southern Labrador also established fishing posts near Makkovik. The later establishment of the Moravian mission in Makkovik eventually pushed many families to move from outlying posts (such as Island Harbour, Ben's Cove, Adlavik, Ailik and Tishialuk) to Makkovik itself or to Postville.

Torsten Kverna Andersen and his wife Mary Ann Thomas set up a trading post at Makkovik in 1860. Andersen was originally from Norway and had previously worked in Rigolet while his wife was from Labrador.

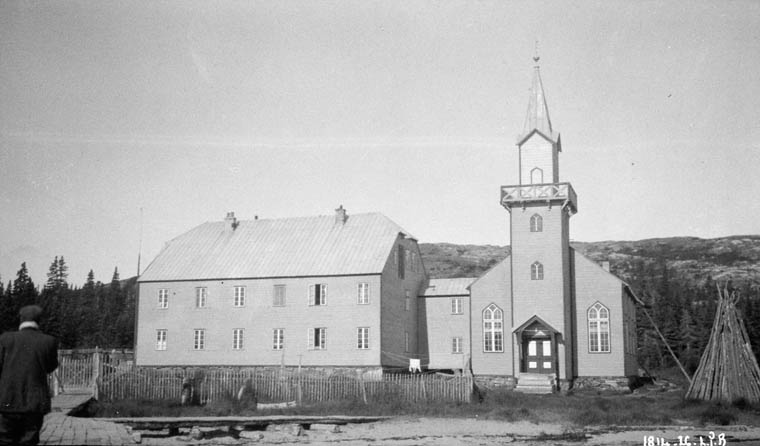
The Moravian Church and Mission School in 1926.

Colonization was assured in 1896 when the Moravian Church established a mission station and residential school there. Both the mission and school were destroyed by a fire in 1948 but the economy was instilled in the 1950s by two notable events. First was the forceful resettlement to Makkovik of 150 Inuit residents of the northern communities of Nutak and Hebron. Second was the establishment nearby of a radar warning station by the United States government.

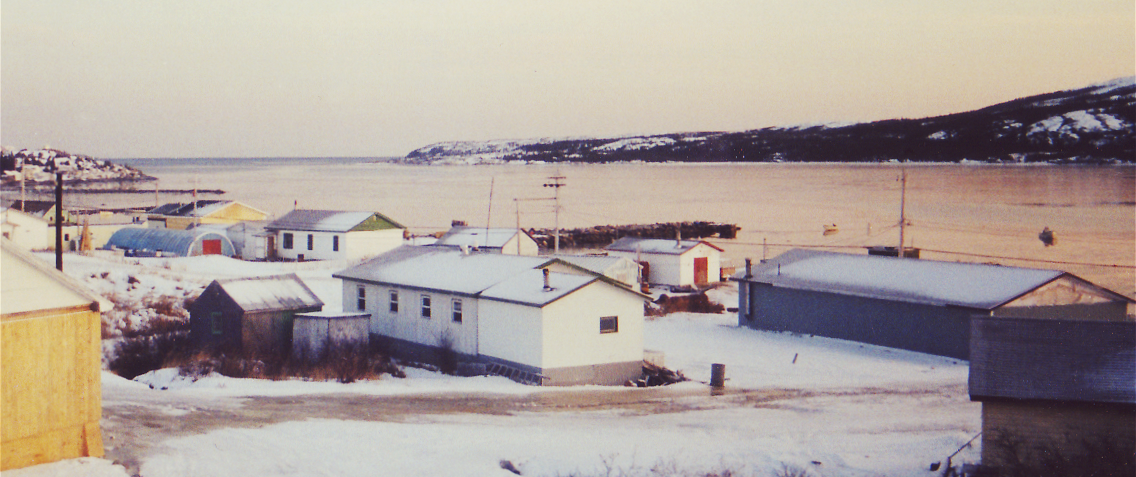
Late 20th century view of Makkovik in winter.

In January 2012, Makkovik received notable media attention after 14-year old Burton Winters froze to death after his snowmobile broke down on the ice just outside of the community.

The population is mainly composed of residents of mixed European and Inuit heritage. Ninety five people in Makkovik claimed to have Norwegian ancestry in the 2016 census.

=== United States Air Force base ===
For three years in the late 1950s, the United States Air Force operated a remote radar base approximately 15 km (9.3 mi) north of the settlement. Called Cape Makkovik, it was constructed between 1955 and 1957 and operated until 1961, and dismantled later in the decade. It was a "gap-filler" in the Pinetree Line set up to monitor the skies for aircraft approaching from the north.

== Geography ==
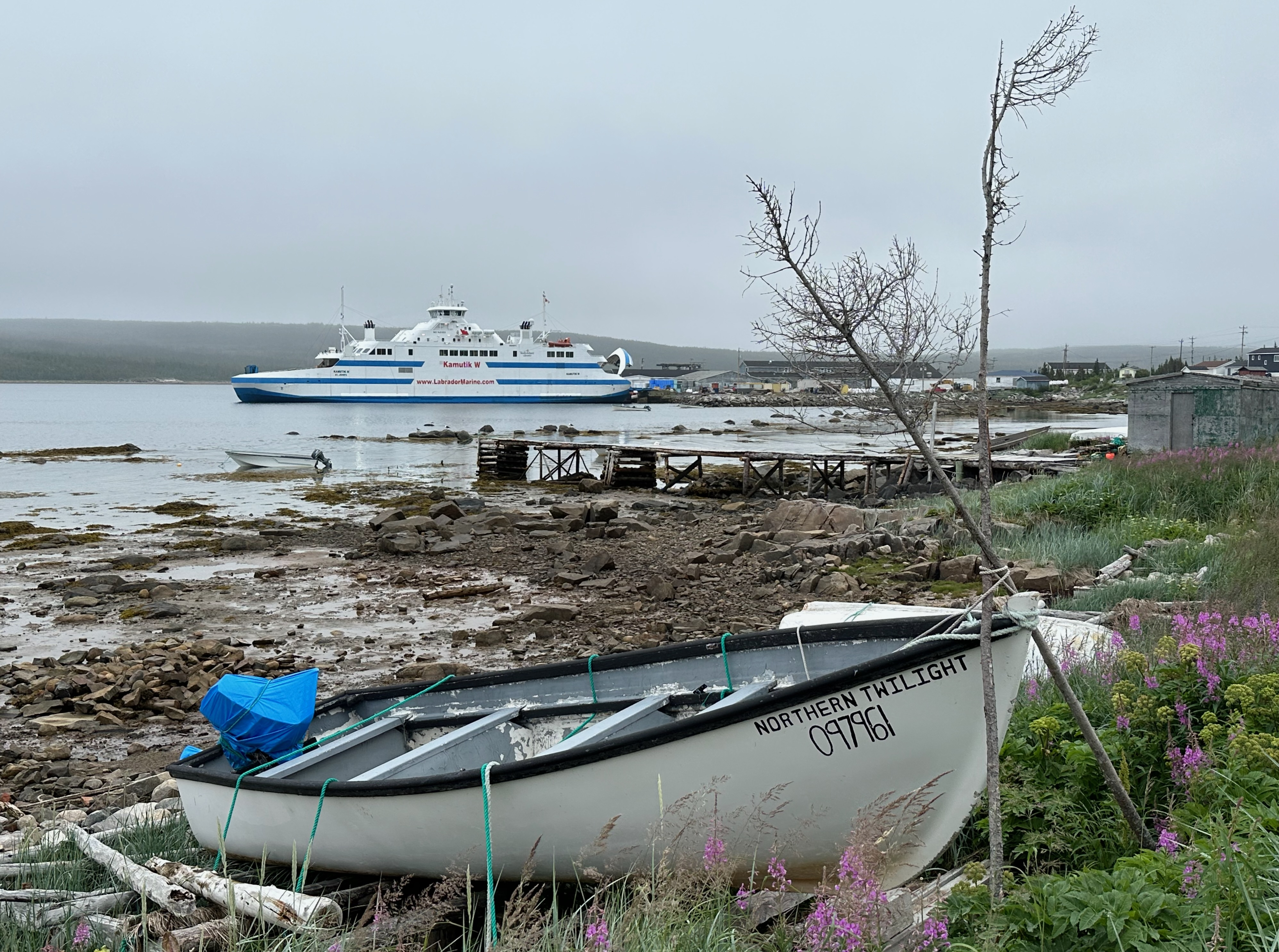
The Makkovik waterfront with the Kamutik W ferry at port in the distance.

The community lies at the end of a peninsula in northern Labrador about 215 km (134 mi) northeast of Happy Valley-Goose Bay. Travel is by air year round (served by Makkovik Airport) and by boat in summer. Winter travel is by snowmobile. The community is situated on a sheltered bay in a saddle between two hills. In the lee of the northernmost hill is a large copse of tall spruce trees, which is remarkable given the paucity of tree cover for miles around. Now known as the Moravian Wood, there is a small cemetery in the centre.

== Demographics ==
In the 2021 Canadian census conducted by Statistics Canada, Makkovik had a population of 365 living in 142 of its 154 total private dwellings, a change of −3.2% from its 2016 population of 377. With a land area of 2.95 km^{2} (1.14 sq mi), it had a population density of 123.7/km^{2} in 2021.

== Geology ==
The community is located in the Makkovik Province, a Paleoproterozoic accretionary belt which is the smallest defined tectonic component of the Canadian Shield. The Makkovik Province is separated from the Nain Province to the north by the Kanairiktok Shear Zone and from the Grenville Province to the south by the Grenville Front, which marks the northern limit of the widespread Grenvillian deformation. Prior to the opening of the Labrador Sea the Makkovik Province lay adjacent to the Ketilidian mobile belt which currently forms part of Southwest Greenland.

== Climate ==
Like most of Labrador, Makkovik has a subarctic climate (Köppen Dfc) with short, mild summers and very cold winters. Typically for its region but unusually for subarctic regions generally, precipitation is high with a minimum from March to May. This high precipitation and cool summers is due to the powerful influence of the Icelandic Low and the Labrador Current on its western side, and gives very heavy snowfall of 411.6 cm (162.0 in) per year with an average maximum cover of 69 cm (27 in) during March and April. The greatest snow depth was 152 cm (60 in) on April 17, 1997. Unlike most places with a pronounced subarctic climate, Makkovik has a pronounced seasonal lag with August being much warmer than July and September averaging slightly warmer than June.

Climate data for Makkovik (Makkovik Airport) Climate ID: 8502NHR; coordinates 55°04′56″N 59°11′19″W; elevation: 70.4 m (231 ft); 1981–2010 normals
Month	Jan	Feb	Mar	Apr	May	Jun	Jul	Aug	Sep	Oct	Nov	Dec	Year
Record high humidex	10.8	8.3	12.8	15.5	27.0	36.6	42.6	42.5	31.4	20.6	16.9	8.5	42.6
Record high °C (°F)	12.0 (53.6)	10.0 (50.0)	13.0 (55.4)	14.0 (57.2)	28.0 (82.4)	34.5 (94.1)	33.5 (92.3)	34.5 (94.1)	29.0 (84.2)	18.5 (65.3)	16.0 (60.8)	14.0 (57.2)	34.5 (94.1)
Mean daily maximum °C (°F)	−12.6 (9.3)	−12.1 (10.2)	−6.2 (20.8)	0.5 (32.9)	6.8 (44.2)	12.5 (54.5)	16.5 (61.7)	17.2 (63.0)	12.4 (54.3)	5.7 (42.3)	−1.1 (30.0)	−7.5 (18.5)	2.7 (36.8)
Daily mean °C (°F)	−16.7 (1.9)	−16.5 (2.3)	−10.6 (12.9)	−3.1 (26.4)	2.8 (37.0)	7.8 (46.0)	11.6 (52.9)	12.6 (54.7)	8.6 (47.5)	2.8 (37.0)	−3.9 (25.0)	−11.0 (12.2)	−1.3 (29.7)
Mean daily minimum °C (°F)	−20.8 (−5.4)	−20.7 (−5.3)	−15.0 (5.0)	−6.8 (19.8)	−1.2 (29.8)	3.1 (37.6)	6.7 (44.1)	7.9 (46.2)	4.7 (40.5)	−0.1 (31.8)	−6.7 (19.9)	−14.5 (5.9)	−5.3 (22.5)
Record low °C (°F)	−37.0 (−34.6)	−37.0 (−34.6)	−32.5 (−26.5)	−25.0 (−13.0)	−14.0 (6.8)	−3.5 (25.7)	−1.0 (30.2)	0.0 (32.0)	−3.5 (25.7)	−15.5 (4.1)	−22.0 (−7.6)	−33.5 (−28.3)	−37.0 (−34.6)
Record low wind chill	−53	−58	−51	−39	−23	−12	−4	0	−7	−27	−35	−53	−58
Average precipitation mm (inches)	72.6 (2.86)	75.1 (2.96)	72.9 (2.87)	61.8 (2.43)	52.0 (2.05)	94.0 (3.70)	101.0 (3.98)	97.6 (3.84)	91.9 (3.62)	91.6 (3.61)	84.1 (3.31)	83.9 (3.30)	978.5 (38.53)
Average rainfall mm (inches)	2.5 (0.10)	1.5 (0.06)	7.2 (0.28)	15.4 (0.61)	33.1 (1.30)	84.3 (3.32)	101.1 (3.98)	97.6 (3.84)	90.5 (3.56)	72.7 (2.86)	22.2 (0.87)	10.9 (0.43)	539 (21.21)
Average snowfall cm (inches)	67.5 (26.6)	73.6 (29.0)	64.0 (25.2)	41.8 (16.5)	16.5 (6.5)	8.7 (3.4)	0.1 (0.0)	0.0 (0.0)	1.3 (0.5)	16.4 (6.5)	54.8 (21.6)	66.9 (26.3)	411.6 (162.1)
Average precipitation days (≥ 0.2 mm)	14.1	12.4	14.1	13.0	12.7	16.4	16.7	16.4	17.0	16.4	15.7	14.9	179.8
Average rainy days (≥ 0.2 mm)	0.81	0.48	2.3	4.4	9.2	15.6	16.7	16.4	16.8	13.1	5.0	2.3	103.09
Average snowy days (≥ 0.2 cm)	13.9	12.1	13.2	9.8	5.2	2.8	0.05	0.00	0.35	5.8	12.6	13.6	89.4
Source: Environment and Climate Change Canada

== Politics ==
Makkovik is governed by an AngajukKâk (currently Barry Andersen) and a five-member Inuit Community Government. The ICG consists of four members elected by the Inuit population (currently Bernie Andersen, Tony Andersen, Elizabeth Evans-Mitchell and Caroline Rideout) and one member elected by the non-Inuit population (currently Dion Rideout).

In the provincial House of Assembly, Makkovik is represented as part of the riding of Torngat Mountains which is currently represented by Lela Evans. Three of the four most recent MHAs for Torngat Mountains have been from Makkovik.

In the House of Commons, Makkovik is represented as part of Labrador which is currently represented by Philip Earle.

In the Nunatsiavut Assembly, Makkovik is represented as its own single-member electoral district. The current representative is Thomas Evans. Past representatives have been:

Years	Member
2006-2010	Todd Broomfield
2010-2014	Todd Broomfield
2014-2018	Kate Mitchell
2018-2019	Kate Mitchell
2020–2022	John Andersen
2022–present	Thomas Evans

== Panorama ==
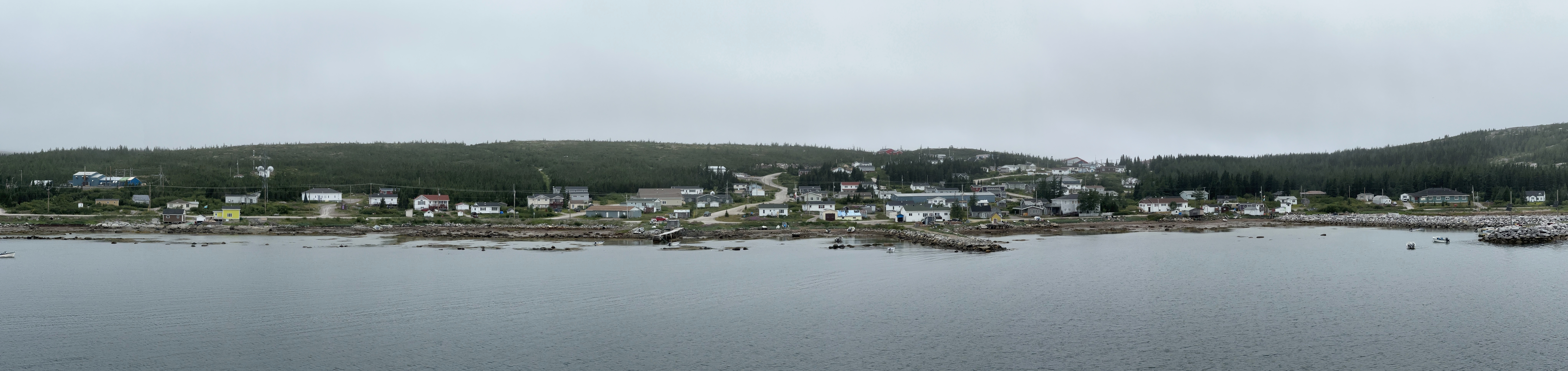
Panorama of Makkovik from aboard the Kamutik W in July 2023.
