= Rigolet =

Rigolet Tikigâksuagusik
- Inuit community
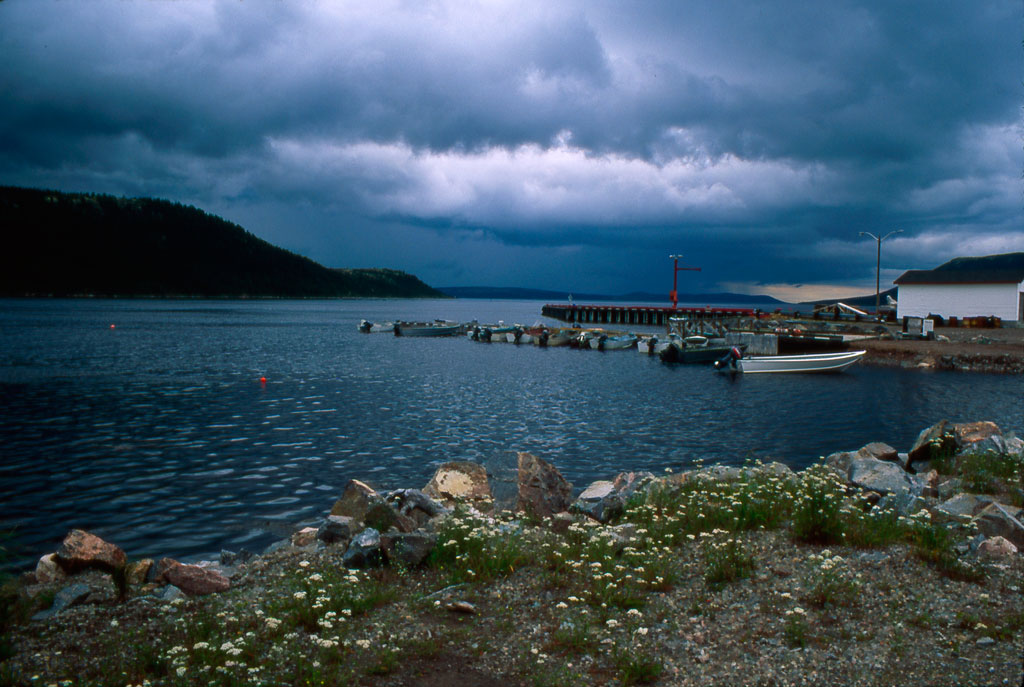

- Location of Rigolet in Labrador Rigolet (Canada)
- Coordinates: 54°10′47″N 58°25′44″W
- Country: Canada
- Province: Newfoundland and Labrador
- Region: Nunatsiavut
- Settled: 1735
- Incorporated: 1977

Government
  - Mayor (AngajukKâk): Chesley Sheppard
  - Federal MP: Philip Earle (L)
  - Provincial MHA: Lela Evans (PC)
  - Nunatsiavut Assembly members: Melva Williams

Population (2021)
  - Total: 327
- Time zone: UTC−04:00 (AST)
  - Summer (DST): UTC−03:00 (ADT)
- Area code: 709

Rigolet (Inuttitut: Tikigâksuagusik) (population 327) is a remote, coastal Labrador community established in 1735 by French-Canadian trader Louis Fornel. The town is the southernmost officially recognized Inuit community in the world. Located on Hamilton Inlet, which is at the entrance to fresh water Lake Melville; Rigolet is on salt water and is accessible to navigation during the winter. Although there is no road access, the community is accessible by snowmobile trail, the Rigolet Airport, or seasonally via a coastal ferry (MV Kamutik W) from Happy Valley-Goose Bay.

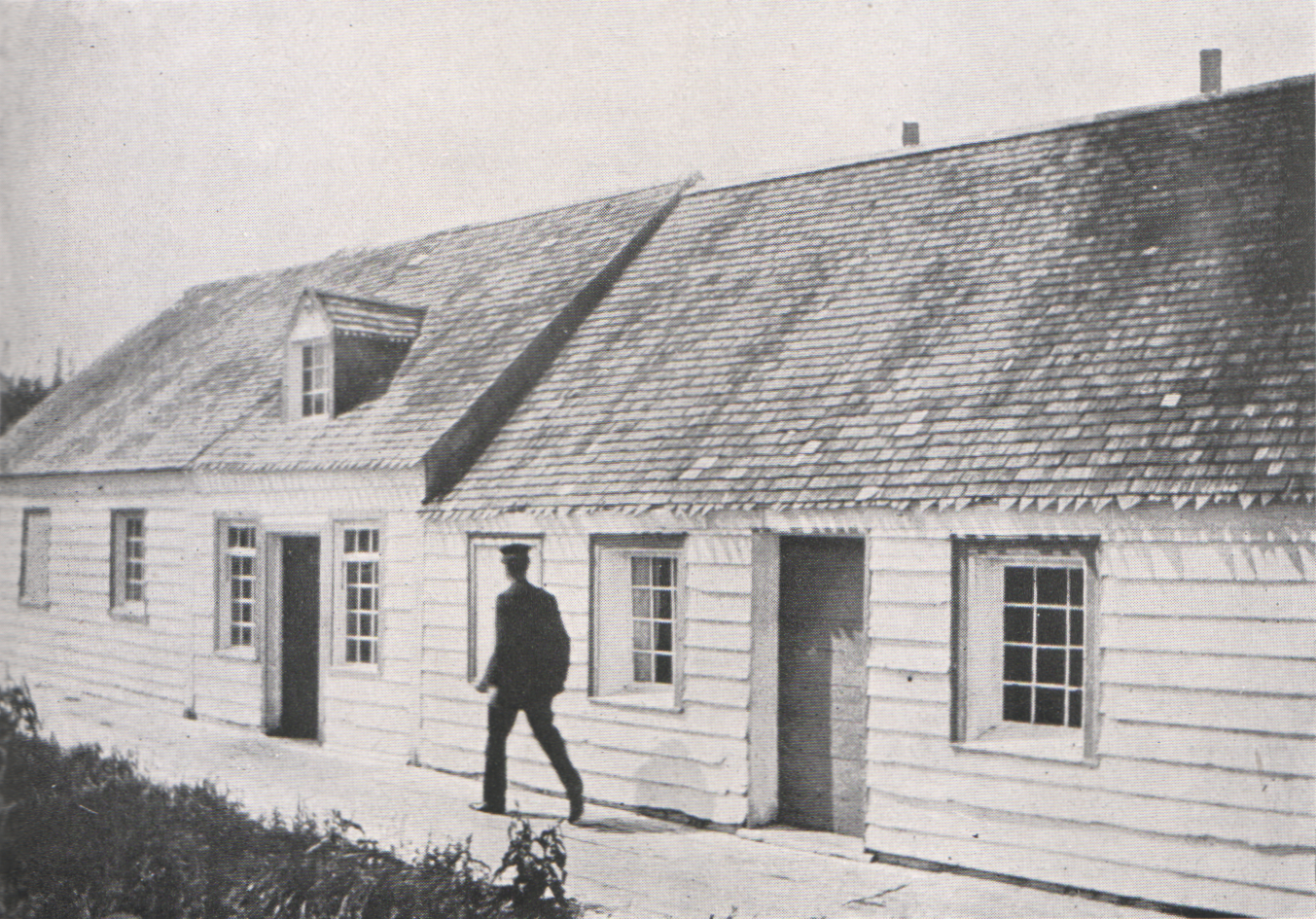
Fur trader in Rigolet, 1911

The Hudson's Bay Company established its trading post in Rigolet in 1836. The Hudson's Bay Company remained an active part of the community until 1987 when it was bought by the North West Company and was renamed the "Northern Store".

Rigolet is part of the Labrador Inuit Land Claims area and is overseen by the Nunatsiavut government. Approximately 5% of Rigolet's population is non Inuit.

Although there are still coniferous trees surrounding the village, a few kilometres northeast into Hamilton Inlet, the terrain changes drastically to a sub-arctic tundra. Minke and humpback whales are commonly observed in nearby waters.

In John Wyndham's post-apocalyptic novel The Chrysalids, set at an unspecified future date, Rigolet has become the town of Rigo and the capital of Labrador (which is one of the few habitable areas left in North America).

Rigolet is home to the longest boardwalk in North America. Rigolet's boardwalk stretches over 8 km, from Rigolet to Double Mer Point. The first phase of the boardwalk was completed in 1997 and the last extension of the boardwalk was completed in 2015.

== Demographics ==
In the 2021 Census of Population conducted by Statistics Canada, Rigolet had a population of 327 living in 125 of its 134 total private dwellings, a change of 7.2% from its 2016 population of 305. With a land area of 5.27 km^{2} (2.03 sq mi), it had a population density of 62.0/km^{2} (160.7/sq mi) in 2021.

== See also ==
- List of municipalities in Newfoundland and Labrador
- Nunatsiavut
