= Lela Evans =

Canadian politician

The Honorable Lela Evans ECNL MHA
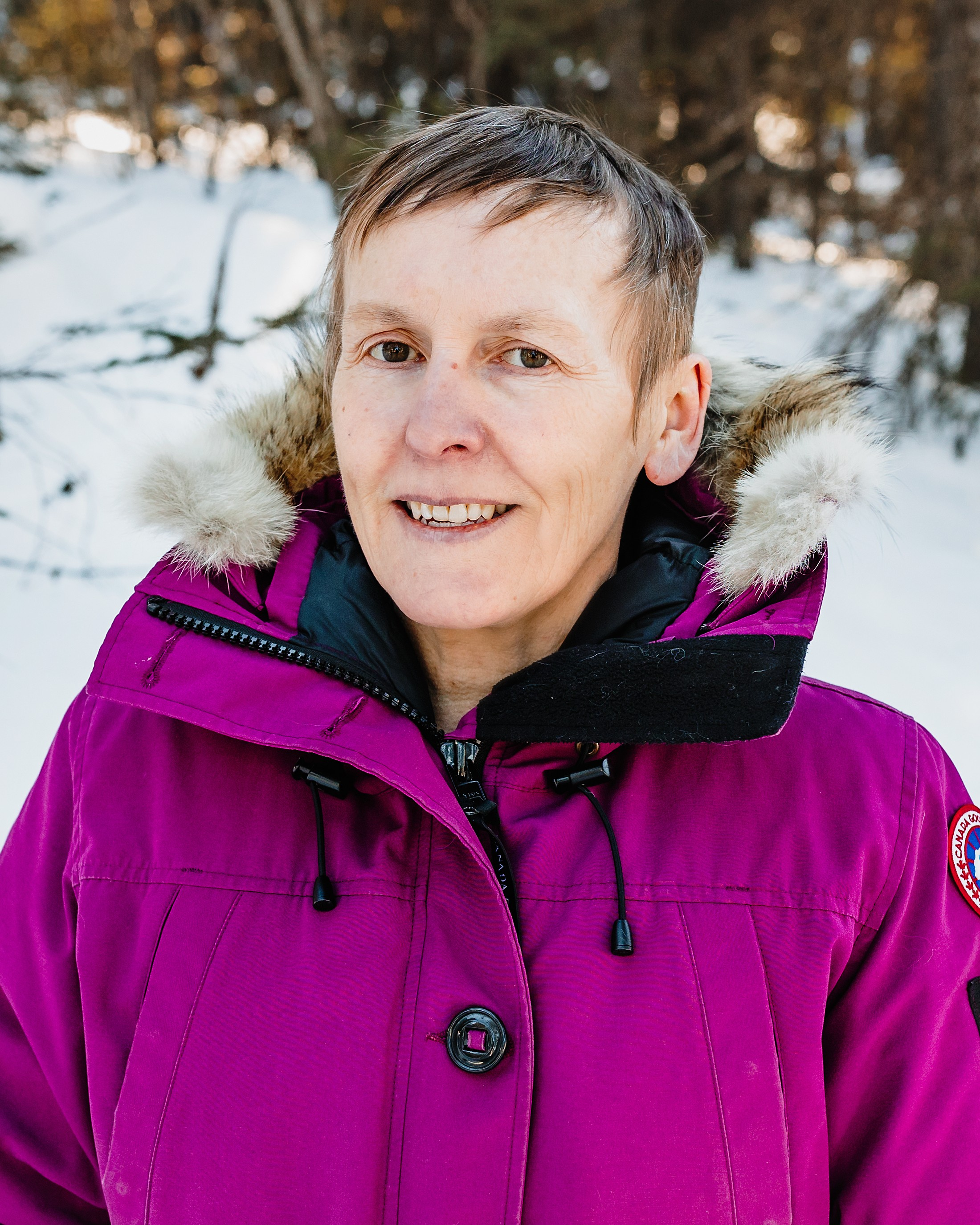
- Evans in 2023

Member of the Newfoundland and Labrador House of Assembly for Torngat Mountains
- Incumbent
- Assumed office May 16, 2019
- Preceded by: Randy Edmunds

Minister of Health and Community Services
- In office October 29, 2025 – August 20, 2026
- Preceded by: Krista Lynn Howell
- Succeeded by: Joedy Wall

Minister of Labrador Affairs
- Incumbent
- Assumed office October 29, 2025
- Preceded by: Lisa Dempster

Minister of Indigenous Relations & Reconciliation
- Incumbent
- Assumed office October 29, 2025
- Preceded by: Scott Reid

Minister of Women and Gender Equality
- Incumbent
- Assumed office February 24, 2026
- Preceded by: Helen Conway-Ottenheimer

Personal details
- Born: Makkovik
- Party: Progressive Conservative (2019–2021, 2024–present)
- Other political affiliations: Independent (2021–2022); New Democratic (2022–2024)
- Relations: Anthony Andersen (uncle); Wally Andersen (uncle); Randy Edmunds (cousin)
- Education: Memorial University of Newfoundland

Lela Margaret Ann Evans is a Canadian politician, who was elected to the Newfoundland and Labrador House of Assembly in the 2019 provincial election. She represents the electoral district of Torngat Mountains as a Progressive Conservative. Having been elected as a PC MHA, she left the party in 2021 and joined the New Democratic Party in 2022. She returned to the PCs in 2024. She was first elected in the 2019 provincial election and was re-elected in 2021.

Evans has over 20 years experience in the environmental field, including environmental assessments, mining and construction.

== Biography ==
Evans was born in Makkovik, a community in Nunatsiavut, Labrador and she is of Norwegian and Inuit descent. Evans is the daughter of Annie Evans and niece of feminist activist Ruth Flowers. In 2016, Evans joined protests against the Lower Churchill Project despite working for the company developing the project, Nalcor Energy. Evans has also worked as a first-aid instructor and at the Voisey's Bay Mine. Evans has also served as a part of a team conducting community consultations on the Uranium mining moratorium in northern Labrador. Evans is a graduate of Memorial University of Newfoundland.

Evans is openly lesbian.

=== Politics ===
In an interview with The Independent, Evans stated that she had to quit her job to run as a candidate in the 2019 election because her employer would not allow her to take a leave of absence. She was nominated as the Progressive Conservative candidate against her cousin and MHA Randy Edmunds. Evans went on to defeat Edmunds in an upset. She considered herself to be "putting the P in PC," meaning that she considers herself to be progressive in her political beliefs.

Evans has called for the Trans-Labrador Highway to be extended to reach communities in the northern part of Labrador.

On October 25, 2021, Evans left the PC Party to sit as an independent in the House of Assembly. On March 7, 2022, Evans joined the NDP. On July 16, 2024, she rejoined the PC Party, calling new PC leader Tony Wakeham an "ally" and a "friend."

Evans was re-elected as a Progressive Conservative in the 2025 Newfoundland and Labrador general election.

On October 29, 2025 Evans was appointed to the Wakeham ministry Minister of Health and Community services, Minister of Mental Health and Addictions, Minister Responsible for NL Health Services. Minister of Labrador Affairs, and Minister of Indigenous Relations and Reconciliation.

On September 17, 2026, Evans voted to approve the Churchill Falls Definitive Cooperation and Implementation Agreement (DCIA) in the House of Assembly along with the PC caucus.

=== Cancer diagnosis ===
During the 2026 budget speech, Evans was absent from legislature for the first half of the speech, as it coincided with a biopsy. On June 3, it was announced to the public that she had been diagnosed with breast cancer.

== Election results ==
2025 Newfoundland and Labrador general election: Torngat Mountains
Party	Candidate	Votes	%	±%
Progressive Conservative	Lela Evans	859	95.66	+6.86
Liberal	Tony Powell	29	3.23	-0.15
New Democratic	MK Morris	10	1.11	-6.71
Total valid votes		898		
Total rejected ballots				
Turnout				
Eligible voters				
Progressive Conservative hold		Swing		+3.51

Torngat Mountains – 2021 Newfoundland and Labrador general election
Party	Candidate	Votes	%	±%
Progressive Conservative	Lela Evans	420	88.79%	
New Democratic	Patricia Johnson-Castle	37	7.82%	
Liberal	Devon Ryan	16	3.38%	
Total valid votes		473		
Total rejected ballots				
Turnout				
Eligible voters				

Torngat Mountains – 2019 Newfoundland and Labrador general election
Party	Candidate	Votes	%	±%
Progressive Conservative	Lela Evans	623	56.58%	
Liberal	Randy Edmunds	478	43.42%	
Total valid votes		1,101		
Total rejected ballots				
Turnout				
Eligible voters				

Canada – 2018 Nunatsiavut general election
Name	Vote	%
Edward Blake-Rudkowski	477	38.07%
Roland Saunders	258	20.59%
Lela Evans	234	18.68%
Charlotte Winters-Fost	194	15.48%
Selina Adams	90	7.18%
Total Valid Ballots	1,253	100%
