= Natuashish =

- Indian reserve
- Natuashish Indian Reserve No. 2
- Location in Newfoundland and Labrador.
- Coordinates: 55°55′00″N 61°07′30″W
- Country: Canada
- Province: Newfoundland and Labrador
- Settled: 2002

Government
  - Chief: Patricia Andrew
  - Federal MP: Philip Earle (L)
  - Provincial MHA: Lela Evans (PC)

Population (2021)
  - Total: 856
- Time zone: UTC-4 (AST)
- Area code: 709

Natuashish is an Innu community in the Canadian province of Newfoundland and Labrador. The community is inhabited by the Mushuau Innu First Nation. Natuashish became a federal Indian reserve in 2003.

Natuashish (Little Sango Pond) was established in 2002 as a planned community in the hopes of resolving the social problems that had plagued the prior community of Davis Inlet, 15 kilometres (9.3 mi) away. The population of Natuashish at the 2021 Census was 856, down from 938 in 2016.

Initial reports suggested that the Canadian government's plan of renewal and healing had been a failure, as the community was still plagued with alcohol and drug abuse. The government was accused of creating a system overburdened with bureaucracy, and not adequately addressing the issues. The local tribal band was accused of corruption, as was proven in a 2005 CBC News report in which it was shown that the leadership was trafficking drugs and other illicit substances to maintain power.

The community's attempt to resolve its problem with alcoholism led to a ban on the sale, purchase, and possession of alcohol within the reserve. The bylaw was originally passed in 2008 by a margin of two votes. The prohibition bylaw was upheld in a subsequent referendum held in the community in March 2010.

The community has continued to struggle with drug abuse and youth boredom. As recently as 2017, gas sniffing by youths has been a notable issue.

Natuashish is inaccessible by road and may be reached only by air or sea. The community is served by the Natuashish Airport.
