= Happy Valley-Goose Bay =

- Town
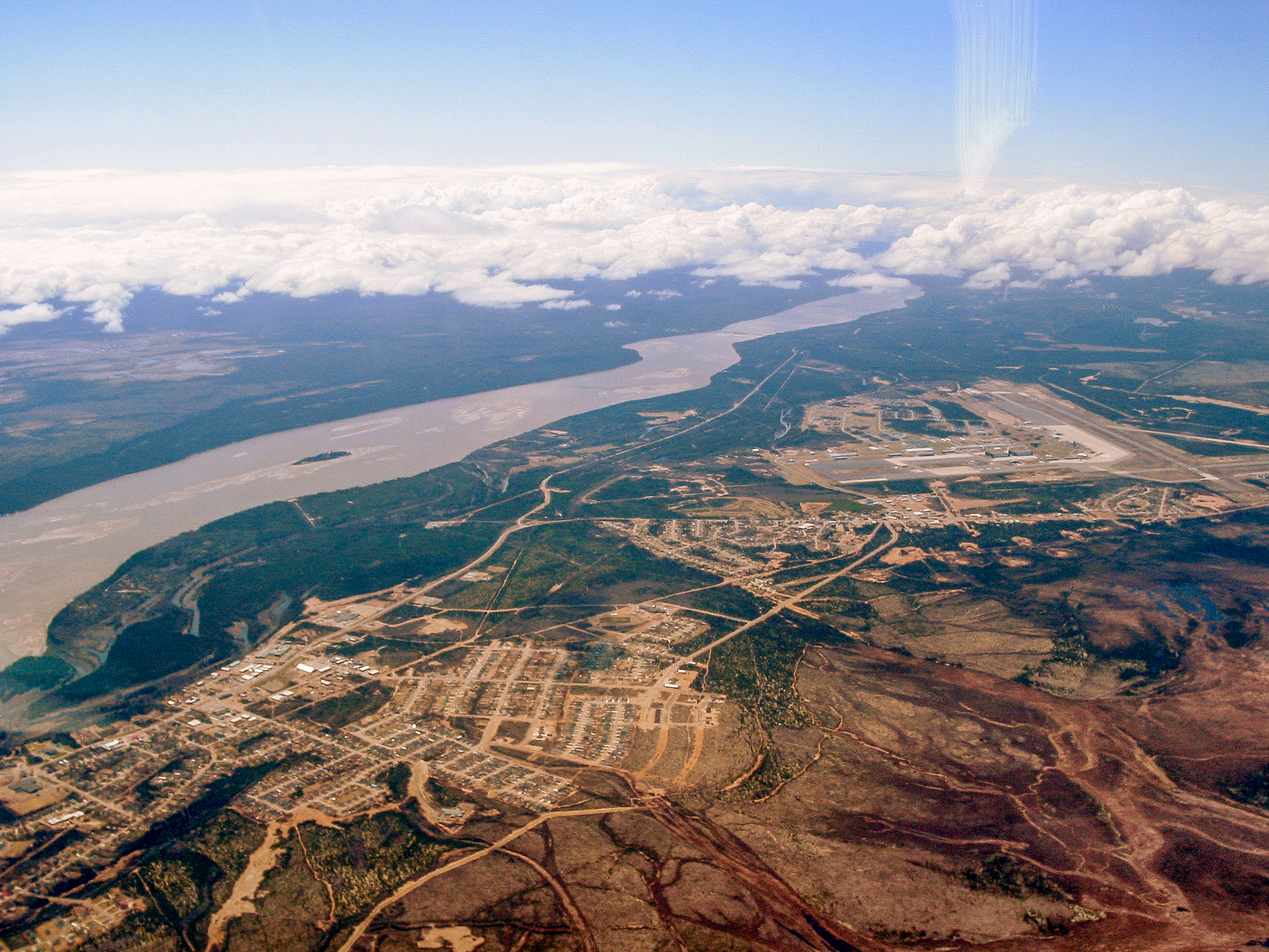
- Goose Bay Labrador in May 2008

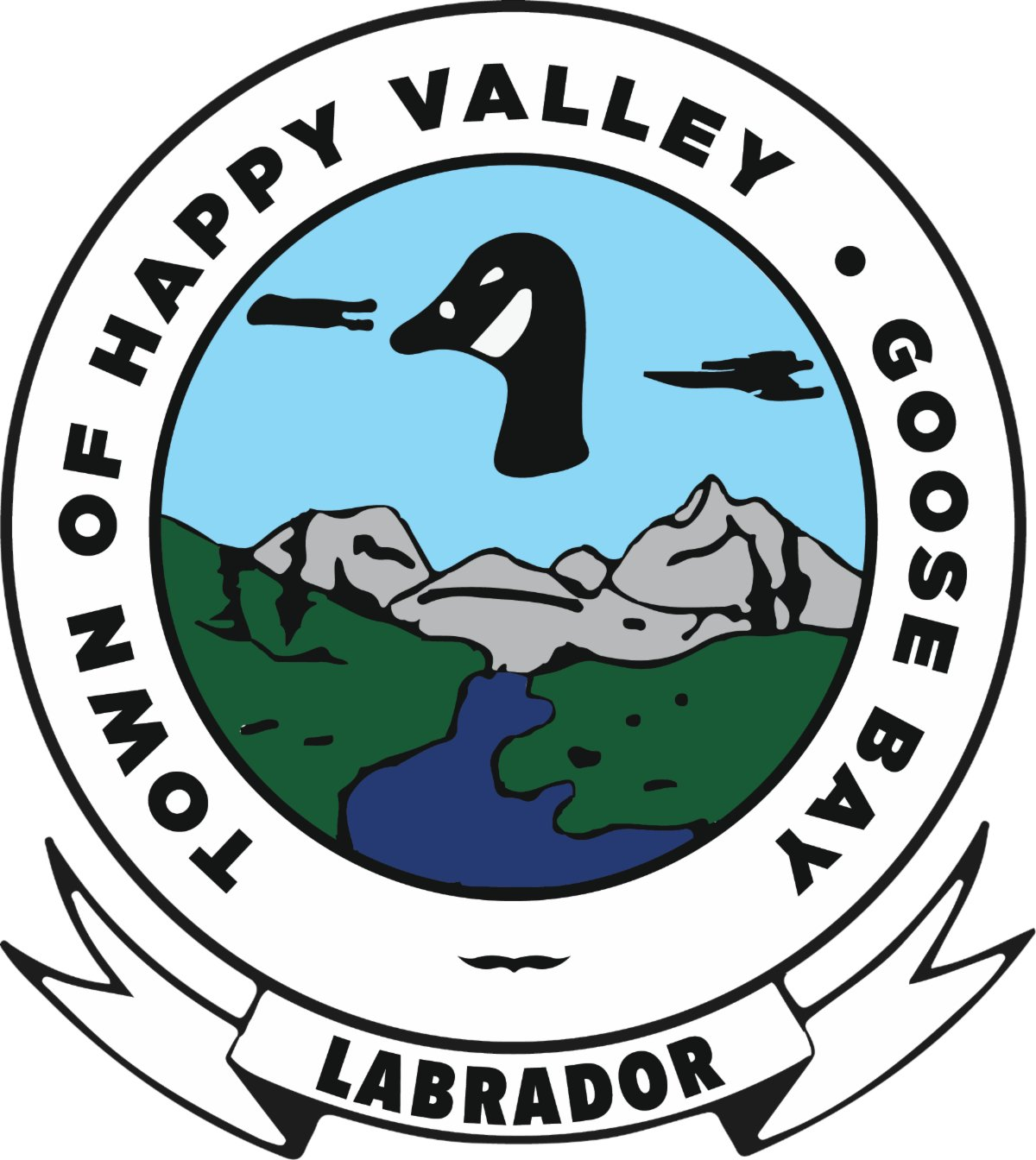
- Seal
- Motto: "A World of Opportunities"
- Location within Newfoundland and Labrador
- Coordinates: 53°20′30″N 60°26′56″W
- Country: Canada
- Province: Newfoundland and Labrador
- Census division: 10
- Provincial electoral district: Lake Melville
- Federal electoral district: Labrador
- Settled: 1942
- Incorporated: 1973

Government
  - Type: Town Council
  - Mayor: W. Bert Pomeroy
  - MHA: Keith Russell (IND)
  - MP: Philip Earle (LIB)
  - Nunatsiavut Assembly members: Gerald Asivak; Wally Andersen

Area (2021)
  - Total: 305.69 km^{2} (118.03 sq mi)
- Elevation: 12 m (39 ft)

Population (2021)
  - Total: 8,040
  - Density: 26.4/km^{2} (68/sq mi)
- Time zone: UTC−04:00 (AST)
  - Summer (DST): UTC−03:00 (ADT)
- Postal Codes: A0P1C0, A0P1E0, & A0P1S0
- Area code: 709
- Highways: Route 500 (Trans-Labrador Highway) Route 510 (Labrador South Highway) Route 520 (North West River Road)
- Website: townhvgb.com

Happy Valley-Goose Bay (Inuit: Vâli) is a town in the province of Newfoundland and Labrador, Canada. Located in central Labrador on the coast of Lake Melville and the Churchill River, Happy Valley-Goose Bay is the largest population centre in the region with an estimated 8,040 residents in 2021.

Incorporated in 1973, it comprises the former town of Happy Valley and the Local Improvement District of Goose Bay. Built on a large sandy plateau in 1941, the town is home to the largest military air base in northeastern North America, CFB Goose Bay.

== History ==
In the summer of 1941, Eric Fry, an employee of the Canadian Department of Mines and Resources on loan to the Royal Canadian Air Force, selected a large sandy plateau near the mouth of the Goose River to build the Goose Bay Air Force Base. Docking facilities for transportation of goods and personnel were built at Terrington Basin.

Goose Air Base became a landing and refuelling stop for the Atlantic Ferry route. Soon after the site was selected, men from the coast of Labrador began working on the base. With World War II creating a sense of urgency, it took only five months to build an operational military airport on the leased territory.

The first settlers to the area came from coastal Labrador to work with McNamara Construction Company, which was contracted to build the Goose Bay Air Force Base. Their first choice was Otter Creek, where they were told that it would be too close to the base. A new location was chosen based upon the requirement to be at least 8.0 km (5 mi) from the base. In 1942, a new site was chosen that was first called Refugee Cove; it was not until 1955 that it eventually was renamed Happy Valley.

The first three families to arrive to work at the construction of the base were the Saunders from Davis Inlet, the Broomfields from Big Bay, and the Perraults from Makkovik.

Happy Valley's first school was operated by a Mrs. Perrault from her home until 1946, when the Royal Canadian Air Force donated a building. The old one-room school was bought by Bella and Clarence Brown in early 1962 and turned into a family residence. In 1949, the Air Force donated a second building which became the North Star School. Mrs. Perrault also became Happy Valley's first librarian. Bella Brown took over as Happy Valley's librarian when the North Star School's second building was donated as the new library.

The Grenfell Mission operated the first medical facilities when it opened a nursing station in 1951. In 1963, the provincial government built Paddon Memorial Hospital.

== Canadian Forces Base ==
CFB Goose Bay saw a reduction of NATO low-level tactical flight training in the decade 1996–2005, and the town faced an uncertain future as the federal government reduced the number of permanent Royal Canadian Air Force personnel to fewer than 100 all-ranks. The last NATO nations to use CFB Goose Bay for flight training, Germany and Italy, did not renew their leases after terminating in early 2006.

The runway at Happy Valley-Goose Bay was also an alternative, but unused, landing site for NASA's now-decommissioned Space Shuttle, because of its size and length.

== Local Improvement District of Goose Bay ==
Prior to its amalgamation with Happy Valley, the Local Improvement District of Goose Bay was set up in 1970 and included an area called Spruce Park and the Canadian Department of Transport Housing areas. It grew to include other areas of the base until 1973, when it comprised all of the base area.

== Geography ==
Happy Valley-Goose Bay lies at the southwest end of Lake Melville near the mouth of the Churchill River. The town is located on the southern shore of a peninsula created by Terrington Basin to the north and Goose Bay at the south.

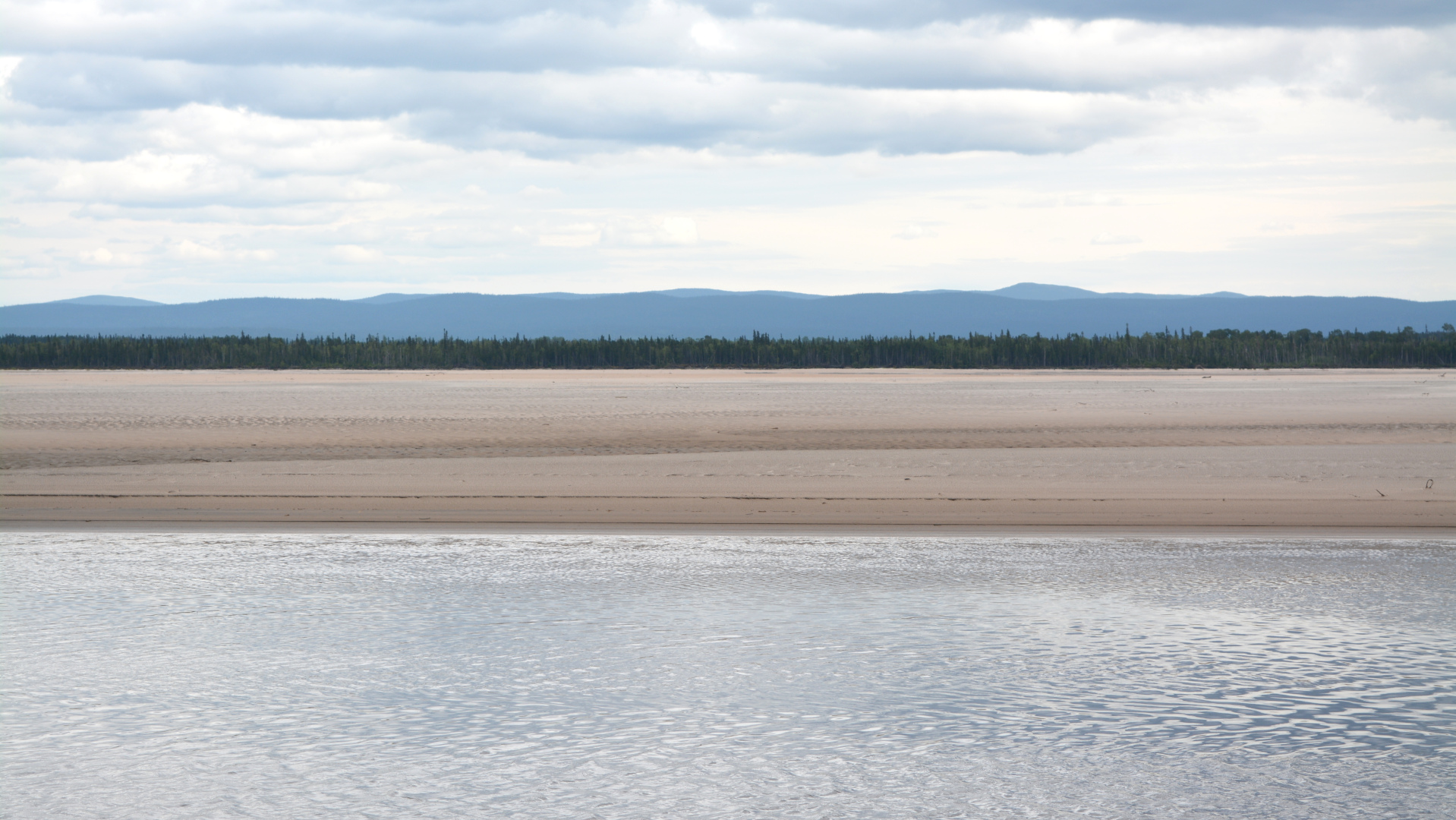
Churchill River near Happy Valley-Goose Bay

=== Climate ===
Happy Valley-Goose Bay displays a borderline humid continental climate (Köppen Dfb), close to a subarctic climate (Köppen Dfc), marked by significant snowfall during the winter, which has average highs around −12 °C (10 °F). Summer highs, on the other hand, average 20 °C (68 °F). The average high temperature stays at or below freezing for five months of the year and the low does so for six months. Snowfall averages nearly 406 cm (160 in) per year, and can occur in all months except July and August. Precipitation, at nearly 940 mm (37 in), is significant year-round and is heavy for a subarctic climate at its latitude.

Climate data for Happy Valley-Goose Bay (CFB Goose Bay) WMO ID: 71816; coordinates 53°19′N 60°25′W; elevation: 48.8 m (160 ft); 1991−2020 normals, extremes 1941−present
Month	Jan	Feb	Mar	Apr	May	Jun	Jul	Aug	Sep	Oct	Nov	Dec	Year
Record high °C (°F)	11.2 (52.2)	10.6 (51.1)	16.4 (61.5)	21.7 (71.1)	32.7 (90.9)	36.2 (97.2)	37.8 (100.0)	36.5 (97.7)	33.6 (92.5)	25.8 (78.4)	17.4 (63.3)	11.7 (53.1)	37.8 (100.0)
Mean maximum °C (°F)	2.1 (35.8)	1.3 (34.3)	7.5 (45.5)	14.3 (57.7)	24.2 (75.6)	29.6 (85.3)	31.2 (88.2)	30.6 (87.1)	25.5 (77.9)	17.8 (64.0)	10.7 (51.3)	4.2 (39.6)	32.9 (91.2)
Mean daily maximum °C (°F)	−12.3 (9.9)	−10.4 (13.3)	−3.6 (25.5)	3.6 (38.5)	11.0 (51.8)	17.3 (63.1)	21.2 (70.2)	20.8 (69.4)	15.3 (59.5)	7.5 (45.5)	0.0 (32.0)	−7.3 (18.9)	5.3 (41.5)
Daily mean °C (°F)	−17.0 (1.4)	−16.0 (3.2)	−9.5 (14.9)	−1.4 (29.5)	5.6 (42.1)	11.7 (53.1)	15.8 (60.4)	15.6 (60.1)	10.3 (50.5)	3.8 (38.8)	−3.6 (25.5)	−11.6 (11.1)	0.3 (32.5)
Mean daily minimum °C (°F)	−21.7 (−7.1)	−21.5 (−6.7)	−15.3 (4.5)	−6.4 (20.5)	0.1 (32.2)	6.1 (43.0)	10.5 (50.9)	10.3 (50.5)	5.4 (41.7)	0.1 (32.2)	−7.3 (18.9)	−15.7 (3.7)	−4.6 (23.7)
Mean minimum °C (°F)	−31.8 (−25.2)	−31.0 (−23.8)	−27.1 (−16.8)	−16.8 (1.8)	−5.3 (22.5)	−0.1 (31.8)	4.9 (40.8)	3.9 (39.0)	−1.0 (30.2)	−7.1 (19.2)	−17.2 (1.0)	−27.2 (−17.0)	−32.9 (−27.2)
Record low °C (°F)	−38.9 (−38.0)	−39.4 (−38.9)	−35.6 (−32.1)	−29.7 (−21.5)	−15.0 (5.0)	−4.2 (24.4)	0.1 (32.2)	0.0 (32.0)	−6.7 (19.9)	−17.0 (1.4)	−26.1 (−15.0)	−36.7 (−34.1)	−39.4 (−38.9)
Average precipitation mm (inches)	66.7 (2.63)	55.9 (2.20)	63.9 (2.52)	63.2 (2.49)	69.9 (2.75)	87.7 (3.45)	111.8 (4.40)	107.2 (4.22)	86.0 (3.39)	88.1 (3.47)	74.9 (2.95)	62.6 (2.46)	937.8 (36.92)
Average rainfall mm (inches)	2.0 (0.08)	3.3 (0.13)	4.5 (0.18)	20.7 (0.81)	51.1 (2.01)	86.9 (3.42)	111.8 (4.40)	107.2 (4.22)	85.8 (3.38)	67.2 (2.65)	26.3 (1.04)	6.6 (0.26)	573.4 (22.57)
Average snowfall cm (inches)	75.0 (29.5)	60.4 (23.8)	67.4 (26.5)	45.8 (18.0)	19.1 (7.5)	0.8 (0.3)	0.0 (0.0)	0.0 (0.0)	0.2 (0.1)	21.5 (8.5)	51.6 (20.3)	64.1 (25.2)	405.9 (159.8)
Average precipitation days (≥ 0.2 mm)	15.6	12.4	14.0	13.8	14.7	16.9	18.2	17.6	16.6	16.5	14.3	14.5	185.0
Average rainy days (≥ 0.2 mm)	1.6	1.5	2.0	6.0	12.5	16.9	18.2	17.6	16.6	13.7	6.2	2.6	115.4
Average snowy days (≥ 0.2 cm)	15.7	12.4	13.4	10.6	5.3	0.6	0.0	0.0	0.2	5.5	11.2	13.8	88.6
Average dew point °C (°F)	−22.4 (−8.3)	−22.2 (−8.0)	−15.1 (4.8)	−6.9 (19.6)	−1.1 (30.0)	5.1 (41.2)	9.9 (49.8)	9.6 (49.3)	5.0 (41.0)	−0.4 (31.3)	−7.8 (18.0)	−17.0 (1.4)	−5.2 (22.6)
Mean monthly sunshine hours	96.9	130.2	139.1	162.4	190.0	175.0	196.6	193.9	121.9	90.4	75.8	72.5	1,644.7
Percentage possible sunshine	38.5	47.1	37.9	38.7	38.7	34.5	38.6	42.3	31.9	27.5	29.0	30.7	36.3
Source 1: Environment and Climate Change Canada (sunshine 1981–2010)
Source 2: weatherstats.ca (for dewpoint and monthly&yearly average absolute maximum&minimum temperature)

== Demographics ==
Historical populations
Year	Pop.	±%
1961	2,861	—
1971	5,433	+89.9%
1981	7,103	+30.7%
1991	8,610	+21.2%
1996	8,655	+0.5%
2001	7,969	−7.9%
2006	7,572	−5.0%
2011	7,552	−0.3%
2016	8,109	+7.4%
2021	8,040	−0.9%

Canada 2016 Census		Population	% of Total Population
Visible minority group Source:	South Asian	85	1.1%
Visible minority group Source:	Chinese	20	0.3%
Visible minority group Source:	Black	25	0.3%
Visible minority group Source:	Filipino	145	1.8%
Visible minority group Source:	Latin American	20	0.3%
Visible minority group Source:	Korean	10	0.1%
Visible minority group Source:	Japanese	10	0.1%
Visible minority group Source:	Other visible minority	10	0.1%
Visible minority group Source:	Mixed visible minority	25	0.3%
Total visible minority population		325	4.1%
Indigenous group Source:	First Nations	190	2.4%
Indigenous group Source:	Métis	1,515	19.2%
Indigenous group Source:	Inuit	1,865	23.7%
Total Indigenous population		3,565	45.2%
White		3,990	50.6%
Total population		8,109	99.8%

In the 2021 Canadian census conducted by Statistics Canada, Happy Valley-Goose Bay had a population of 8,040 living in 3,072 of its 3,390 total private dwellings, a change of −0.9% from its 2016 population of 8,109. With a land area of 304.52 km^{2} (117.58 sq mi), it had a population density of 26.4/km^{2} (68.4/sq mi) in 2021.

The 2011 census showed that Happy Valley-Goose Bay has outgrown Labrador City and is now the largest community in Labrador. However, Labrador West (a region consisting of Labrador City and a nearby community, Wabush) still has a higher population than Upper Lake Melville (which includes Happy Valley-Goose Bay and three nearby communities)

Mother tongue:

- English as first language: 91.3%
- French as first language: 1.0%
- English and French as first language: 0.1%
- Other as first language: 6.3%

== Transportation ==
=== Road ===
Happy Valley and Goose Bay are connected by the Trans-Labrador Highway with Labrador City and Baie-Comeau in Quebec. The road was extended south to link with an existing road from the Blanc Sablon - St. Barbe ferry. It opened in December 2009.

Prior to 1954, hardly any licence plates were issued to Labrador communities except for Happy Valley and the Goose Bay area. A series of small plates were issued to help fund road development. It was not until the mid-1960s that all of Labrador started using regular Newfoundland licence plates.

Since 1992, the road from Baie-Comeau to Wabush was connected to an open route year-round to Happy Valley-Goose Bay.

=== Water ===
The town was serviced by boat and container ship to the ports from Newfoundland and the port of Montreal. Most of the town's supplies were transported by container vessels brought to the docking facilities located at Terrington Basin. These facilities were operated by Transport Canada. The shipping season usually lasted from June to December. In the summer, a ferry service connects Happy Valley-Goose Bay with Cartwright.

=== Air ===
Air Canada and Eastern Provincial Airways were the first air carriers in the area to carry passengers from outside the area into CFB Goose Bay. Labrador Airways Limited provided air transportation to local communities. Located at Otter Creek is a seaplane base that also provided airlifts to local communities and tourist lodges in the interior of Labrador.

== Notable people ==
- Jennifer Hale, voice actress
- Heather Igloliorte, historian
- Daniel Nimick, soccer player
- Seamus O'Regan, politician
- Keith Russell, politician
- Doris Saunders, archivist
- Jennie Williams, photographer and filmmaker

== See also ==
- List of municipalities in Newfoundland and Labrador
