= Philip Earle =

Canadian politician

Philip Earle MP

Member of Parliament for Labrador
- Incumbent
- Assumed office April 28, 2025
- Preceded by: Yvonne Jones

Personal details
- Born: St. Anthony, Newfoundland and Labrador, Canada
- Party: Liberal

Philip Earle MP is a Canadian politician from the Liberal Party of Canada. He was elected Member of Parliament for Labrador in the 2025 Canadian federal election and was the first member of the 45th Parliament declared elected.

== Biography ==
Earle is a local businessman. He has worked as an airline executive. Earle was born in St. Anthony and grew up in L'Anse au Loup/ Forteau. He was appointed to the Premier’s Economic Recovery Team and served as a Commissioner at the Independent Appointments Commission.

At the time of the 2025 Canadian federal election, he lived in Happy Valley-Goose Bay.

== Electoral record ==
2025 Canadian federal election: Labrador
Party	Candidate	Votes	%	±%	Expenditures
Liberal	Philip Earle	5,811	51.50	+8.83	$70,409.30
Conservative	Ella Wallace	4,709	41.73	+11.38	$58,728.20
New Democratic	Marius Normore	764	6.77	−17.03	$5,023.73
Total valid votes/expense limit		11,284	98.53	+0.51	$128,378.11
Total rejected ballots		168	1.47	-0.51	
Turnout		11,452	57.18	+9.02	
Eligible voters		20,027			
Liberal hold		Swing		−1.28	
Source: Elections Canada
