= CCGS Cygnus =

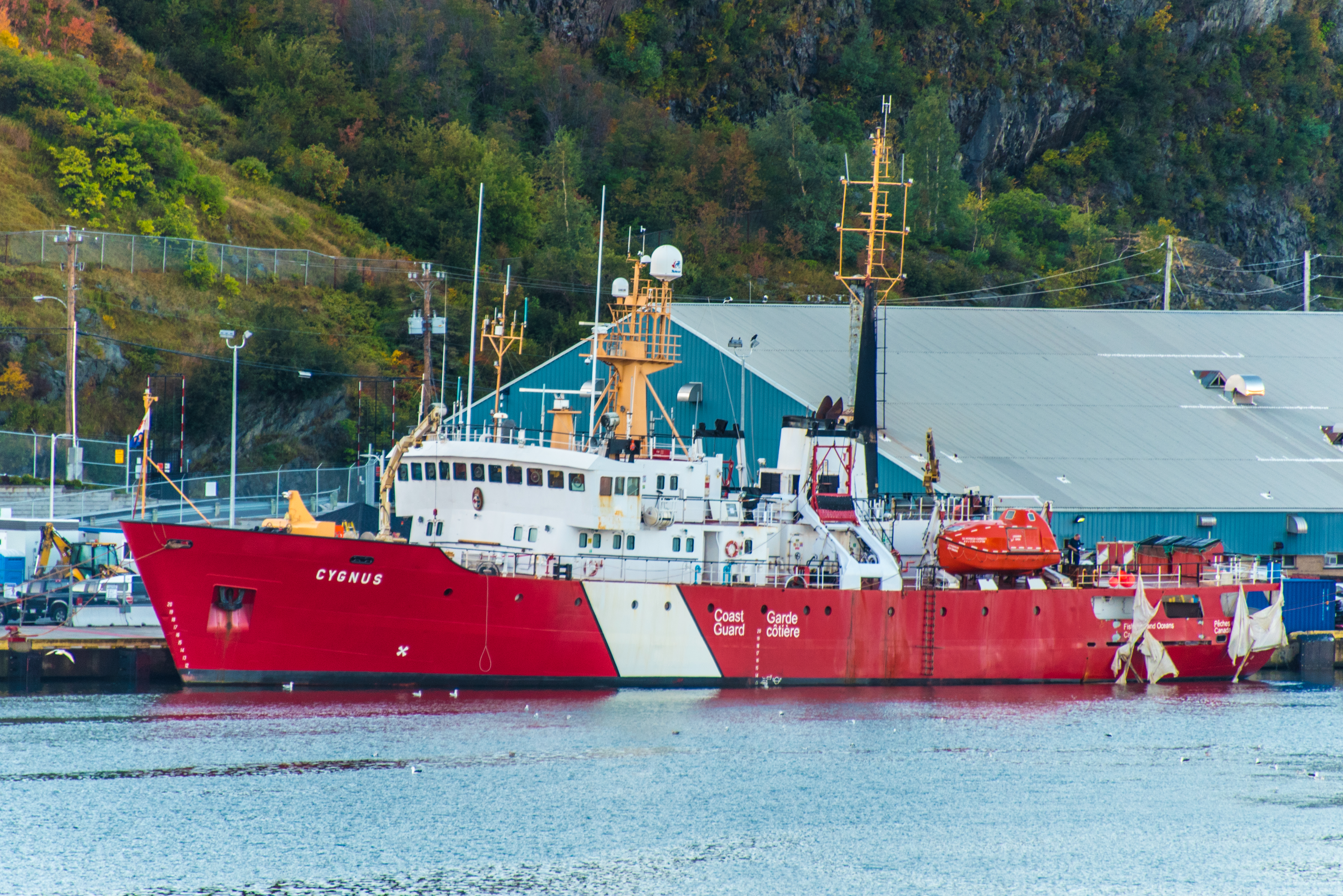
- CCGS Cygnus in St. John's Harbour, Newfoundland

History

Canada
- Name: Cygnus
- Namesake: Cygnus, constellation in the northern hemisphere
- Operator: Canadian Coast Guard
- Port of registry: Ottawa, Ontario
- Builder: Marystown Shipyard, Marystown
- Launched: 3 July 1981
- Commissioned: May 1981
- Refit: 1996
- Home port: CGS Base St. John's
- Identification: CGDW; IMO number: 7927831
- Status: in active service

General characteristics
- Class & type: Cape Roger-class fisheries patrol vessel
- Tonnage: 1,234 GT; 370 NT
- Displacement: 1,465 long tons (1,489 t)
- Length: 62.5 m (205 ft 1 in)
- Beam: 12.1 m (39 ft 8 in)
- Draught: 4.0 m (13 ft 1 in)
- Propulsion: 2 × Polar Nohab 12-cylinder diesel engines
- Speed: 16 knots (30 km/h)
- Range: 10,800 nmi (20,000 km) at 13 knots (24 km/h)
- Endurance: 25 days
- Complement: 19
- Armament: 2 × 12.7 mm (0.50 in) machine guns
- Aircraft carried: 1 × light helicopter
- Aviation facilities: Flight deck

CCGS Cygnus (Note: CCGS stands for Canadian Coast Guard Ship) is a Cape Roger-class fisheries patrol vessel of the Canadian Coast Guard. The ship entered service in 1981 and is used to monitor the fisheries along the Atlantic coast of Canada. During the Turbot War, Cygnus was among the Coast Guard vessels sent to monitor the European fishing fleet on the Grand Banks.

== Design and description ==
Cygnus is 62.5 m (205 ft 1 in) long overall with a beam of 12.1 m (39.70 ft) and a draught of 4.0 m (13.12 ft). The ship has a fully loaded displacement of 1,465 long tons (1,489 t), a gross tonnage (GT) of 1,234 and a 370 net tonnage (NT). The ship is propelled by two Polar Nohab F212V 12-cylinder geared diesel engines driving one controllable pitch propeller and bow thrusters creating 3,455 kW (4,633 hp). This gives the vessel a maximum speed of 16 knots (30 km/h). The vessel is equipped with one Caterpillar 3304 emergency generator. Cygnus carries 401.00 m^{3} (88,210 imp gal) of diesel fuel giving the vessel a range of 10,800 nautical miles (20,000 km) at 13 knots (24 km/h) and can stay at sea for up to 25 days.

The vessel is equipped with a flight deck located over the stern of the ship and can operate one light helicopter of the MBB Bo 105 or Bell 206L types. Unlike sister ship Cape Roger, Cygnus was not built with a hangar. The patrol vessel is armed with two 12.7 mm (0.50 in) machine guns. The ship has a complement of 19, with 8 officers and 11 crew. The vessel has 23 spare berths.

== Service history ==
The ship was constructed by Marystown Shipyard at their yard in Marystown, Newfoundland and Labrador with the yard number 30. Named for the constellation in the northern hemisphere, the patrol vessel was commissioned in May 1981. (Note: There is disagreement among the sources as to when the ship entered service. Saunders and the Canadian Coast Guard state that Cygnus entered service in 1981. The Miramar Ship Index and Maginley & Collin state it was in 1982. This discrepancy can occur when one source cites the launch date issued by the builder and another source references a later date when the vessel was officially put into service by the Coast Guard after staffing, training and verification of fit for station.) Cygnus is registered in Ottawa, Ontario and was initially assigned to the Coast Guard base at Dartmouth, Nova Scotia. The vessel later transferred to her current homeport at St. John's, Newfoundland and Labrador.

Cygnus is used primarily for patrolling the Atlantic Canada fisheries and coast, especially the Grand Banks of Newfoundland. In 1994, Canada and the European Union got into a dispute over fishing rights in Canadian waters with the two parties disagreeing over which party could set limits on catches. In June, during the height of what became known as the Turbot War, Cygnus was among the Coast Guard vessels deployed to monitor the European fishing fleet on the Grand Banks. In 2014, the patrol vessel underwent a $1.2 million refit by St. John's Dockyard in St. John's focusing on renewing the steel of the ship. On 9 February 2018, Cygnus returned to St. John's to undergo emergency repairs after the ship began taking on water through a leak around the propeller shaft. The ship had been on a fishery patrol 260 nautical miles (480 km; 300 mi) east of Newfoundland when the leak was noticed. Cygnus was escorted to port by the offshore supply vessel Atlantic Kingfisher and the Coast Guard ship CCGS Sir Wilfred Grenfell.

In February 2022, Cygnus was dispatched to search for survivors of the sunken fishing trawler Villa de Pitanxo off the coast of Newfoundland and Labrador. There were three survivors and a further nine bodies recovered with twelve people missing before the search was called off due to inclement weather.
