= ACCO appliance =

An ACCO appliance (acrylic cervical occipital anchorage) is an appliance in the field of orthodontics which is used for molar distalization of maxillary molars. This appliance is a removable type of appliance which was developed by Herbert I. Margolis. This appliance is intended to be worn 24 hours a day except during meals. It is one of the few removable appliances made for distalization of molars and thus requires patient compliance for the treatment to be successful.

== Components ==
- Palatal Acrylic with bite plate
- Modified Adams clasps on first premolars
- Labial bow across incisors
- Finger springs against first molars

In this appliance, the fingers springs are the main component which act against the 1st molars to move them distally. These springs apply about 100 to 125g of force to the molars after they are activated posteriorly. The original appliance developed by Margolis included helices next to the laterals and canines for a straight pull or Northwest headgear tubes to be inserted. This appliance is specifically indicated for adolescents or pre-adolescents patients who are in mixed dentition and are very compliant.

Management of appliance includes measuring overjet every appointment to measure the anchorage loss of the appliance.

== Advantages ==
- Patient friendly
- Continuous forces to the teeth
- Possible asymmetric distalization of the molars

== Disadvantages ==
- Tipping of molar teeth (instead of translation)
- Loss of anchorage where the overjet increases

== Recommendation ==
Dietz et al. recommended that to avoid tipping of molar teeth, a high pull headgear can be used in conjunction with this appliance. As the ACCO appliance will move the crown of molar distally, headgear will act to move the molar roots distally. In order to avoid loss of anchorage, they also recommended to achieve "overcorrection" of the molar distalization by 2mm or more. Anchorage loss occurs as anterior teeth move mesially, shown by 2mm increase in overjet and also 1st molars moving mesially. The authors also stated that presence of 2nd molars can exacerbate the loss of anchorage. Therefore, addition of finger springs can be added to the 2nd molars to move them distally also.

== See also ==
- List of orthodontic functional appliances
- List of palatal expanders
- Pendulum appliance
