= Elizabeth Greenleaf =

Elizabeth Greenleaf may refer to:

- Elizabeth Bristol Greenleaf (1895–1980), American collector of folk songs
- Elizabeth Gooking Greenleaf (1681–1762), American apothecary
