= Arthur Raley =

The Reverend Arthur Raley MC

Personal details
- Born: 1889 Barnsley, England
- Died: 11 June 1964 (aged 74–75) Bedford, England
- Occupation: Soldier and Priest
- Education: Bedford Modern School

The Reverend Arthur Raley MC (1889 – 11 June 1964) was a British soldier and priest. He served as an officer in the Royal Newfoundland Regiment during World War I for which he was mentioned in despatches, awarded a Military Cross and the Croix de Guerre, as captain and subsequently major of his regiment. After the war he was ordained in England and later became Chaplain to Royal Air Force Command during World War II where he held the relative rank of squadron leader and was again mentioned in despatches. Prior to World War I, Raley worked on the Grenfell Mission in Labrador, Canada.

== Life ==
Arthur Raley was born at Barnsley, England, in 1889. He was educated at Bedford Modern School where, as an accomplished cricketer, he was in the first XI in 1905 and 1906. He played in a cricket match with W. G. Grace shortly after leaving school.

Raley trained as a surveyor but gave it up and emigrated to Newfoundland, Canada, on his 21st birthday, with the ultimate aim of being ordained. He initially worked as a schoolmaster at what is now Bishop Feild College in Newfoundland before joining the Grenfell Mission and being sent to northern Labrador where he took command of a reindeer ranch organising medical supplies and assistance to remote communities.

Raley joined the Royal Canadian Mounted Police but when World War I was declared, he signed up with the Royal Newfoundland Regiment as a lieutenant on 24 September 1914. As part of the Mediterranean Expeditionary Force he saw action in Gallipoli, having landed at Suvla Bay, and was promoted captain on 28 July 1915 and adjutant on 29 September 1915.

Raley was admitted to hospital in Malta on 13 December 1915 but rejoined the regiment at Suez on 31 January 1916. His regiment was part of the British Expeditionary Force on 14 March 1916 and Raley was awarded the Military Cross on 1 January 1917. The citation for his Military Cross read:'For conspicuous gallantry and devotion to duty. He organised and gallantly led a bombing attack driving the enemy back at a critical time. He set a splendid example of courage and initiative'.

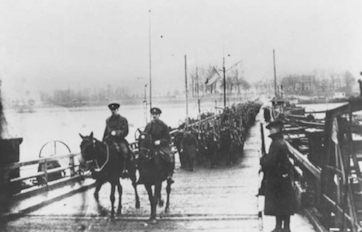
Capt. A Raley (left) leading the Royal Newfoundland Regiment across the Rhine into Germany, December 1918

Raley was wounded at Monchy-le-Preux during the Battle of Arras in April 1917 after which he returned to England to convalesce. On 23 May 1917, he was attached to the Depot, Ayr, and rejoined his regiment on 26 January 1918.

Following the Armistice, Captain Raley and Lt. Col. A.E. Bernard led the Royal Newfoundland Regiment across the Rhine into Germany on 13 December 1918. He was awarded the Croix de Guerre in 1919 and was appointed Second in Command of the 1st Battalion of his regiment in May 1919 before his return to Newfoundland.

According to Crockford's Clerical Directory, Raley returned to England and entered St Boniface Missionary College, Warminster, after which he was made Deacon of the Church of All Saints Luton where he became a Priest in 1924. For the next fifteen years he worked as a parish priest at Christ Church Luton and as Vicar of Grimethorpe (1931–49).

In 1939, Raley was made Chaplain to Royal Air Force Command during World War II where he was again mentioned in despatches and had the relative rank of squadron leader. He left his Vicarship at Grimethorpe in 1949, but remained Vicar of St Edward's Church Barnsley until 1961.

In 1960, Raley was honoured by his old school, being made president of the Old Bedford Modernians’ Club. He died in Bedford on 11 June 1964.
