= Kirkina Mucko =

Canadian Inuk nurse and midwife

- Born: Elizabeth Jeffries; 1890 near Rigolet, Labrador
- Died: 1970 (aged 79–80)
- Other names: Kirkina Mukko, Elizabeth Mukko
- Occupations: nurse, midwife
- Years active: 1918-1970
- Known for: nurse, midwifery

Kirkina Mucko also known as Elizabeth Mukko, (1890-1970) was a Canadian Inuk nurse and midwife. Having lost her legs as a child, and possibly her parents, she was raised in a series of mission homes, hospitals and boarding schools. Returning from abroad around 1908, she worked at the Grenfell Mission in Labrador. After losing family members in the 1918 flu pandemic, Mucko trained as a nurse and midwife, providing services for her community until her later years. A women's shelter in Rigolet has been named in her honor.

== Early life ==
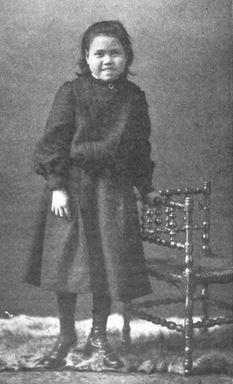
Kirkina, (Elizabeth Jeffries), circa 1903

Elizabeth Jeffries was born in 1890 on the shores of Hamilton Inlet, near Rigolet, Labrador to Adam Jeffries (another source calls the father Emo Jeffery), an Inuk-Scots trapper and his wife. As a toddler, her legs were frozen and amputated below the knee by her father with an axe. (Note: There are many versions of the story. Some claim her father went to get help when her mother was giving birth. Earliest accounts make no mention of that version. Other versions claim the father was out trapping and returned to find his wife ill and daughter frozen. In some versions, the baby died, in others, the baby and mother died and in still others, her father died two days after rescuing Elizabeth.) Later, she was taken to the Indian Harbour Hospital for surgery to create proper stumps, where Wilfred Grenfell, the mission doctor, met her when she was around four years old. (Note: In one version of the meeting of Kirkina and Grenfell, the child's father brought her aboard a boat and Grenfell then took her to the hospital.) A nurse, took Elizabeth to a temporary school at Halifax, Nova Scotia and by 1902, she was writing letters in English.

By age ten, Elizabeth was able to agilely move about on the leather pads which her father had fashioned for her. In 1900, Grenfell, who renamed her Kirkina, took her to Battle Harbour Hospital, where she remained for two years. A letter dated 9 November 1902 from Kirkina to a Massachusetts family who had sent her a doll, said her legs would be completed within a week by Dr. John McPherson, who was part of the mission staff. He fashioned temporary wooden artificial legs, which she quickly learned to use. Around 1903, Kirkina received her first pair of cork limbs from donors in Boston, Massachusetts and when Dr. McPherson and his wife left Labrador later that year, they took her with them, first to Boston and then to Mexico. Kirkina returned to New York for schooling for two years and then returned to the McPhersons in Mexico. After four years in Mexico, she returned to Newfoundland, in 1908 and initially lived with a nurse in Forteau. In 1912, Gaffney secured a new set of legs for Kirkina through donors in the U.S. Gaffney continued to use the story of Kirkina and other indigenous orphans to garner donations for his charitable works.

== Career ==
Jeffries began working at the Grenfell Mission at St. Anthony. On 20 March 1916, she married a trapper who was thirty years her senior, Adam Mucko. In the 1918 flu pandemic, she lost her husband and some of her children, (Note: Some sources state she had seven children, who she buried in the flu epidemic. Some say she lost 6 in 1918, others say she lost 3 in 1918. Ten years lapsed from her 1908 return to Canada and the 1918 pandemic, so it is possible. However, she worked for a mission service and did not marry until 1916. Impossible to reconcile the number variances with known sources.) deciding in the aftermath to study nursing and midwifery at the mission.

Mucko lived in Rigolet and offered nursing services to anyone within a 35-mile radius of her property. In 1950, having worn out her previous artificial legs, airmen from the Royal Canadian Air Force and United States Air Force stationed at Goose Bay Canadian Forces Base donated a pair of legs and sent her to St. John's, Newfoundland for the fitting. By 1961, those legs had worn out and airmen on the base again collected money to replace her limbs. She continued nursing until the end of her life, though in her later years, lived with her daughter in Happy Valley-Goose Bay. Mucko died in 1970 and posthumously, a women's shelter in Rigolet was named in her honor.
