= Frank Houghton (admiral) =

Canadian naval officer

Rear-Admiral Frank Llewellyn Houghton, CBE (1897, in Cornwall – 3 August 1981, in Ottawa) was a flag officer in the Royal Canadian Navy.

Born in Cornwall, England, and educated in Victoria, British Columbia and Halifax, Nova Scotia, Houghton joined the navy in 1913 as an officer cadet. In 1945 Houghton, by then a captain, was appointed to replace Percy W. Nelles as chief of the Canadian navy's mission to Britain. In 1946 Houghton took command of Canada's first aircraft carrier, Warrior, and by 1947 he was serving as vice-chief of the Naval Staff.

After his retirement as rear admiral, Houghton joined the International Grenfell Association, serving as business manager.
