= Matthew H. Liang =

American professor of medicine

- Born: May 24, 1944 (age 82); Santa Monica, California
- Citizenship: U.S.A.
- Education: Baltimore Polytechnic Institute
- Alma mater: Johns Hopkins University; Dartmouth Medical School; Harvard Medical School; Harvard School of Public Health
- Occupation: Physician

Matthew H. Liang is a physician specializing in general internal medicine and rheumatology, Professor of Medicine at Harvard Medical School, Professor of Health Policy and Management at Harvard School of Public Health, and the Director Emeritus of Special Projects of the Robert B. Brigham Arthritis and Musculoskeletal Diseases Clinical Research Center which he founded. He is a founding faculty of the Division of General Internal Medicine and Primary Care at the Brigham and Women's Hospital and a founding faculty of the Clinical Effectiveness Program at the Harvard School of Public Health and is a Study Director in the Veterans Administration Cooperative Studies Program.

== Early life ==
Liang's family fled Guangzhou, China in 1949. A relative of Liang Qichao and Liang Sicheng, his grandfather originally migrated from a farming village in Xinhui District in the province of Guangdong. His father, Ping Yee Liang, graduated from the first western-styled medical school, the Rockefeller-funded Peking Union Medical College. His mother, Alice Kao, attended NYU Nursing School, and became head nurse in the newborn nursery at Johns Hopkins Hospital where she met Ping Yee. The family returned to China, but then fled to Macau and then to Hong Kong, eventually settling in the United States. He attended public schools and the Baltimore Polytechnic Institute, leaving before graduation to go to Johns Hopkins University.

== Education ==
After Johns Hopkins, he went to Dartmouth Medical School and Harvard Medical School, where he earned his MD in 1969. After house staff training at the University of Minnesota and a locum in the Grenfell Mission, he studied tropical public health and epidemiology at the Harvard School of Public Health, earning a MPH in 1972. Afterwards, on the Harvard Medical Service at the Boston City Hospital with the encouragement of Dr. Charles Davidson, he spent part of his residency as the founding internist of a neighborhood health center in Roxbury and worked with Roger Mark, a champion for inner city patients. Mark and Liang developed a Nursing Home Telemedicine system for over 400 residents of five nursing homes and showed that nurse practitioners could provide effective, economic care.

== Career ==
Major Liang served in the US Army Medical Corps. He implemented the Army's algorithm-based physician extender program (AMOSIST), and the first training program in general internal medicine and a chronic disease nurse practitioner program at Walter Reed Hospital. He also helped design the computerized hospital information system. After the service, he was a Robert Wood Johnson Clinical Scholar and a rheumatology fellow with Halsted Holman at Stanford.

In 1977 Liang was recruited to build a new NIH Multipurpose Arthritis Center program at the Robert Brigham Hospital and as a founding member of the new Division of Primary Care and General Medicine at the Peter Bent Brigham by K. Frank Austen, H. R. Nesson and Eugene Braunwald. The center became focused on population-based research and pursued several lines of etiologic and methodologic research.

In the 80s, Liang and Martin Larson, Lawren Daltroy, and Bob Lew were asked to take responsibility for clinical research training in arthritis and musculoskeletal diseases. The program and others like it became a model for the National Institutes of Health pathway for clinician scientists.

== Sources ==
1. "Lee C. Howley Sr. Prize for Arthritis Research" (PDF). Arthritis Foundation. 2015.
2. Bashshur, R L; Armstrong, P A (1976). "Telemedicine: A New Mode for the Delivery of Health Care". Inquiry. 13 (September 1976). Sage Publications: 233–244. JSTOR 29771011. PMID 135730.
3. Brigham and Women's Hospital (2014). "Liang Lab Home". Archived from the original on 10 September 2015.
4. Liu Chang, Union Medical College building a century: science and humanity. Sanlian Life Weekly 40: 82-94, 2017.
5. Finland, Maxwell; Castle, William B (1983). The Harvard Medical Unit at Boston City Hospital: (2 v.). Vol. 2. UP Virginia. ISBN 978-0813910000.
6. Henkel, Gretchen (October 2009). "Another Vocabulary for Rheumatology Research". The Rheumatologist. 3 (10): 40–42.
7. Liang, M H; Cello, J P; Modlin, R K (1976). "Teaching of Primary Care in an Internal Medicine Residency Program". Arch Intern Med. 136 (8): 893–896. doi:10.1001/archinte.1976.03630080035012. PMID 949190.
8. Liang, M H; Goldberg, H I; Shoor, S; Lorig, K, eds. (2002). "A Festschrift in Honor of Halsted R. Holman MD: Action Research in Health Care". Med Care. 40 (II): 1–51.
9. Liang, Matthew H; Robertson, Nancy A; Conway, Ann; Gall, Victoria; Wandel, Jane C (2013). History of the Robert Breck Brigham Hospital for Incurables: The first teaching hospital in America specializing in rheumatic and orthopedic conditions. The Brigham and Women's Hospital Inc.
10. New York Times, Gina Kolata (1991-07-11). "Pain Pills Found Effective in Arthritis". The New York Times. Archived from the original on 20 May 2017.
11. "Matthew H Liang (Brigham and Women's Hospital, Boston) on ResearchGate - Expertise: Clinical Trials, Epidemiology, Internal Medicine (General Medicine)". Researchgate.net. 2017.
12. Vickery, D M; Liang, M H; Collis, P B; Larsen, K T; Morgan, T W; Folland, E D; Mummert, J V (1975). "Physician Extenders in Walk-In Clinics – A Prospective Evaluation of the AMOSIST Program". Arch Intern Med. 135 (5): 720–725. doi:10.1001/archinte.1975.00330050094016. PMID 28706.
