= Lawrence Millman =

American travel writer (born 1946)

Lawrence Millman (born January 13, 1946, in Kansas City, Missouri) is an adventure travel writer and mycologist based in Cambridge, Massachusetts.

He has won numerous awards, including a Northern Lights Award, a Lowell Thomas Award, an award for the best article on Canada in a U.K. publication (1996), and a Pacific- Asia Gold Travel Award; he has been anthologized in the Best American Travel Writing (Houghton Mifflin) three years in a row. He is fellow of the prestigious Explorers Club, who subsequently resigned from the club,

== Early life and education ==
Millman developed an early interest in the natural world during childhood, engaging in outdoor exploration and observation. A formative experience occurred during a visit to Walden Pond, associated with the work of Henry David Thoreau, which contributed to his interest in natural history. He later pursued academic studies in literature and earned a Ph.D. from Rutgers University.

== Career ==
Millman began his professional career as a professor of English, but later shifted away from academia to pursue independent research and writing. He undertook ethnographic fieldwork in Ireland, where he documented oral storytelling traditions in his first ethnographic book, Our Like Will Not Be There Again, which examines the decline of oral culture in the context of modern media.

His subsequent research took him to Arctic regions, where he developed an interest in ethnomycology the relationship between human cultures and fungi. His work has documented Indigenous knowledge systems, including the medicinal and cultural uses of fungi.

== Works ==
=== Scholarly works ===
He is the author of eighteen books, including Goodbye, Ice: Arctic Poems, Fungipedia, Our Like Will Not Be There Again, Northern Latitudes, Last Places, An Evening Among Headhunters, A Kayak Full of Ghosts, Lost in the Arctic, and Fascinating Fungi of New England. His work has also appeared in Smithsonian, National Geographic Adventure, the Atlantic Monthly, Sports Illustrated.

He has discovered a previously unknown lake in Borneo, and there is a mountain named after him outside Tasiilaq in eastern Greenland.

Millman was close friends with the outdoor writer Elliott Merrick (1905-1997).
