= Molar distalization =

Orthodontic procedure

Molar distalization is a process in the field of orthodontics which is used to move molar teeth, especially permanent first molars, distally (backwards) in an arch. This procedure is often used in treatment of patients who have Class 2 malocclusion. The cause is often the result of loss of E space in an arch due to early loss of primary molar teeth and mesial (forward) migration of the molar teeth. Sometimes molars are distalized to make space for other impacted teeth, such as premolars or canines, in the mouth.

Distalization in the maxillary arch is easier than the mandibular arch because maxillary bone has more trabecular bone than the mandible, which has higher percentage of cortical bone. One of the most popular devices that is used to distalize molars is known as Pendulum appliance and Pendex Appliance. These were developed by Hilgers in 1990.

== Eruption of second molar ==
It has been reported in the literature that eruption stage of second molar has an impact on the distalization of the first permanent molar. Tipping movement occurs where the first molars are angled backwards when the second molar has not erupted yet. In addition, the treatment duration for distalization of first molars increases if the second molar has already erupted. Therefore, distalization of first molars is recommended prior to eruption of the second molars. Although, there are some studies that do report that there is no connection between eruption stages of second molar and duration of treatment to the distalization of the 1st molars.

Finally in 2013, a systematic review was published by Flores-Mir et al. which looked at efficiency of molar distalization associated with second and third molar eruption stage. The authors concluded that the effect of maxillary second and third molar eruption stage on molar distalization in both the horizontal and angular distalization appeared to be minimal. This systematic review looked at four studies where one study stated that amount of distal movement of maxillary first molar was greater (3mm vs 2mm) and that treatment time was shorter (5.2months vs 6 months) in patients with unerupted second molar vs patients with erupted second molar. However, out of the 4 studies reviewed, this was the only study which favored more distalization with unerupted molars, as others did not agree. The study did have some limitations such as different type of appliances used in different papers and different landmarks used in the evaluation of cephalometric radiograph.

== Indications ==
- End-on molar relationship
- Mesially angulated upper molars
- Late mixed dentition patient
- Mild to moderate crowding
- Impacted canine or premolar
- Second molars not yet erupted
- Missing third molars preferably

A careful approach must be undertaken in patients with severe space discrepancy and hyperdivergent growth pattern for the procedure of molar distalization. Ideally, the patients should have well-developed nose and chin.

== Distalization with headgears ==
Norman William Kingsley was the first person to try to move the maxillary teeth backwards in 1892 by means of headgear. Albin Oppenheim later advocated for the use of occipital anchorage to move the maxillary teeth backwards. Earlier into the field of orthodontics, molar teeth would be distalized with the use of headgears. Straight Pull (Combination) Headgear for translation of molar distally, Cervical Pull Headgear for extrusive and distalization of teeth in deep bite Class 2 patients and High Pull Headgear for intrusive and distalization of teeth in an open bite patient.

== See also ==
- Intrusion (orthodontics)
