= Ada Margaret Brayton =

American astronomer (1885–1975)

Ada Margaret Brayton (December 27, 1885 – January 1975) was a life member of the American Astronomical Society, and co-author of the monumental book, Spectroscopic Absolute Magnitudes and Distances of 4719 Stars that increased the number of stars of known distance one hundred-fold.

== Early life ==
Ada Margaret Brayton was born on December 27, 1885, in Nebraska, to Franklin B. Brayton and Grace Treloar.

== Career ==
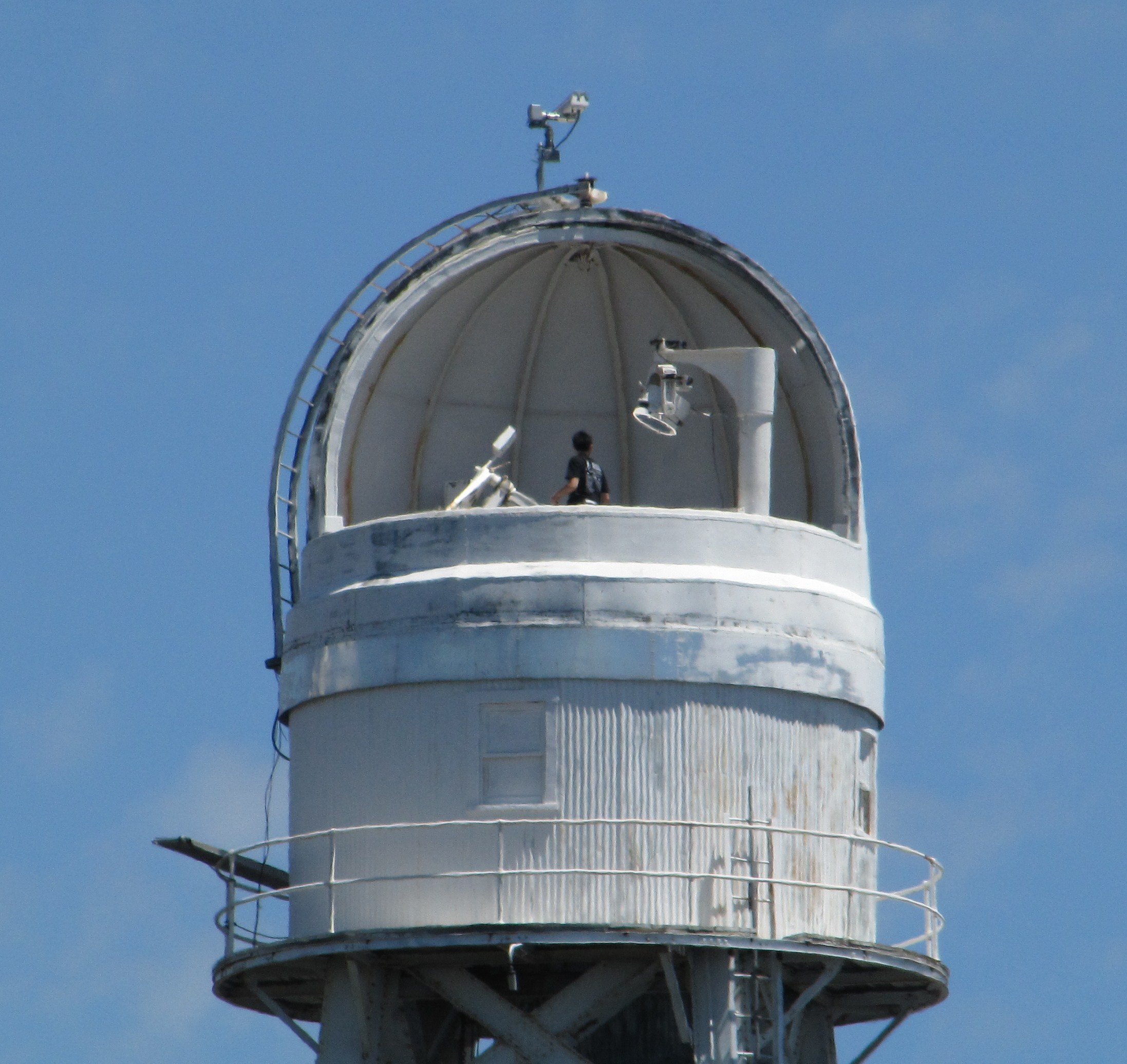
The top of the 150-Foot Solar Tower Observatory on Mt. Wilson

She was a member of the staff of Mount Wilson Observatory, the Astronomical Computer Department of stellar spectroscopy. She was a life member of the American Astronomical Society and member of the Archaeological Society of New Mexico. In 1920, she found that the radial velocity of the star Boss 3644 was variable thanks to her measures of three spectrograms made with the 60-inch reflector and single prism spectrograph. In 1935, Brayton, together with Walter Sydney Adams, Alfred H. Joy (1882–1973), and Milton La Salle Humason (1891–1972), published a monumental book, Spectroscopic Absolute Magnitudes and Distances of 4719 Stars that increased the number of stars of known distance by one hundred-fold.

She was an accredited teacher, translator and interpreter of Spanish.

She was the first vice-president of California Federation of Business & Professional Women's Clubs and president of Pasadena Business and Professional Women's Club from 1928 to 1929.

She was the president of the Pasadena Chapter of the Grenfell Association of America.

She was a member of the Lucretia Garfield Circle and the Ladies of G. A. R.

== Personal and later life ==
She lived in Pasadena, California, with her brother, Wilbur Newman Brayton (died 1940), a veteran of World War I.

In 1924, The Ada Margaret Brayton Endowment Fund of $20,000.00 ($279,112.14 in 2017) was established to be used for the best interest of the California Federation of Business and Professional Women's Clubs, Inc. She died in January 1975, aged 89.
