= Elliott Merrick =

American writer

Elliott Merrick ca. 1948

Elliott Merrick (May 11, 1905 – April 22, 1997) was an American writer best known for his memoirs about Labrador. He was also an editor, teacher, farmer and sailor. In addition he wrote for magazines, including The New Yorker and Reader's Digest.

Elliott Tucker Merrick III was born into an affluent family in Montclair, New Jersey, and graduated from Phillips Exeter Academy and Yale University. He worked at his father's firm, The National Lead Company, for a year before deciding he wanted a more outdoor-oriented life. He took a job as a teacher at the remote Grenfell Mission (a medical missionary station) at Indian Harbour, Labrador. He then transferred tonearby North West River where he met his soon to be wife, Kate, a nurse from Australia. He wrote about his time there in Frost and Fire (1939). He penned Kate's memoir, based on her memories of Labrador, titled Northern Nurse (1942). The book was quite successful spending time on The New York Times Bestseller List.

His first book True North (1933), is a diary about living in Goose Bay, Labrador. He wrote a memoir Green Mountain Farm (1948) about farm life in northern Vermont, where he lived with his wife and children during the depression of the 1930s.

He taught English at the University of Vermont. He was an editor for the Office of War Information and worked with the merchant marine during World War II. These experiences informed his book Passing By (1947). He was later employed by the United States Forest Service in Asheville, North Carolina for 22 years, working as a science editor and publications officer. After retirement he spent time with his wife sailing, from which was published posthumously Cruising at Last: Sailing the East Coast (2003).

During the last years of his life Merrick was close friend with the outdoor writer Lawrence Millman, who wrote a short biographical remembrance in 2020. He said Merrick "looked to Thoreau for guidance", and Walden was his "bible". Merrick once said, "Nature, love it or leave it, is all we've got."

== Works ==
Fiction

- From This Hill Look Down (1934)
- Ever the Wind Blows (1936)
- Frost and Fire (1939)
- Passing By (1947)
- The Long Crossing and Other Labrador Stories (1992)

Nonfiction

- True North (1933)
- Northern Nurse (1942)
- Green Mountain Farm (1948)
- Cruising at Last: Sailing the East Coast (2003)
