= Indian Harbour, Newfoundland and Labrador =

Indian Harbour
- Location of Indian Harbour in Newfoundland and Labrador
- Coordinates: 54.4727°N 57.185835°W
- Country: Canada
- Province: Newfoundland and Labrador

Indian Harbour is a former settlement in Newfoundland and Labrador.

In 1894, Wilfred Grenfell, medical missionary, founded a cottage hospital there, staffed by two doctors and two nurses.

== Background ==
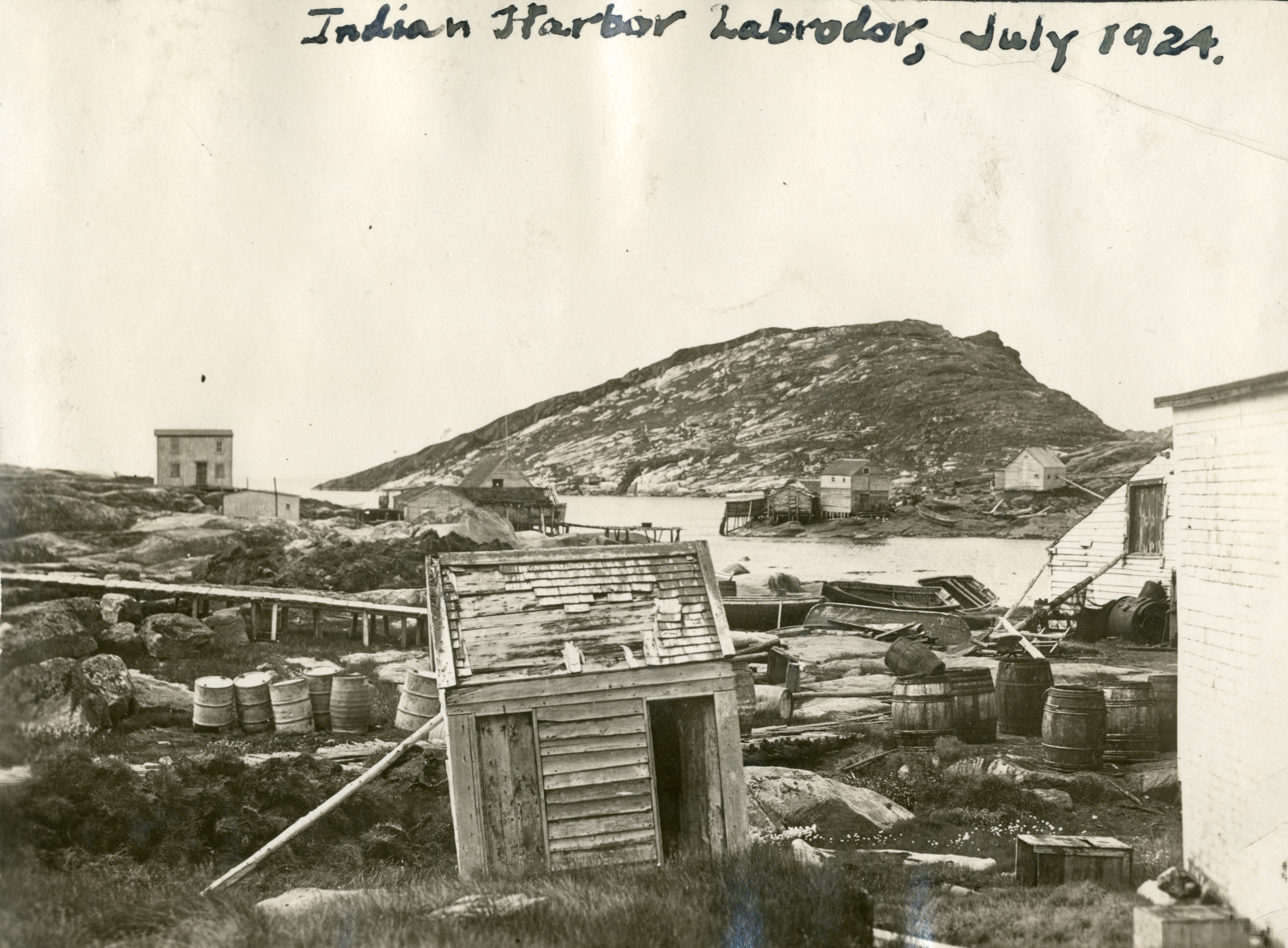
Indian Harbor, July 1924

In 1912 Harry Paddon and Mina Gilchrist arrived as doctor and nurse. They provided medical services to the Newfoundland fishing fleets as well as the local population. In the fall they sailed 150 miles west to Mud Lake and established a medical outpost in an abandoned lumber camp, returning to Indian Harbour in the spring. In 1915 they established a hospital at North West River and began a seasonal migration that lasted 20 years. Harry and Mina married in 1913 and had four sons.

In the late 1920s and early 30s, Australian nurse Kate Merrick worked at the Grenfell Mission. She later wrote a memoir about her time at Indian Harbour titled Northern Nurse (1942); in fact, the memoir was written by her husband the author Elliott Merrick, and was based on her memories. The book was well received spending 17 weeks on The New York Times bestseller list.

== Notable inhabitants ==
- Wilfred Grenfell, medical missionary
- Kirkina Mucko, nurse and midwife
- Harry Paddon, doctor
- Mina Paddon, nurse
