= CCGS Cape Roger =

Canadian Coast Guard patrol vessel

History

Canada
- Name: Cape Roger
- Namesake: Cape Roger
- Owner: Government of Canada
- Operator: Canadian Coast Guard
- Port of registry: Ottawa, Ontario
- Builder: Ferguson Industries Ltd., Pictou
- Yard number: 201
- Launched: 12 June 1976
- Commissioned: August 1977
- In service: 1977–present
- Refit: 1996
- Home port: CCG Base St. John's
- Identification: VCBT; IMO number: 7503180
- Status: in active service

General characteristics
- Class & type: Cape Roger-class fisheries patrol vessel
- Tonnage: 1,255 GT; 357 NT
- Displacement: 1,465 long tons (1,489 t) full load
- Length: 62.5 m (205 ft 1 in)
- Beam: 12.1 m (39 ft 8 in)
- Draught: 5.3 m (17 ft 5 in)
- Installed power: 3,278 kW (4,396 bhp)
- Propulsion: 2 × Polar Nohab 12-cylinder diesel engines
- Speed: 18 knots (33 km/h; 21 mph)
- Range: 10,000 nmi (19,000 km; 12,000 mi) at 12 knots (22 km/h; 14 mph)
- Endurance: 31 days
- Complement: 19
- Armament: 2 × 12.7 mm (0.5 in) machine guns

CCGS Cape Roger (Note: CCGS stands for Canadian Coast Guard Ship) is the lead ship of the Cape Roger-class fisheries patrol vessels operated by the Canadian Coast Guard. The ship entered service in 1977 and was assigned to monitor the Atlantic fisheries. During the Turbot War, Cape Roger took part in the detainment of the Spanish fishing trawler Estai. The ship is currently in service.

== Design and description ==
Cape Roger is 62.5 metres (205 ft 1 in) long overall with a beam of 12.1 m (39 ft 8 in) and a draught of 5.3 m (17 ft 5 in). The ship has a fully loaded displacement of 1,465 long tons (1,489 t), a gross tonnage (GT) of 1,255 and a 357 net tonnage (NT). The ship is propelled by two Polar Nohab F212V 12-cylinder geared diesel engines driving one controllable pitch propeller and bow thrusters creating 3,278 kilowatts (4,396 hp). This gives the vessel a maximum speed of 18 knots (33 km/h; 21 mph). Cape Roger carries 398.00 m^{3} (87,550 imp gal) of diesel fuel giving the vessel a range of 10,000 nautical miles (19,000 km; 12,000 mi) at 12 knots (22 km/h; 14 mph) and can stay at sea for up to 31 days.

The ship was equipped with a flight deck located over the stern of the vessel and was capable of landing operations for one light helicopter. Cape Roger was initially fitted with a hangar. In 2011, the hangar was removed and replaced with a workshop and the flight deck was modified and is capable only of helicopter hoisting. The patrol vessel is armed with two 12.7 mm (0.5 in) machine guns. The ship has a complement of 19, with 8 officers and 11 crew. The vessel has 23 spare berths.

== Construction and career ==
The vessel was built at Ferguson Industries Ltd., Pictou, Nova Scotia with the yard number 201 and launched on 12 June 1976. Named for a cape on the western side of Placentia Bay on the island of Newfoundland, the ship was commissioned into the Canadian Coast Guard in August 1977. Cape Roger is registered in Ottawa, Ontario, but is homeported at CCG Base St. John's in St. John's, Newfoundland and Labrador. The ship is used to monitor the Atlantic Canada fisheries, primarily those on the Grand Banks of Newfoundland.

In 1993, Cape Roger and CCGS Sir Wilfred Grenfell were sent to track the Sea Shepherd vessel Cleveland Amory, which had chased the Cuban fishing trawler Rio Las Casas from the Grand Banks. With Royal Canadian Mounted Police (RCMP) officers embarked, Cape Roger boarded Cleveland Amory and detained the ship. Paul Watson was forced to sell Cleveland Amory to pay the fines for the incident. In June 1994, Cape Roger was among the Coast Guard vessels sent to monitor the European fishing fleet on the Grand Banks after Canada claimed jurisdiction over the fishing in the area in what became known as the Turbot War. On 9 March 1995, the Coast Guard sent several vessels to detain the Spanish fishing trawler Estai. Cape Roger was given the job of closing with Estai and allowing the RCMP and Department of Fisheries and Oceans personnel to board the fishing trawler. The operation was successful and Estai was detained. The patrol vessel underwent a mid-life modernization at Shelburne Marine, Shelburne in 1996. On 3 October 1997, the small freighter Vanessa sent a distress signal which two merchants responded to, recovering nine survivors the next day. Cape Roger arrived on scene and recovered four bodies and one more survivor.

In 2011 Cape Roger underwent a $12 million refit. During this refit the flight deck and hangar were modified. In September 2016, Cape Roger took part in the search for survivors of the Pop's Pride fishing trawler sinking off the coast of Newfoundland. In December 2018, Cape Roger, along with HMCS Glace Bay, HMCS Summerside, a CH-149 Cormorant helicopter and a United States Coast Guard took part in the rescue of four crew of the 15 m (49 ft 3 in) sailboat Makena which had been disabled 240 nautical miles (440 km; 280 mi) south of Newfoundland.
