= International Grenfell Association =

Canadian medical organization

The International Grenfell Association (IGA) was an organization founded by Sir Wilfred Grenfell to provide health care, education, religious services, and rehabilitation and other social activities to the fisherman and coastal communities in northern Newfoundland and the coast of Labrador. It was originally a branch of the Royal National Mission to Deep Sea Fishermen and was widely known as the Grenfell Mission.

Before 1892 there were no medical facilities or personnel along the coast of Labrador aside from a Moravian Mission that provided basic medical care and an occasional doctor that the Newfoundland government sent on a mail ship. Grenfell undertook a medical expedition in 1892 on the hospital ship the Albert. He saw medical and living conditions that appalled him, including settlements that had been wiped out by diphtheria. In response, he developed a network of regional hospitals and nursing stations. The first hospitals were built at Battle Harbour in 1893 and Indian Harbour in 1894. By the 1960s, the network had extended into the interior of Labrador.

The IGA was incorporated in the Dominion of Newfoundland on January 10, 1914, under the Companies Act of 1899.

In 2017, Canadian Prime Minister Justin Trudeau apologized for the treatment of children who, between 1949 and 1979, were separated from their families and sent to boarding schools run by the IGA.

== See also ==
- Grenfell Mission
