= Elizabeth Burchill =

Australian nurse, philanthropist and author

Dora Elizabeth Burchill OAM (4 January 1904 – 3 December 2003) was an Australian nurse, philanthropist and author.

== Life ==
She was the youngest child of Athelstane Chase Burchill ( – 3 June 1942) and his wife Rosina née Sherrin ( – 18 August 1949) of Camberwell, Victoria.

Sister Burchill trained as a nurse in Homeopathic and Women's Hospitals in Melbourne and joined the nursing service of the Australian Inland Mission, and in 1930 started at the Innamincka Nursing Home, where she worked with the fledgling Flying Doctor Service. In 1932, she left for the Royal Hospital for Women and Children in London to gain further qualifications and later joined a British medical unit which was caring for children at Almeria displaced by the Spanish Civil War. In 1937, she joined Wilfred Grenfell's mission on the coast of Labrador.

At the outbreak of the Second World War, Sister Burchill enlisted in the Australian Army Nursing Service, serving as Captain from March 1943 with the 2nd AIF in Egypt and Palestine.

After her discharge in 1946, she worked as announcer with station 3SR, Shepparton, Victoria, where she formed the "Friendship Club", then in 1952 took charge of the Child Welfare Clinic in Darwin, Northern Territory, followed by a brief stint as a Plunket nurse in New Zealand. She served as Sister in Charge of the Child Welfare Clinic on Thursday Island, then from 1961 to 1963 with the New Guinea health service.

== Family ==
On 21 January 1948, she married Sidney Raymond Reid Smith.

In November 1956, she was engaged to Eric Cook-Buchanan.

In 1983 her married name was Shalless.

== Selected works ==
- Labrador Memories Shepparton News Publishing Co, Shepparton, Victoria (1947)
- Innamincka Rigby Hodder & Stoughton Ltd. (1960)
- New Guinea Nurse (1962)
- Thursday Island Nurse (1972)
- The Paths I've Trod (1981)
- Australian Nurses Since Nightingale 1860–1990 (1992)

== Awards and honors ==
- On 8 June 1998, Sister Elizabeth Burchill was awarded the Medal of the Order of Australia (OAM) for service to nursing, particularly as an historian, author and philanthropist.
- Bread and Cheese Club's Jessie Litchfield Annual Award
- Veterans' Affairs Writers Award
