= HMS Warrior (R31) =

1946 Colossus-class aircraft carrier

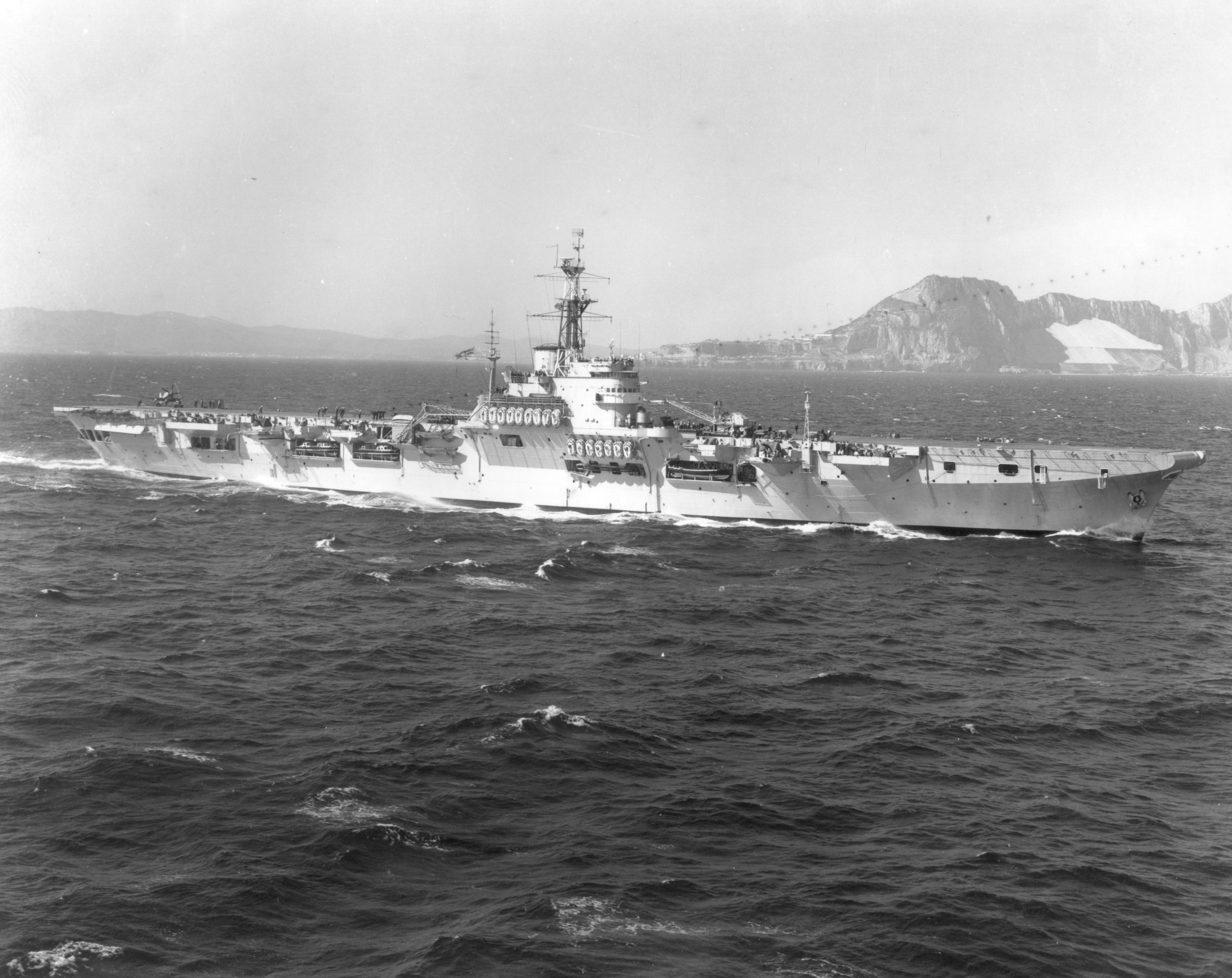
- HMS Warrior near Gibraltar

History

United Kingdom
- Name: HMS Warrior
- Builder: Harland and Wolff
- Laid down: 12 December 1942
- Launched: 20 May 1944
- Commissioned: 2 April 1945
- Identification: Pennant number: R31
- Fate: Transferred to the Royal Canadian Navy

Canada
- Name: HMCS Warrior
- Commissioned: 14 March 1946
- Decommissioned: 23 March 1948
- Motto: "Haul together"
- Fate: Returned to Royal Navy
- Badge: Azure, the head and shoulders of a Viking proper wearing the typical Viking helmet argent, wings or, coat of mail argent trimmed or

United Kingdom
- Name: HMS Warrior
- Commissioned: November 1948
- Decommissioned: February 1958
- Fate: Sold to Argentina in 1958

Argentina
- Name: ARA Independencia
- Commissioned: 8 July 1959
- Decommissioned: 1970
- Identification: Pennant number: V-1
- Fate: Scrapped in Argentina in 1971

General characteristics as built
- Class & type: Colossus-class aircraft carrier
- Displacement: 18,300 long tons (18,600 t)
- Length: 630 ft 0 in (192.0 m) pp; 695 ft 0 in (211.8 m) oa
- Beam: 80 ft 0 in (24.4 m)
- Draught: 23 ft 3 in (7.1 m)
- Propulsion: 4 × Admiralty 3-drum type boilers; 2 × screw; 2 × Parsons geared turbines; 40,000 shp (30 MW)
- Speed: 25 knots (46 km/h)
- Range: 12,000 nmi (22,224 km) at 14 kn (26 km/h)
- Complement: 1,300 (max)
- Armament: 4 × twin 40 mm Bofors guns; 20 × single 40 mm Bofors guns

HMS Warrior was a Colossus-class light aircraft carrier which was ordered in 1942 by the British Royal Navy during World War II. Construction was finished in 1945 and upon completion, the aircraft carrier was loaned to the Royal Canadian Navy from 1946 to 1948 as HMCS Warrior. Warrior was returned to the Royal Navy in 1948 and entered service with the British. While in service with the Royal Navy, Warrior was modernised twice, including the installation of an angled flight deck in 1956. In 1948–1949, the ship was used in aircraft landing experiments and fitted with a rubber flight deck and in 1957, was used as the headquarters ship during nuclear testing at Christmas Island. In 1958, the vessel was sold to the Argentine Navy and entered Argentine service in 1959 as ARA Independencia. The aircraft carrier remained in service until 1970 when Independencia was placed in reserve. The following year, the ship was sold for scrap.

== Description ==
Warrior was a Colossus-class light aircraft carrier that was 630 feet 0 inches (192.0 m) long between perpendiculars and 695 feet 0 inches (211.8 m) overall with a beam at the waterline of 80 feet 0 inches (24.4 m) and an overall width of 112 feet 6 inches (34.3 m). The ship had a mean draught of 23 feet 3 inches (7.1 m). Warrior had a standard displacement of 13,350 long tons (13,560 t) when built and a full load displacement of 18,300 long tons (18,600 t). The aircraft carrier had a flight deck 690 feet 0 inches (210.3 m) long that was 80 feet 0 inches (24.4 m) wide and was 39 feet 0 inches (11.9 m) above the water. The flight deck tapered to 45 feet (14 m) at the bow. For takeoffs, the flight deck was equipped with one BH 3 aircraft catapult capable of launching 16,000-pound (7,257 kg) aircraft at 66 knots (122 km/h). For landings, the ship was fitted with 10 arrestor wires capable of stopping a 15,000-pound (6,804 kg) aircraft, with two safety barriers rated at stopping a 15,000-pound aircraft at 40 knots (74 km/h) Warrior had two aircraft lifts located along the centreline of the ship that were 45 by 34 feet (13.7 by 10.4 m) and could handle aircraft up to 15,000 pounds on a 36-second cycle. The aircraft hangar was 275 by 52 feet (83.8 by 15.8 m) with a further 57 by 52 feet (17.4 by 15.8 m) section beyond the aft elevator, all with a clearance of 17 feet 6 inches (5.3 m). The hangar was divided into four sections by asbestos fire curtains. The hangar was fully enclosed and could only be entered by air locks and the lifts, due to the hazardous nature of aviation fuel and oil vapours. The vessel had stowage for 98,600 imperial gallons (448,244 L; 118,414 US gal) of aviation fuel.

The ship was powered by steam created by four Admiralty 3-drum type boilers driving two Parsons geared turbines, each turning one shaft. The machinery was split into two spaces, each containing two boilers and one turbine, separated by 24-foot (7.3 m) spaces containing aviation fuel. The spaces were situated en echelon within the ship to prevent a single disabling torpedo strike. The engines were rated at 42,000 shaft horsepower (31,319 kW) and the vessel had a capacity for 3,196 long tons (3,247 t) of fuel oil, with a range of 8,300 nautical miles (15,372 km) at 20 knots (37 km/h). The ship's maximum speed was 25 knots (46 km/h). There was no armour aboard the vessel save for mantlets around the torpedo storage area. There were no longitudinal bulkheads, but the transverse bulkheads were designed to allow the ship to survive two complete sections of the ship being flooded.

Warrior was designed to handle up to 42 aircraft. The aircraft carrier carried a wide range of ordnance for their aircraft from torpedoes, depth charges, bombs, 20 mm cannon ammunition and flares. For anti-aircraft defence, the aircraft carrier was initially armed with four twin-mounted and twenty single-mounted 40 mm Bofors guns. The original radar installation included the Type 79 and Type 281 long-range air search radars, the Type 293 and Type 277 fighter direction radar and the "YE" aircraft homing beacon. The ship had a maximum ship's company of 1,300, which was reduced in peacetime.

== Construction and career ==
The contract to construct Warrior was placed on 7 August 1942. Warrior was built by Harland and Wolff at their yard in Belfast and given the yard number 1224, originally to be called Brave. Before construction began, once-innovative armoured frigate (at the time just a floating oil jetty) HMS Warrior was renamed to Oil Fuel Hulk C77 in August 1942 to free up her name, and the carrier was renamed to Warrior. Her keel was laid down on 12 December 1942, she was launched on 20 May 1944 and became the last of the Colossus class to finish construction. The Royal Navy had originally intended to rush Warrior into service for operations in the Indian Ocean during the Second World War, thus she was built without heaters for some onboard equipment since heat was unnecessary in tropical operations.

=== Royal Canadian Navy service ===
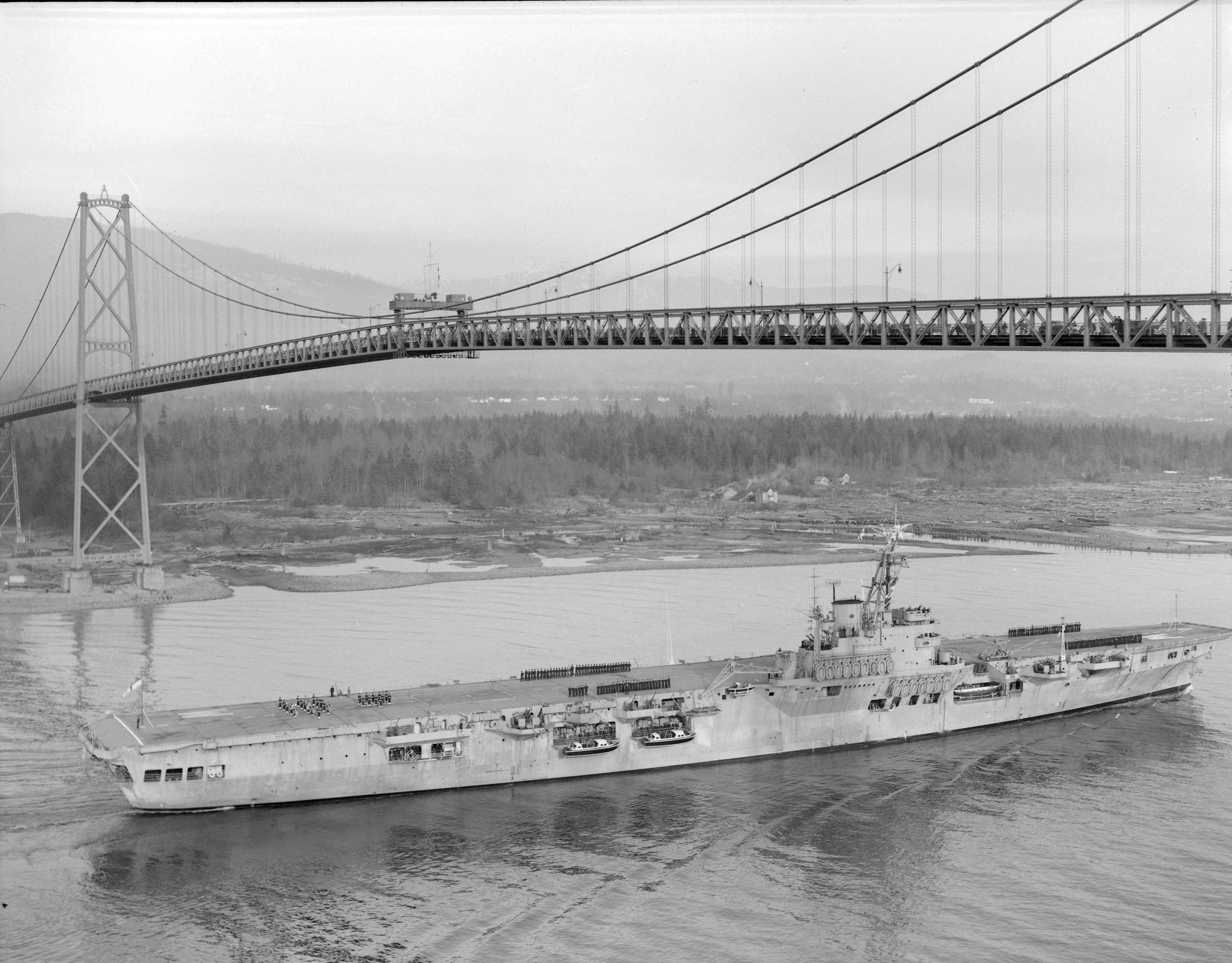
HMCS Warrior passing under the Lions Gate Bridge, 1947

As the focus of future operations at sea during the Second World War shifted to the Pacific theatre, planning began in May 1944 that the Royal Canadian Navy (RCN) would require a larger fleet both in numbers and in size of ships. In the effort to get bigger, the RCN returned the escort carriers then on loan, Puncher and Nabob, in exchange for the loan of two light fleet carriers. A formal approach was first made in July, with negotiations being finalised in April 1945 when Warrior and Magnificent were acquired on loan with the option to purchase them outright at a later date. Negotiations were completed in May for the naval air squadrons that would be needed to man the aircraft carrier, but the war ended before the ships were completed.

After the agreement with Canada went through, Canadian naval aviation was established with the formation of four squadrons transferred from the Fleet Air Arm intended to fly from Warrior; 803 Squadron and 883 Squadron equipped with Supermarine Seafires and 825 Squadron and 826 Squadron with Fairey Fireflys. Warrior was completed, transferred to the RCN and commissioned as HMCS Warrior on 24 January 1946 and placed under the command of Captain Frank Houghton. Sea trials were completed in March and flying trials were performed at Spithead following that. For the voyage to Canada, 803 and 825 Squadrons were embarked, while 883 and 826 Squadrons were paid off.

Warrior entered Halifax harbour on 31 March 1946, a week after leaving Portsmouth. She was escorted by the destroyer HMCS Micmac and the minesweeper HMCS Middlesex, having officially joined the Canadian Atlantic Fleet on 23 March. April through May was spent alongside fixing builder's defects before the ship began major fleet operations. In August, the aircraft carrier had its first loss, when a Firefly from 825 Squadron ditched, though both the pilot and observer were recovered. That same month, on 23 August while transiting the St. Lawrence River, Warrior ran aground at Pointe Sainte Antoine, near Montreal while en route to the city after her rudder jammed. Tugboats got the aircraft carrier unstuck from the mud bank she had run into the same day and Warrior continued on to Montreal where she became the largest ship to visit that port to that date.

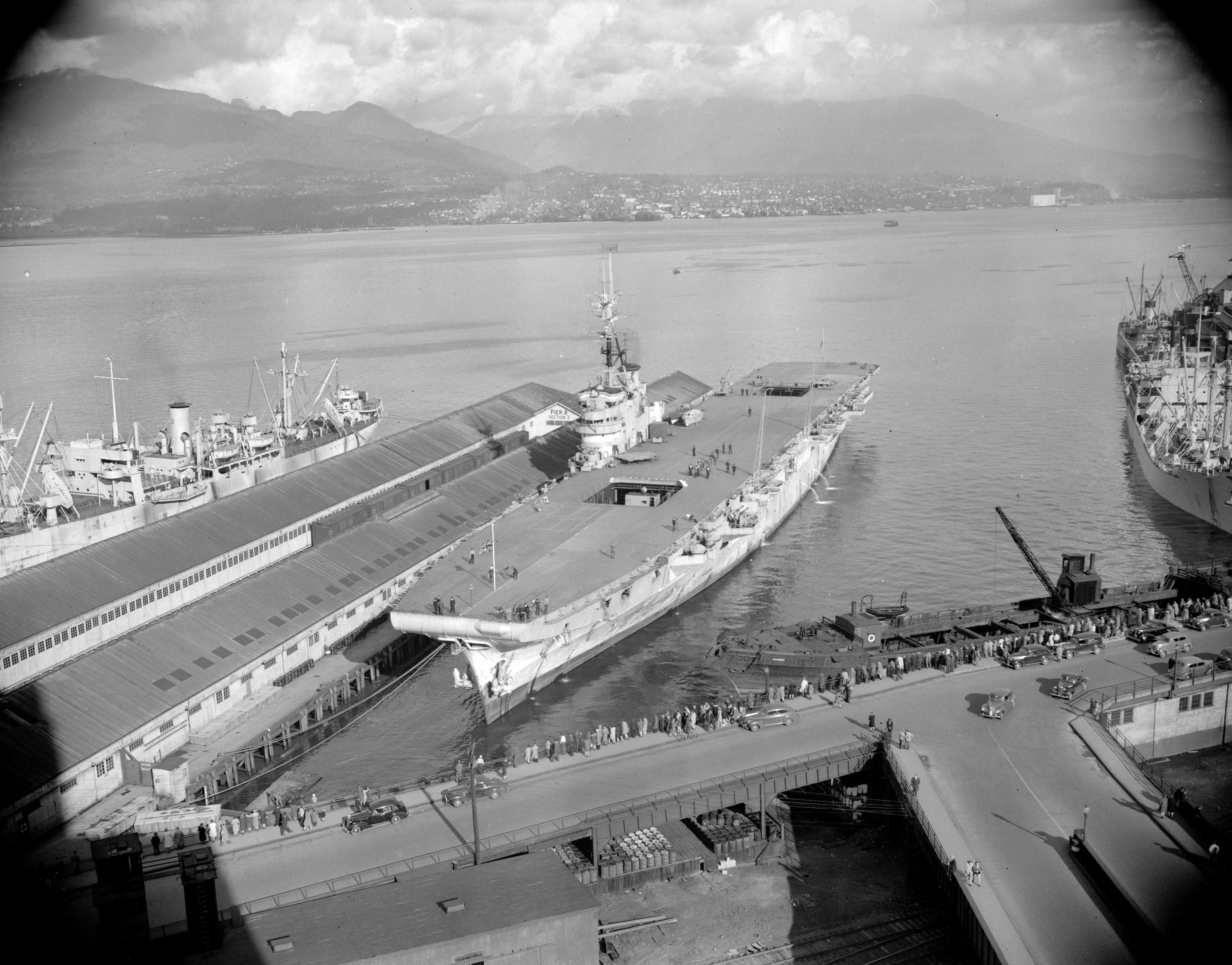
HMCS Warrior in Vancouver, British Columbia

The RCN experienced problems with the unheated equipment during operations in cold North Atlantic waters off eastern Canada during 1946. The ship was transferred west to Esquimalt, British Columbia in November 1946, visiting Bermuda, Acapulco, Mexico and San Diego, California before arriving in December. On 18 January 1947, Commodore Harry DeWolf took command of Warrior while the vessel was undergoing repairs to the damages to her hull that had been received during her August grounding. On 31 January, one 825 Squadron's Fireflys was lost along with its pilot off Portland Island during a training mission. It was during this period, that the RCN, facing reduced defence spending and manning constraints, came to the conclusion that they could not operate two aircraft carriers. Negotiations began to return Warrior when Magnificent became ready, with the RCN deeming Warrior unfit for service due to her lack of heating. In February 1947, the aircraft carrier began her voyage back to Halifax, accompanied by the cruiser Uganda and destroyer Crescent. The Canadian group stopped at San Pedro, California before the aircraft carrier transited the Panama Canal by herself, meeting the destroyers Nootka and Micmac on the other side. The three Canadian ships visited Havana, Cuba, marking the first time a Canadian warship had visited the Cuban capital since 1929. Warrior returned to Halifax on 27 March. The ship then sailed for Bermuda with Nootka to take part in a naval exercise with the Royal Navy. Most of mid-1947 was spent undergoing repairs at Halifax and performing short cruises along east coast. In August, Warrior sailed for the United Kingdom where her squadrons would be re-equipped with Firefly Mark IV and Hawker Sea Fury aircraft, returning to Halifax on 28 August. Meanwhile, preparations were being made for the return of Warrior and the acquisition of Magnificent. In November, Magnificent's air group consisting of 826 and 883 Squadrons trained aboard Warrior off the coast of Nova Scotia. Following this, Warrior, escorted by the destroyer Haida sailed to Bermuda where the ship was prepared to be paid off. The ship sailed for the UK on 12 February, arriving at Belfast on 20 February. On 1 March the ship moved to Spithead where the aviation fuel was removed. Warrior was returned to the Royal Navy on 23 March 1948 at Portsmouth.

=== Royal Navy service ===
HMCS Warrior returned to the United Kingdom and was recommissioned as HMS Warrior on 23 March 1948. Warrior was then refitted at Devonport and equipped with a flexible flight deck to test the feasibility of receiving undercarriage-less aircraft; modified de Havilland Sea Vampire aircraft were used to test the concept, which was successful but not introduced into service. The flexible deck was composed of a rubber sheet supported by air bags. The new deck extended from the bow to the barrier forward of the island and was superimposed on the existing flight deck. Aft of the flexible deck, a light steel ramp was placed over the flight deck rising to 2 feet 6 inches (0.8 m) in height with a single arrestor wire. The trials lasted from November 1948 to March 1949 and upon completion, Warrior was paid off into the reserve at Portsmouth.

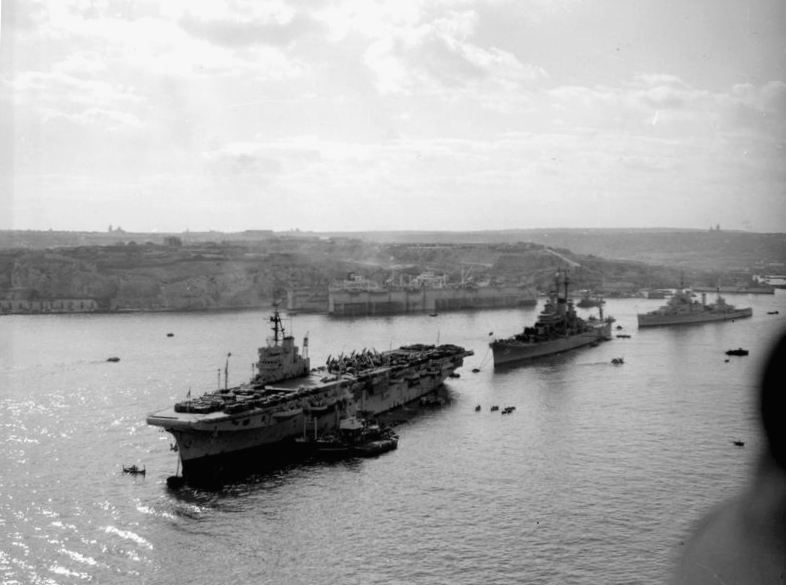
HMS Warrior, USS Des Moines, and HMS Gambia at Grand Harbour, Malta, 1951

Warrior was reactivated in June 1950 and modified to carry troops and aircraft to the Far East during the Korean War, departing in August on the first such mission. In June 1951, with 16 Parachute Brigade embarked, Warrior sailed to Cyprus in response to a crisis in the Middle East. The ship underwent refit during most of 1952 and 1953 at Devonport Dockyard. The ship was fitted with a new lattice mast and new radars with Type 281Q fitted to the mast and Type 277Q radars installed fore and aft of the island. Identification friend or foe aerials were also installed on the mast. The bridge was enlarged and enclosed. The Fleet Air Arm 811 Squadron in Sea Furys and 825 Squadron in Fireflys were embarked after sea trials. During 1954, Warrior was deployed to the Far East, patrolling off the coast of Korea, following the ceasefire. In September, during Operation Passage to Freedom, the ship was among those sent to evacuate non-Communist refugees from Haiphong, North Vietnam to Vung Tau, South Vietnam, transporting more than 3,221 people in two voyages and being awarded a South Vietnamese Presidential Citation.

After returning to England another refit was carried out in 1955 at Devonport. This time Warrior received an angled flight deck of 5 degrees for trials. To install the angled deck, portside sponsons were removed, the angled deck installed portside amidships and the deck itself was upgraded to take aircraft up to 20,000 pounds (9,072 kg). Furthermore, the catapult was upgraded to launch 20,000-pound aircraft and the arrester wire system improved to take the same weight of aircraft at 60 knots (111 km/h). The aircraft carrier also received a mirror landing aid and Type 961 CCA radar. As the only ship in the class to receive the upgrade, it was intended to turn Warrior into a training and trials ship.

Following a short period as a training ship, Warrior was dispatched to the Pacific Ocean, where the aircraft carrier took part in Operation Grapple, the first British hydrogen bomb tests, as the headquarters ship embarking a flight of Westland Whirlwind helicopters and Grumman Avenger AS4 aircraft to collect air samples from the tests and ferry them back for examination. After the operation was completed the Avengers were catapulted into the sea as they were contaminated with radioactivity. Considered surplus to requirements by the late 1950s, the Royal Navy decommissioned Warrior in February 1958 and offered her for sale. The return voyage from the Grapple tests was via Argentina, with port visits and demonstrations to the Argentine Navy, to whom the Admiralty was trying to sell her.

=== Argentine Navy service ===
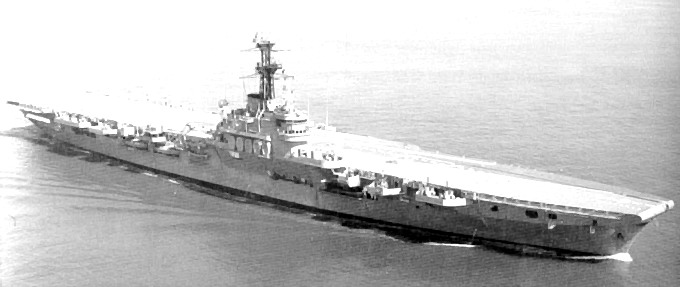
ARA Independencia in 1965

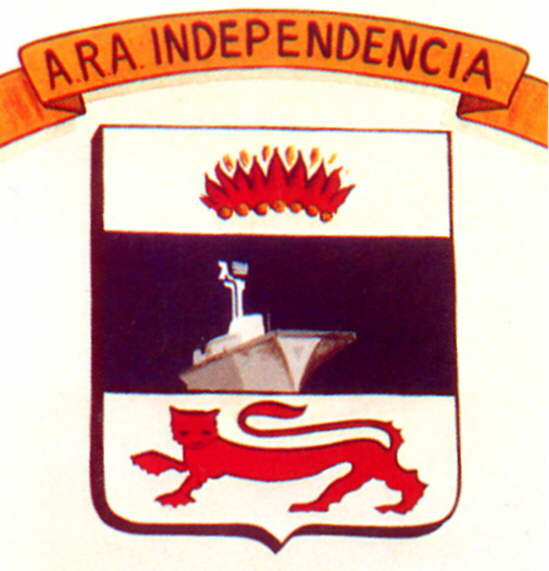
The badge of ARA Independencia

Warrior was sold to Argentina in 1958 and renamed ARA Independencia on 6 August 1958. The Argentine naval ensign was raised on 4 November at Portsmouth and sailed for Argentina on 10 December. The Argentine Naval Aviation began air operations from Independencia on 8 June 1959, even before the vessel was officially commissioned into the fleet. The ship was commissioned into the Argentine Navy on 8 July 1959. (Note: Hobbs claims the ship was commissioned by the Argentine Navy on 24 July 1958.) The anti-aircraft armament was initially reduced to twelve 40 mm guns, soon further reduced to eight. In May 1962 the ship was however provided with one quadruple and nine double mountings of that caliber. After all the modifications the displacement of the ship had climbed to 19,600 long tons (19,900 t) while the vessel's maximum speed had declined to 23 knots (43 km/h; 26 mph).

The air group, which had a maximum of 24 aircraft, was mainly formed from Vought F4U Corsairs, North American SNJ-5Cs Texans and Grumman S2F-1 (S-2A) Trackers. Naval Aviation inventory also included Grumman F9F Panther (the first jet fighters in service with the Argentine Naval Aviation, starting from August 1963 which launched from Independencia) and TF-9J Cougar jets, although Independencia's catapult was not powerful enough to launch them. The ship also used the North American T-28 Trojan trainer. The aircraft carrier ARA Veinticinco de Mayo, also of the British Colossus class but with a more powerful catapult retrofitted while in Dutch service, entered service in 1969, and Independencia moved to the reserve in 1970. She was scrapped in 1971.

== See also ==
- List of aircraft carriers
- List of ships of the Argentine Navy

== Bibliography ==
- Arbuckle, J. Graeme (1987). Badges of the Canadian Navy. Halifax, Nova Scotia: Nimbus Publishing. ISBN 0-920852-49-1.
- Blackman, Raymond V. B., ed. (1953). Jane's Fighting Ships 1953–54. London: Sampson, Low and Marston. OCLC 913556389.
- Brown, David K. (2012). Nelson to Vanguard: Warship Design and Development 1923–1945. Barnsley, UK: Seaforth Publishing. ISBN 978-1-84832-149-6.
- Chesneau, Roger, ed. (1980). Conway's All the World's Fighting Ships 1922–1946. Greenwich, UK: Conway Maritime Press. ISBN 0-85177-146-7.
- Gardiner, Robert; Chumbley, Stephen & Budzbon, Przemysław, eds. (1995). Conway's All the World's Fighting Ships 1947–1995. Annapolis, Maryland: Naval Institute Press. ISBN 1-55750-132-7.
- Hobbs, David (2013). British Aircraft Carriers: Design, Development and Service Histories. Barnsley, UK: Seaforth Publishing. ISBN 978-1-84832-138-0.
- Kealy, J. D. F. & Russell, E. C. (1967). A History of Canadian Naval Aviation 1918–1962. Ottawa: Queen's Printer. OCLC 460555.
- Macpherson, Ken & Barrie, Ron (2002). The Ships of Canada's Naval Forces 1910–2002 (Third ed.). St. Catharines, Ontario: Vanwell Publishing. ISBN 1-55125-072-1.
- McCart, Neil (2002). The Colossus-Class Aircraft Carriers 1944–1972. Cheltenham, UK: Fan Publishing. ISBN 1-90122-506-2.
- Milner, Marc (2010). Canada's Navy: The First Century (2nd ed.). Toronto: University of Toronto Press. ISBN 978-0-8020-9604-3.
