= Grenfell Mission =

The Grenfell Mission was a philanthropic organization that provided medical and social services to people in rural communities of northern Newfoundland and Labrador. It was founded by Sir Wilfred Grenfell in 1892 as a branch of The Royal National Mission to Deep Sea Fishermen based in Britain.

The medical staff and volunteers of the Grenfell Mission were from many countries in addition to Canada, such as the United States, Scotland, and England. Roads between settlements did not exist during much of the time that the Grenfell Mission supplied services, so in summer, nurses and doctors travelled to patients by boat, and in the winter, by dog team or (in later years) airplane. Certain drugs and medical supplies were not available in the Mission's remote setting, so staff were obliged to use inventive procedures.

Tuberculosis occurred at epidemic proportions in the 1940s in northern Newfoundland and Labrador. "The role that the Grenfell Mission played in the near eradication of tuberculosis was indeed one of its most outstanding achievements".

In 1914, the Mission Incorporated as the International Grenfell Association. The organization was governed by a board of directors with representatives of the five supporting organizations - the Grenfell Association of America (New York), the New England Grenfell Association (Boston), the Grenfell Association of Great Britain and Ireland (London), the Grenfell Labrador Medical Mission (Ottawa), and the Grenfell Association of Newfoundland (St. John's). It functioned in this capacity until 1981, when responsibility for health services in the region transferred to the provincial government. In 2005, the Labrador-Grenfell Regional Authority was formed with the support of the provincial government to continue to provide care to around 37,000 people in northern Newfoundland and Labrador.

== Art program ==
The Grenfell Mission established a Village Industry Department prior to 1930. Artists came from abroad to support the artistic endeavors of the residents of northern Newfoundland and Labrador.

The Grenfell Mission was famous for its burlap rugs, which were sold to hospitals in the United States and Britain. Encouraged and promoted by Dr. Grenfell, the rug makers of the mission sometimes used designs created by Mrs. Grenfell. Beginning in the early 20th century, the International Grenfell Association (IGA) hired Jessie Luther of Providence, Rhode Island, to set up and direct the Grenfell Industrial Department. Grenfell established retail shops in England and in several U.S. cities. These shops were staffed by volunteers and augmented by travelling salesmen. Following the death of Dr. Grenfell and the surge in machine-made rug production, the business gradually failed. Grenfell rugs remain highly prized by folk art collectors.

In 2008 Grenfell Handicrafts appointed Christian Corbet as Artist in Residence, who created mats and rugs based on his abstracted paintings.

== Notable staff ==
Staff and volunteers who worked at the mission, some have published memoirs.

- Sir Wilfred Grenfell (founder)
- Elliott Merrick (teacher) and his wife Kate (nurse)
- Cluny Macpherson (physician)
- Diana Ross (writer, artist)
- Harry Paddon (physician)
- William Anthony Paddon (surgeon)
- Evarts G. Loomis (physician)
- Elizabeth Bristol Greenleaf (teacher)
- Kirkina Mucko (nurse)
- Ada Margaret Brayton (chapter president)
- Carolyn F. Ulrich (librarian)
- Frank Houghton (manager)
- Herbert I. Margolis (physician)
- Evarts G. Loomis (physician)
- Matthew H. Liang (physician)
- Varick Frissell (physician)
- Robert B. Salter (surgeon)
- George W. Corner (physician)
- Elizabeth Burchill (nurse)
- Francis Bowes Sayre Sr. (lawyer)
- Jerome Davis (private secretary)
- A. Yale Massey (physician)
