= Herbert I. Margolis =

American orthodontist

- Born: September 1, 1900; Russian Empire
- Died: February 11, 1984 (aged 83); New York City
- Education: Harvard School of Dental Medicine
- Known for: President of American Academy of Dental Science, Developer of ACCO Appliance and Margolis Cephalostat
- Medical career
- Profession: Dentist
- Sub-specialties: Orthodontics

Herbert Israel Margolis (September 1, 1900 – February 11, 1984) was an American orthodontist who was known for his contributions towards field of Orthodontics. He was the President of American Academy of Dental Science and contributed in developing what is known as Margolis Cephalostat which is used in orthodontic diagnosis. He also developed the ACCO appliance.

== Life ==
Margolis was born in the Russian Empire in 1900. After the early death of his father who was an attorney, he moved with his mother to Boston, United States in 1904. He graduated from Harvard School of Dental Medicine in 1921 and joined the Grenfell Mission to Labrador the following year. After that he studied with Martin Dewey for next 18 months. He then returned to Boston and joined the faculty of Harvard Dental School in addition to establishing his private practice in the city also.

He died at the age of 83 in 1984 in New York City. Margolis was married to Annette Markwett and had a daughter, Eleanor Holman and a son, James Margolis.

== Career ==
While his stay in Boston, Margolis started working with Ernest Hooton, a noted anthropologist, on the cephalometric investigations looking at anatomy and evolution of the face. In 1944, Margolis became the chair of the Department of Orthodontics at Tufts University School of Dental Medicine . He was the chair until 1960, after which he became the chair of the Orthodontics Department at Henry M. Goldman School of Dental Medicine. During his career, he worked extensively on cephalometric radiographic analysis.

He established Tufts University Cleft Palate Institute and served its director from 1953 to 1960. He also served as a consultant for Department of Mental Health and Department of Public Welfare for the city of Boston after retiring from his private practice in 1967.

== Cephalometric analysis ==
He developed a maxillofacial triangle for analysis of cephalometric radiograph, where he selected spheno-occipital synchondrosis as a midcranial landmark due to it being last suture to fuse in the skull. He was one of the first to point out the relationship between the lower incisors and the mandibular plane angle, a concept which was later adopted by Dr Charles H. Tweed. Although he was first to say that, in orthodontics not every case has to be finished at angle of 90 degrees between lower incisors and mandibular plane angle.

He also developed the fixed cassette distance which standardized magnification and serial superimposition.

== Positions and awards ==
- Albert H. Ketcham Award
- Tweed Foundation, President
- Massachusetts Dental Society, President
- American Academy of Dental Science, President
- Alpha Omega Dental Fraternity, President

== See also ==
- ACCO appliance
- List of orthodontic functional appliances
