= Journal of Clinical Orthodontics =

- Discipline: Orthodontics
- Language: English
- Edited by: Neal D. Kravitz

Publication details
- Former name: Journal of Practical Orthodontics
- History: 1967–present
- Publisher: JPO, Inc.
- Frequency: Monthly

Standard abbreviations
- ISO 4: J. Clin. Orthod.

Indexing
- CODEN: JCLOB9
- ISSN: 0022-3875
- OCLC no.: 212370277

Links
- Journal homepage; Online access

The Journal of Clinical Orthodontics is a monthly peer-reviewed medical journal covering the practical aspects of orthodontics and practice management. The current editor-in-chief is Neal D. Kravitz, DMD, MS. It was established in 1967 as the Journal of Practical Orthodontics, obtaining its current title in 1970.

== Abstracting and indexing ==
The journal is abstracted and indexed in MEDLINE/PubMed and CINAHL.
