= Wilfred Grenfell =

British medical missionary (1865–1940)

Sir Wilfred Grenfell KCMG
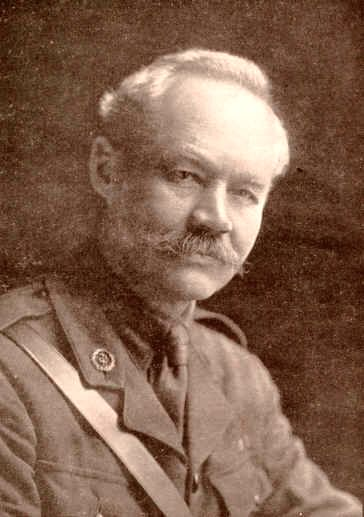
- Born: 28 February 1865; Parkgate, Cheshire, England
- Died: 9 October 1940 (aged 75); Charlotte, Vermont, United States
- Education: London Hospital Medical College
- Occupations: Missionary; writer

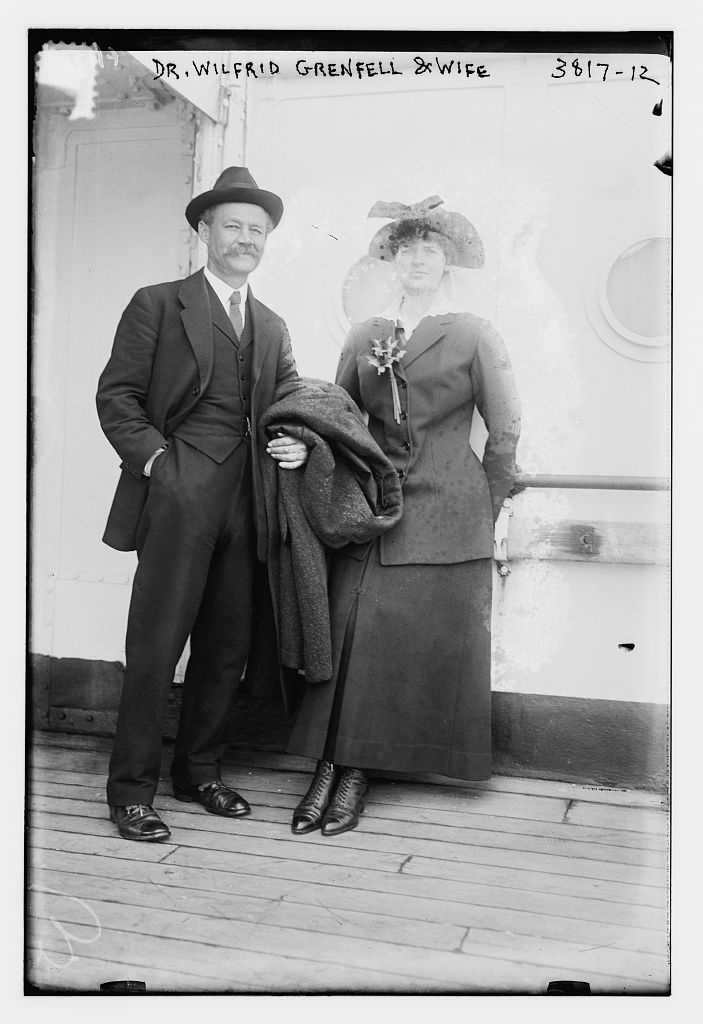
Wilfred Grenfell and his wife in 1916

Sir Wilfred Thomason Grenfell KCMG (28 February 1865 – 9 October 1940) was a British medical missionary to Newfoundland, who wrote books on his work and other topics.

== Early life and education ==
He was born at Parkgate, Cheshire, England, on 28 February 1865, the Son of Rev. Algernon Sidney Grenfell, headmaster of Mostyn House School, and Jane Georgiana Hutchison.

Grenfell moved to London in 1882. He then commenced the study of medicine at the London Hospital Medical College (now part of Barts and The London School of Medicine and Dentistry) under the tutelage of Sir Frederick Treves. He graduated in 1888.

== Career ==
The Royal National Mission to Deep Sea Fishermen sent Grenfell to Newfoundland in 1892 to improve the plight of coastal inhabitants and fishermen. That mission began in earnest in 1892 when he recruited two nurses and two doctors for hospitals at Indian Harbour, Labrador and later opened cottage hospitals along the coast of Labrador. The mission expanded greatly from its initial mandate to one of developing schools, an orphanage, cooperatives, industrial work projects, and social work. Although founded to serve the local area, the mission developed to include the Indigenous people and settlers along the coasts of Labrador and the eastern side of the Great Northern Peninsula of western Newfoundland. One of the children Grenfell assisted was an Inuk girl, Kirkina, for whom he helped secure artificial limbs and later the Grenfell Mission educated her in nursing and midwifery.

In 1907, Grenfell imported a group of 300 reindeer from Norway to provide food and serve as draft animals in Newfoundland. Unbeknownst to him, some of the animals carried a parasitic roundworm, Elaphostrongylus rangiferi, that then spread to native caribou herds. The reindeer herd eventually disappeared; however, the parasite took hold and causes cerebrospinal elaphostrongylosis (CSE) in caribou, a disease well known in reindeer in Scandinavia.

In 1908, Grenfell was on his way with his dogs to a Newfoundland village for a medical emergency when he got caught in "slob", from which he managed to get onto an ice-pan with the dogs. He was forced to sacrifice some of his dogs to make a warm, fur coat for himself. After drifting for several days without food or fresh water, he was rescued by some villagers in the area. Because of this experience he buried the dogs and put up a plaque saying, "Who gave their lives for me."

By 1914 the mission had gained international status. In order to manage its property and affairs, the International Grenfell Association, a non-profit mission society, was founded to support Grenfell's work. The Association operated until 1981, as an NGO. It had responsibility for delivery of healthcare and social services in northern Newfoundland and Labrador. After 1981 a governmental agency, The Grenfell Regional Health Services Board took over the operational responsibility. The International Grenfell Association, having divested itself of all properties and operational responsibility for health and social services, boarding schools and hospitals then became a supporting association making grants and funding scholarships for medical training.

For his years of service on behalf of the people of these communities he was later knighted by the King in 1927.

In 1931, Grenfell had a small speaking role in the film, The Viking, in which he narrated the film's prologue and gave a brief statement of the tragic circumstances involving the film's production. During the production of the film, which was filmed on location in Newfoundland, producer Varick Frissell felt that the film needed more action sequences and set out on the ice floes to film them. During filming, the ship, SS Viking on which filming was taking place, exploded, killing Frissell and 27 others.

== Personal life ==
He married Anne Elizabeth Caldwell MacClanahan (died 1938) of Chicago, Illinois, in 1909. They had three children and retired to Vermont after his work in Newfoundland. They were married in 1909 and came to live in the Grenfell House (which they designed together) in St. Anthony, Newfoundland. Anne gave Dr. Grenfell's life comfort and refinement. She became totally involved in his work. She organized his fundraising tours and lectures, edited his books and helped secure scholarships for the children of the area to continue their education. Although Anne was ill towards the end of her life, she kept her pain hidden from her husband and took care of him until she died in 1938.

== Death and legacy ==
Grenfell died of a coronary thrombosis at Kinloch House in Charlotte, Vermont on 9 October 1940. His ashes were brought to St Anthony, where they were placed inside a rock face overlooking the harbour.

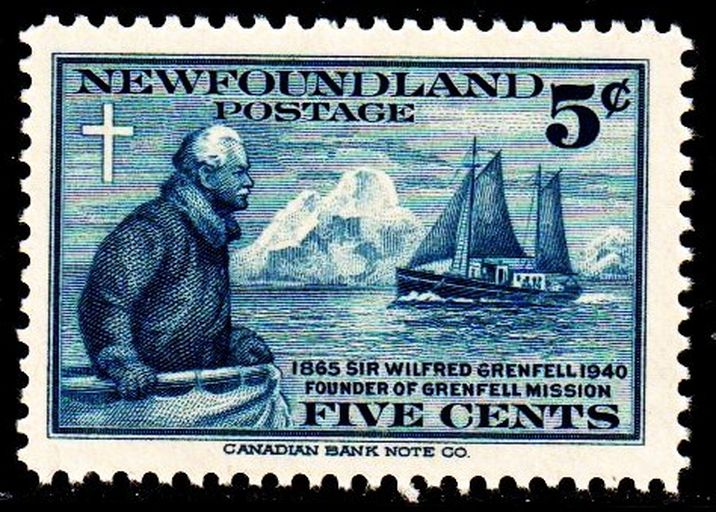
Postage issue of 1941

The Sir Wilfred Thomason Grenfell Historical Society was formed in 1978. The society purchased Grenfell's home in St. Anthony, Newfoundland and Labrador. The home has been restored as a museum and archives. The Sir Wilfred Thomason Grenfell Historical Society with the support of Provincial Government and the International Grenfell Association began construction of an interpretation centre in St. Anthony and it was opened in 1997. This facility added to the existing house and serves to promote the legacy to thousands of visitors each year. The Grenfell Interpretation Centre also is used by other organizations for meetings and events. A large interpretive display is housed there and provides historical background surrounding the work of Sir Wilfred Thomason Grenfell.

In 1979, Memorial University's West Coast Regional College was renamed to honour Grenfell.

Grenfell is honoured with a feast day on the liturgical calendar of the Episcopal Church (USA) on 9 October.

A statue of Grenfell on the grounds of the Confederation Building in St. John's, Newfoundland and Labrador (pictured 2023)

Grenfell is also honoured as the namesake of the Canadian Coast Guard patrol vessel Sir Wilfred Grenfell, constructed by Marystown Shipyard Ltd., at Marystown, Newfoundland and Labrador in 1984–1985 and in service since 1987, replacing an earlier CCGS Grenfell. As of 2025, CCGS Sir Wilfred Grenfell operates out of Victoria, BC, on Canada's west coast, as a buoy tender.

=== Literary inspiration ===
A unique figure, Grenfell served to inspire at least two characters in Canadian literature: Dr. Luke in Norman Duncan's Doctor Luke of the Labrador (1904) and Dr. Tocsin in White Eskimo by Harold Horwood (1972).

A biography for children (middle-high school) was written in 1942, by Genevieve Fox. Published by Thomas Y. Crowell Co. The book had second and third printings as well.

His following well-known statement is found in the April 21 entry of his "A Labrador Logbook:" "The service we render to others is really the rent we pay for our room on this earth. It is obvious that man is himself a traveller; that the purpose of this world is not 'To have and to hold' but 'To give and to serve.' There can be no other meaning."

=== Fabric ===
Mill owner Walter Haythornthwaite of Burnley, Lancashire created a cloth for Sir Wilfred Grenfell after attending a Grenfell lecture. Designed to withstand the conditions of the Labrador coast, it is a 600 thread-per-inch woven cotton gabardine that became known as 'Grenfell Cloth' from 1923. The cloth became the signature fabric of the Grenfell Clothing brand which is, to this day, manufactured in the United Kingdom.

== Awards ==
- Companion of the Most Distinguished Order of St. Michael and St. George – 1907
- Honorary Doctorate of Medicine, University of Oxford – 1907 (the first to be granted)
- Murchison Prize, Royal Geographical Society – 1911 (awarded for his charts of Labrador)
- Knighthood – 1927 (recognition of medical, educational and social work)
- Honorary Knight for Life, Loyal Knights of the Round Table, Fifth Rank – 1928 (for great service to humanity)
- Induction into the Canadian Medical Hall of Fame – 1997

In 1979, the Corner Brook campus of Memorial University of Newfoundland was renamed Sir Wilfred Grenfell College in his honour. In 2010, following a debate to rename this campus, the name Grenfell Campus, Memorial University of Newfoundland was chosen, to reflect the campus' ties to the spirit of Sir Wilfred Grenfell's legacy.

== Publications ==
Essay by Grenfell include:

- What the Bible Means to Me (1910)

Books by Grenfell include:

- Vikings of To-Day: or, Life and Medical Work among the Fishermen of Labrador (1896)
- The Harvest of the Sea (1905)
- Off the Rocks: Stories of the Deep-sea Fisherfolk of Labrador (1906)
- Adrift on an Ice-Pan (1909)
- What Will You Do with Jesus Christ (1910)
- What the Church Means to Me: A Frank Confession and a Friendly Estimate by an Insider (1911)
- The Adventure of Life (1912)
- Down North on the Labrador (1912)
- What Life Means to Me (1913)
- Tales of the Labrador (1916)
- A Labrador Doctor (1919)
- Labrador Days: Tales of the Sea Toilers (1919)
- Yourself and Your Body (1924), written at the time when he said his two sons had just reached the age of Whys? and Hows?
- What Christ Means to Me (1926)
- Labrador Looks at the Orient: Notes of Travel in the Near and the Far East (1928)
- Forty Years for Labrador (1932)
- The Romance of Labrador (1934)

== See also ==
- CCGS Sir Wilfred Grenfell

== Notes ==
Academic offices
Preceded by Fridtjof Nansen	Rector of the University of St Andrews; 1928 - 1931	Succeeded by Field Marshal Jan Smuts
