= Turbot War =

1994–96 dispute between Canada and Spain

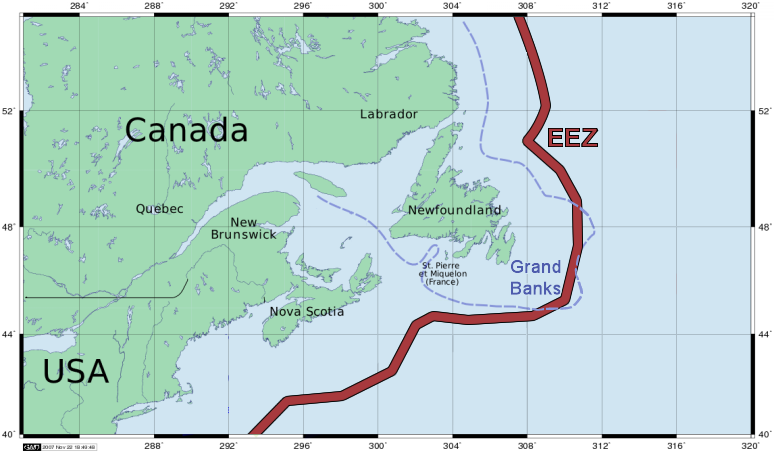
- The location of the bulk of the conflict
Date	March 9 – April 16, 1995 (38 days)
Location	Grand Banks of Newfoundland and the English Channel
Result	Canadian victory

Belligerents
Canada; United Kingdom; Ireland	Spain; Portugal; European Union

Commanders and leaders
Jean Chrétien; Brian Tobin; Earle McCurdy; Lawrence E. Murray	Felipe González; Eduardo Serra; Javier Solana; Enrique Dávila González (surrendered); Emma Bonino ( European Commission)

Units involved
Royal Canadian Navy	Spanish Navy

Casualties and losses
None	(Spain) 1 fishing vessel captured by Canadian Authorities British Isles: 1 fishing vessel arrested/detained
- 1 British fishing vessel mistakenly captured by French authorities

The Turbot War (Spanish: Guerra del Fletán; French: Guerre du flétan) was an international fishing dispute and bloodless conflict between Canada and Spain (with the European Union) and their respective supporters.

On 9 March 1995, Canadian officials from the Canadian Coast Guard vessel Cape Roger boarded the Spanish fishing trawler Estai from Galicia in international waters 220 nautical miles (410 km; 250 mi) off Canada's East Coast after they had fired three 50-calibre machine-gun bursts over her bow. They arrested the trawler's crew, then forced Estai to St. John's harbour. Canada claimed that European Union factory ships were illegally overfishing Greenland halibut (also known as Greenland turbot) in the Northwest Atlantic Fisheries Organization (NAFO) regulated area on the Grand Banks of Newfoundland, just outside Canada's declared 200-nautical-mile (370 km) exclusive economic zone (EEZ).

The dispute spread to the British Isles where British and Irish governments gave their support to Canada, risking their status in the EU Community. A number of Spanish fishing vessels were boarded and arrested as a result due to illegal fishing practices. The EU put pressure on Spain to back down and agree to a deal. Eventually, a deal was reached on 5 April in spite of Spanish objections; they were forced to leave the disputed zone. Canada's right to eject foreign fishing vessels from the area, using military force if necessary, was also accepted.

== Background ==
Territorial seas have changed over time, having begun with a 3 nautical miles (5.6 km) "cannon shot" territorial sea, followed by the long-standing extension to a 12 nautical miles (22 km) standard. The economic control of the waters surrounding nations to 200 nautical miles (370 km) exclusive economic zones (EEZ) was agreed at the conference on the Third United Nations Convention on the Law of the Sea in 1982 and became recognized internationally in 1994.

From the 1950s to 70s, domestic and foreign fishing fleets became increasingly industrialized, with massive factory freezer trawlers fishing out of Newfoundland ports. Foreign fleets were based in Newfoundland and could fish 12 nautical miles (22 km) offshore, and domestic fleets could fish in both the territorial sea and the offshore. By the 1970s, the overfishing by industrial vessels in the waters of the other provinces of Eastern Canada was evident although each subsequent federal government continued to ignore the problem and even contributed to it by using the issuance of fishing licences for more inshore and offshore domestic vessels.

Many nations declared 200 nautical mile EEZs, including the US, Canada did in 1977. The EEZ boundaries became a foreign policy issue when overlapping claims existed, as was the case between Canada and the US in the Gulf of Maine, Dixon Entrance, Strait of Juan de Fuca, and Beaufort Sea as well as between Canada and France in the case of St. Pierre and Miquelon. After the Canadian declaration of its 200 nautical mile EEZ in 1977, fishermen on the whole in Eastern Canada could fish unhindered out to the limit without fear of competing with foreign fleets. The government provided subsidies to increase the fishing fleet and local industry. Meanwhile, the annual Total Allowable Catch (TAC) was set so high that fishing mortality was double that of the stock's Maximum Sustainable Yield (MSY).

During the late 1970s and early 1980s, Canada's domestic offshore fleet grew as fishermen and fish processing companies rushed to take advantage. It was then noticed that the foreign fleets now pushed out to 200 nautical miles (370 km) offshore and excluded from the rich Canadian waters were increasing their harvest in the small areas of the Grand Banks, outside the EEZ. Canada's fishery scientists assumed only 5% of the Northern cod stocks was living in international waters regulated by NAFO, and 95% of the cod stock was inside the Canadian EEZ, where only Canadian vessels were allowed to fish. By the late 1980s, smaller catches of Northern Cod were being reported along the Atlantic coast of Canada as the federal government and citizens of coastal regions in the area began to face the reality that domestic and foreign overfishing had taken its toll. Stocks of cod in and around Canada's EEZ were severely depleted. Reluctant to act because of its already-declining political popularity, the federal government was forced to take drastic action in 1992, and a total moratorium was declared indefinitely for Northern Cod. The TAC for the Canadian EEZ and NAFO regulated area was based on Canadian scientific advice, which turned out to be wrong and the Northern cod stock collapsed in 1992 and has never recovered.

The immediate impact was felt most in Newfoundland, followed by the Atlantic coast of Nova Scotia. The nascent Northwest Atlantic Fisheries Organization, organised after the 1977 EEZ declarations to co-ordinate conservation efforts in Canada, the US, and member nations in Europe also declared a ban, but it was implemented too late to be effective. Cod had five to ten years before being caught in record numbers, but it had vanished almost overnight and considered for endangered species protection.

The economic impact in coastal Newfoundland was unprecedented. To lessen the impact that its policies of permitting overfishing had exacted upon rural Newfoundlanders, the federal government swiftly created a relief program called the "Atlantic Groundfish Strategy" (TAGS) to provide short- to medium-term financial support and employment retraining for the longer term. Despite TAGS, Newfoundland and coastal Nova Scotian communities began to experience an out-migration on a scale not seen in Canada since the prairie Dust Bowl of the 1930s. The anger at federal politicians was palpable. With the wholesale rejection of the new Prime Minister Kim Campbell, the incoming Prime Minister Jean Chrétien's Liberals were going to face the ongoing wrath of voters since their entire livelihoods had been decimated as a result of decades of federal neglect and mismanagement, and their communities, property values, net worth, and way of life were declining rapidly.

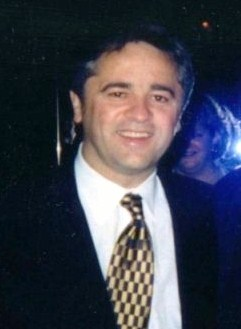
Brian Tobin was the Canadian politician who was largely responsible for managing the conflict, which earned him the nicknames "Captain Canada" and "The Turbotnator."

In the years since the cod moratorium, federal fisheries policy makers and scientists attempted to find a replacement species that could at least reinject economic stimulus into the affected regions. The ground fishery was a fraction of what it had been during the cod years but had some bright spots, one of which was the Greenland halibut, commonly known in Canada as turbot. Demand for the turbot had decreased because of a common dislike for its taste in the European Union.

Canada was not alone in recognising the growing value of the turbot, and foreign fishing fleets operating off the 200 nautical mile EEZ were also beginning to pursue the species in increasing numbers as a response to the Northern cod moratorium. However, the turbot was not a fish under quota regulation in NAFO until the autumn of 1994, when it established a catch limit. Until then, Spanish vessels had explored turbot fishery on the Nose and Tail of the Grand Banks.

The Canadians claimed that the turbot had relocated outside their EEZ to deeper waters, and they should have quotas based on their historical fisheries inside its EEZ. On the other hand, the Spanish and the Portuguese claimed that was an unexplored stock. Since they had initially started exploring the stocks, Spain and Portugal believed that they should have historic rights to the turbot fishery on the Grand Banks Nose and Tail, based on their historical catches. The total reported annual catches grew steadily from 27,000 t in 1990 to 62,000 t in 1994, when the Spanish and Portuguese vessels started to explore that fishery after other stocks were closed. Based on their catch history, the two countries claimed they should have 75% of the total turbot quota.

The turbot issue came before the NAFO annual meeting in Dartmouth, Nova Scotia, in 1994. After questioning the scientists' advice, the EU proposed a TAC of 40,000 t although Canada argued for 15,000 t. The meeting settled on 27,000 t. A meeting was scheduled for Brussels on 30 January through 1 February 1995 to establish a distribution key for allocating quotas among the contracting parties. The EU approved the overall catch limit at the December meeting of the Fisheries Council over the objections of Spain and Portugal, which argued that the EU should set an autonomous quota of 30,000 t on the basis that scientific evidence allowed for a 40,000 t TAC even though NAFO's Scientific Council had pointedly refrained from recommending a figure.

Canada and NAFO had tracked about 50 violations of boats crossing the 200 nautical mile EEZ limit to fish illegally within Canadian waters and recorded the use of illegal gear and overfishing outside Canadian waters. There was a growing concern in Canada that the turbot stock, like the Northern cod in 1992, was threatened by collapse.

In October 1994, the Minister of Fisheries and Oceans Brian Tobin, contacted the Spanish and Portuguese ambassadors and asked them to honour the NAFO regulation requiring countries to inspect their flag vessels to ensure that they were following the NAFO technical regulations. No improvement occurred.

In 1993, the NAFO council had already decided to introduce and test new inspection measures, such as on-board observers, on 10% of the vessels fishing in NAFO-regulated waters outside the Canadian EEZ and Vessel Monitoring System (VMS). The European Commission had tried to extend its jurisdiction and the power of its inspectors in 1993, but had been turned down by the European Union Council. However the EU Council could only try to persuade national governments to follow the internationally-agreed rules as well as the rules within EU waters.

Brian Tobin directed the Department of Fisheries and Oceans (DFO), along with the Department of Foreign Affairs and International Trade (DFAIT), to begin a very aggressive dialogue with the EU over the presence of its fishing fleet and its practices, particularly the use of illegal trawl nets just outside the Canadian EEZ while fishing for turbot. Tobin's critics in Canada noted that he was likely using his department as a political prop to shore up support during the increased social unrest in Maritime Canada, but in the winter of 1995, Tobin directed DFO to establish a legal argument that could be made for the seizure of a foreign vessel in international waters by using the premise of conservation.

At the December 1994 NAFO conference in Brussels, both the EU and Canada claimed 75% of the agreed 27,000 tonnes TAC for turbot in the NAFO-regulated area. Both parties cited their historical catches: Canada before 1992 and the EU after 1992. The Canadian position was that it objected to the use of historic catches. Instead, it argued the special interest of the coastal state in the Law of the Sea should be used for setting the national quotas.

On 1 March 1995, the EU Council ignored a last-minute plea from Canada and unanimously agreed to invoke the objection procedure under the NAFO agreement and to set a unilateral quota of 18,630t (69% of the TAC). Tobin tried to put the Law of the Sea's principles on coastal states' special interest to the test, as a first mover. Initially, Tobin had tried to persuade his Ministry of Foreign Affairs to make a unilateral extension of the Canadian EEZ to the entire Grand Banks, but that was rejected by the Canadian prime minister. Instead, Tobin declared that on 3 March 1995, the Coastal Fisheries Protection Act regulations had been broadened to make it an offence for Spanish and Portuguese vessels to fish for turbot on the Nose and Tail of the Grand Banks. On 6 March 1995, Tobin managed to have the Canadian cabinet authorize that extension of the law.

The same day, an EU reply came in a strongly-worded message from the Foreign Affairs Council that defended the EU's right to use the NAFO objection procedure, restated its commitment to conservation, and condemned the Coastal Fisheries Protection Act as a violation of international law.

Sections of the Canadian government agreed with the EU opinion on the unlawfulness of Canada arresting EU vessels outside the Canadian EEZ. There were strong opponents in the federal cabinet from the Ministry of Justice and the Ministry of Defence and the Royal Canadian Mounted Police (RCMP), which had different concerns over confronting the European Union over a fellow NATO member. Tobin managed to frame the issue and to gain the support of the prime minister. That settled the issue in the cabinet since it had been persuaded on the arrest of a Spanish vessel if diplomacy failed.

== War ==
=== Estai incident ===
Tobin and the federal Cabinet told the DFO to demonstrate Canadian resolve on the issue by "making an example" of a European Union fishing vessel. On 9 March 1995, an offshore patrol aircraft detected the Spanish stern trawler Estai in international waters outside Canada's 200-nautical-mile EEZ. Armed DFO patrol vessels, Cape Roger, Leonard J. Cowley and Canadian Coast Guard ship Sir Wilfred Grenfell, intercepted and pursued Estai, which cut its weighted trawl net and fled after an initial boarding attempt. A chase that lasted several hours ended after the Canadian Fisheries Patrol vessel Cape Roger fired a .50 calibre machine gun across the Estai's bow. The Sir Wilfred Grenfell used high-pressure fire-fighting water cannon to deter other Spanish fishing vessels from disrupting the operation. Finally, armed DFO Fishery Officers and Royal Canadian Mounted Police (RCMP) officers boarded Estai in international waters on the Grand Banks.

Estai was escorted to St. John's, Newfoundland, and arrived with great fanfare across the region, the province, and the country. The Federal Court of Canada processed the case and the charges against the crew. Spain and the European Union protested vehemently, threatened boycotts against Canada, and wished to have the case heard at the International Court of Justice in The Hague, Netherlands.

On 11 March 1995, the Spanish Navy deployed the Serviola-class patrol boat Atalaya to protect its country's fishing vessels. The Spanish Navy also prepared a surface task group with frigates and tankers, but Spain eventually decided against sending it.

Tobin and his department ignored the controversy and instead had the oversized trawl net salvaged, which Estai had cut free. The DFO contracted a Fishery Products International ground fish trawler to drag for Estai's trawl. On the first attempt, it retrieved the Estai's net, which had been cut. It was found that Estai was using a liner with a mesh size that was smaller than permitted by the Northwest Atlantic Fisheries Organisation (NAFO). The net was shipped to New York City, where Tobin called an international press conference on board a rented barge in the East River outside the United Nations headquarters. There, the net from Estai was displayed, hanging from an enormous crane, and Tobin used the occasion to shame the Spanish and EU governments and pointed out the small size of the holes in the net which are illegal in Canada. Spain never denied that the net was from Estai but continued to protest Canada's use of "extraterritorial force." The Spanish government asked the International Court of Justice for leave to hear a case claiming that Canada had no right to detain Estai. However, the court later refused to hear the case.

On the same day that Tobin was in New York, the United Kingdom blocked a European Union proposal to impose sanctions on Canada. Tobin claimed that Canada would not enter into negotiations as long as illegal fishing continued and demanded the withdrawal of all fishing vessels in the area as a precondition. On 15 March, the owners of Estai posted a $500,000 bond for the vessel, and it was returned to Spain. Subsequently, the rest of the fishing fleet also left the area, and preliminary talks were scheduled for the upcoming G7 conference. These talks failed, as Spain refused to change its position, and Spanish fishing vessels subsequently returned to Grand Banks. Spain also implemented a visa mandate for all Canadians visiting or planning to visit the country. That resulted in several Canadians being deported from Spain who had been there legally when the visa mandate was adopted. The visa mandate was overturned by the EU in 1996. Negotiations ceased on 25 March, and the following day, Canadian ships cut the nets of the Portuguese trawler Pescamero Uno. The Spanish Navy responded by deploying a second patrol boat. Canadian warships and patrol planes in the vicinity were authorized by Canadian Prime Minister Jean Chrétien to fire on Spanish vessels that exposed their guns.

On 27 March 1995, EU Fisheries Commissioner Emma Bonino called the seizure "an act of organised piracy." Spain demanded for the Canadian government to return the ship to its captain and crew along with its catch of Greenland halibut, or turbot. It claimed that Estai had been fishing in international waters.

=== British Isles incidents ===
Although Spain was getting political support from the EU, including naval support from Germany among others, the United Kingdom and Ireland supported Canada. British Prime Minister John Major risked his status within the EU community by speaking out against Spain.

Some British fishing boats started flying Canadian flags to show their support. That brought the conflict to European waters when a Cornish fishing boat from Newlyn flew the Canadian flag and was arrested by French authorities, which believed it to be a Canadian trawler illegally landing fish in France.

That dragged the British and the Irish from their position of passive backing into full support of the Canadians. Overnight, Canadian flags began to fly from all manner of British and Irish vessels. Ships of the Irish Coast Guard arrested five Spanish-crewed vessels in April as a result of illegal fishing practices.

The rest of the EU rallied behind France and Spain but hesitated to make any mobilizations against the British, the Irish, or the Canadians.

Following the capture of the Newlyn-based trawler, Iceland took the side of the EU against Britain in light of its similar dispute with the British in the 1970s. While no military mobilization took place, Iceland placed political pressure on the United Kingdom and Ireland. The British and the Irish governments ignored these actions and continued their support of Tobin and the other Canadians.

On April 14 the Royal Navy patrol boat HMS Shetland boarded and arrested the Spanish fishing trawler Chimbote near the Scilly Isles on suspicion of illegal fishing. As the vessel was escorted into Plymouth, local fishing boats joined the flotilla again flying the Canadian flag in support.

=== Negotiations and resolution ===
Direct negotiations between the EU and Canada eventually restarted, and a deal was reached on 5 April. Spain, however, rejected it and demanded better terms. After Canada threatened to remove Spanish fishing vessels by force, the EU pressured Spain into finally reaching a settlement on 15 April.

Canada reimbursed the $500,000 that had been paid for Estai's release, repealed the CFPR provision that allowed the arrest of Spanish vessels, and reduced Canada's own turbot allocation. A new international regime to observe EU and Canadian fishing vessels was also created and made a number of trial measures permanent, like on-board observers and VMS.

== Aftermath ==
Once the resolution had passed and Spain had backed down, Canada proclaimed victory. The Turbot War however exposed some of the gaps in international fishery law and the weaknesses of NAFO. The outcome spurred the development of new international legal mechanisms that was meant to effectively conserve fisheries and reduce the incidence of armed confrontations between fishing states.

Outside of Canada, European environmentalists, British fishermen and Greenpeace also saw the resolution as a victory, not just for the Turbot and ecology, but also for the cessation of destructive Spanish fishing practices. In Spain however, the resolution to the dispute was seen as a bitter humiliation – the fisherman especially, felt betrayed by the EU and their own government. Madrid attempted to spin success on the outcome of April 15 with the TAC quota it had achieved, but the agreement as a whole was described as 'profoundly unsatisfactory' by officials in the Galician fishing town of Vigo where morale was at a low ebb. Spanish fishing industry officials also predicted a severe loss of jobs and feared the complete loss of their distant water fleet.

At the New York conference the Straddling Fish Stocks Agreement, which implemented the provisions of the United Nations Convention on the Law of the Sea of 10 December 1982 on the conservation and the management of straddling and highly-migratory fish stocks, was signed in December 1995. Tobin framed it as a result of the Canadian standoff with Europe, which found domestic support. The conference in fact repeatedly rejected proposals that would have conflicted with the Law of the Sea Convention, such as provisions that would have given coastal states fishery jurisdiction beyond 200 miles.

The success of the dispute raised Tobin's political profile, and also helped to preserve his political career in Newfoundland at a time when federal politicians were being increasingly vilified This led to his decision in 1996 to pursue the leadership of the Liberal Party of Newfoundland after the resignation of Premier Clyde Wells. Tobin became a widely-discussed future possible leadership candidate for the Liberal Party of Canada. Canadian fishing workers on Canada's East Coast applauded the conviction that Canada was acting as an environmental safeguard against over exploitation, despite the jobs in the fishing industry having disappeared.

Over the next five years Canadian and EU conservation efforts improved but bilateral relations between Canada and Spain recovered more slowly. In June 1996, Canada opened their ports once again to the fleets of the EU and revoked the regulation on ships from Spain and Portugal. Despite the agreement Spain nevertheless continued to challenge the decision and so took it to the International court of justice (ICJ). In 1998 however the ICJ threw out Spain's challenge - because it did not have jurisdiction over Canada on the matter. Canada's agent to the court, Phillippe Kirsch stated that "this is the end of the matter as far as the international court is concerned." Canada's effort into forging closer ties to the EU however proved difficult - Canadian politicians accused Spain of 'setting up road blocks'.

Canadian fishing workers on Canada's East Coast applauded the conviction that Canada was acting as an environmental safeguard against over exploitation, but the jobs in the fishing industry had disappeared. The distant water fleets felt that Canada had destroyed the cod stocks and wanted everyone else to pay part of the cost.

=== NAFO, Canada and EU ===
The 2002 Helsingør meeting in Denmark was a turning point for NAFO and Canada. It marked the beginning of the end of Canada's coastal state dominance of NAFO, the decline of Canada's influence in protecting the fish stocks of the Northwest Atlantic, and the start of the EU's ascendance into the leadership position that Canada had filled for some 25 years. It began when Canada pushed a decision on depth limits for turbot fisheries to a vote and lost for the first time. That caused a lot of domestic concern in Canada, which basically required that the NAFO treaty should be changed.

In September 2005, the contracting parties agreed to begin the task of reforming NAFO with an EU-Canadian ad hoc working group, chaired by the EU as a result of growing pressure from Canada to reform NAFO. In 2006, the working group came out with its first draft proposals based on the North East Atlantic Fisheries Commission (NEAFC). The proposed treaty gave much more power to the distant water fleet states than the 1979 NAFO treaty. Some of the first drafts also gave NAFO the right to regulate fisheries within Canada's EEZ. The draft proposals also changed the voting procedures so that a two-thirds vote had to be present. However, it also changed the objection procedure that had made it possible for the EU to claim that Canada had broken international law when the EU objected to the turbot quota allocated to the EU in 1995, and Canada seized Estai. The new amendments were presented in September 2007 and went into force in May 2017, after two thirds of the contracting parties had ratified the agreement.

== See also ==
- 1993 Cherbourg incident
- Cod Wars
- Lobster War
- Peanut Hole
- Canada–Spain relations
