= Pendulum appliance =

A pendulum or pendulum appliance is an orthodontic appliance developed by James J. Hilgers in 1992, that use forces to distalize the upper 1st molars to create space for eruption of impacted teeth or allowing correction of Class 2 malocclusion. This appliance is a fixed type of distalizing appliance that does not depend on the compliance of each patient to work. Hilgers published an article in Journal of Clinical Orthodontics in 1992 describing the appliance.

== Management ==
The initial design of the appliance used the occlusal rests which were bonded to the premolars for retention. However, premolars can also be banded for the retention purposes. Pre-activation of the appliance mandates bending of the TMA springs 90 degrees or parallel to the midline of the palate. Then once the appliance is in the mouth, the springs are inserted into the lingual sheaths of the molar bands to allow the force distally and medially. The patient then presents every 3 weeks for the re-adjustment of the springs.

As the molar moves distally, forces of the spring cause the molar to move in an arc towards the middle of the palate. Therefore, this can lead to crossbite in the posterior teeth. In order to avoid this side-effect, the adjustment loops are opened to counteract this medial movement of 1st molars.

== Treatment effects ==
A study published by Ghosh et al. in 1996 stated that the mean maxillary first molar distalization was 3.37 mm, with a distal tipping of 8.36° and the mean reciprocal mesial movement of the first premolar was 2.55 mm, with a mesial tipping of 1.29°. They also stated that the eruption of maxillary second molars had minimal effect on distalization of first molars. In addition, the reported increase of Lower Anterior Facial Height for patient's who had pre-existing vertical growth. They concluded that the pendulum appliance was an effective and reliable method for distalizing maxillary molars. Another study done by Bussick et al. looked at effects of pendulum appliance on 101 patients. These authors reported a slight higher distalization of maxillary first molar by 5.7 mm and a distal tipping of 10.6°. The also reported anchorage loss when the anterior teeth moved mesially by the 1.8-mm anterior movement of the upper first premolars, with a mesial tipping of 1.5°. Both the abovementioned studies, observed slight maxillary first molars intruded and slight first premolars extrusion. This study also saw increase of lower anterior facial height by 2.2 mm but they found no significant difference in lower anterior facial height increase between patients of high, neutral, or low mandibular plane angles.

== Components ==
- Nancy Acrylic Button
- TMA Springs (0.032 in)
- Wire component includes closed helix, small horizontal loop and a wire connecting to bands on 1st molar and 2nd premolar.

== Pendex ==
Pendex is an appliance, similar to Pendulum, which is known to correct the transverse deficiency of maxillary teeth in addition to distalizing the upper molars. This appliance includes the expansion screw.
