= Cape Roger =

Peninsula in Newfoundland and Labrador, Canada

Coordinates: 47°21′20″N 54°44′08″W

Location of Cape Roger in Newfoundland

Cape Roger is a headland located on the south coast of Newfoundland in the Canadian province of Newfoundland and Labrador.

Cape Roger extends into Placentia Bay from the eastern shore of the Burin Peninsula. It is bounded on the west by Cape Roger Bay and on the east by Nonsuch Inlet.
