= Elisabeth Bristol Greenleaf =

American collector of folk songs

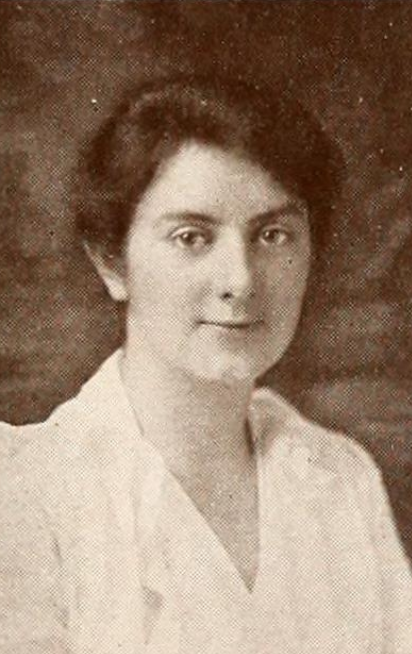
- Born: Elisabeth Bristol; 1895; New York, U.S.
- Died: 1980 (aged 84–85); Westerly, Rhode Island, U.S.
- Education: Vassar College (1917)
- Occupation: Folklorist

Elisabeth Bristol Greenleaf (1895–1980) was an American collector of folk songs. She was among the first people to collect both the words and the music of the folk songs of Newfoundland, and (together with the musicologist Grace Yarrow Mansfield) compiled the definitive collection of them.

== Early life and education ==
Elisabeth Bristol was born in New York, the daughter of Charles Lawrence Bristol and Ellen Gallup Bristol. Her mother was a teacher, and her father was a zoology professor at New York University. She graduated Phi Beta Kappa from Vassar College in 1917.

== Career ==
After college, Bristol worked for the Food Administration from 1917 to 1918. In 1920 she volunteered to teach for the Grenfell Mission summer school at Sally's Cove, near Bonne Bay on the west coast of Newfoundland. There she heard traditional singing for the first time and began to write down the songs she heard. In 1921 she returned to Newfoundland to teach for a summer, and again in 1929 with a musicologist, Grace Yarrow Mansfield, as part of the Vassar College Folklore Expedition to Newfoundland.

They made an extensive collection of folk songs and tunes, published in 1933 by Harvard University Press as Ballads and Sea Songs of Newfoundland. "This was the first scholarly publication of a collection of Newfoundland folk songs and one of the first North American collections to give the tunes equal emphasis with the texts." The book, reprinted in 1968, remains a definitive source of the songs of Newfoundland.

Greenleaf spoke to campus and community groups about Newfoundland folk music. In her later years, she welcomed young musicians and singers including Pete Seeger and Janis Ian to her home in Westerly, Rhode Island, to learn the songs she collected.

== Publications ==
- Ballads and Sea Songs of Newfoundland (1933, with Grace Yarrow Mansfield)

== Personal life ==
Bristol married biology professor William Eben Greenleaf in 1921. They had a son, Robert William Greenleaf. Her husband died in 1959, and she died in 1980, in her eighties, in Rhode Island. Her grandson Christopher Marmon Greenleaf is artistic advisor for a music series.
