= CCGS Sir Wilfred Grenfell =

Canadian Coast Guard vessel

- Sir Wilfred Grenfell during spring refit and maintenance, March 2008, St. John's, Newfoundland, Canada

History

Canada
- Name: Sir Wilfred Grenfell
- Namesake: Sir Wilfred Grenfell
- Operator: Canadian Coast Guard
- Port of registry: Ottawa, Ontario
- Builder: Marystown Shipyard Limited, Marystown, Newfoundland and Labrador
- Launched: 1985
- Commissioned: December 1987
- In service: 1987–present
- Home port: CCG Base Victoria – British Columbia Region
- Identification: CGJY; IMO number: 8415495
- Status: in active service

General characteristics
- Type: Offshore supply and search and rescue vessel
- Tonnage: 2,404 GT; 664.5 NT
- Displacement: 3,753 long tons (3,813 t) full load
- Length: 68.5 m (224 ft 9 in)
- Beam: 15 m (49 ft 3 in)
- Draught: 5 m (16 ft 5 in)
- Propulsion: 4 × Deutz diesel engines; 2 shaft, controllable-pitch propellers; 12,862 hp (9,591 kW)
- Speed: 16 knots (30 km/h)
- Range: 11,000 nmi (20,000 km) at 14 knots (26 km/h)
- Endurance: 35 days
- Complement: 20

CCGS Sir Wilfred Grenfell (Note: CCGS stands for Canadian Coast Guard Ship) is a Canadian Coast Guard vessel based in Victoria, British Columbia. Designated an "Offshore Ice Strengthened Multi Patrol Vessel", the former offshore supply vessel is named after the medical missionary in Labrador, Sir Wilfred Grenfell. Constructed in 1984–1985, Sir Wilfred Grenfell was purchased by the Canadian Government and converted for Coast Guard service. In 1994, she played an important role in the fishing conflict known as the Turbot War in the Atlantic Ocean.

== Design and description ==
The ship is 68.5 m (224 ft 9 in) long overall with a beam of 15 m (49 ft 3 in) and a draught of 5 m (16 ft 5 in). The vessel has a fully loaded displacement of 3,753 long tons (3,813 t) and a 2,404 gross tonnage (GT) and 664.5 net tonnage (NT). The hull has been ice-strengthened. The ship is incapable of operating aircraft.

Sir Wilfred Grenfell is powered by four Deutz 4SA diesel engines, two 16-cylinder and two 9-cylinder models, driving two shafts with controllable-pitch propellers. This creates 12,682 horsepower (9,457 kW) giving the vessel a maximum speed of 16 knots (30 km/h). The supply vessel has capacity for 879.70 m^{3} (193,510 imp gal) of diesel fuel, giving the ship a range of 11,000 nautical miles (20,000 km) at 11 knots (20 km/h). The ship has a complement of 20 with 9 officers and 11 crew and 16 spare berths. The ship carries an 85-ton towing winch.

== Service history ==
In the Fleet Capital Investment Plan of 1978, the Canadian Coast Guard intended to order corvette-type lightly-armed patrol vessels to combine search and rescue, sovereignty and fisheries patrol duties to one vessel. However, the Coast Guard abandoned the project and instead sought to acquire more ships of the offshore supply type. The vessel was constructed by Marystown Shipyard Ltd., at Marystown, Newfoundland and Labrador in 1984–1985 with the yard number 37. The ship was taken over during construction by the Canadian Coast Guard and converted to a search and rescue vessel. The ship was launched in 1985. Named for a medical missionary to Labrador, the ship entered Coast Guard service in December 1987, replacing CCGS Grenfell. The ship is registered in Ottawa, Ontario and was initially home ported at St. John's, Newfoundland and Labrador. The vessel was later re-based to Victoria, British Columbia, serving the Western Region.

On 7/8 December 1989, two merchant vessels, Capitaine Torres and Johanna B, sent distress signals during a storm off the coast of Canada in the Gulf of St. Lawrence. Sir Wilfred Grenfell was dispatched to aid Capitaine Torres but by the time the ship had arrived, the merchant had sunk and the crew of 18 were lost due to the poor visibility and high seas during the storm. The Coast Guard ship spent the following day searching for survivors, finding only two empty life rafts.

In 1993, the Sea Shepherd Conservation Society's vessel Cleveland Amory was chased and apprehended by Sir Wilfred Grenfell and CCGS Cape Roger with Royal Canadian Mounted Police detachments aboard for harassing the Cuban fishing trawler Rio Los Casas on the Grand Banks. Cleveland Amory was sold in order to pay the fines. In June 1994, Canadian law changed with the Coastal Fisheries Protection Act that gave Canada the right to manage fish stocks within 200 nautical miles (370 km) of the coast. The same year, the Atlantic Fisheries Organization had awarded Canada 70% of the turbot catch. Neither action was recognized by the European Union. In what became known as the Turbot War, European fishing trawlers continued to fish on the Grand Banks in defiance of Canadian and international law. Sir Wilfred Grenfell was among the Coast Guard and Department of Fisheries and Oceans vessels monitoring them. On 9 March 1995, in concert with other Canadian vessels, Sir Wilfred Grenfell moved in to cut the nets belonging to the Spanish trawler Estai while holding off the other European fishing vessels with her water cannon. Sir Wilfred Grenfell successfully executed the move, and the net was later recovered and demonstrated the illegality of the European's vessel fishing tactics. Estai was later detained.

On 1 January 1994, a signal indicating a ship, the 81,000 GRT Marika, had sunk in the mid-Atlantic was received by the Coast Guard at Halifax, Nova Scotia. The Coast Guard and Canadian Forces were mobilized and Sir Wilfred Grenfell was dispatched, and assumed control of the search upon arrival. Only debris and empty life rafts were found of the ship. The search and rescue efforts lasted for five days before being called off.

Sir Wilfred Grenfell collided with the fishing trawler Genny and Doug on 3 May 2003 in thick fog. Sir Wilfred Grenfell had been entering St. John's harbour and the fishing vessel was exiting when they collided 1.5 nautical miles (2.8 km) northeast of the harbour entrance. The Coast Guard vessel suffered minor damage, but Genny and Doug received significant damage to her port side hull and wheelhouse. Both vessels returned to St. John's following the collision.

Allied Shipbuilders Ltd., located in North Vancouver, British Columbia, was awarded a contract on 17 February 2021 to refit and convert Sir Winfred Grenfell into a buoy tender with search and rescue capabilities as part of the National Shipbuilding Strategy. Work on the refit commenced in February.

== In popular culture ==
- In the novel World War Z, by Max Brooks, ex-Sir Wilfred Grenfell has been decommissioned and is at Alang, India awaiting scrapping. The still functioning ship is used to rescue people escaping from the zombie hordes.
