= Resolution (ship) =

Numerous ships have been named Resolution.

- Resolution (1769 EIC ship) - East Indiaman of 836 tons (bm) that made four voyages for the British East India Company (EIC) before being broken up in 1785
- Resolution (1779 ship) was launched at Liverpool as the West Indiaman Thomas Hall; she was renamed in 1779. Then between 1791 and 1804 Resolution made some six voyages as a whaler in the British southern whale fishery. On one voyage, in 1793, a French frigate captured her, but Resolution was re-captured. In 1804 a new owner returned her to the West Indies trade. She does not appear to have sailed, at least under that name, after early 1805.
- Resolution (1793 ship) - built, launched, and captured in America in 1793
- Resolution (1793 privateer) was a lugger operating out of Guernsey. She made several captures, most notably of the French East Indiaman St.Jean de Lone.
- Resolution (1802 ship) was a brig of 128 tons (bm) launched in Spain in 1800. She was taken in prize and sold in 1802 for service as a Moravian Church mission ship. She served in that role until late 1808 and then was sold. She was wrecked on the coast of Africa in 1810 but was still listed in Lloyd's Register, with stale data, through 1814.

== See also ==
- HMS Resolution
