= Nutak =

- Location of Nutak in the province
- Country: Canada
- Province: Newfoundland and Labrador

Population
  - Estimate (1956): 200

Nutak was an Inuit settlement in Newfoundland and Labrador, Canada, in what is now the Nunatsiavut region of the province. It was established in 1919 by Moravian missionaries, and was closed in 1956 when the Government of Newfoundland and Labrador forcibly resettled its people.

A crater on Mars was named after Nutak in 1976.

== History ==
Nutak was established in 1919 by Moravian missionaries, shortly after the abandonment of the nearby settlement of Okak the previous year due to Spanish influenza. Many of the surviving residents of Okak came to Nutak.

From 1926 to 1942, the Hudson's Bay Company operated a fur trade post at Nutak in buildings leased from the Moravians.

In 1948, the Innu people of Davis Inlet were forcibly relocated to Nutak, which was outside of their traditional caribou hunting grounds; they had returned to Davis Inlet by 1949.

In 1956, the roughly 200 residents of Nutak were forcibly resettled by the Government of Newfoundland and Labrador to other communities in Labrador, including Nain, Hopedale, and North West River. Some of the resettled people moved to Hebron and were subsequently forcibly resettled again in 1959.

An official apology for the relocations was issued by Newfoundland and Labrador Premier Danny Williams in 2005; the government of the autonomous region of Nunatsiavut arranged for a reunion of the displaced people in 2012 and erected a monument listing their names at the former site of the settlement.

== Notable people ==
- Johannes Lampe
- Jim Lyall (politician)
- Samuel Metcalfe
