= Samuel Metcalfe =

Linguist from Northern Labrador

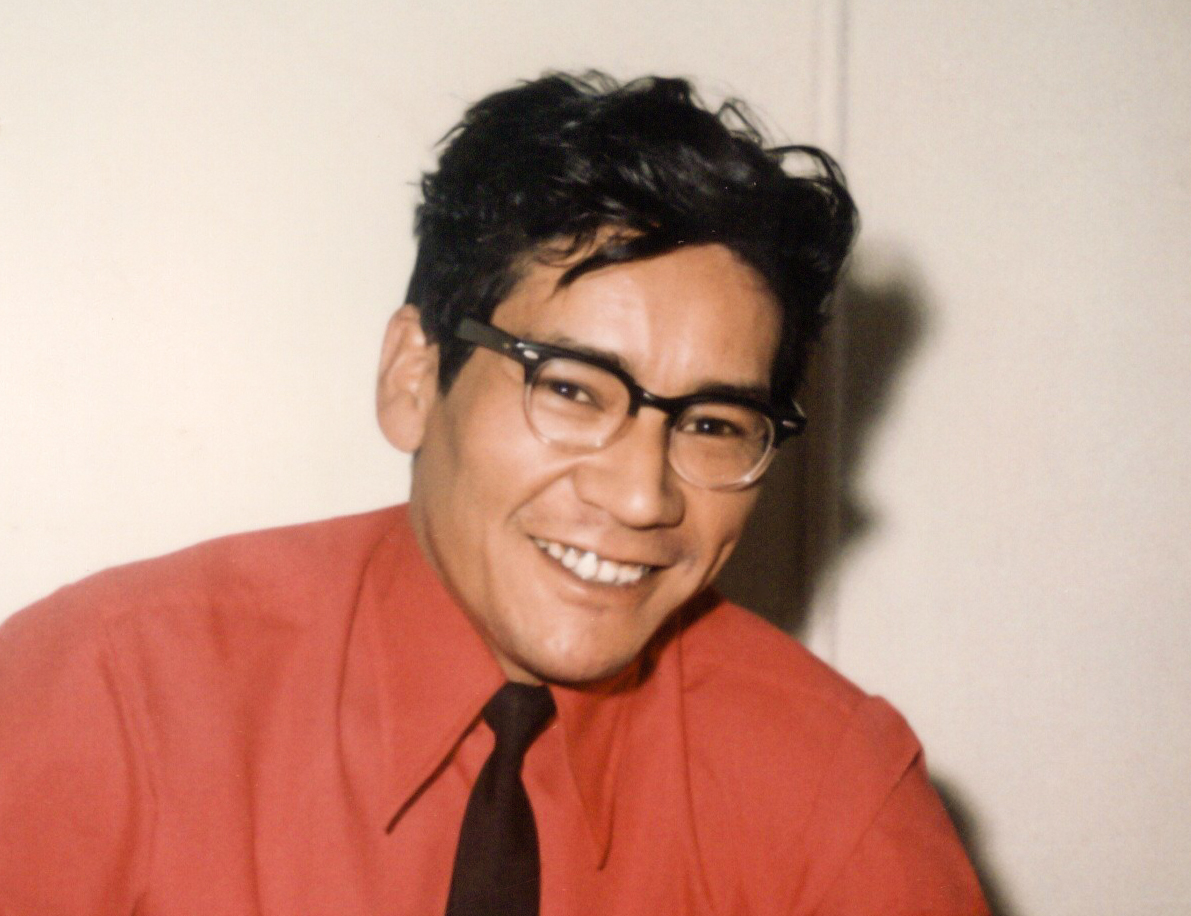
- Born: April 16, 1939; Hebron, Nunatsiavut
- Died: October 11, 2000 (aged 61); Cornwallis Park, Nova Scotia, Canada
- Resting place: Clementsport, Nova Scotia, Canada
- Occupations: Inuktitut linguist, translator, teacher, researcher, carver

Samuel (Sam) Ephriam Metcalfe (April 16, 1939 – October 11, 2000) was an Inuk from Northern Labrador, Canada. A survivor of the Canadian Indian residential school system, Metcalfe was part of the first generation of Labrador Inuit who fought to regain their culture and to obtain self-determination and self-government. Metcalfe contributed much to the development of Inuktitut as a teacher and a researcher and more specifically, to preserving Inuttitut, the Labrador Inuit dialect.

== The early years ==
Metcalfe was born in Hebron, Nunatsiavut on April 16, 1939, only son of William Metcalfe and Benigna Metcalfe (nee Merkuratsuk). Metcalfe had three sisters: Alice, Mary and Elsie. In 1949, at age 10, following the death of the mother, the family moved from Hebron to Nutak.

Metcalfe was educated at the Moravian mission school in Nain and completed his secondary education at North West River. Both schools, the Nain Boarding School and Yale School (North West River) appearing on the List of Indian residential schools in Canada, Metcalfe was therefore a survivor of Canadian Indian residential school system created by the Canadian Government to isolate Indigenous children from the influence of their own culture and religion in order to assimilate them into the dominant Euro-Canadian culture.

His working career started as a carpenter in North West River where he worked for the Moravian Mission as well as for the Hudson’s Bay Company.

In 1960, Metcalfe was diagnosed with tuberculosis and sent to the Grenfell Mission in St. Anthony for almost one year.

No longer being able to do heavy carpentry work, Metcalfe completed an 8-month course at the Vocational Training Institute in St. John’s, NL in commercial subjects. He learned bookkeeping, typing and acquired skills that he would put to good use throughout his working life.

During the late 1960s and early 1970s, Metcalfe ran the Newfoundland Government store in Hopedale, was hired for contracts at CFB Goose Bay and in a mine at Wabush, and set up his own small convenience store that he ran out of his home in Nain.

== Commitment to the Labrador Inuit Self-Determination and Self-Government ==
Metcalfe’s interest in Labrador Inuit politics started when he was in his early thirties. In 1971, he was the first elected chairman of the community council (mayor) of Nain. In July of that year, he was elected community council representative of the Newfoundland and Labrador Federation of Municipalities.

The following year, in 1972, Metcalfe was appointed to the Northern Newfoundland and Labrador Transportation Committee. The 11-member committee examined coastal boat operations, ferry services and recommended improvements aimed at ameliorating passenger and freight service.

Metcalfe was an active member of the Labrador Inuit Association (LIA), an association formed in 1973 and officially recognized on March 26, 1975. Its mission was to promote/protect the Inuit culture, language, and traditional lands and to assist with land claims negotiations. Unfortunately, Metcalfe didn’t live to see their land claims successfully leading to the formation of the Government of Nunatsiavut in 2005. But, in March 2018, Honorable Edward-Blake Rudkowski, Speaker of the Nunatsiavut Assembly, gave a testimonial in front of the Assembly confirming Metcalfe’s contribution to the creation of Nunatsiavut. On March 6, 2018, when Metcalfe’s grandson, Gregory Langille, was invited to act as a legislative page at one of the session of the Nunatsiavut Assembly, Rudkowski introduced Langille as follows:

“Greg Langille joins us from Ottawa. Many people don't know Greg, but many people do know his grandfather who was a very significant figure in the formation of this very Assembly building, Mr. Sam Metcalfe. And I'm sure if Mr. Metcalfe was here today, he would be heartened to see his grandson is serving in the building that he worked diligently to establish.”

In 1997, Metcalfe was the only Inuk to serve on a five-member environmental assessment panel established to evaluate the impacts of mining in the Voisey's Bay area of Labrador where he emphasized the Inuit perspective in the panel's deliberations.

== Commitment to the Inuttitut Language and Labrador Inuit Culture ==
In the 1970s, Metcalfe was one of the very committed Labrador Inuttitut speakers who contributed to Rose Jeddore’s Labrador Dictionary, considered to be the first Canadian, perhaps North American, Inuktitut dictionary produced by Inuit alone. Along with Dr. Lawrence R. Smith and Jeddore, Metcalfe worked to devise a new writing system referred to as the “Inuit common writing system.”

In 1973-1974, Metcalfe contributed to the Royal Commission on Labrador by translating letters (Inuttitut-English).

In 1974, Metcalfe moved to St. John’s where he enrolled at Memorial University of Newfoundland to study linguistics and to learn German.

In St. John’s, Metcalfe assisted Dr. Lawrence R. Smith with linguistic research at Memorial University. After a stint with the National Anti-Poverty Organization in Newfoundland, Metcalfe moved to Ottawa in 1978 and soon found a position in the Culture and Linguistics section at the Department of Indian and Northern Affairs, beginning what turned out to be the longest period of continuous employment in his career. He worked with the Department until 1987 when he transferred to the Secretary of State's Citizenship Directorate where he remained until his early retirement in 1991.

In 1974, in order to standardize the Inuktitut writing system, the Inuit Language Commission proposed changes to written forms of Inuktitut all across the Canadian North. Following concerns expressed about planned changes to the syllabic writing systems, Metcalfe wrote a letter to the editor of Atuaqnik newspaper to provide an historical perspective of the development of the Inuktitut written language and to express his opinion:

I am gravely concerned about the retention of my native language, both through the spoken and the written form. If we are going to keep fighting among ourselves and keep on refusing to accept modifications to the writing systems, we are never going to learn to understand and be able to communicate with each other's more than 20 different Inuktitut dialects which exist throughout this world, leave alone attempting to come up with a common system for the six regions in Canada (Baffin, Keewatin, Western Arctic, Central Arctic, Northern Quebec and Northern Labrador). If we keep on refusing to learn each other's writing systems and be unwilling to accept modifications, we have only the worst to fear. … I know it will take time, but I feel that we have to begin teaching a standard to our children in schools if we want to prolong the use of our native language. … We are not talking about CHANGING the language, all we are talking about is a simple MODIFICATION to the two writing systems so that our children, and future generations, will be able to communicate with each other by using a standard system.”

During his years with the Canadian Federal Government, Metcalfe contributed to a great variety of activities and projects involving Inuit language and culture. He worked on Inuktitut dictionaries, translated texts, organized specialized terminology conferences for Inuit translators and interpreters, developed Inuktitut teaching materials, and taught Inuktitut courses. He also managed a number of government programs in support of Inuit culture. Namely, the Department of Indian and Northern Affairs’ Cultural Grant for Inuit Culture.

Metcalfe was a visiting professor at the University of Ottawa where he taught a beginners’ course in Inuktitut to students in the Linguistics program. He had previously been a teacher and tutor of Inuktitut at the Memorial University of Newfoundland’s Linguistics Department.

In 1979, as one of the two representatives from Labrador at the Interpreter’s Word Conference, Metcalfe was elected chairman of the standing committee. The following year, the standing committee was replaced by an unofficial body, the Inuit Interpreters and Translators Association of Canada (IITAC). Metcalfe was selected as Vice-President of IITTAC.

Speaking at the 1983 Convention of the Association of Translators and Interpreters of Ontario (ATIO), Metcalfe, then Senior Communicator from the Department of Indian and Northern Affairs, said that the Inuit interpreters' challenge will be to help bridge the communication gap given that some 25,000 Inuit speak 20 different dialects and use two different writing systems. In every Inuit village there are five language groups, ranging from the very old who are unilingual Inuit, through the various generations to the children, who are unilingual English. He ended by “you thought bilingualism was complex!".

In 1988, Metcalfe attended the 6th Inuit Studies Conference at Copenhagen, Denmark, where he chaired a workshop on Inuit Literature. He therefore contributed in a conference which had significant implications for the study of Inuit and Yupik languages/dialects and for establishing contact with the speakers of these languages in the Russian Arctic. Indeed, the 1988 Inuit Studies Conference was the first one attended by Russian Eskimologists namely Chukchi author Yuri Rytkheu.

Along with Nat Igloliorte, Metcalfe translated the National Film Board documentary The Last Days of Okak from English to Inuttitut and he recorded the Inuttitut narration at the Canadian Broadcasting Corporation studios in Goose Bay.

Metcalfe was a member of the editorial team for Inuit Tapiriit Kanatami’s (ITK) Inuktitut Magazine. From issue 49 (December 1981) to issue 65 (winter 1987) his name appears on the inside of the cover as staff member. He wrote several stories for the magazine based on his life experiences.

== A Gift to Queen Elizabeth II ==
Metcalfe was also a highly skilled, largely self-taught woodworker cabinetmaker who could turn out beautifully carved representations of Labrador Life. On October 17, 1977, during Queen Elizabeth’s silver jubilee visit to Ottawa, Metcalfe was invited to lunch with the Queen and to present her with one of his wood carvings: the winter camp of an Inuk hunter. Following the 1992 Windsor Castle fire, a fundraising event was held at Buckingham Palace. One of the rooms opened to the public featured Metcalfe’s 1977 Canadian Eskimo carving.

== Publications ==
=== Books authored by Sam Metcalfe ===
- Metcalfe, Sam. Inuvia Hebronime. North West River: Curriculum Centre – Labrador East Integrated School Board, 1981. Edited by Beatrice Watts. Illustrations by Libby Anderson. (Inuktitut version of Christmas in the Big Igloo.)

=== Publications that benefited from Sam Metcalfe’s contribution ===
TITLE	METCALFE'S ROLE
Jeddore, Rose, ed. Labrador Inuit uqausingit. Memorial University of Newfoundland. Department of Education, 1976.	Metcalfe was one of the very committed Labrador Inuttitut speakers who contributed to Rose Jeddore’s Labrador Dictionary. The group worked to devise a new writing system referred to as the “Inuit common writing system.”
Fortescue, Michael. A comparative Manual of Affixes for the Inuit Dialects of Greenland, Canada, and Alaska. Copenhagen: Nyt Nordisk Forlag, 1983. ISBN 9788717029651	Inuktitut words and their English translations from Metcalfe’s article “Christmas Time in Northern Labrador” published in Inuktitut Magazine (Winter 1978) were reproduced in this book.
Dorais, Louis-Jacques. An Analytical Lexicon of Modern Inuktitut in Quebec-Labrador. Quebec City: Les Presses de l’Université Laval, 1983. ISBN 9782763770154	As part of his role at the Cultural and Linguistic Section of the Department of Indian and Northern Affairs Canada, Metcalfe provided guidance for the publication of the English version. (See page xii of the book.)
Kalleo, Josephina. Taipsumane: A collection of Labrador Stories. Nain: Torngâsok Cultural Centre, 1984.ISBN 9780969118404	As part of his role at the Cultural and Linguistic Section of the Department of Indian and Northern Affairs Canada, Metcalfe arranged for the syllabics typesetting. (See the book’s Foreword.)
Schneider, Lucien and Dermot Collis. Ulirnaisigutiit: An Inuktitut-English Dictionary of Northern Quebec, Labrador and Eastern Arctic Dialects (with an English-Inuktitut Index). Quebec City: Les Presses de l’Université Laval, 1985. ISBN 9782763770659	Metcalfe undertook the final proofreading of the Inuktitut text and provided advice and encouragement throughout the project. (See the book’s Introduction, page viii.)
Maggo, Paulus. Remembering the Years of my Life: Journeys of a Labrador Inuit Hunter. St. John’s: ISER Books, 1999. Edited by Carol Brice-Bennett.	Metcalfe translated the text from Inuttitut to English.
How the North was lost. Hebron and Nutak Remembered in Kinatuinamut Ilingajuk Special Issue Fall 1999. Nain: OKâlaKatiget Society, 1999.	Metcalfe was one of the many individuals who contributed their knowledge, materials and time to the creation of this special issue of the magazine.

=== Articles written by Sam Metcalfe for Inuktitut Magazine ===
TITLE	ISSUE NO	PAGE NO
Christmas Time in Northern Labrador	Winter 1978 (French & Inuktitut versions) Text was reproduced in Christmas in the Big Igloo: True Tales from the Canadian Arctic. Yellowknife, Outcrop, 1983. Directed by Kenn Harper. Pages 20–23. Sam also recorded his text as a CBC broadcast.	Pages 15–23
Christmas Time in Northern Labrador	Spring 1980 (English & Inuktitut versions)	Pages 81–91
Given up as lost	Issue 49 (December 1981) Story was also reproduced in the book Labrador Studies: The Labrador Inuit by Tim Borlase. Labrador East Integrated School Board, 1993. ISBN 9781896108001.	Pages 13–16
First Inuk Hockey Player?	Issue 51 (January 1983)	Pages 69–71 (Sam being the author is confirmed in the Editorial section, p. 4)
Warm and comfortable in the cold	Issue 51 (January 1983)	Pages 74–80
Inuktitut Asks Sam Raddi about Inuvialuit in the Western Arctic	Issue 53 (September 1983)	Pages 9–23
James Kavana Speaks	Issue 53 (September 1983)	Pages 24–33
Wooding	Issue 56 (July 1984) Article was reproduced in the book Northern Voices by Penny Petrone. University of Toronto Press, 1988. ISBN 9780802077172	Pages 44–48
Basking Seal	Issue 58 (Winter 1984) Story was also reproduced in the book Labrador Studies: The Labrador Inuit by Tim Borlase. Labrador East Integrated School Board, 1993. ISBN 9781896108001.	Pages 57–59
The Good Hunter	Issue 67 (Summer 1987)	Pages 35–38

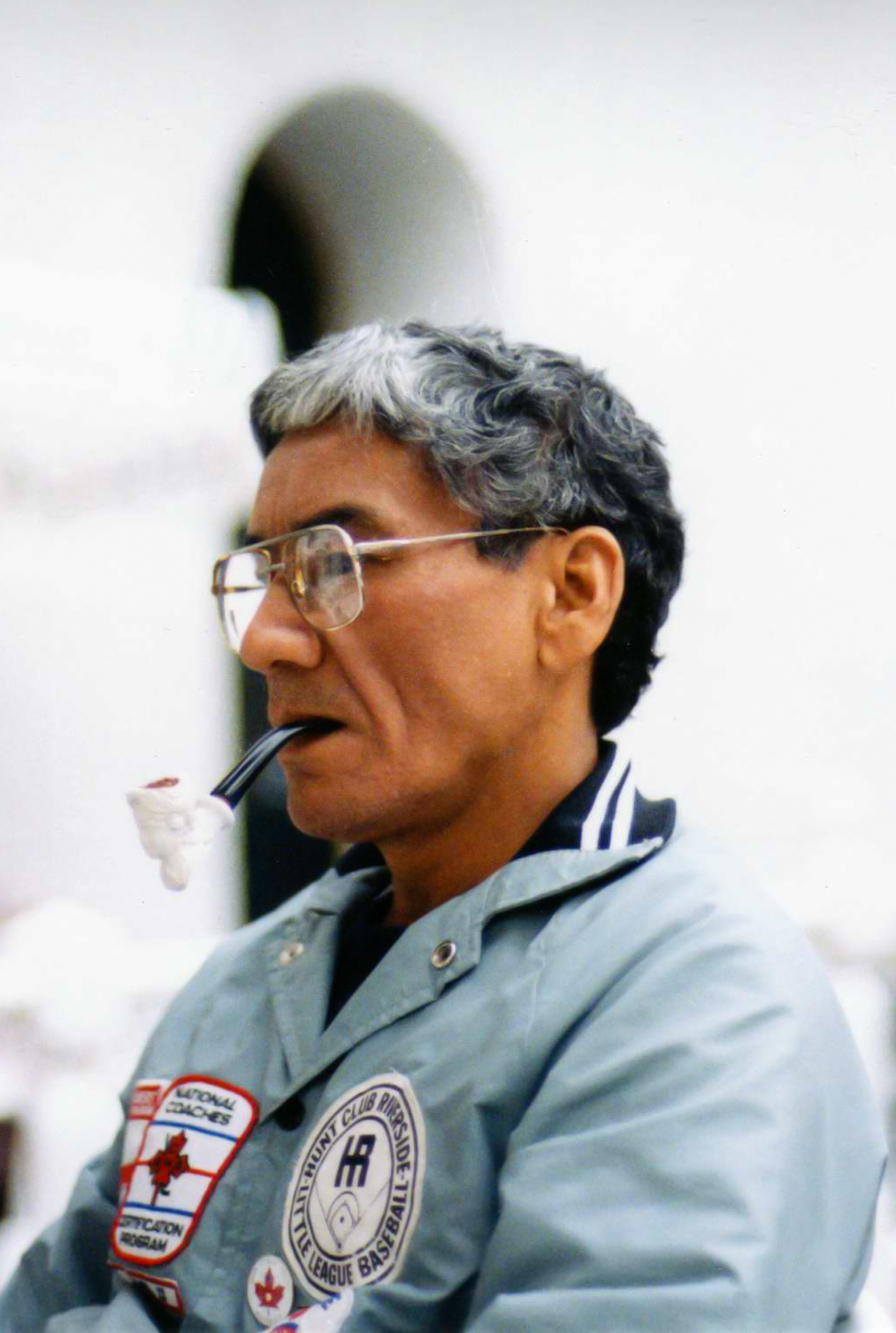
Samuel Metcalfe wearing a jacket with his Little League Baseball and Hockey Coaches Certification Program patches.

== Community Involvement ==
Metcalfe was involved in a range of voluntary work with baseball and ice hockey associations for children, and sports for the physically and mentally handicapped.

His passion for hockey started in his youth, during his years at the boarding school in North West River where their rink was a pond. The boards were snow banks and the net was two tin cans. He was most happy when his children decided to play hockey. The family's weekends were planned around hockey games and practices. For Sam, the most important was that his family was spending time together. Sam was involved in ice hockey at every possible level including running the arena's canteen.

In 1980, the Metcalfe family welcomed a 13-year-old boy from Frobisher Bay (Iqaluit), who was invited by a National Hockey League scout to attend the Ottawa 67's Summer Hockey School.

Metcalfe also contributed his time to Little League Baseball and got to umpire at the Little League World Championships in Williamsport, Pennsylvania.

== See also ==
- List of people of Newfoundland and Labrador
