= Moravian Church Mission Ships =

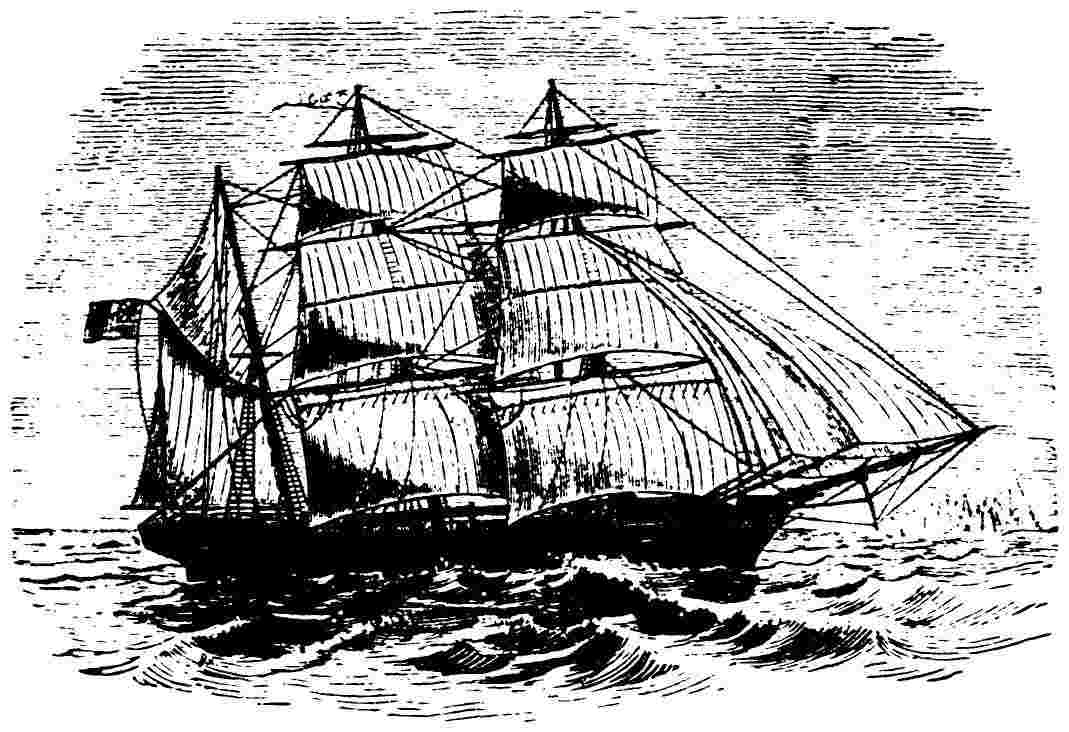
Etching of the Moravian Church mission ship Harmony #4 c1888 from With the Harmony to Labrador by the Rev. B. La Trobe.

The Moravian Church Mission Ships were a series of twelve ships (five named Harmony) that made an annual voyage from London to the Moravian Church mission stations in Labrador every summer for the 156 years between 1770 and 1926. The purpose of the voyages was to supply provisions to the church's mission stations in Labrador and to rotate mission personnel. All but one were pure sailing vessels; the final ship, Harmony #5, had an auxiliary steam engine.

== Ownership ==
The ships were owned and operated by the Brethren's Society for the Furtherance of the Gospel among the Heathen, apparently a joint venture between the Moravian Church (the Unity of the Brethren) and the Society for the Furtherance of the Gospel among the Heathen.

== Destinations ==
The mission stations during the time of the ships were Nain (established 1770), Okak (1776), Hopedale (1782), Hebron at Kauerdluksoak Bay (1830–1959) serving also Napartok Bay and Saeglek Bay, Zoar (1864–1889), Ramah (1871–1908), Makkovik (1896), and Killiniq on Cape Chidley island (1905–1925). Two further stations were added after this period at Happy Valley near Goose Bay (1957) and North West River (1960).

== The ships ==
Ship's Name	From	To	Captain	Notes
Jersey Packet	1770	1770	Thomas Mugford	A small sloop of 80 tons (bm).
Amity	1771	1776	Francis Mugford	
Good Intent	1777	1779	Francis Mugford	Sloop of 70 tons (bm). Captured by a French privateer on her return voyage during Autumn 1778 but recaptured by a British cruiser before she could reach a French port. This incident led to passes being issued by both the King of France and Benjamin Franklin to prevent recurrence.
Amity	1780; 1782	1781; 1786	Francis Mugford; James Fraser	
Harmony #1	1787	1802	James Fraser 1787‑?	Brig of 133 tons built for the Society specifically for arctic service at Bursledon under the supervision of Thomas Mitchell, a deputy surveyor of the Royal Navy.
Resolution	1802	1808	J Fraser	
Hector	1809	1809	Fraser	Owned by the society for less than two months.
Jemima	1810	1817	Fraser	Brig of 180 tons (bm).
Harmony #2	1818	1831	Fraser	Brig of 126 tons (bm) built for the Society specifically for arctic service under the supervision of Brother Taylor. In 1830 she was accompanied by the Oliver, chartered to convey additional stores needed to establish the Hebron mission; similarly in 1831, the Venus.
Harmony #3	1832	1860	William Taylor; 1832‑at least 1836 James Sutherland	Snow of about 230 tons (bm) built for the Society by Fellows and Sons of Great Yarmouth specifically for arctic service during Autumn and Winter 1831/1832 under the supervision of Brother Taylor at a cost of about £3,500 (about £338,801 at current prices). During the outbound voyage of 1836 she was caught in ice for eight days while approaching Labrador towards the end of July. During the return voyage the same year she rescued nine survivors from Superior which, under Captain Dunn, had been thrown on her beam ends during a furious gale on 28 September 1836 bound from Miramichi to Cardiff. The Harmony had herself been damaged in the same gale when a heavy sea breaking over her carried away the skiff hanging astern, stove in the cabin windows and swamped it, washed away the binnacle and the cook house, broke the wheel and nearly killed the man at it. Following this voyage she was strengthened by doubling i.e. adding a second layer of planking over the bows at a cost of about £350.
Harmony #4	1861	1896	John White ‑1862 Henry Linklater 1863‑	A barque of 251 tons register built for the Society by Fellows and Sons of Great Yarmouth specifically for arctic service and launched on 24 April 1861.
No Moravian ships	1896	1900		The Society chartered a vessel to supply the mission stations during these years.
Harmony #5	1901	1926	Joseph Linklater 1901; J C Jackson 1902‑1926	Ex steamship Lorna Doone (originally a barque built at Dundee in 1876 for expedition work) bought for £2,000 and re-rigged by the Society for a further £2,000 as a barque with auxiliary steam power.

== Spanish flu ==
In the summer of 1919, SS Harmony #5 carried Spanish flu from St John's to Hebron and Okak. The resulting deaths cut the population of Hebron and the surrounding area from 220 to 70. In Okak 204 of the 263 residents died, including every adult male Inuit; the survivors dismantled the community entirely, burning all houses and furniture before moving to Nain, Hopedale or Hebron.
