= List of historic places in Labrador =

This article is a list of historic places in Labrador entered on the Canadian Register of Historic Places, whether they are federal, provincial, or municipal.

== List of historic places ==
Name	Address	Coordinates	Government recognition (CRHP №)	Wikidata ID	Image
L'Anse Amour National Historic Site of Canada	On the road to Point Amour; L'Anse-Amour NL	51°28′49″N 56°51′59″W	Federal (14130)		
Battle Harbour Historic District National Historic Site of Canada	Battle Harbour NL	52°16′26″N 55°35′07″W	Federal (3453)		
Building 1081	CFB Goose Bay; Happy Valley-Goose Bay NL	53°17′42″N 60°22′34″W	Federal (10648)		
Building 1082	CFB Goose Bay; Happy Valley-Goose Bay NL	53°17′43″N 60°22′34″W	Federal (10651)		
Building 1090	CFB Goose Bay; Happy Valley-Goose Bay NL	53°17′42″N 60°22′34″W	Federal (10709)		
Bunkhouse/Cookhouse Registered Heritage Structure	Battle Harbour NL	52°15′38″N 55°36′00″W	Newfoundland and Labrador (10844)		
Flour Store Registered Historic Structure	Battle Harbour NL	52°16′28″N 55°35′10″W	Newfoundland and Labrador (19764)		Upload Photo
Grenfell Cottage Registered Heritage Structure	Battle Harbour NL	52°15′39″N 55°36′00″W	Newfoundland and Labrador (10846)		
Grenfell Shed and Wharf Municipal Heritage Site	Mary's Harbour NL	52°18′42″N 55°50′16″W	Mary's Harbour municipality (5747)		
Hebron Mission National Historic Site of Canada	Hebron NL	58°11′56″N 62°37′38″W	Federal (9620)		
Herring Store Registered Historic Structure	Battle Harbour NL	52°16′29″N 55°35′08″W	Newfoundland and Labrador (19765)		Upload Photo
Hopedale Mission National Historic Site of Canada	Hopedale NL	55°27′28″N 60°12′44″W	Federal (11597), Newfoundland and Labrador (19225)		
Hudson's Bay Company Net Loft	Rigolet NL	54°11′00″N 58°26′00″W	Newfoundland and Labrador (2235)		
Louie A. Hall	Forteau NL	51°28′22″N 56°57′17″W	Newfoundland and Labrador (2193)		
Moravian Church Registered Heritage Structure	Nain NL	56°32′46″N 61°41′32″W	Newfoundland and Labrador (15662)		
Okak National Historic Site of Canada	Okak NL	57°33′53″N 61°58′51″W	Federal (14408)		Upload Photo
Point Amour Lighthouse	L'Anse Amour NL	51°27′40″N 56°51′29″W	Federal (20377), Newfoundland and Labrador (14863)		
Pork Store Registered Historic Structure	Battle Harbour NL	52°16′27″N 55°35′07″W	Newfoundland and Labrador (19768)		Upload Photo
Pye House	Cape St. Charles NL	52°13′00″N 55°38′00″W	Newfoundland and Labrador (2141)		Upload Photo
Red Bay National Historic Site of Canada	Red Bay NL	51°44′00″N 56°25′42″W	Federal (14409)		
Royal Canadian Air Force Hangar 7	CFB Goose Bay; Happy Valley-Goose Bay NL	53°17′53″N 60°21′09″W	Federal (10870)		
Royal Canadian Air Force Hangar 8	CFB Goose Bay; Happy Valley-Goose Bay NL	53°17′53″N 60°21′10″W	Federal (10795)		
St. James Anglican Church	Battle Harbour NL	52°15′39″N 55°36′00″W	Newfoundland and Labrador (2137)		
Salmon Store Registered Historic Structure	Battle Harbour NL	52°16′28″N 55°35′10″W	Newfoundland and Labrador (19766)		Upload Photo
Salt Store Registered Historic Structure	Battle Harbour NL	52°16′26″N 55°35′09″W	Newfoundland and Labrador (19767)		Upload Photo
Seal Store Registered Historic Structure	Battle Harbour NL	52°16′27″N 55°35′08″W	Newfoundland and Labrador (19769)		Upload Photo
Isaac Smith House Registered Heritage Structure	Battle Harbour NL	52°15′39″N 55°36′36″W	Newfoundland and Labrador (10845)		
White Elephant Building Registered Heritage Structure	Makkovik NL	55°05′28″N 59°10′29″W	Newfoundland and Labrador (2146)		Upload Photo
Richard (Dick) White's Trading Post	Kauk Bight; Nain NL	56°43′00″N 61°44′00″W	Newfoundland and Labrador (2277)		Upload Photo

== See also ==
- List of historic places in Newfoundland and Labrador
- List of National Historic Sites of Canada in Newfoundland and Labrador
