= Resolution (1793 privateer) =

History

Great Britain
- Name: Resolution
- In service: 1793

General characteristics
- Tons burthen: 110 (bm)
- Sail plan: Lugger
- Complement: 60
- Armament: 12 × 3-pounder guns

Resolution was a privateer lugger operating out of Guernsey in 1793. She made several captures, most notably of the French East Indiaman St.Jean de Lone.

On 7 (or 11) March 1793, shortly after the outbreak of war with France, Captain William Le Lacheur acquired a letter of marque for Resolution.

Lloyd's List (LL) reported on 10 May 1793 that Resolution had sent into Guernsey Hewreaux, of 400 tons (bm), of Bordeaux, Renandet, master. She had been on a voyage from Charleston to Bordeaux. She was carrying sugar, rice, tobacco, and timber. She arrived in Guernsey on 19 April.

== Capture of St.Jean de Lone ==
St.Jean de Lone, Captain Marin Voisin, was returning from Pondicherry, Yanaon, and Madras to Ostend or L'Orient in May 1793 with [Indian] bale goods, black pepper, sugar, and dyewoods when on the 10th she encountered a British privateer from Liverpool. The privateer fired on St.Jean de Lone, alerting her to the fact that war with Britain had broken out. The French were able to repel the privateer, which sailed off.

However, on 12 May, St. Jean de Lone encountered the privateers Surprize, of London, William Seward, master, and Resolution. (Note: Surprize's letter of marque described her as a sloop of 147 tons (bm), armed with sixteen 9-pounder guns and four swivel guns, and having a crew of 75 men.)

St.Jean de Lone was armed with 12 guns and had a crew of 41 men. The cutter Surprize, which was armed with 10 guns, was the first to encounter St.Jean de Lone and the two maintained a running engagement for seven and a half hours before the lugger Resolution arrived on the scene. She joined the engagement, which continued a little while longer before St. Jean de Lone struck, some three hours out of Lorient and safety. She had lost one man killed and four wounded. Surprize had one man killed and six wounded, and Resolution had four men wounded. Surprize brought St. Jean de Lone into Plymouth, while Resolution returned to Guernsey to refit. St Jean de Lone and her cargo were valued at £150,000.

On 7 June LL reported that Resolution had sent into Guernsey Resolution [sic], which had been carrying spices from Lorient to Saint-Malo. The prize was valued at £8,000.

== Capture of Vigie ==
On 25 May 1799 at 43°N 16°W Captain Le Lacheur of Guernsey on the Resolution cutter captured a new French privateer, the schooner Vigie, and took Vigie into Falmouth. Vigie, of Bordeaux, Audilai, master, was armed with fourteen 4-pounder guns and had a crew of 71 men. Vigie had been eight days out of Corrunna and "taken nothing" before acquiring her prize. (Note: Vigie was a privateer schooner active in the Channel in 1799 with 71 men and 14 guns.)

== Retaking Perseverance ==
It was reported or 29 September 1799, that the Bellona privateer, of 26 twelve-pounders and 200 men, from Bordeaux, had captured Perseverance, Curtis, from London to Lisbon. Resolution recaptured Perseverance and sent her into Guernsey. Perseverance left Bellona in chase of two others of the convoy which had separated. The fleet sailed from Portsmouth 6 September under convoy of HMS Penelope, of 36 guns.

The Hampshire Telegraph and Naval Chronicle reported on 9 November 1799 that the frigate Nemesis, the sloop Anacreon, and the hired armed luggers Nile, Resolution, and Fanny had sailed on a cruise off the Coast of France.

== Capture of Immanuel ==
On 19 January 1801, it was advertised in the Hampshire and Naval Chronicle that the cargo of the captured Immanuel of Hamburgh would be auctioned on 19 February at East Cowes, Isle of Wight. The prize of the private ship of war Resolution and William La Lacheur, Commander.
