= HMS Nemesis (1780) =

Enterprise-class Royal Navy frigate

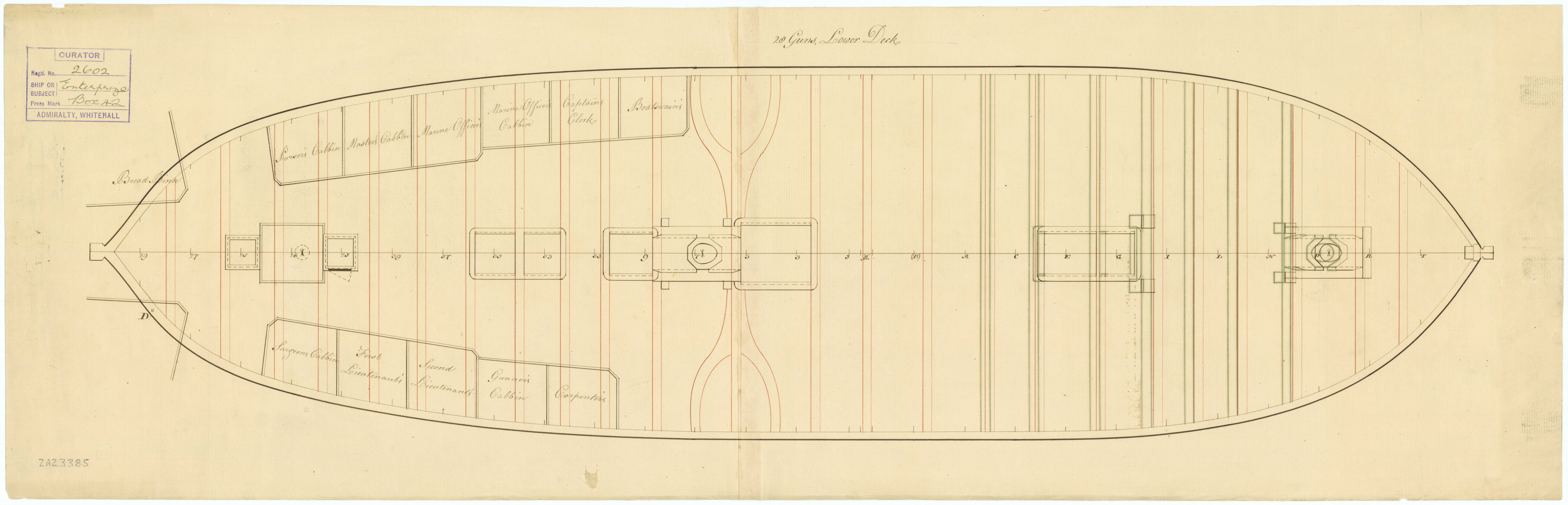
- Lower deck of HMS Nemesis

History

Great Britain
- Name: HMS Nemesis
- Ordered: 30 September 1777
- Builder: Jolly, Leathers & Barton, Liverpool; (completed after launch by John Smallshaw & Co after business failure of Jolly & Co.)
- Laid down: November 1777
- Launched: 23 January 1780
- Completed: 22 June 1780 (at Plymouth Dockyard)
- Commissioned: January 1780

France
- Name: Némésis
- Acquired: By capture on 9 December 1795
- Captured: Surrendered on 9 March 1796

Great Britain
- Name: HMS Nemesis
- Acquired: Captured on 9 March 1796
- Fate: Sold 9 June 1814

General characteristics
- Class & type: 28-gun Enterprise-class sixth-rate frigate
- Tons burthen: 598 37/94 (bm)
- Length: 120 ft 7 in (36.75 m) (overall); 99 ft 6 in (30.33 m) (keel)
- Beam: 33 ft 7 1/2 in (10.2 m)
- Depth of hold: 11 ft (3.4 m)
- Sail plan: Full-rigged ship
- Complement: 200 officers and men
- Armament: Upper deck: 24 × 9-pounder guns; QD: 4 × 6-pounder guns + 4 × 18-pounder carronades; Fc: 2 × 18-pounder carronades; 12 × swivel guns

HMS Nemesis was a 28-gun Enterprise-class sixth-rate frigate of the Royal Navy. The French captured her in 1795 at Smyrna, but in 1796 a squadron led by Barfleur brought her out of the neutral port of Tunis. Throughout her career she served under a number of commanders who would go on to have distinguished careers. She was converted to a troopship in 1812 and was sold in 1814.

== British service ==
Nemesis was first commissioned in January 1780 under the command of Captain Richard Rodney Bligh. Nemesis was in company with Viper on 3 January 1781 when they captured the Dutch vessel Catherine. Then she captured the French privateer Alliance on 5 June. She was paid off from wartime service in 1784. Lastly, Nemesis was among the vessels sharing in the proceeds of the capture on 30 March 1783 of the Dutch ship Arendt op Zee. She was paid off in May 1784 after wartime service.

Between December 1787 and November 1789 Nemesis was at Deptford undergoing a major repair. Batson, Limehouse, fitted her for sea between May and September 1790. Captain Alexander Ball commissioned her in May, but then paid her off in 1792.

== French Revolutionary Wars ==
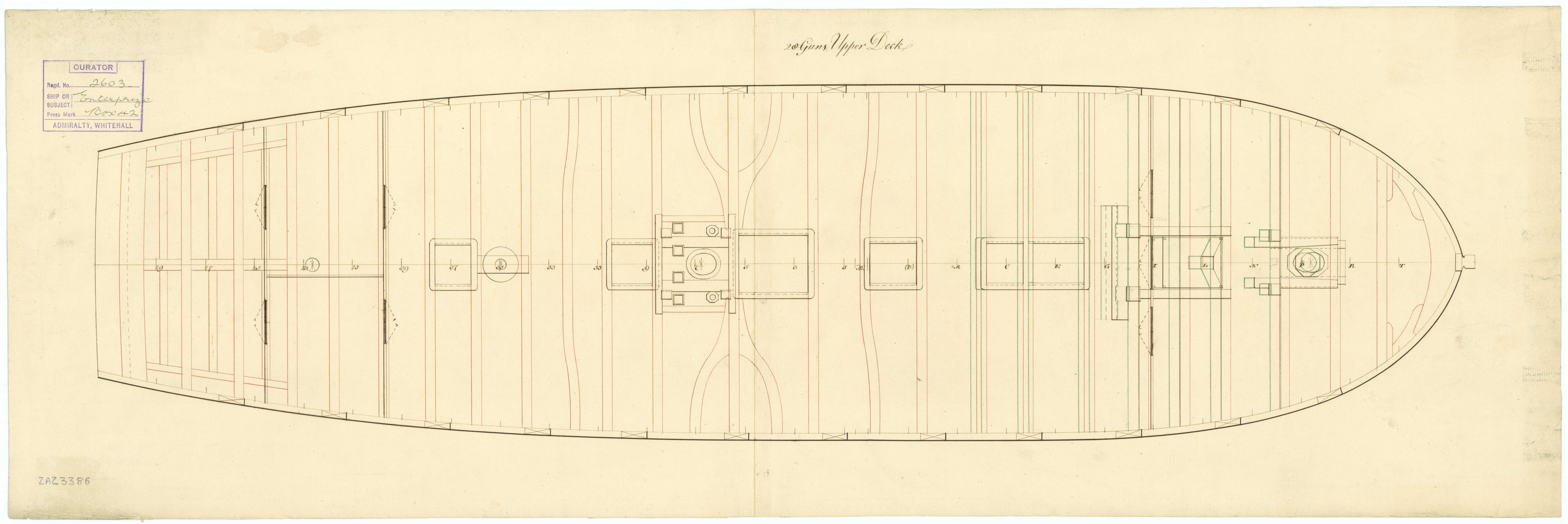
Upper deck plan

Captain J. Woodey commissioned her in October 1792. He sailed for the Mediterranean on 26 April 1793. By September, Nemesis was under the command of Captain Lord Amelius Beauclerk.

On 28 and 29 August 1793, a Spanish-British force captured Toulon in the opening act of what would become the siege of Toulon. They would hold it until December when they would evacuate. Nemesis was among the vessels sharing in the prize money for the capture.

Captain Samuel Hood Linzee replaced Beauclerk in March 1794. Nemesis was among the many vessels and troops sharing in the proceeds of the capture of Calvi, Corsica, on 10 August 1794.

== Capture and recapture ==
On 9 December 1795, part of Gantaume's squadron, consisting of the frigate Sensible, and the corvettes Sardine and Rossignol, captured Nemesis, which had grounded and after refloating had anchored out of range of the fort in the neutral port of Smyrna.

According to British accounts, the French warships entered the harbour in disregard of its neutrality and called on Nemesis to surrender, which she did when the French refused to honour the port's neutrality and fired on her. French accounts, on the other hand, state that a British officer was invited on Sensible to acknowledge that Nemesis was outside the protected neutral zone, before Sensible was called on to surrender, to which her captain agreed after a token shot would be fired. Three men from Nemesis, a sailor and two Royal Marines, defected to the French and joined Sardine.

On 9 March 1796, Nemesis was anchored in the neutral harbour of Tunis, together with Sardine and Postillon. The British sent a squadron under the command of Vice-Admiral William Waldegrave to recapture Nemesis. The ships of the line Egmont, Barfleur, Bombay Castle, and Zealous, along with the frigate HMS Tartar and the cutter Fox, anchored in the bay. Ensign Chautard, of Némésis, was invited aboard Barfleur and informed that diplomatic relations between Tunis and England had been broken, that England would soon declare war on Tunis, and that he would therefore to renounce the neutrality of the harbour. The British then threatened to sink the French ships if they did not strike their colours. Resistance being futile in the face of these overwhelming odds, the French surrendered and boats from the ships of the line took possession of the ships.

The British took the three men who had defected from Nemesis to Sardine and hanged them. The other crew members of the three ships were released ashore. The fourth French vessel, Gerfaut, refused to surrender, preferring to scuttle, and she thrice repelled assaults from the British boats before beaching herself. In the automatic court-martial for the loss of the ships, Ensign Chautard was acquitted due to the disproportion of forces.

Admiral Jervis sent Nemesis, Sardine, and Postillon to Ajaccio. He had Postillon repaired and painted before selling her to Sir Gilbert Elliot the British viceroy of the Anglo-Corsican Kingdom, for onward transfer to the Dey of the Regency of Algiers. Nemesis returned to British service, and Sardine was brought into the Royal Navy.

== Return to British service ==
Nemesis was found to be in need of refit after brief foreign service. Under temporary command of Captain John Halliday she was sailed to Portsmouth Dockyard where she was paid off in September 1796 and left at anchor awaiting repair. Work was conducted between August 1797 and March 1798. Captain Robert Dudley Oliver recommissioned her in February 1798 and she set sail for Halifax on 17 April 1798 as escort for a merchant convoy.

Captain Thomas Baker replaced Oliver in January 1799. On 27 October, Nemesis recaptured the War Onsean. That same day, Nemesis and the hired armed lugger Nile captured five French fishing vessels.

It's reported on 9 November 1799 in the Hampshire Telegraph and Naval Chronicle that Nemesis, with the Anacreon sloop, and the Nile, Resolution, and Fanny hired armed luggers, have sailed on a cruise off the Coast of France.

On 12 January 1800 Nemesis captured the French privateer lugger Renard. She was armed with fourteen 4-pounder guns and two swivel guns, and had a crew of 65 men under the command of Jean Jacque Fourmintin. She had sailed the morning before from Boulogne, in company with six other privateer luggers. In the day she had been out, she had captured the brig Atlas, which had been sailing from Lisbon to Dungeness. Savage was in company with Nemesis. Baker sent a signal to Captain Thompson of Savage, who then recaptured the brig, which Nemesis had had to bypass while chasing Renard.

Shortly thereafter, Nemesis sighted two other luggers to leeward. He came up on one, the privateer Modere, just as the hired armed lugger Nile was boarding her.

Baker then took the two captured privateers and the recaptured brig in charge. He then escorted them to the Downs, where he arrived at 5am on 13 January. However, before he left, he deployed several British vessels that had arrived to try to intercept either the other privateer luggers, or any vessels that might have been captured from a convoy that HMS Narcissus had been escorting up the Channel. (Note: As there was no Narcissus in service in 1800, it is not clear to which vessel Baker was referring.) He sent Nile to watch Calais and the hired armed cutter Union, Lieutenant Guyon commanding, to watch Boulogne. He asked Thompson to use his own judgement in deciding on which port to concentrate. During the night Nemesis encountered the cutter Stag to watch those ports also.

On 21 May 1800 Nemesis captured the Rosette, which was carrying a cargo of salt.

Nemesis was among the many British vessels that shared in the proceeds of the capture of the French frigate Désirée, which Dart, under Patrick Campbell, captured on 8 July 1800 in the Raid on Dunkirk.

On 25 July Nemesis was part of a squadron that also included Terpsichore, Prevoyante, Arrow, and the hired lugger Nile, when it encountered the Danish frigate HDMS Freja, which was escorting a convoy of two ships, two brigs and two galliots. Baker hailed her and said that he would send a boat to board the convoy. The Danish captain refused, and said that if a boat approached he would fire on it. Baker sent a midshipman and four men in a boat, and the Danes fired several shots, which missed the boat, but one of which killed a man on Nemesis. Nemesis then opened fire with her broadside. After an engagement of about 25 minutes, Freya, much damaged, struck. She had suffered eight men killed and many wounded; both Nemesis and Arrow each suffered two men killed and several wounded.

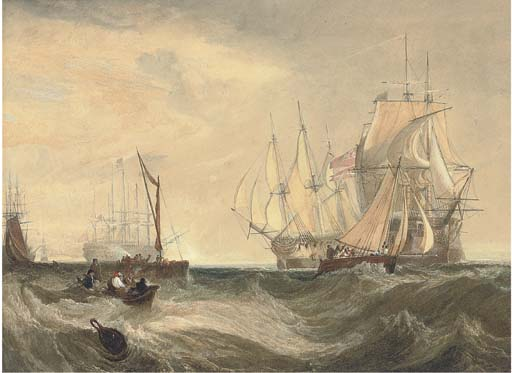
H.M. Ships Nemesis and Arrow bringing the Danish frigate Freja and her convoy into the Downs in July 1800. Clarkson Stanfield

The British brought Freja and her convoy into the Downs on 6 March. They later released her, and presumably the rest of the convoy. This incident led to strained relations with Denmark, and, in order to anticipate any hostile move from the Danes, the British government despatched Earl Whitworth in August on a special mission to Copenhagen. The Danes not being ready for war, his mission staved off hostilities for about a year. In 1807, after the second battle of Copenhagen, the British captured Freja and took her into the Royal Navy as HMS Freya.

Much less momentously, on 27 October, Nemesis and the lugger Nile captured five fishing vessels.

In January 1801, Nemesis was under the command of Captain Edward Owen in the Irish Sea and the Channel. On 7 January she was at anchor at Deal when she suffered the loss of seven of her crew, their boat having overturned as they were returning from a visit to the shore. Captain Phillip Somerville assumed command of Nemesis in May 1802.

== Napoleonic Wars ==
On 22 May 1803, Nemesis and Révolutionnaire captured the French brig Alexander. (Note: The prize money for petty officers was £1 15s 5d; a seaman's share was worth 9s 10d.) Six days later, Nemesis and Sirius were in company when they captured the French ship Mere de Familie. (Note: The prize money for petty officers was £37 7s 11d; a seaman's share was worth £10 17s 5d, or almost six months' wages.) That same day they also shared in the capture of the French ship Zephyr. The capture of the Aigle on 30 May resulted in a preliminary allotment to Sirius's crew of £6200 in prize money. Then on 8 June Sirius captured the Trois Freres. Sirius shared with Nemesis the proceeds of the capture of the Trois Freres and the Aigle.

On 31 May, Nemesis captured the French schooner Les Amis. (Note: The prize money for petty officers was £21 5s 6d; a seaman's share was worth £4 17s 5d.)

On 3 May 1806, Nemesis detained the Danish brig Bergens Handel. (Note: A petty officer's share of the prize money was worth 12s 10d; a seaman's share was worth 2s 11½d.) Somerville then sailed Nemesis with a convoy for Newfoundland on 29 August. She was then at Newfoundland in 1807. She took a convoy to North America on 16 April 1808.

Captain William Ferris took command in March 1809. Ferris sailed Nemesis to the Baltic at some point in 1809. On 17 April Nemesis and Alexandria captured the Danish vessel Nicholette Johanna. On 12 July she captured the Danish vessels Dodre and Forsoget. A last payment of head money for Forsoget, which was a Danish privateer, was paid in September 1830, by which time Ferris was dead. (Note: A first-class share was worth £9 13s 4½d; a sixth-class share was worth 1s 9½d.)

On 23 July 1810, boats from HMS Belvidera, Captain Richard Byron, and Nemesis attacked three gun-schooners of the Dano-Norwegian Navy. The British captured two 8-gun vessels, the Thor and Balder, and her crew abandoned a third, smaller gunboat of three guns that the British burnt. The British report that the Danes lost four men killed while the British sustained no casualties. The British prize money reckoning refers to three vessels, Balder, Thor and Fortuna. Fortuna may have been a merchant vessel seized at the time.

Nemesis also sailed to the Greenland fishery in 1810. In April 1811 she came under the command of Captain William Bowles for the east coast of Africa.

== Troopship ==
Between September 1811 and May 1812, Nemesis was at Sheerness being fitted as a troopship. Commander James Maude commissioned her in February as a 16-gun troopship. On 30 March 1813 the 2nd Royal Marine Battalion embarked on the ships HMS Romulus, HMS Diomede, HMS Nemesis, and HMS Fox set sail on 7 April, and arrived in Bermuda on 29 May 1813.

Nemesis was among the British vessels that shared in the capture on 21 June of the American ship Herman, and her cargo. (Note: A first-class share of the prize money was worth £47 13s 4d; a sixth-class share, that of an ordinary seaman, was worth 7s 6d.)

On 11 July 1813, Nemesis was with Romulus, Fox, Sceptre, and Conflict, and the tenders Highflyer and Cockchafer, anchored off the Ocracoke bar, in the Outer Banks of North Carolina. There the boats of the squadron captured the brig, Anaconda, of 18 guns, and a privateer schooner, the Atlas, of 10 guns. The British took the two prizes into service as Anaconda and St Lawrence. (Note: A first-class share of the prize money for the two was worth £32 3s 2¼d; a sixth-class share was worth 9s 8¼d.) Nemesis then sailed north and next appears at Montreal on 31 October as one of six ships that brought two battalions of Royal Marines and two batteries of Royal Marine artillery to Montreal from Halifax to help protect that city after the defeat of the British at the Battle of Lake Erie.

By 22 December Nemesis was back in the Channel. On that day she assisted the brig-sloop Helicon in her chase Revenant, a French privateer schooner. Helicon captured Revenant and her crew of 75, some five leagues south of the Eddystone. She was one day out of Saint-Malo and had made no captures.

== Fate ==
Nemesis was paid off in March 1814. She was offered for sale at Plymouth on 9 June 1814, and was sold that day for £1,610 on 9 June 1814. As was common with larger ships, the purchaser had to post bond, with two sureties, that she would break up his purchase within a year.
