= Isabella (1793 ship) =

History

France
- Name: St.Jean de Lone
- Namesake: Saint-Jean-de-Losne
- Launched: 1791
- Captured: 12 May 1793

Great Britain
- Name: Isabella
- Acquired: 1793 by purchase of a prize
- Fate: No longer active after 1802

General characteristics
- Tons burthen: 407, or 420, or 459, or 45985/94 (bm)
- Length: Overall:112 ft 9 in (34.4 m); Keel:89 ft 3 in (27.2 m)
- Beam: 31 ft 1 1/2 in (9.5 m)
- Depth of hold: 13 ft 6 in (4.1 m)
- Complement: 1795:32; 1800:45
- Armament: 1794: 2 × 6-pounder guns; 1795: 10 guns + 2 × 6&18-pounder carronades; 1799: 10 × 6-pounder guns; 1800: 18 × 6&18-pounder cannons

Isabella was launched in France in 1791 as the East Indiaman St Jean de Lone. Two British privateers captured her in 1793. She was sold in prize and renamed Isabella. She initially sailed as a West Indiaman and then between 1795 and 1798 made two voyages to India as an "extra" ship for the British East India Company (EIC). Afterwards, she returned to the West Indies and Baltic trades and was last listed in 1809, but with data stale since c.1802.

== French East Indiaman ==
St.Jean de Lone was built in France in 1791.

Captain Marin Voisin was returning from Pondicherry, Yanaon, and Madras to Ostend or L'Orient in May 1793 with [Indian] bale goods, black pepper, sugar and dyewoods when on the 10th she encountered a British privateer from Liverpool. The privateer fired on St.Jean de Lone, alerting her to the fact that war with Britain had broken out. The French were able to repel the privateer, which sailed off.

However, on 12 May, St. Jean de Lone encountered the privateers Surprize, of London, William Seward, master, and Resolution, of Guernsey, William Le Lacheur, master. (Note: Surprize's letter of marque described her as a sloop of 147 tons (bm), armed with sixteen 9-pounder guns and four swivel guns, and having a crew of 75 men. Resolution's letter of marque described her as a lugger of 110 tons (bm), armed with twelve 3-pounder guns, and having a crew of 60 men.)

St.Jean de Lone was armed with 12 guns and had a crew of 41 men. The cutter Surprize, which was armed with 10 guns, was the first to encounter St.Jean de Lone and the two maintained a running engagement for two and a half hours before the lugger Resolution arrived on the scene. She joined the engagement, which continued for another five hours before St. Jean de Lone struck, some three hours out of Lorient and safety. She had lost one man killed and four wounded. Surprize had one man killed and six wounded, and Resolution had four men wounded. Surprize brought St. Jean de Lone into Plymouth, while Resolution returned to Guernsey to refit. St Jean de Lone and her cargo were valued at £150,000.

== British merchantman ==
St.Jean de Lone was condemned in prize on 26 July 1793. Wilkinson & Co., London, purchased and renamed her Isabella. (Note: George Wilkinson would be Isabella's master on her two voyages for the EIC. A George Wilkinson had received a letter of marque for Surprize in February 1793, only to be followed in April by William Seward, who had captured St.Jean de Lone. It is possible, and perhaps even probable, that the two George Wilkinson's were the same.)

Isabella first appeared in Lloyd's Register (LR) in 1794.

Year	Master	Owner	Trade	Source
1794	R.Murray	Wilkinson & Co.	London–Grenada	LR
1796	R.Murray; G.Wilkinson	Wilkinson & Co.	Cork–Grenada; London–East indies	LR

In 1795 G.Wilkinson chartered Isabella to the EIC. Before she sailed Perry, Blackwall, measured her.

1st EIC voyage (1795–1796): Captain George Wilkinson acquired a letter of marque on 11 June 1795. He sailed from Gravesend on 14 June, from Deal on 15 June, and from the Downs on 6 July, bound for Bengal. Isabella arrived at Balasore on 30 November. Homeward bound, she was at Calcutta on 18 January 1796 and at the Cape on 19 April. She reached St Helena on 5 May and arrived back in the Downs on 3 August.

2nd EIC voyage (1796–1798): Captain Wilkinson sailed from Portsmouth on 18 October 1793, bound for Madras, Bombay, and Bengal. Isabella reached Madras on 12 February 1797. She then was at Colombo on 28 February and arrived at Bombay on 28 March. She returned to Madras on 11 May and arrived at Calcutta on 1 July. Homeward bound, she was at Saugor on 26 November and the Cape on 18 February 1798. She reached St Helena on 21 March and Cork on 25 June, and arrived at the Downs on 8 July.

On her return, Isabella resumed the West Indies trade, but with a new master and owner.

Year	Master	Owner	Trade	Source
1798	Wilkinson; G. Brown	Capt. & Co. Hankey	London–India; London–Grenada	LR

A key source states that in 1799 Isabella was lost at sea. However, on 22 September 1800, Captain George Brown acquired a letter of marque. Isabella, Brown, master, arrived back at Gravesend on 2 July 1799 from Grenada.

Year	Master	Owner	Trade	Source & notes
1800	G.Brown	Hankey & Co.	London–Grenada	RS
1805	G.Dunbar	Hankey & Co.	London–Bordeaux (Note: In 1804–1805 Britain was again at war with France. This suggests that the entry in RS represents stale data from the period of the Treaty of Amiens (25 March 1802–18 May 1803).)	LR; good repair 1802
1805	G.Brown	Hankey & Co.	London–Bordeaux	RS

Although there are records of Isabella with Brown or Dunbar as master sailing to Danzig, Drontheim, Martinique, and Madeira during the 1801–1802 period, she does not appear in LL in the 1803–1804 period.
