= Jersey Packet =

History
- Owner: 1770 Brethren's Society for the Furtherance of the Gospel among the Heathen

General characteristics
- Tons burthen: 80
- Sail plan: Sloop

The Jersey Packet was a small 18th-century sloop of 80 tons burden.

== History ==
She appears to have started life as a packet boat plying between Jersey in the Channel Islands and the UK mainland. In 1755 and 1756 she was commanded on this route by Pierre Labey. One of the original owners was John Thoreau of Jersey. An early reference to her is in the London Chronicle of 10 February 1761 where she is reported as arriving in Southampton on 7 February from Jersey.

In 1770 she was purchased by the Brethren's Society for the Furtherance of the Gospel among the Heathen for use as the first of twelve Moravian Church mission ships. In this capacity she made a single voyage from London to Labrador in the summer of same year, under the command of Captain Thomas Mugford with six crew and ten missionaries. She was described in a contemporary letter as

...not only a tight and sound ship, but also a prime sailer, readily obedient to the helm, and out-sailing all the vessels on the river on the passage down to Gravesend.

— Reverend Benjamin La Trobe,

On the outbound voyage Jersey Packet called at Lymington for a supply of sails and Exmouth for a quantity of fishing tackle arriving Labrador on 24 July. In Labrador she called at Byron's Bay, Eskimo Bay and Nunengoak Bay arriving back in London on 16 November 1770.
