= Resolution (1802 ship) =

History

United Kingdom
- Name: Resolution
- Owner: J.L. Wollin
- Builder: Spain
- Launched: 1800
- Acquired: 1802 by purchase
- Fate: Wrecked 1810

General characteristics
- Tons burthen: 128, or 137 (bm)
- Draught: 10 feet (no knees)
- Propulsion: Sail
- Sail plan: Brig
- Armament: 2 × 4-pounder guns
- Notes: Two decks. Single hull in 1803, but double hull in 1808.

Resolution was a brig built in Spain and launched in 1800 that was probably a prize. The Brethren's Society for the Furtherance of the Gospel among the Heathen purchased her in 1802 for service as a Moravian Church mission ship. These vessels made an annual voyage from London to the Moravian Church mission stations in Labrador every summer bringing provisions and exchanging missionaries. The Church sold her in 1808 and she was wrecked on the coast of Africa in 1810.

Resolution first appeared in Lloyd's Register in 1802 with J. Fraser, master, and, owner. The only information on her held in the church archives states that she was "...a Spanish vessel ... captured and sold as a prize."

In November 1803, a French frigate twice captured Resolution, but she was able to escape due to the weather. On 18 November a French frigate chased Resolution, caught up with her, and forced her to remain in company. The sea was too rough though for the French to be able to send over a boat and take possession. During the second night after her capture, Resolution's captain was able to escape in the dark. Two days after her escape, Resolution encountered the same frigate again, and again had to accompany her. This time too the weather prevented the French from taking possession. The following night Resolution was able to sail away, this time for good.

Resolution continued in service as a mission ship into 1808 when the missionary society reportedly sold her in the autumn.

Year	Master	Owner	Trade	Source
1809	J.Frazier; Blaksley	Weller	London–Labrador; Illegible	Register of Shipping (RS)
1810	T.Blaksley	T.Wilson	London–Africa	RS

On 19 January 1809, Resolution, Blakely, master, arrived at Portsmouth, bound for Africa. However, a gale there on 30 January cost her her bowsprit, foremast, and rigging.

On 5 May, Resolution, Blakesby, master, sailed from Portsmouth for Gorée as part of a small convoy. On 31 May Resolution, Blakesby, master, was at Madeira, having come from London. Lloyd's List reported on 28 August 1810 that Resolution, Blaksley, master, had been totally lost on the coast of Africa.

The Register of Shipping for 1810 carried the annotation "LOST" by her name.

Lloyd's Register continued to carry her with unchanged ownership through to 1814, though by 1811 her master was A. Fraser. She was no longer listed after 1814.
