= Hired armed lugger Nile =

At least two vessels known as His Majesty's hired armed lugger Nile served the Royal Navy during the French Revolutionary and Napoleonic Wars. These may have been the same vessel on sequential contracts.

== The first lugger Nile ==
The first lugger Nile had a burthen of 17618/94, and was armed with two 6-pounder guns and ten 12-pounder carronades. She served on a contract from 23 March 1799 to 21 November 1801.

From 1799 to 1800 Nile was under the command of Lieutenant Ricard Whitehead. On 12 January 1800 Nile was under the command of her master, Stephen Butcher (or Bucher), Lieutenant Whitehead being ill on shore, when she captured the French privateer lugger Moderé. Modere was armed with four 4-pounder guns and had a crew of 42 men. She was only six hours out of Boulogne and hand not taken anything. As Nile was boarding her prize, Nemesis came up. Captain Baker, of Nemesis took Moderé in charge and took her, as well as another captured privateer, Renard, and a recaptured brig, and took them into the Downs. Before leaving, Baker sent Nile to watch the port of Calais to try and intercept some other privateer luggers known to be out, and any captured British ships. Nile shared in the proceeds of Moderé and Renard with Nemesis and the cutter Stag.

On 6 February Nile brought into Deal two recaptured West Indiamen, one, Elizabeth, had sailed from Jamaica.

At some point in early 1800, Nile and the hired armed cutter Earl Spencer recaptured Molly, which was in ballast. This was probably Molley, which had been sailing from Exeter to Newcastle when a French privateer had captured her. Molley came into Deal on 14 February.

Nile was among the many British vessels that shared in the proceeds of the capture of the French frigate Désirée, which HMS Dart, under Patrick Campbell, captured on 8 July in the Raid on Dunkirk. Nile, under Butcher, performed a useful service by laying as a leading mark at Gravelines Hook. Nile then brought the news of the action into Dover the next day.

While under Bucher's command, Nile captured Marie.

On 25 July 1800 Nemesis was part of a squadron that also included Terpsichore, Prevoyante, Arrow, and Nile, when it encountered the Danish frigate HDMS Freja, which was escorting a convoy of two ships, two brigs and two galliots. Baker hailed her and said that he would send a boat to board the convoy. The Danish captain refused, and said that if a boat approached he would fire on it. Baker sent a midshipman and four men in a boat, and the Danes fired several shots, which missed the boat, but one of which killed a man on Nemesis. Nemesis then opened fire with her broadside. After an engagement of about 25 minutes, Freja, much damaged, struck. She had suffered eight men killed and many wounded; both Nemesis and Arrow each suffered two men killed and several wounded. The British brought Freya and her convoy into the Downs on 6 March. They later released her, and presumably the rest of the convoy. This incident led to strained relations with Denmark, and, in order to anticipate any hostile move from Copenhagen, the British government despatched Earl Whitworth in August on a special mission to Copenhagen. The Danes not being ready for war, his mission staved off hostilities for about a year. In 1807, after the second battle of Copenhagen, the British captured Freja and took her into the Royal Navy as HMS Freya.

Much less momentously, on 27 October, Nemesis and Nile captured five fishing vessels.

On 1 November Nile captured the French privateer Renard off Folkestone. Lieutenant Whitehead was again sick on shore so Nile was under the command of Mr. Butcher. Renard was armed with two 3-pounder guns, and had a crew of 13 men under the command of Michael Bernard Hamelin. She had left Calais at 4pm the previous afternoon and when she was captured she was alongside a merchant ship.

== Second lugger Nile ==
The second lugger Nile had a burthen of 17022/94, was armed with fourteen 12-pounder carronades, and had a crew of 50 men. She served on a contract from 26 April March 1804 to 25 October 1806. The Admiralty paid an annual charge of £4576 for her hire. She may have been the lugger Nile of 174 tons, fourteen 12-pounder guns, and 55 men under the command of John Blake, that received a letter of marque on 21 July 1803.

In 1805 Nile was under the command of Lieutenant John (or George) Fennell (or Fennel). In March she captured the French chasse maree Deux Freres and the brig St François. On 17 June Nile captured the French brig Jeune Nanine.

Fennel was still in command of Nile at the battle of Cape Finisterre (Calder's Action). Though the cutter Frisk and Nile stayed out of the fight and suffered no casualties, as per regulations they shared in the proceeds for the capture of the Spanish ships Firme and San Rafael.

Fennel died in 1805 and his replacement, in September, was Lieutenant Symonds (or Simmonds). On 2 May 1806 Nile was in company with two Jersey privateers, the Success and the Phoenix, when they captured the Spanish brig Santa Alodias, or Alvalia. (Note: Phoenix may have been the cutter of 75 tons, six 4-pounder guns, and 15 men under the command of Frederick White, that received a letter of marque on 19 April. Success may have been the smack of 51 tons, six 4-pounder guns, and 30 men under the command of Philip Payne, that received her letter of marque on 23 January 1805.)

Nile may also have been the lugger Nile, of 175 tons (bm), ten 12-pounder guns, and 40 men, whose master, Thomas Butcher, received a letter of marque on 30 December 1808.
