= HMS Narcissus =

Six ships of the Royal Navy have been named HMS Narcissus after the Narcissus of mythology, or after the Narcissi flowers.

- HMS Narcissus (1781) was a 20-gun post ship launched in 1781 and wrecked in 1796.
- HMS Narcissus (1801) was a 32-gun fifth-rate frigate launched in 1801, converted to a convict ship after 1823, and sold 1837.
- A 28-gun sixth-rate Narcissus of 601 tons was ordered in 1846 but cancelled in 1848.
- A 50-gun fourth-rate Narcissus of 1,996 tons was ordered in 1849 and cancelled in 1857.
- HMS Narcissus (1859) was a wooden-hulled screw frigate in service from 1859 to 1883.
- HMS Narcissus (1886) was an armoured cruiser launched in 1886 and sold in 1906.
- HMS Narcissus (1915) was an Acacia-class sloop in use from 1915 to 1922.
- HMS Narcissus (1941) was a Flower-class corvette launched in 1941 and sold 1946.
