= Okak, Newfoundland and Labrador =

Ghost town in Labrador, Canada

Okak
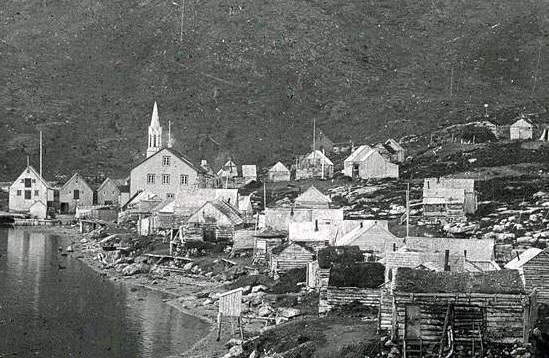
- Okak sometime before 1919

- Location within Canada Location within Newfoundland and Labrador
- 57°33′44.6″N 61°59′03.3″W
- Location: Newfoundland and Labrador, Canada

Site notes
- Governing body: Parks Canada

National Historic Site of Canada

Okak is a former community located on Okak Bay in northern Labrador. It was founded in 1776 by Jens Haven, a missionary of the Moravian Church. In 1918, Moravian missionaries brought an outbreak of Spanish influenza that devastated Okak, killing 204 out of a population of 263.

== Moravian mission (1776-1919) ==
In 1771 George III of the United Kingdom gave a land grant to the Moravian Church to establish missions for the local Inuit in northern Labrador. In the 18th century, Jens Haven and his followers built missions at Nain (1771), Okak (1776) and Hopedale (1782). These missions also served as trading posts. Later on, other Moravian settlements were established at Hebron (1830), Zoar (1865), Ramah (1871), Makkovik (1896) and Killinek in Nunavut (1904).

Money and personnel to run the infrastructure were provided by the Unity Mission Board in Saxony and the Niesky Mission Training School. However, this assistance was hampered by the effects of World War I and the devastation of the German economy.

In 1918, Moravian missionaries brought an outbreak of Spanish influenza that devastated Okak, killing 204 out of a population of 263.

Shortly thereafter, the Moravians sold their trading post at Okak to the Hudson's Bay Company. In 1956 the settlement was abandoned when the remaining inhabitants were compelled by the Canadian government to relocate to other communities in Labrador. Today, all that remains of Okak are a graveyard and ruins of the former mission.

Okak was designated a National Historic Site of Canada in 1978, due to the former Moravian mission and the existence of sixty archaeological sites in the area, dating from 5550 BCE and representing of habitation from Maritime Archaic to Labrador Inuit.

In 1985, a 24-minute documentary was made about the influenza outbreak, entitled "The Last Days of Okak".

== Okak National Historic Site ==
The Okak National Historic Site of Canada contains over 60 archaeological sites dating from 5550 BCE to the present. These sites are located on Okak Bay off the northern coast of Labrador. Okak was designated as a national historic site of Canada in 1978 because it features a series of archaeological sites that represent a long record of habitation from Maritime Archaic (beginning about 6000 years ago) to recent Labrador Inuit. It is the location of the second oldest Moravian mission in Labrador, founded in 1776 and abandoned in 1919 after most of the people died due to the 1918 flu pandemic.

The archaeological remains found at Okak span more than 6000 years, including its occupation by Maritime Archaic (5550 B.C.E.- 1550 B.C.E.), Paleo-Eskimo including Pre-Dorset (1850 B.C.E. – 250 B.C.E.), Intermediate Indian (1550 B.C.E. – 250 B.C.E.), Dorset (550 B.C.E. – 1450 C.E.) and Labrador Inuit (1200 C.E. – present) cultures.

The cultural material consists primarily of stone tools and flakes documenting changes in tool form, manufacturing techniques, and raw material sources among the various cultural periods. The oldest archaeological finds date from the Maritime Archaic period on Cut Throat Island.

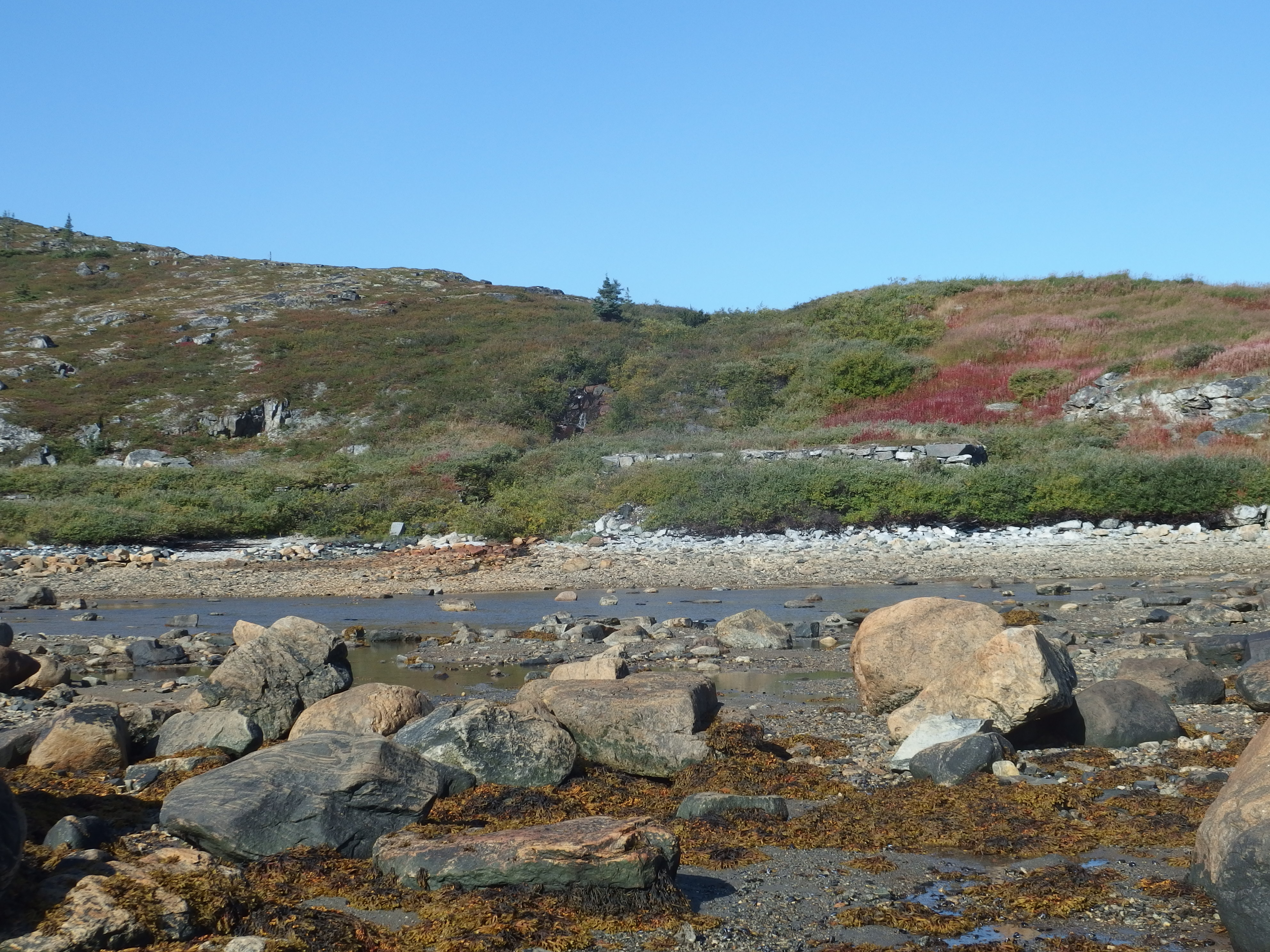
The foundations of Okak in 2023

In 1776, Moravian Missionaries established a mission site on Okak Island, just off Okak Harbour. It was the second successful mission to be established by the Moravian Missionaries on the Labrador Coast, the first being founded at Nain, 400 km (250 mi) to the south in 1771. The Okak Mission was prefabricated at Nain, and then transported north to Okak, along with a provisions house and bake house. Inuit houses were also constructed here as families gradually relocated to be closer to the mission. Changing hunting patterns and the Spanish Influenza epidemic of 1918-1919 caused the mission to be abandoned in 1919. Foundations of buildings, walkways and a wharf remain from the mission era.

== See also ==
- List of historic places in Labrador
- Moravian Church Mission Ships
