= Dyewoods =

A dyewood is any of a number of varieties of wood which provide dyes for textiles and other purposes. Among the more important are:

- Paubrasilia, commonly known as brazilwood, from Brazil, producing a red dye.
- Catechu or cutch from acacia wood, producing a dark brown dye.
- Maclura tinctoria, known as old fustic or dyer's mulberry, from India and Africa, producing a yellow dye.
- Haematoxylum campechianum, known as logwood, from Belize, producing a red or purple dye.
