= Nain, Newfoundland and Labrador =

Nain Nunainguk
- Inuit community
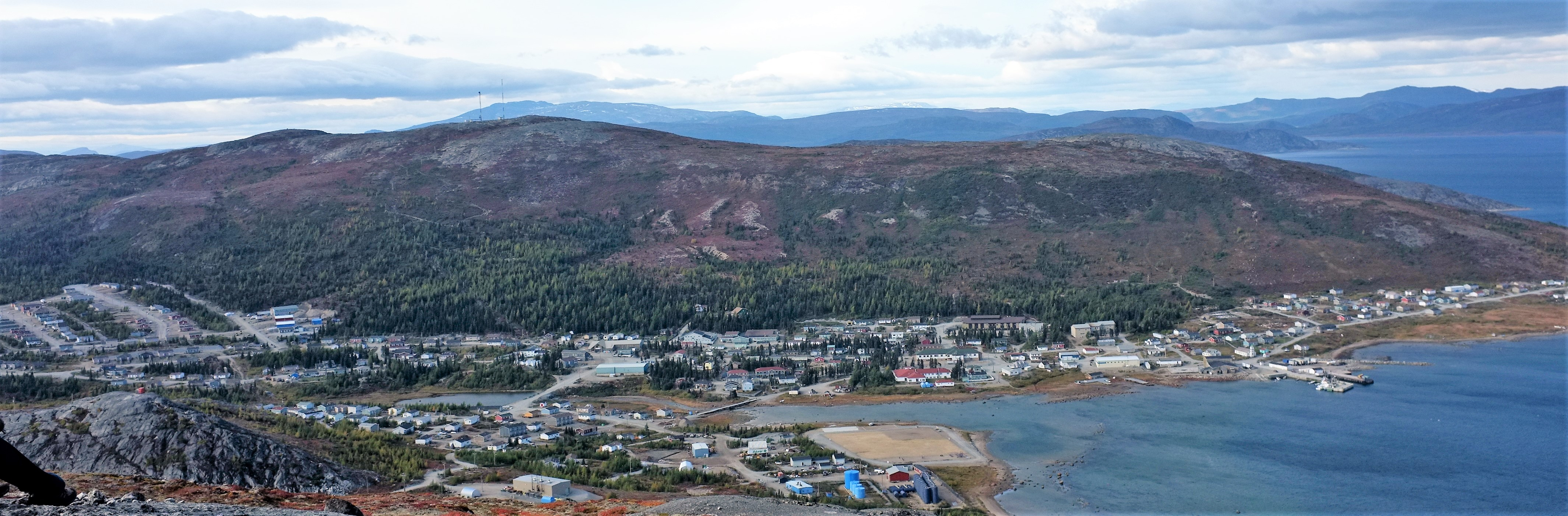
- Nain as viewed from Mt. Sophie, September 2011.

- Location of Nain in the province
- Coordinates: 56°32′11″N 61°43′08″W
- Country: Canada
- Province: Newfoundland and Labrador
- Region: Nunatsiavut
- Settled: 1771

Government
  - Type: Inuit Community Government
  - Mayor (AngajukKâk): Joe Dicker
  - Federal MP: Philip Earle (L)
  - Provincial MHA: Lela Evans (PC)
  - Nunatsiavut Assembly members: Anthony Andersen; Roxanne Barbour

Area
  - Total: 94.58 km^{2} (36.52 sq mi)
- Elevation: 11 m (36 ft)

Population (2021)
  - Total: 1,204
  - Density: 11.9/km^{2} (31/sq mi)
- Time zone: UTC-04:00 (AST)
  - Summer (DST): UTC-03:00 (ADT)
- Postal code span: A0P
- Area code: 709

Nain (Inuit language: Nunainguk ᓄᓀᖕᒍᒃ or Nain ᓀᓐ) is the northernmost permanent settlement in the Canadian province of Newfoundland and Labrador, within the Nunatsiavut region, located about 370 km (230 mi) by air from Happy Valley-Goose Bay. The town was established as a Moravian mission in 1771 by Jens Haven and other missionaries. As of 2021, the population is 1,204 mostly Inuit and mixed Inuit-European. Nain is the administrative capital of the autonomous region of Nunatsiavut.

Nain is inaccessible by road and may be reached only by air or sea.

== History ==
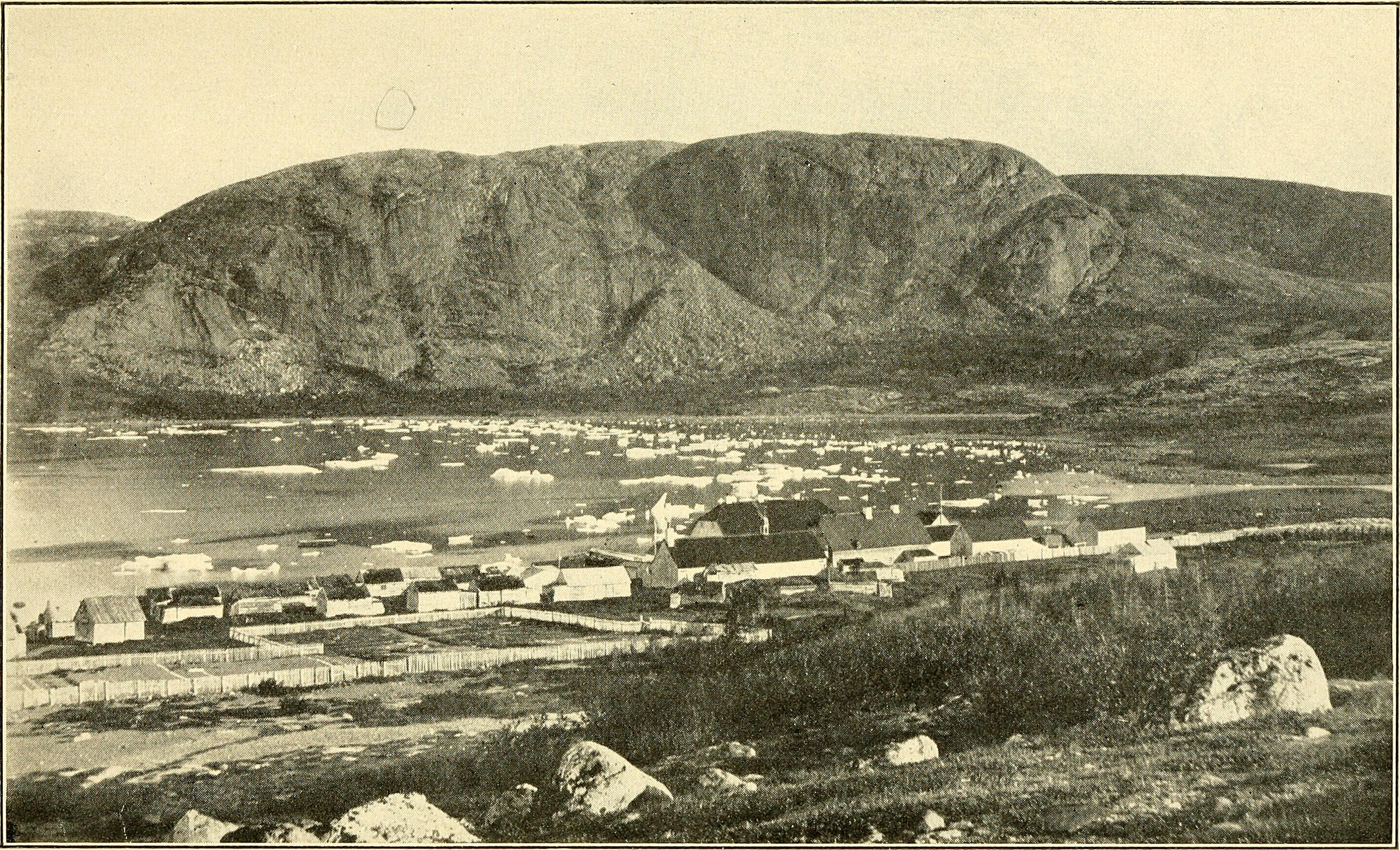
Nain in 1909.

Nain was first established in 1771 by Moravian missionaries. It is among the oldest permanent Inuit settlements in Canada: most communities in Nunavut and Nunavik were settled in the 1950s or later. It is also the second-oldest continuously-inhabited community in Labrador, after North West River. Nain has also been called "Nonynuke", "Nuninock" and "Nunaingoakh". The missionaries also established posts in Hopedale and areas in the north such as Hebron and Okak. The first Inuk to be baptized in Nain was a man named Kingminguse who took the name "Petrus" after conversion and then returned to southern Labrador where he used the name "Petrus Kingminguse" and died in 1800. Many Inuit in the south traveled to the Moravian posts in the north to be baptized and then returned to the south. The Moravians established posts only in northern areas since the Colony of Newfoundland hoped to colonize southern Labrador. In 1773, it was claimed that over 250 Inuit lived in Nain. In 1893, Nain's residents adopted patrilineal surnames at the request of Newfoundland courts. Many people took names of the missionaries (such as Kohlmeister and Townley) while others chose traditional names like Ingergajok, literally, "traveler".

In 1959, residents of Hebron and Nutak resettled to Nain, Hopedale, Makkovik and Happy Valley-Goose Bay. The relocation had a major impact on residents of Hebron and Nutak since the land in Nain (and other communities) was very different (resulting in difficulties when hunting) and many families were divided. Poverty and alcoholism has affected many of the families that originated in Hebron and Nutak. The provincial government apologized for the relocations in 2005. Many Inuit from Hebron were relocated to Nain by the provincial government after the Moravian mission at Hebron was closed under government pressure in 1959.

In 2016, the Google Street View imaging service uploaded images of various roads in Nain. Nain is one of the few communities in Labrador with images on the service.

=== Nunatsiavut ===
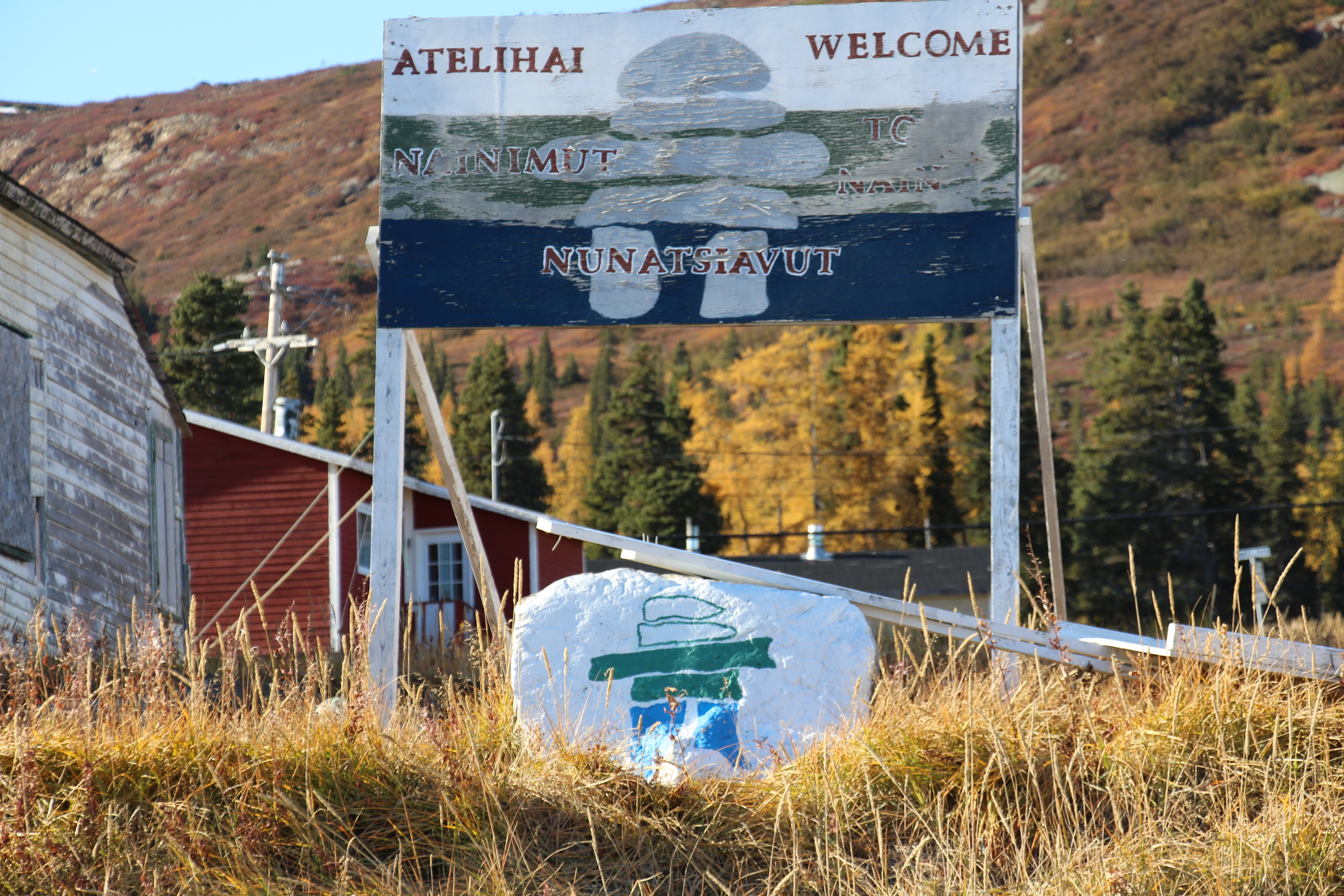
Welcome sign to Nain

On December 1, 2005, Nain became the administrative capital of the autonomous region of Nunatsiavut, the name chosen by the Labrador Inuit when the Labrador Inuit Land Claims Agreement Act was successfully ratified by the Canadian Government and the Inuit of Labrador. Hopedale, further south, is the legislative capital. The land claim cedes limited self-rule for the Nunatsiavut government in Northern Labrador and North-Eastern Quebec, granting title and aboriginal rights. The land that comprises the Nunatsiavut government is called the Labrador Inuit Settlement Area, or LISA, which amount to approximately 72,500 km^{2} (28,000 sq mi). The Inuit of Labrador do not own this land per se, but they do have special rights related to traditional land use as aboriginals. Nevertheless, the Labrador Inuit will own 15,000 km^{2} (5,800 sq mi) within the Settlement Area, officially designated as Labrador Inuit Lands. The Agreement also provides for the establishment of the Torngat Mountains National Park Reserve, consisting of about 9,600 square kilometres (3,700 sq mi) of land within LISA.

== Geography ==
Nain is located on the north side of Unity Bay, a small inlet. The bay is open to the Atlantic Ocean but Nain's harbour is protected by numerous islands, the largest of which is Paul's Island. From Nain to the open Labrador Sea is approximately 50 km (31 mi) east through Strathcona Run.

=== Climate ===
Although located at the same latitude as Ketchikan on North America's west coast, Oban on Scotland's West Coast, or Moscow and southern Scandinavia in Europe, the influence of the cold Labrador Current and situated to the East of a large Continental land mass, gives Nain a marginal subarctic climate (Dfc) that is very close to a polar climate (ET), which creates the southernmost tree line in the northern hemisphere on the adjacent coast. The southernmost tundra is actually still in a zone of discontinuous permafrost rather than the much more typical continuous zone. Due to the almost constant presence of the Icelandic Low, precipitation (rain and snow) is exceptionally heavy, even for a consistently cold, low-lying climate, with an average annual snowfall of 421.0 cm (165.7 in). The actual depth of snow on the ground averages 72 cm (28 in) at the end of March. Occasionally, very warm weather occurs in summer when winds blow offshore.

Climate data for Nain Airport Climate ID: 8502800; coordinates 56°33′02″N 61°40′56″W; elevation: 6.4 m (21 ft); WMO ID: 71902; 1991–2020 normals, extremes 1926–present
Month	Jan	Feb	Mar	Apr	May	Jun	Jul	Aug	Sep	Oct	Nov	Dec	Year
Record high humidex	9.0	6.6	9.0	12.8	24.5	38.1	40.2	35.6	32.0	19.9	10.6	4.8	40.2
Record high °C (°F)	10.5 (50.9)	7.6 (45.7)	12.1 (53.8)	14.5 (58.1)	25.6 (78.1)	33.3 (91.9)	33.3 (91.9)	32.7 (90.9)	29.0 (84.2)	23.9 (75.0)	11.7 (53.1)	6.7 (44.1)	33.3 (91.9)
Mean daily maximum °C (°F)	−13.1 (8.4)	−13.2 (8.2)	−7.1 (19.2)	−0.3 (31.5)	5.5 (41.9)	11.2 (52.2)	14.8 (58.6)	15.8 (60.4)	11.9 (53.4)	5.6 (42.1)	−1.0 (30.2)	−7.7 (18.1)	1.9 (35.4)
Daily mean °C (°F)	−17.1 (1.2)	−17.6 (0.3)	−11.9 (10.6)	−4.9 (23.2)	1.6 (34.9)	6.6 (43.9)	10.2 (50.4)	11.1 (52.0)	7.8 (46.0)	2.6 (36.7)	−4.0 (24.8)	−11.2 (11.8)	−2.2 (28.0)
Mean daily minimum °C (°F)	−21.1 (−6.0)	−22.0 (−7.6)	−16.8 (1.8)	−9.5 (14.9)	−2.4 (27.7)	2.0 (35.6)	5.6 (42.1)	6.5 (43.7)	3.7 (38.7)	−0.4 (31.3)	−7.0 (19.4)	−14.6 (5.7)	−6.3 (20.7)
Record low °C (°F)	−39.4 (−38.9)	−38.3 (−36.9)	−37.0 (−34.6)	−31.1 (−24.0)	−17.5 (0.5)	−6.7 (19.9)	−2.8 (27.0)	−2.8 (27.0)	−6.4 (20.5)	−19.0 (−2.2)	−24.4 (−11.9)	−41.5 (−42.7)	−41.5 (−42.7)
Record low wind chill	−52.9	−59.5	−54.0	−41.3	−20.8	−11.7	−4.8	0.0	−9.4	−31.2	−33.3	−55.5	−59.5
Average precipitation mm (inches)	74.1 (2.92)	61.6 (2.43)	74.0 (2.91)	68.8 (2.71)	55.6 (2.19)	74.7 (2.94)	105.1 (4.14)	79.8 (3.14)	77.5 (3.05)	72.4 (2.85)	62.1 (2.44)	68.0 (2.68)	870.9 (34.29)
Average rainfall mm (inches)	4.1 (0.16)	5.7 (0.22)	3.7 (0.15)	15.9 (0.63)	30.4 (1.20)	68.7 (2.70)	103.2 (4.06)	77.8 (3.06)	76.6 (3.02)	55.4 (2.18)	17.9 (0.70)	9.6 (0.38)	468.8 (18.46)
Average snowfall cm (inches)	68.2 (26.9)	57.4 (22.6)	71.3 (28.1)	54.2 (21.3)	28.0 (11.0)	10.3 (4.1)	0.0 (0.0)	0.0 (0.0)	2.3 (0.9)	21.0 (8.3)	44.3 (17.4)	64.3 (25.3)	421.0 (165.7)
Average precipitation days (≥ 0.2 mm)	14.9	11.9	13.0	13.7	13.3	15.2	17.0	16.4	15.4	15.1	13.4	12.7	172.0
Average rainy days (≥ 0.2 mm)	1.4	0.95	1.6	3.3	8.6	14.7	16.8	16.5	15.4	11.0	3.6	2.0	95.7
Average snowy days (≥ 0.2 cm)	14.2	11.4	12.8	12.2	8.2	2.6	0.0	0.0	0.76	7.4	11.8	12.5	93.8
Average relative humidity (%) (at 3pm)	66.6	63.9	65.4	68.7	70.8	69.4	71.5	70.5	66.7	70.6	72.7	70.3	68.9
Source: Environment Canada (rain/rain days, snow/snow days 1991–2012)

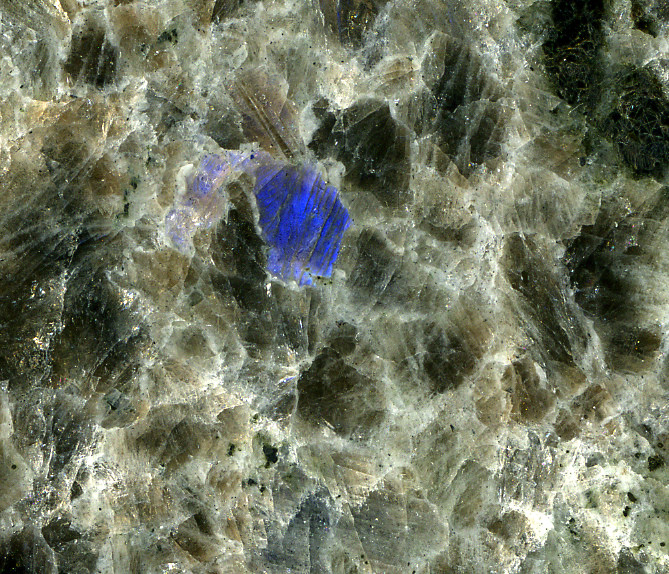
Anorthosite, marketed as "Blue Eyes Granite," from the Ten Mile Bay Quarry, near Nain. Every crystal will flash bright blue when tilted at the correct angle in the light, an optical effect called "labradorescence".

== Local government ==
Nain federal election results
Year	Liberal		Conservative		New Democratic		Green	
2021	34%	97	8%	24	56%	158	0%	0
2019	43%	176	9%	36	46%	191	2%	8

Nain provincial election results
Year	Liberal		PC		New Democratic	
2019	63%	304	37%	181	0%	0
2015	93%	289	3%	8	5%	14

The town is governed by a seven-member council composed of a mayor (or Angajukĸâk), deputy mayor (Deputy Angajukĸâk), and five councilors.

The Town Council formally changed its name from "Nain Town Council" to "Nain Inuit Community Government" in October 2006. The Nain Inuit Community Government meets once per month.

== Educational facilities ==
Nain has one kindergarten to level III school, Jens Haven Memorial, which is split between two buildings. One building contains primary grades (kindergarten to grade 3), the other houses elementary and secondary grades (grade 4 to Level III).

There is also an adult basic education (ABE) program offered in town, delivered by Academy Canada. Academy Canada delivers this program in Nain and throughout Labrador in communities including Happy Valley - Goose Bay, Hopedale, Labrador City, Natuashish and Sheshatshiu.

== Industry ==
Fishing is the main industry in Nain, owing to the influence of the Labrador Current off its shores. Traditional hunting and trapping activities continue through the winter months after the fishing season has ended.

The Voisey's Bay nickel mine is located about 35 km (22 mi) southwest of Nain.

== Demographics ==
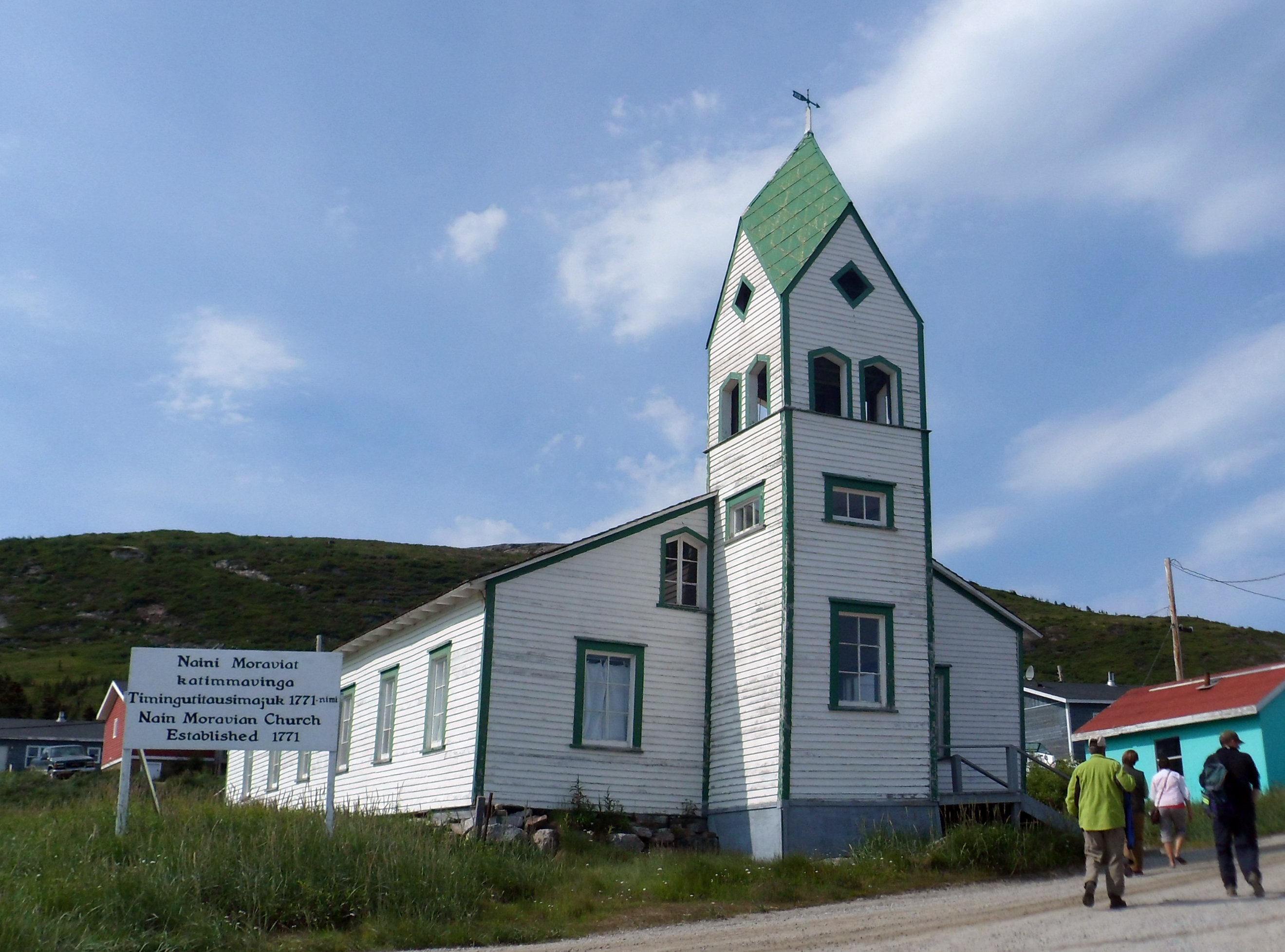
Moravian Church

In the 2021 Census of Population conducted by Statistics Canada, Nain had a revised population of 1,204 living in 350 of its 380 total private dwellings, a change of 7% from its 2016 population of 1,125. With a land area of 93.5 km^{2} (36.1 sq mi), it had a population density of 9.1/km^{2} (23.5/sq mi) in 2021.

=== Ethnicity ===
2016 Canadian census		Population	% of total population
Visible minority group Source:	South Asian	0	0.0
Visible minority group Source:	Chinese	0	0.0
Visible minority group Source:	Black	0	0.0
Visible minority group Source:	Filipino	0	0.0
Visible minority group Source:	Latin American	0	0.0
Visible minority group Source:	Southeast Asian	0	0.0
Visible minority group Source:	Other visible minority	0	0.0
Total visible minority population		0	0.0
Aboriginal group Source:	First Nations	25	2.2
Aboriginal group Source:	Métis	15	1.3
Aboriginal group Source:	Inuit	1,025	91.1
Total Aboriginal population		1,035	92.0
White		90	8.0
Total population		1,125	100.0

=== Language (2016 census) ===
- English: 810
- Inuktitut: 295

== Media ==
Nain has two radio services available.

CKOK-FM is a low-power (LP) re-broadcaster of CKHV broadcasting at 99.9 FM. Owned by the Okalakatiget Society, the station broadcasts a community radio format for the region's First Nations and Inuit communities.

As of the end of 2014, the station now streams online. It broadcasts live during local programming only.

There is also a local re-broadcaster of Happy Valley-Goose Bay's CBC Radio One feed, CBNZ. It operates on 740 AM.

== Transport ==
Nain is served by Nain Airport, with commercial flights to local Newfoundland towns primarily operated by Air Borealis (part of PAL Airlines). Longer-distance flights are also available from Happy Valley-Goose Bay.

Between mid-June and mid-November (pending ice conditions), the ferry MV Kamutik W, operated by the Newfoundland and Labrador Government, provides weekly service from Goose Bay along the Atlantic Coast, with stops in Rigolet, Makkovik, Postville, Hopedale and Natuashish. Nain is the northernmost stop on the route; the ferry stays docked at Nain for about three hours before beginning its southbound route.

== See also ==
- List of cities and towns in Newfoundland and Labrador
- List of historic places in Labrador
- Nain Airport
- Nunatsiavut
- Voisey's Bay Mine
