= Hebron, Newfoundland and Labrador =

Northernmost settlement in Labrador in Canada (1831–1959)

Hebron
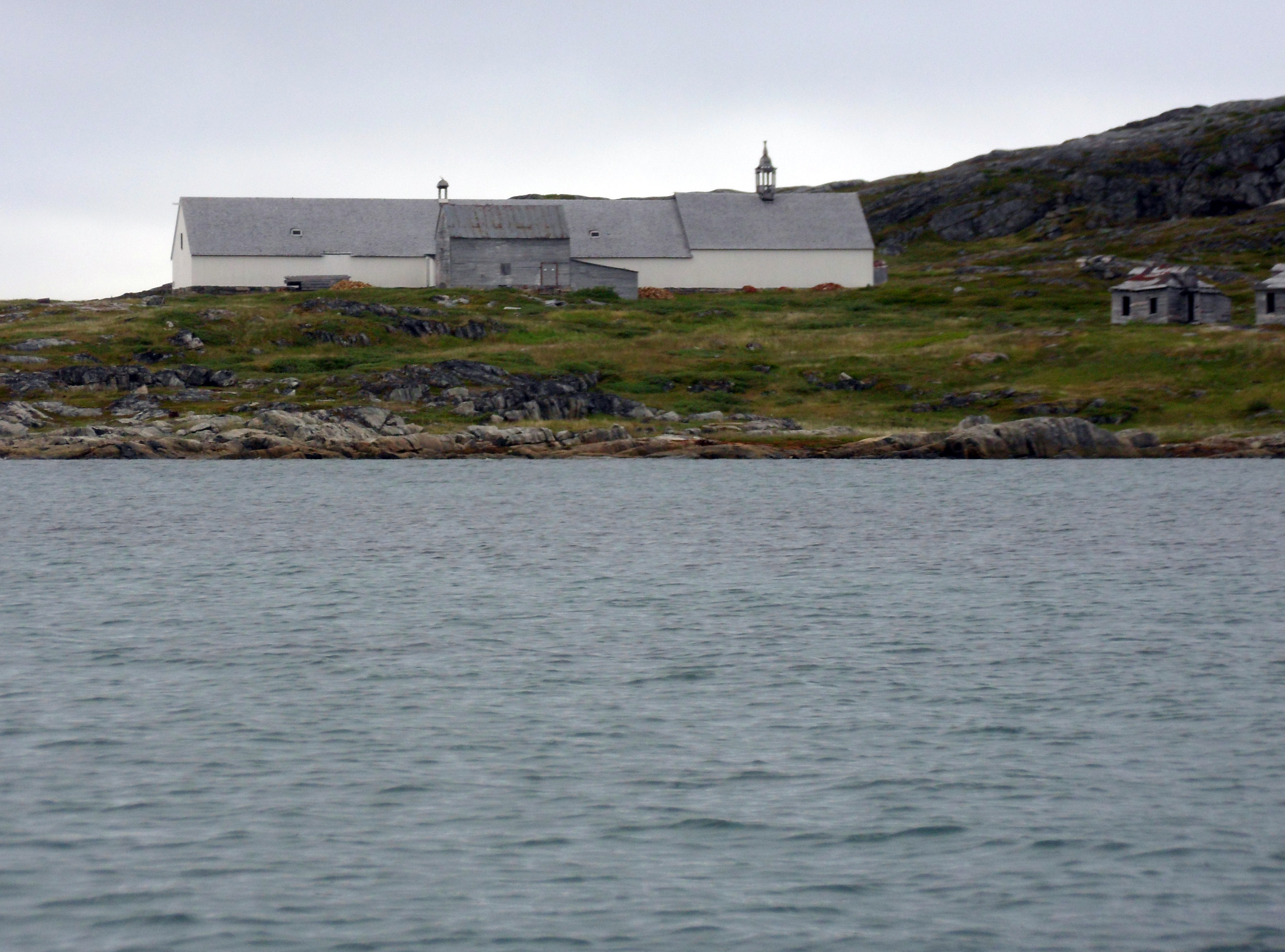
- Hebron Moravian mission in 2012

- Location within Canada Location within Newfoundland and Labrador
- 58°11′56″N 62°37′37″W
- Location: Newfoundland and Labrador, Canada

Site notes
- Governing body: Parks Canada

National Historic Site of Canada

Hebron (Nunatsiavummiutitut: Kangerdluksoak, Kangikluksoak or Kangertluksoak) was a Moravian mission and the northernmost settlement in Labrador. The traditional Nunatsiavummiutitut name for the area means "the Great Bay". Founded in 1831, the mission disbanded in 1959. The Inuk Abraham Ulrikab and his family, exhibited in human zoos in Europe in 1880, were from Hebron.

== History ==
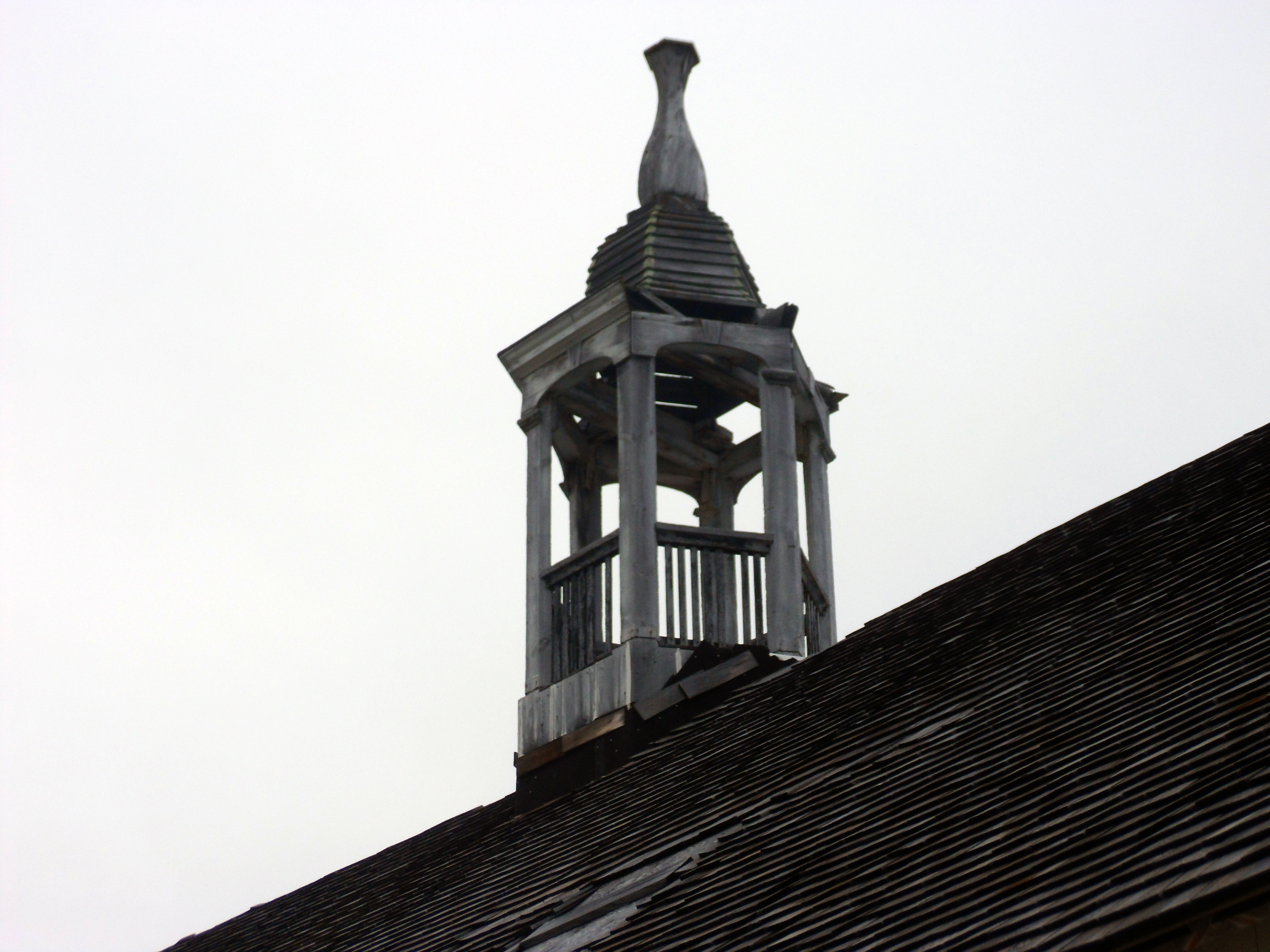
Hebron Moravian church cupola

Prior to European contact, Inuit from different regions used Hebron as a meeting place. It is used mainly as hunting and fishing grounds.

Moravians began establishing missions in Labrador in 1771. The first was located at Nain. The Moravians sought to evangelize the Inuit in Labrador.

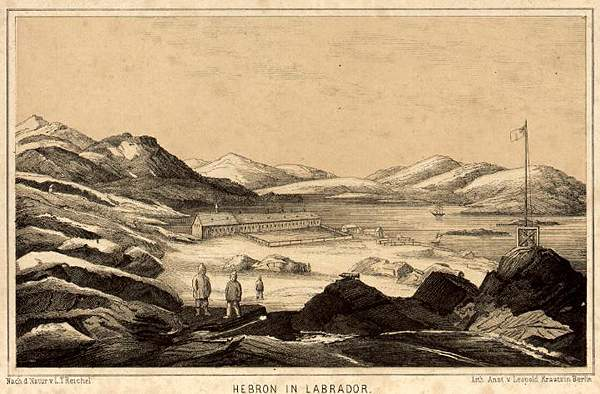
The mission at Hebron, Labrador, around 1860. Original drawing by Moravian Bishop Levin Theodor Reichel (1812-1878).

Mission work started at Hebron in 1818, a site located about 200 km (120 mi) north of Nain. It wasn't until 1827 that a small blockhouse was built as a seasonal outpost for missionaries. In 1831, temporary quarters having been completed, the first permanent missionaries were appointed to Hebron. The construction of the 53-meter-long, ten-metre-wide and one-storey-high building needed to house the church, the missionaries’ quarters and storage was started in spring 1835 and completed in October 1837. That building still dominates Hebron's landscape.

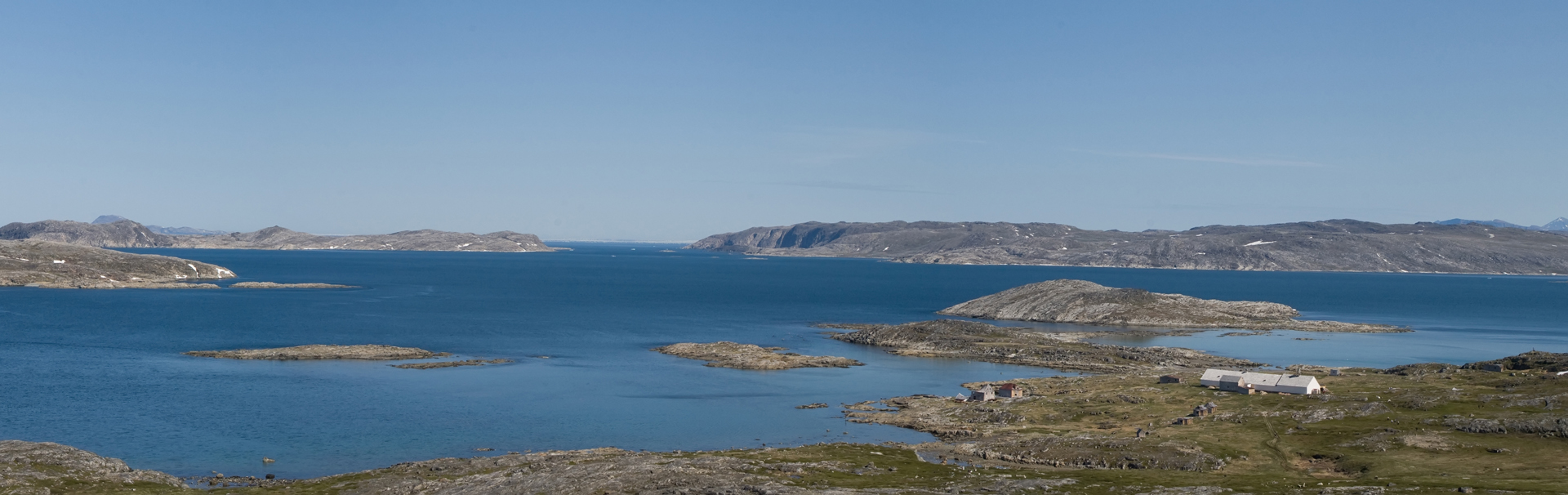
View of the Hebron Mission National Historic Site of Canada, July 2009

Inuit living in Hebron primarily relied on traditional subsistence activities. They lived in sod houses constructed with whalebone or wooden frame and seal-gut window.

Life was hard at the settlement. Epidemics of whooping cough, influenza and smallpox ran through the community periodically. Between the mid-1800s and early 1900s, the population in Hebron stayed at about 200 to 250 Inuit. In 1918, Moravian missionaries brought an outbreak of Spanish influenza that devastated Hebron and Okak. Approximately 86 of Hebron's 100 residents died. The flu epidemic of 1918 was believed to have wiped out a third of the 1,200-member Inuit population of Labrador.

In July 1943, US Army received permission from the Newfoundland government to secretly construct a weather station to improve Allies' weather forecasting in North Atlantic and Arctic oceans during WWII. The American soldiers stationed at Hebron also kept watch on the Moravian missionaries who were suspected of being sympathetic towards Germany. While the secret US weather station operated until February 1946, the existence of this station was made public in 2017 through the publication of a book.

=== Abandonment ===
In 1955, a member of the International Grenfell Association, an organization dedicated to the health and welfare of residents of Newfoundland and Labrador, wrote to the Government of Canada expressing concern about cramped living conditions at Hebron that had led to tuberculosis and a shortage of firewood.

After consultation with Moravian leaders, the decision was made to close the mission. The Inuit would be resettled into larger communities. "I see no other way than to suggest the Mission withdraw from Hebron this summer," said the Rev. Siegfried Hettasch. By April 1959, there were 58 families at Hebron. The decision was announced at an Easter Monday service in 1959. There was no consultation with community members.

By the fall of that year, half of the families had moved on their own. The remainder left soon after the Grenfell nurse was withdrawn and the community store closed in the fall of 1959. The relocation broke up extended families to different communities. Most were sent to Hopedale, Makkovik or Nain. Houses were not ready when the evictees arrived. When the accommodations were finally built, they were clustered in “little Hebron” villages, on the edges of the existing communities, reinforcing the isolation many Hebron Inuit already felt.

A report written for the Canadian Royal Commission on Aboriginal Peoples said the forced relocation led to poverty for several of the Inuit. "They were put in places where they weren't familiar with the local environment so they didn't know where to hunt, fish or trap and aside from that, all of the best places were already claimed by people who originally lived in those communities," said the report's author, Carol Brice-Bennett.

== Aftermath ==
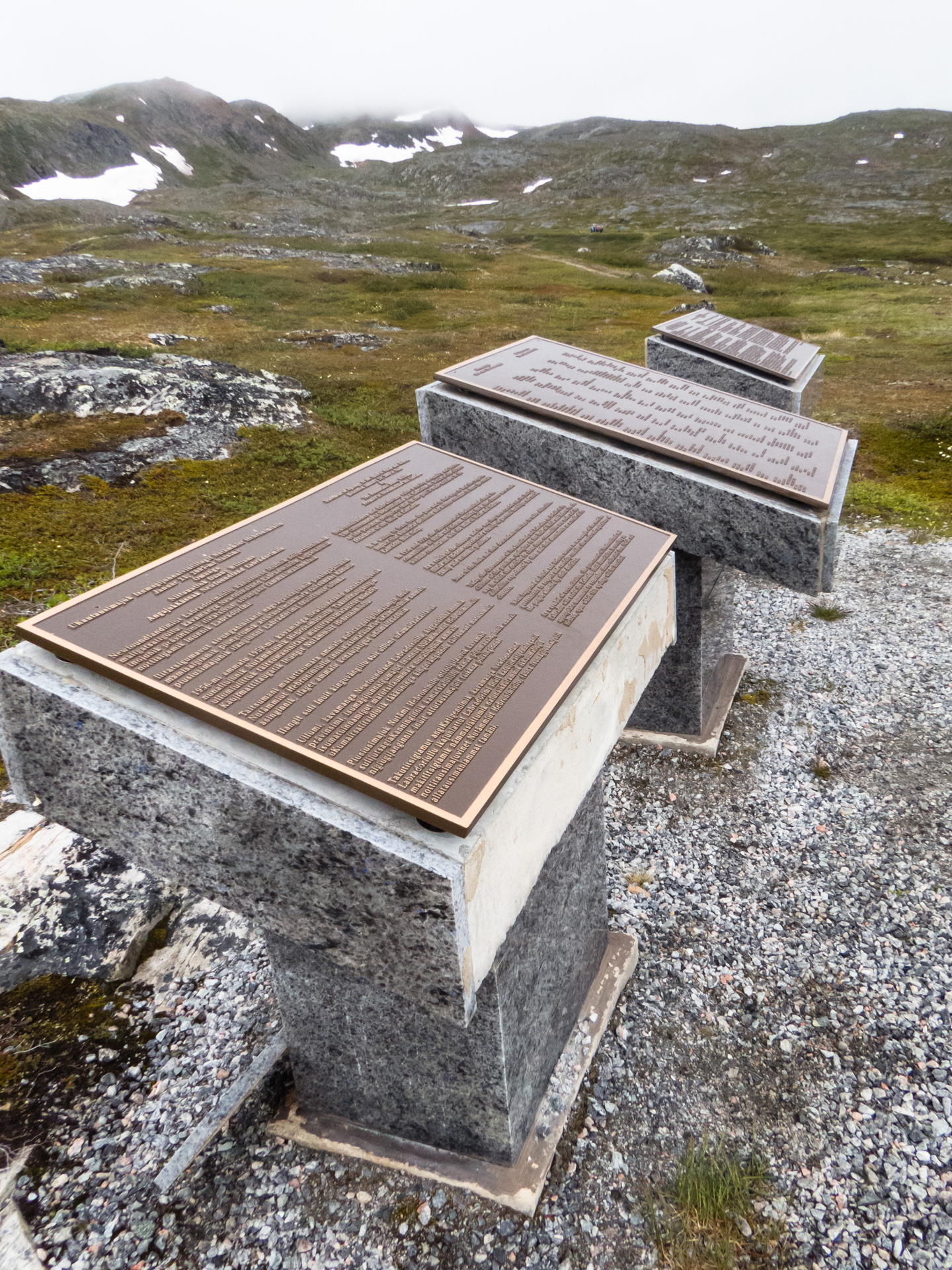
Monument unveiled in 2009 by the Newfoundland-and-Labrador government to apologize for the forced relocation of Inuit in 1959. July 2016.

The site was designated a National Historic Site of Canada in 1976. It is frequently visited by cruise ships.

The buildings of the original mission still stand. The main mission building has been undergoing renovation by Inuit volunteers and hired carpenters, who are evictees or their descendants, organized by Nunatsiavut government and are in reasonably good condition considering the passage of time.

In August 1999, the first reunion of the evictees was held in Hebron.

In 2005, Newfoundland and Labrador Premier Danny Williams apologized to Inuit affected by the relocations of Hebron and Nutak. In August 2009, the provincial government unveiled a monument at the site of Hebron with an inscribed apology for the site closure.

In May 2024, the Arctic Inspiration Prize awarded $298,000 to the Hebron and Nutak Reunions to provide an opportunity for the remaining able-bodied evictees to return to their homeland together at Hebron and Nutak/Okkak Bay in the summer of 2024.

== Climate ==
Hebron has a polar tundra climate (Köppen: ET). The site has an unusual sub-type of arctic (tundra) climate, characterized by relatively high average annual precipitation 798 mm (31.4 in) with half the precipitation occurring during the six coldest months (51% of the total falling from October through March). January, for example, averages -21 °C (-6 °F) and has 81 mm (3.2 in) of water-equivalent precipitation on average, perhaps the most humid air at that temperature experienced anywhere on earth.

Climate data for Hebron, Newfoundland and Labrador
Month	Jan	Feb	Mar	Apr	May	Jun	Jul	Aug	Sep	Oct	Nov	Dec	Year
Daily mean °C (°F)	−21.1 (−6.0)	−20.4 (−4.7)	−15 (5)	−7.2 (19.0)	−0.4 (31.3)	4.2 (39.6)	7.7 (45.9)	8.2 (46.8)	4.3 (39.7)	−0.7 (30.7)	−6.7 (19.9)	−15 (5)	−5.2 (22.6)
Average precipitation mm (inches)	81 (3.2)	56 (2.2)	79 (3.1)	43 (1.7)	47 (1.9)	65 (2.6)	84 (3.3)	70 (2.8)	81 (3.2)	52 (2.0)	63 (2.5)	77 (3.0)	798 (31.4)
Mean daily daylight hours	8.1	10.1	12.6	15.2	17.8	19.4	18.5	16	13.4	10.9	8.6	7.4	13.2
Source 1:
Source 2:

== Wildlife ==
The area features numerous fauna such as harp seals, ringed seals, bearded seals, walruses, beluga whales, polar bears, red foxes, otters, caribou, black bears, Arctic hare, Arctic char, cod, geese, eiders, mergansers, loons and harlequin ducks.
