= Legislative assemblies of Canadian provinces and territories =

This is a list of the legislative assemblies of Canada's provinces and territories. Each province's legislative assembly, along with the province's lieutenant governor, form the province's legislature (which is called a parliament or general assembly in some provinces). Historically, several provinces had bicameral legislatures, but they all eventually dissolved their upper house or merged it with their lower house, so that all provincial legislatures are now unicameral.

Members of the legislative assemblies of Canada's provinces and territories are called by various names. In most provinces and all three territories, they are called Members of the Legislative Assembly (MLAs) in English. In Ontario, they are called members of Provincial Parliament (MPPs); in Quebec, they are called members of the National Assembly (MNAs); and in Newfoundland and Labrador, they are called members of the House of Assembly (MHAs).

The legislative assembly with the most members is the National Assembly of Quebec, which consists of 125 MNAs. The provincial legislative assembly with the fewest members is the Legislative Assembly of Prince Edward Island, which consists of 27 MLAs. All of the legislative assemblies of Canada's territories have fewer members than that of Prince Edward Island.

== Current legislative assemblies ==
=== Provincial legislative assemblies ===
Province	Legislature name	Assembly name	Location	First minister	Members	Sessional Indemnity	Ref
Alberta	Legislature	Legislative Assembly (Note: In French: Assemblée législative.)	Edmonton	Premier (Note: In French: Premier ministre (masculine) or Première ministre (feminine).)	87 MLAs	$123,838.00	
British Columbia	Parliament	Legislative Assembly	Victoria	Premier	93 MLAs	$119,532.72	
Manitoba	Legislature	Legislative Assembly	Winnipeg	Premier	57 MLAs	$109,268.00	
New Brunswick	Legislature	Legislative Assembly	Fredericton	Premier	49 MLAs	$93,126	
Newfoundland and Labrador	General Assembly	House of Assembly	St. John's	Premier	40 MHAs	$95,357	
Nova Scotia	General Assembly	House of Assembly	Halifax	Premier	55 MLAs	$89,234.90	
Ontario	Parliament (List)	Legislative Assembly	Toronto	Premier	124 MPPs	$157,350	
Prince Edward Island	General Assembly	Legislative Assembly	Charlottetown	Premier	27 MLAs	$54,885	
Quebec	Parliament	National Assembly (Note: In French: Assemblée nationale.)	Quebec City	Premier	125 MNAs	$141,625	
Saskatchewan	Legislature	Legislative Assembly	Regina	Premier	61 MLAs	$109,576	

=== Territorial assemblies ===
Territory	Legislature name	Assembly name	Location	First minister	Members	Sessional Indemnity	Ref
Northwest Territories	Legislature (List)	Legislative Assembly (Note: 10 other official names: Assemblée législative des Territoires du Nord-Ouest (French), Beba Ɂełígíth Ɂeła Déłtthʼı Kų́é (Chipewyan), ᒪᓕᒐᓕᐅᖅᑎᑦ (Inuktitut), K'áowe gogha ełek'éterewe ke łénakedé (North Slavey), Gogha Sombaa Nálée (South Slavey), Ekʼètehtsodǫ Łegehdı̀ Kǫ̀ (Tlicho), Ihumiurviat Malirutaliatigun (Inuinnaqtun), Dagwidįį'è' Tr'igwahtsii Geenjit Nadhat Kat" (Gwichʼin), Legislative Assemblitkut (Inuvialuktun).)	Yellowknife	Premier	19 MLAs	$119,532.72	
Nunavut	Legislature (List)	Legislative Assembly (Note: In Inuktut: ᓄᓇᕗᒥ ᒪᓕᒐᓕᐅᕐᕕᐊ.)	Iqaluit	Premier (Note: In Inuktut: ᓯᕗᓕᖅᑎ.)	22 MLAs		
Yukon	Legislature (List)	Legislative Assembly	Whitehorse	Premier	21 MLAs	$96,045	

=== Autonomous area assemblies ===
Area	Government name	Assembly name	Location	First minister	Members	Ref
Déline District	Déline Gotʼine Government	Déline Kʼaowǝdó Kǝ (Note: Literal translation: "Déline Highest Leaders Group".)	Déline	Ɂekwʼahtidǝ (Note: Literal translation: "Highest Honest Leader".)	12 members	
Haida Gwaii	Council of the Haida Nation (Note: In Haida: X̱aaydaG̱a Waadlux̱an Naay.)	House of Assembly	Hlg̱aagilda	President	14 members	
Nisg̱aʼa Nation	Nisg̱aʼa Lisims Government	Wilp Siʼayuukhl Nisg̱aʼa	Gitlax̱tʼaamiks	Executive chairperson	36 members	
Nunatsiavut	Nunatsiavut Kavamanga Government	Nunatsiavut Assembly	Hopedale	First Minister	18 MNAs	
Tlaʼamin Nation	Tlaʼamin Government	General Assembly	Powell River	Tlaʼamin Government Hegus	9 officials	
Tłı̨chǫ Ndé	Tłı̨chǫ Government	Tłı̨chǫ Ndekʼàowo Assembly	Behchokǫ̀	Grand Chief	13 members	

=== Gallery ===
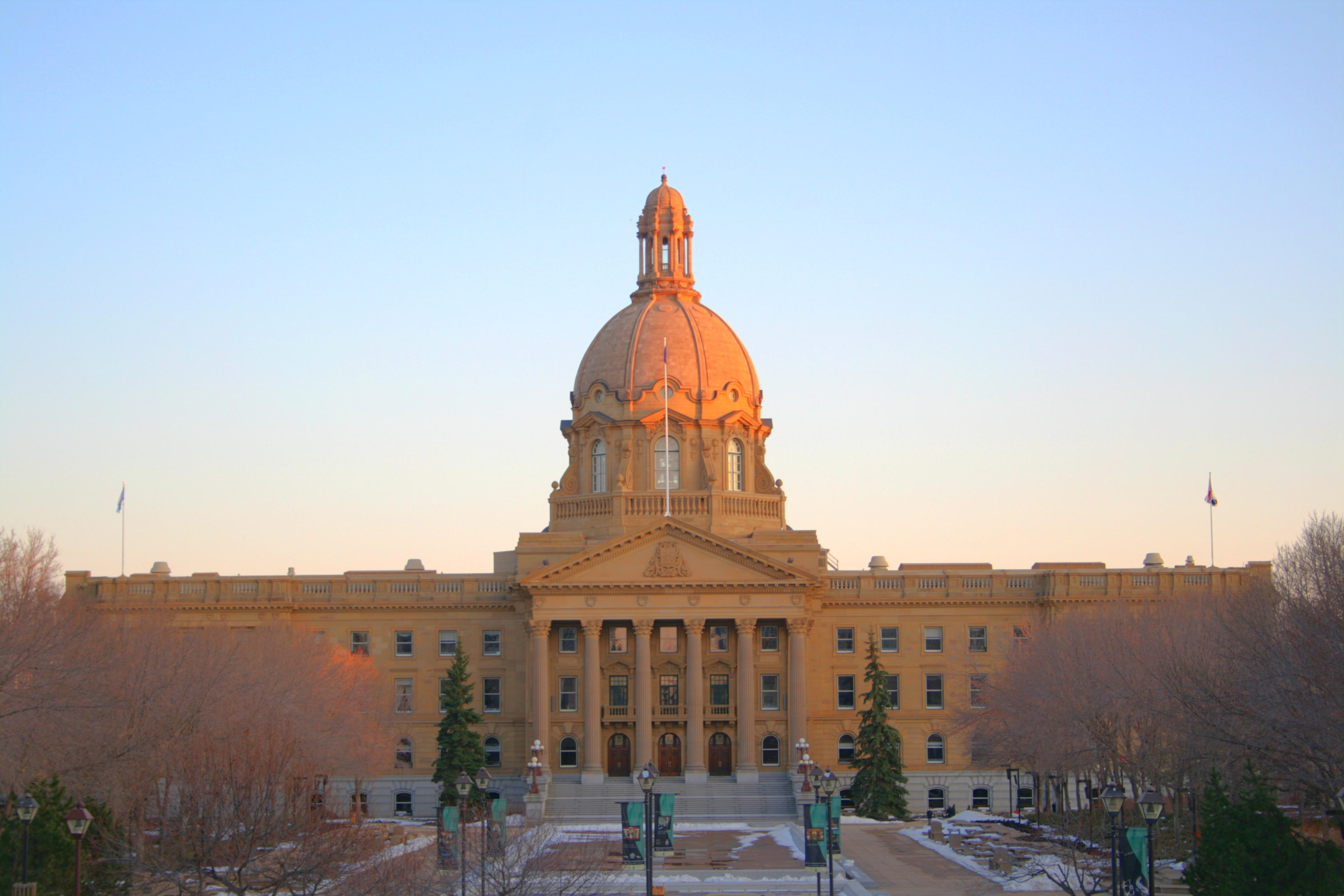
Legislative Assembly of Alberta

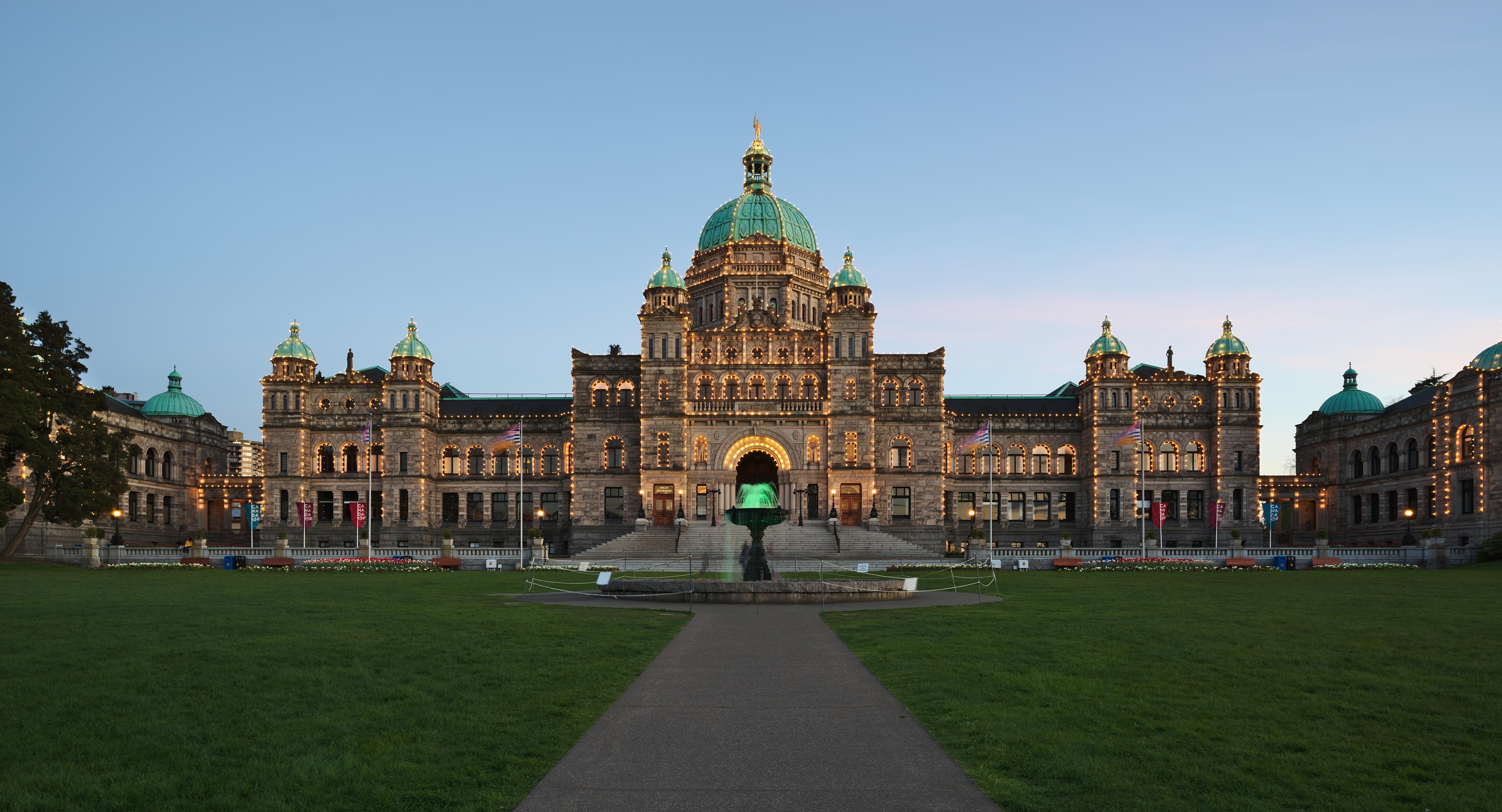
Legislative Assembly of British Columbia

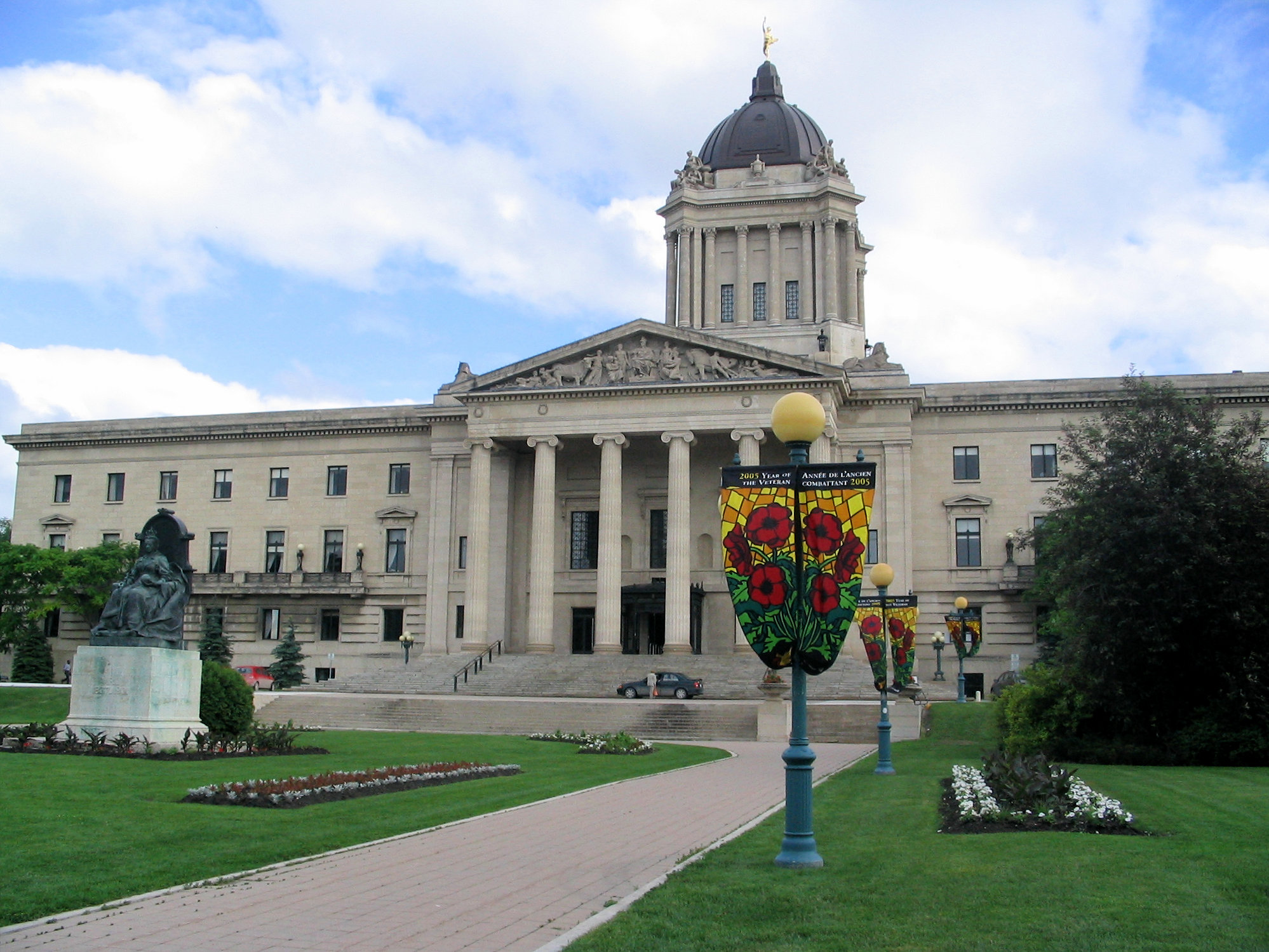
Legislative Assembly of Manitoba

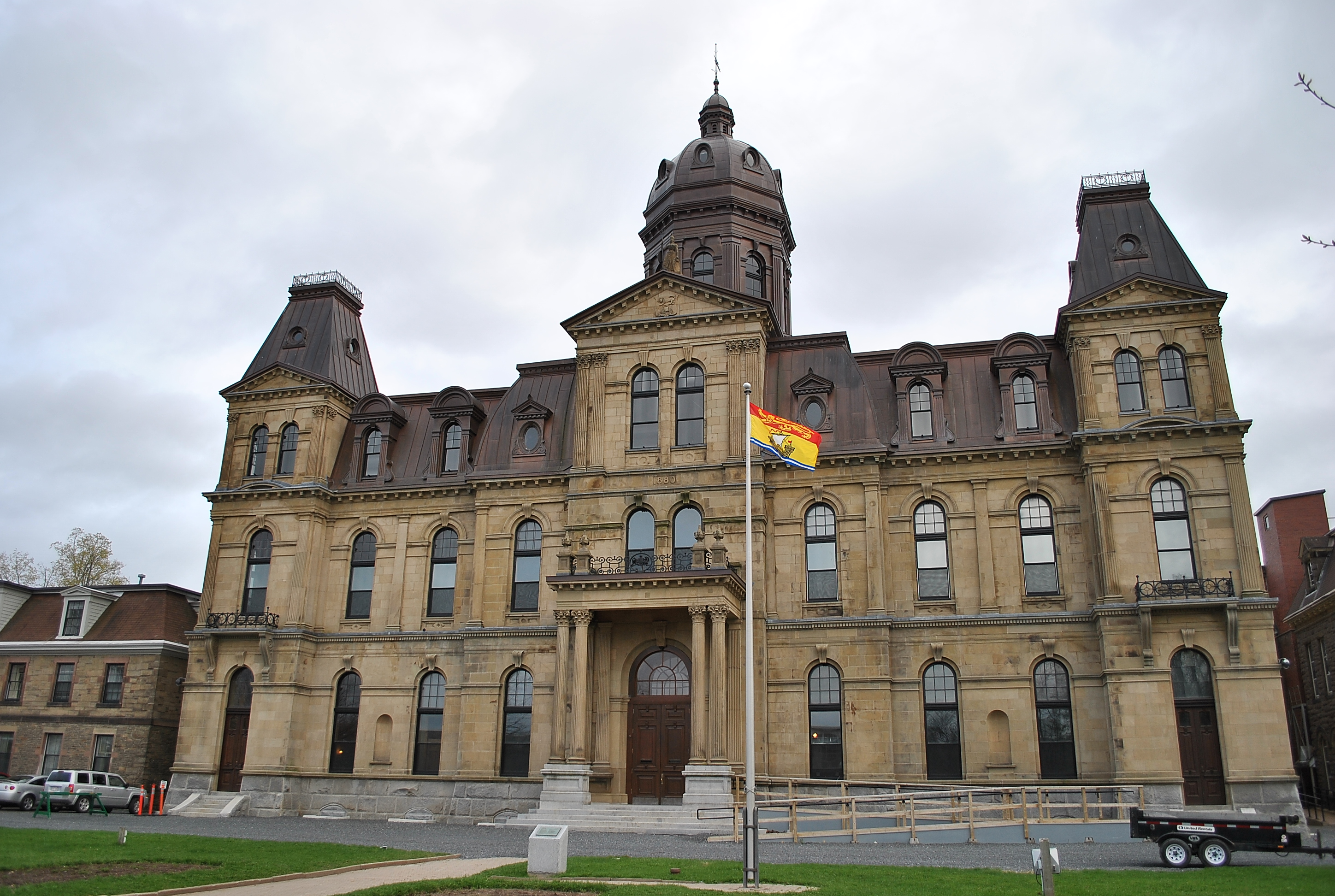
Legislative Assembly of New Brunswick

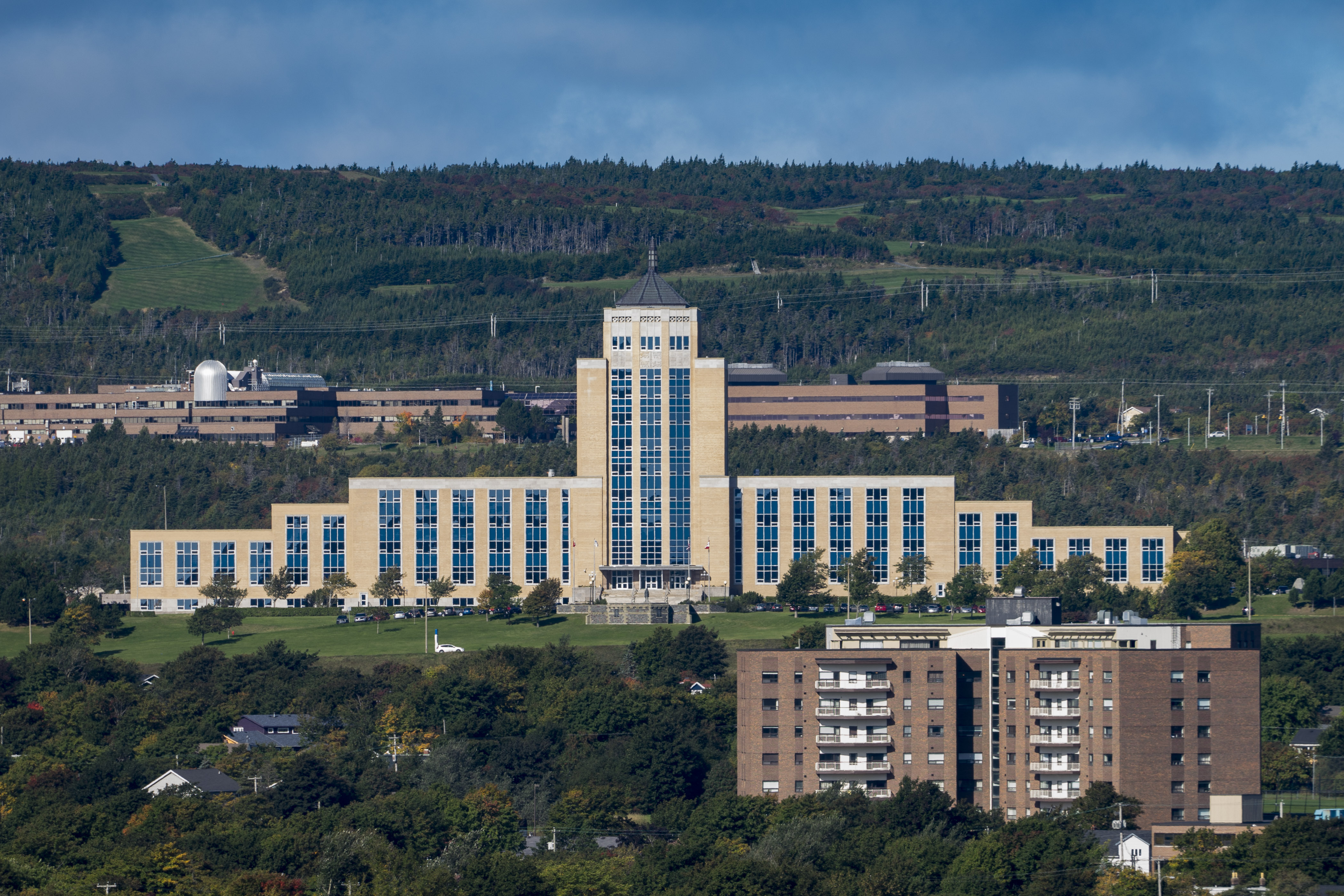
Newfoundland and Labrador House of Assembly

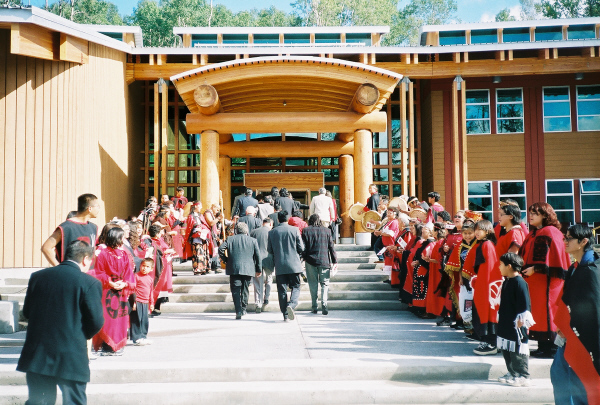
Wilp Siʼayuukhl Nisg̱aʼa

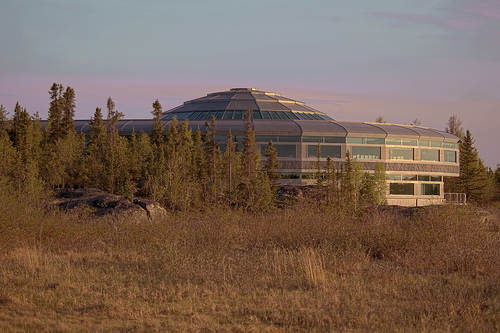
Legislative Assembly of the Northwest Territories

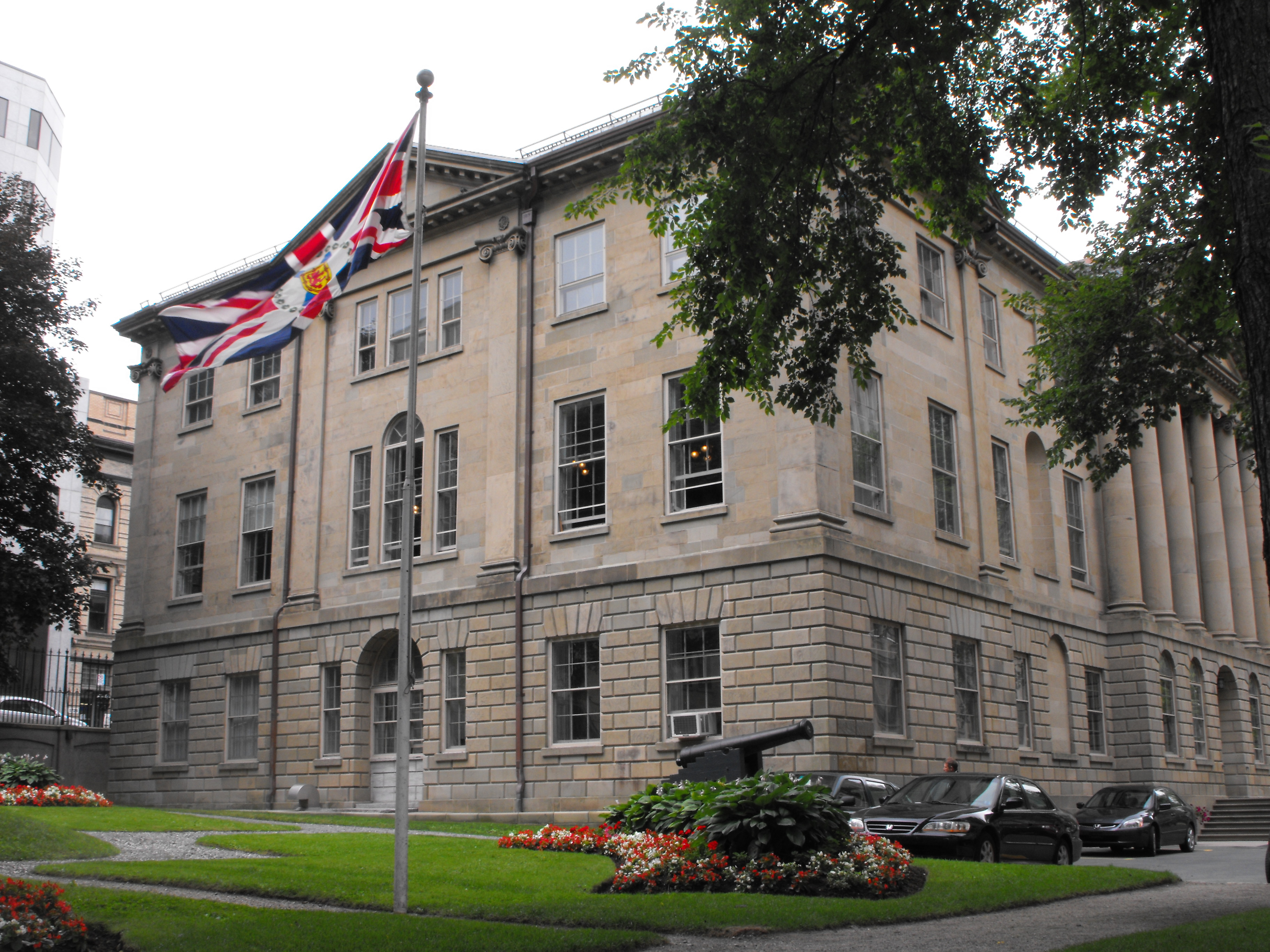
Nova Scotia House of Assembly

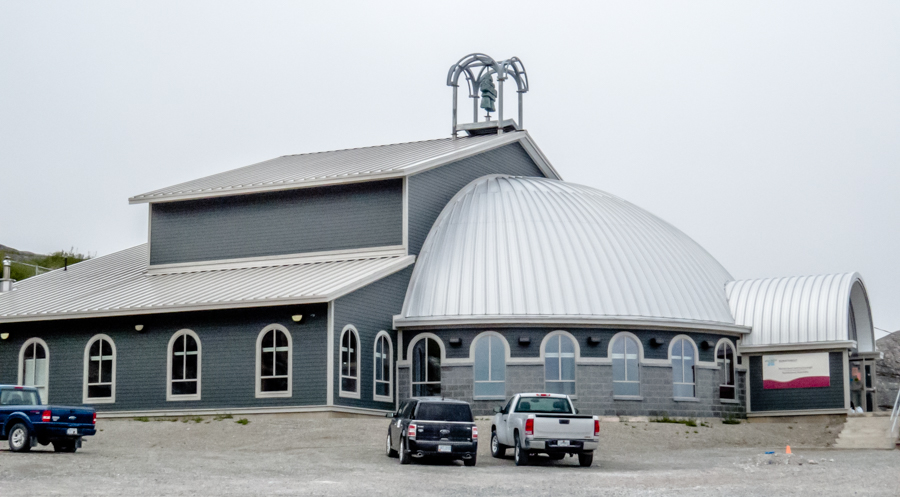
Nunatsiavut Assembly

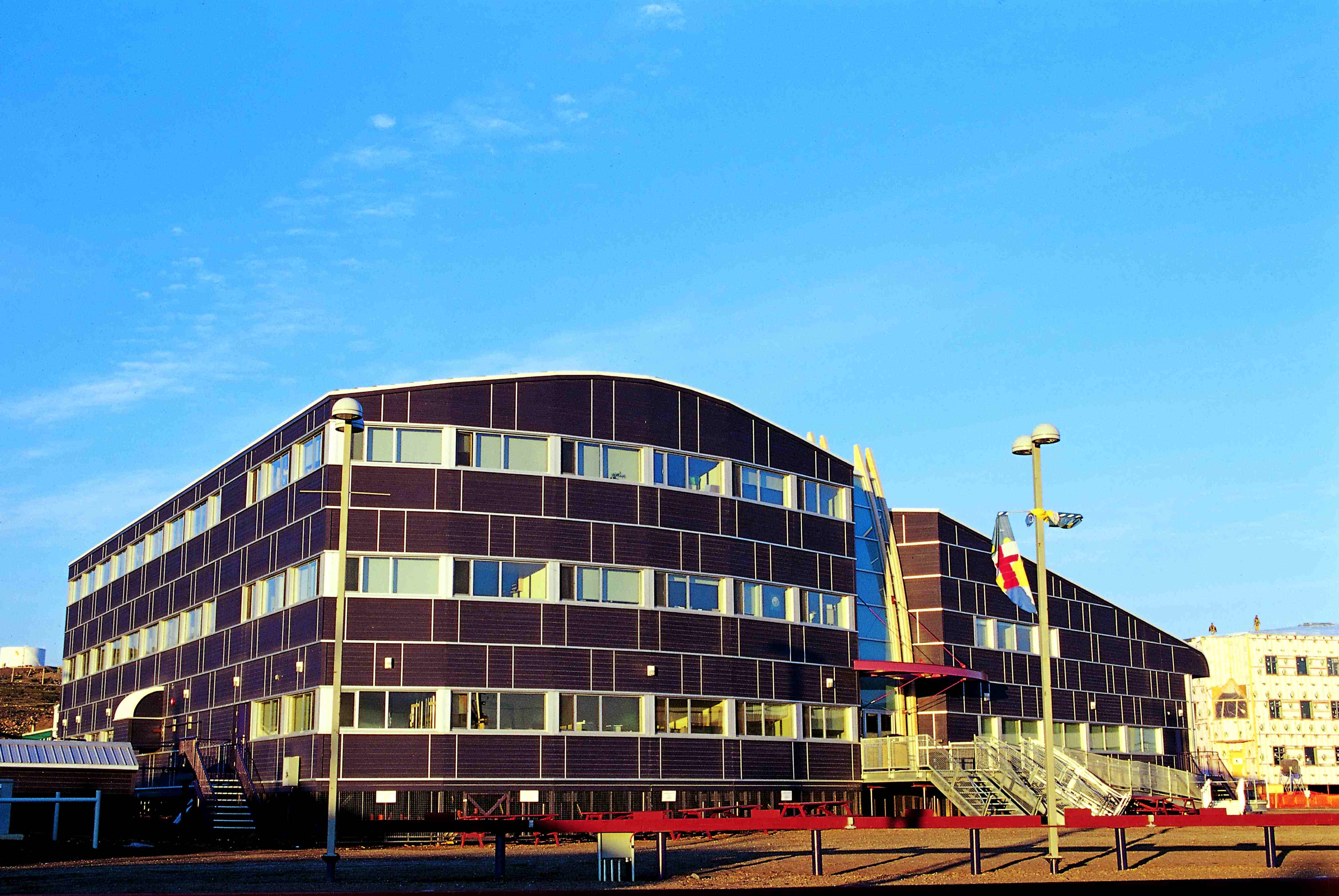
Legislative Assembly of Nunavut

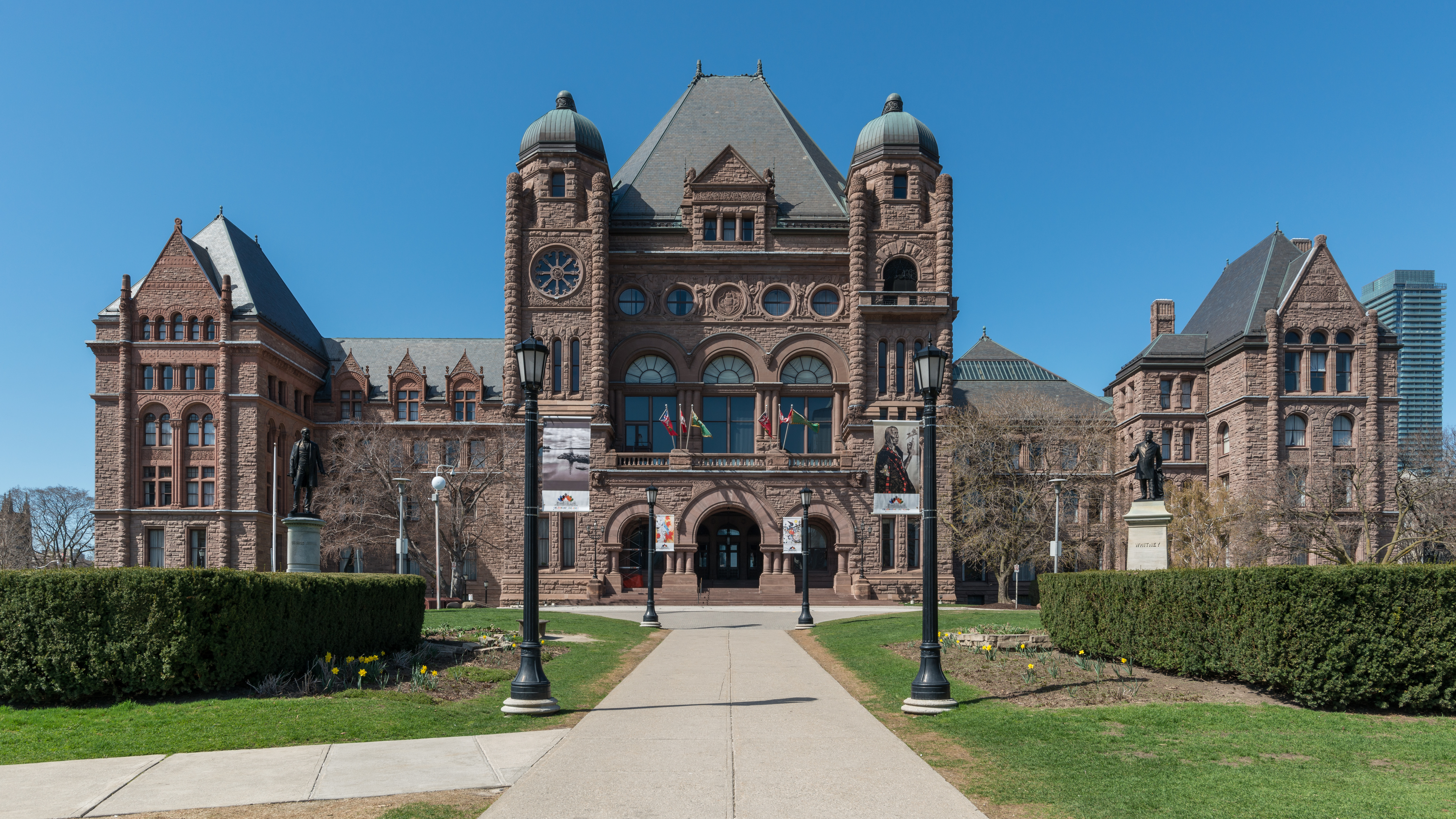
Legislative Assembly of Ontario

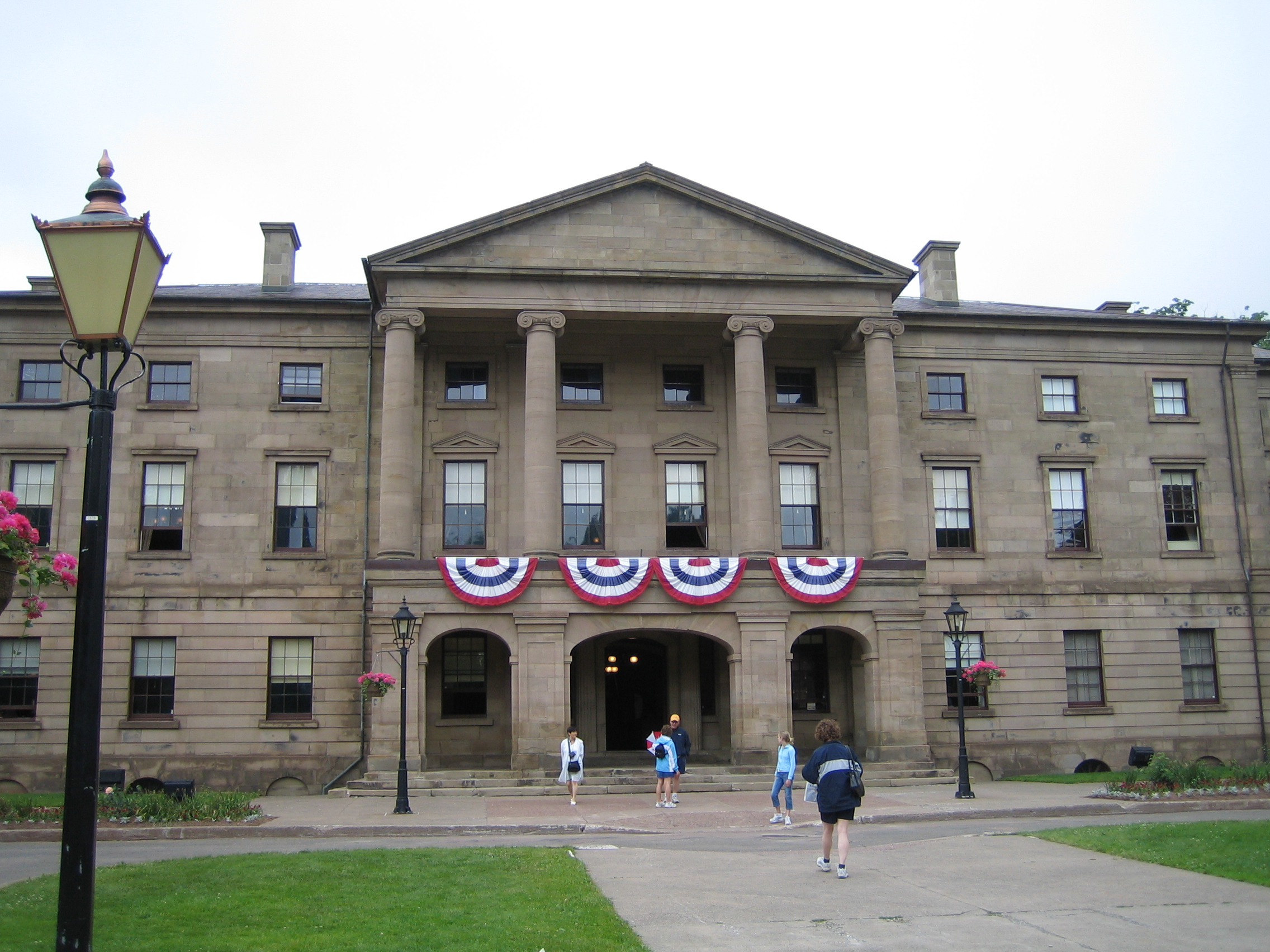
Legislative Assembly of Prince Edward Island

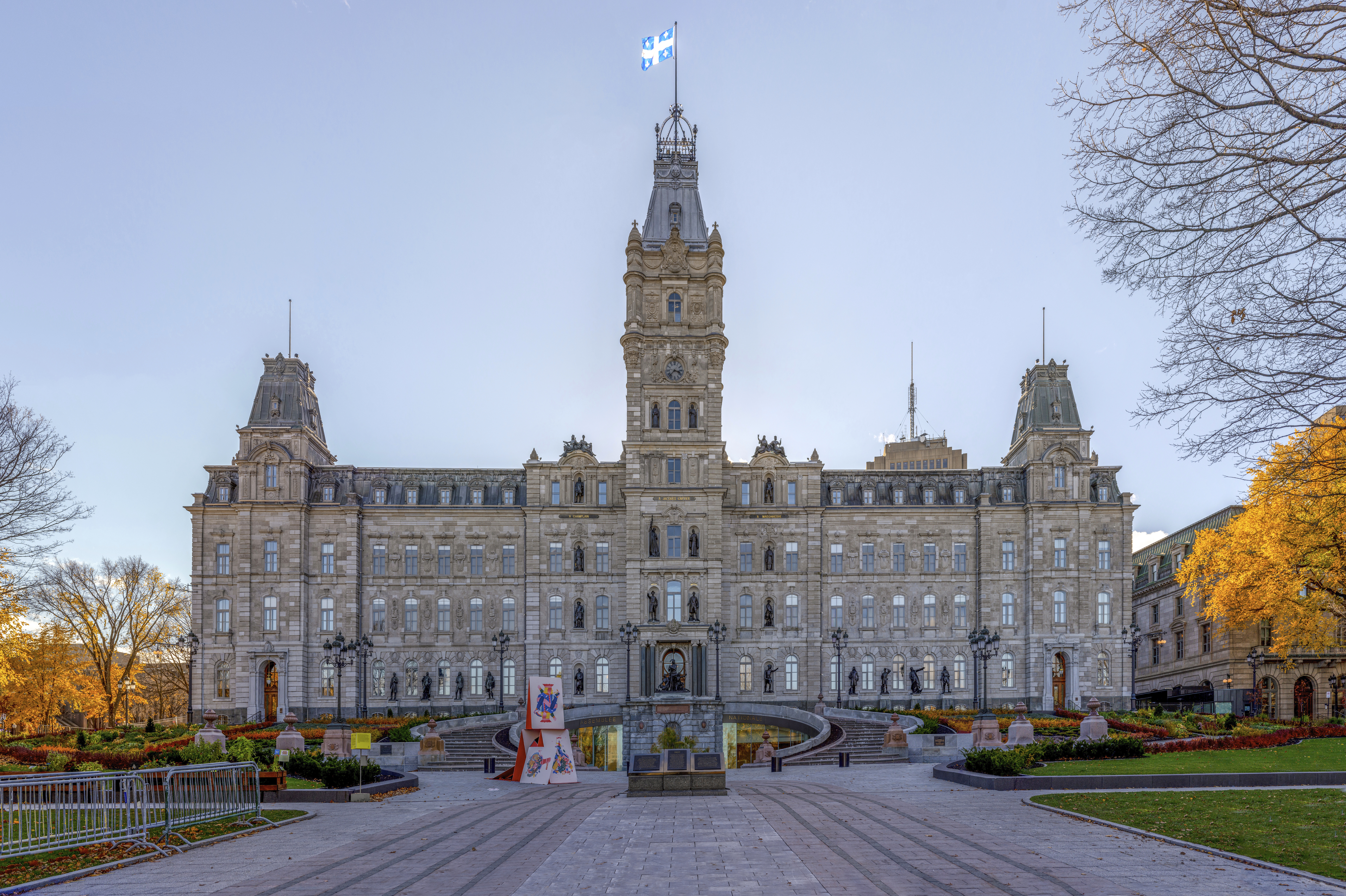
National Assembly of Quebec

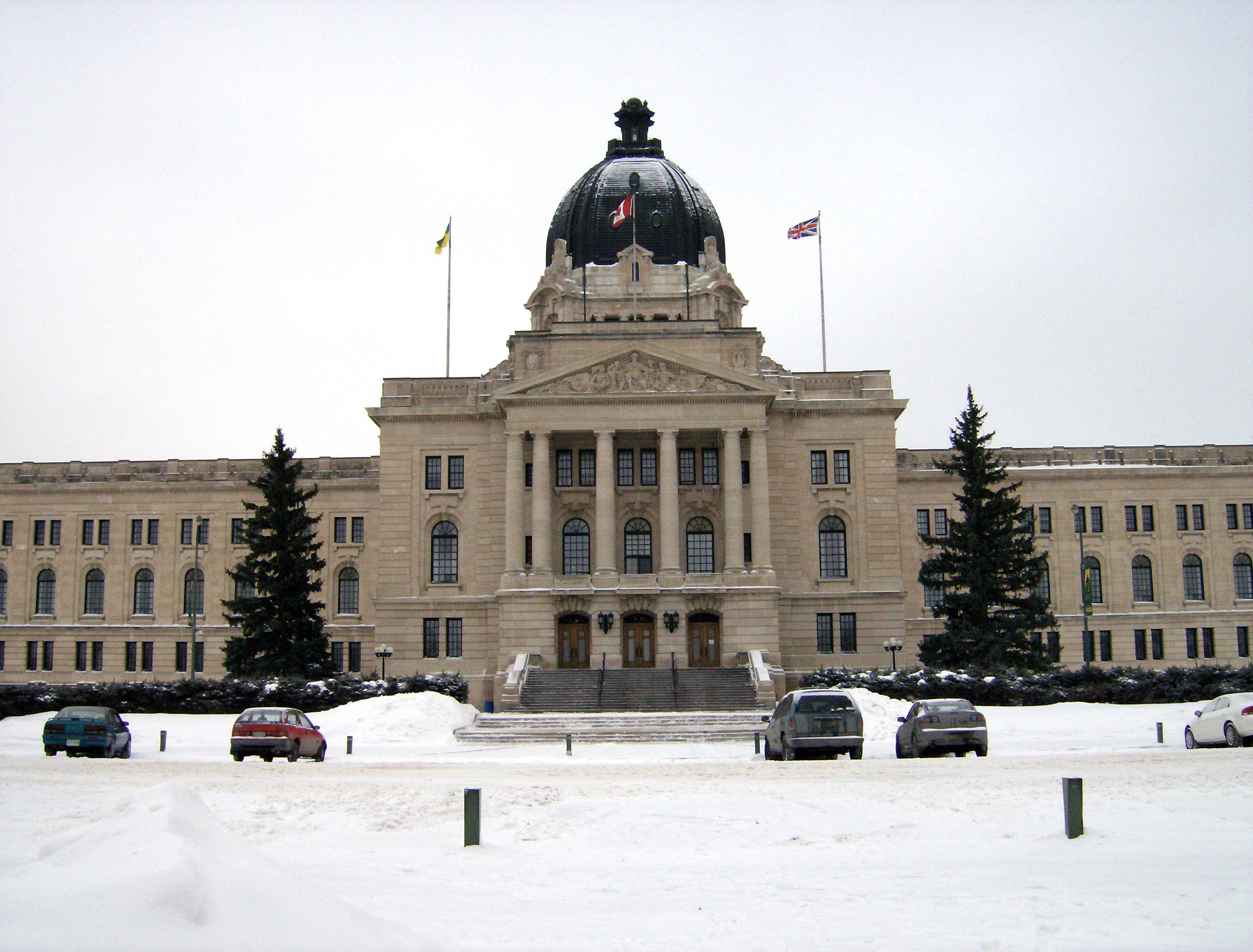
Legislative Assembly of Saskatchewan

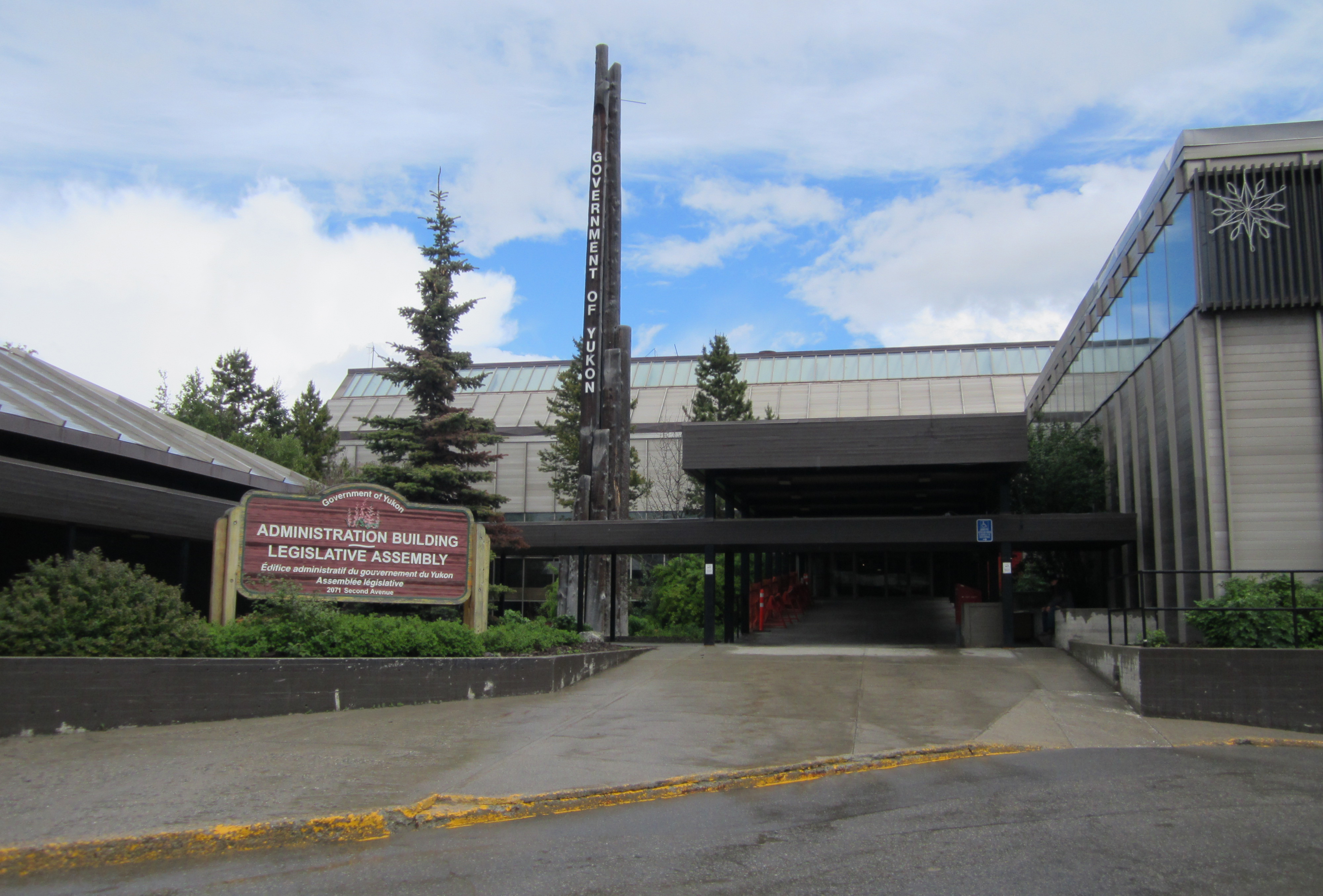
Yukon Legislative Assembly

=== Current composition of legislative assemblies ===
In the table below, the parties with shading form part of the provincial government whilst the parties in bold have official party status.

Provincial legislative assemblies
Province	Seats (majority)	Green	Liberal	NDP	PC	Other parties (governing)	Other parties (in opposition)	Ind.	Last election	Next election
Alberta	**87** (44)	-	-	**39**	-	UCP **46**	PT **1**	-	2023	32nd
British Columbia	**93** (47)	**2**	-	**27**	-	CPBC **64**	-	-	2026	45th
Manitoba	**57** (29)	-	**1**	**33**	**20**	-	-	**2**	2023	44th
New Brunswick	**49** (25)	**2**	**31**	-	**16**	-	-	-	2024	42nd
Newfoundland and Labrador	**40** (21)	-	**15**	**2**	**20**	-	-	**3**	2025	53rd
Nova Scotia	**55** (28)	-	**3**	**9**	**42**	-	-	**1**	2024	66th
Ontario	**124** (63)	**2**	**14**	**26**	**78**	-	-	**2**	2025	45th
Prince; Edward Island	**27** (14)	**3**	**4**	-	**18**	-	-	**1**	2023	68th
Quebec	**125** (63)	-	**39**	-	-	PQ **60**	PCQ **19,** QS **9**	-	2026	45th
Saskatchewan	**61** (31)	-	-	**26**	-	Sask. **34**	-	**1**	2024	31st

Territorial legislative assemblies
Territory	Seats (majority)	Consensus	Liberal	NDP	Other parties (governing)	Last election	Next election
Northwest; Territories	**19** (10)	19	-	-	-	2023	26th
Nunavut	**22** (12)	22	-	-	-	2025	8th
Yukon	**21** (11)	-	**1**	**6**	Yukon **14**	2025	41st

== Past legislative chambers ==
=== Past legislative chambers of provinces and territories ===
British Columbia
Period	Lower house	Upper house	Viceroy	Parliament
1849-1866	Split into Colonies of Vancouver Island and British Columbia (mainland).			
1866–1871	—N/a	Legislative Council of British Columbia*	Governor of the United Colony of British Columbia	Governor-in-Council
1871–present	Legislative Assembly of British Columbia	—N/a	Lieutenant governor of British Columbia	Parliament of British Columbia

*Included some elected members, but did not have responsible government.

Manitoba
Period	Lower house	Upper house	Viceroy	Parliament
1670-1821	Part of Rupert's Land (now Northwest Territories).			
1821-1870	—N/a	Council of Assiniboia	Governor of Red River Colony and Assiniboia District	Governor-in-Council
1870	Legislative Assembly of Assiniboia	—N/a	—N/a	—N/a
1870–1876	Legislative Assembly of Manitoba	Legislative Council of Manitoba	Lieutenant Governor of Manitoba and the North-West Territories	Legislature of Manitoba
1876–1905	Legislative Assembly of Manitoba	—N/a	Lieutenant Governor of Manitoba and Keewatin	Legislature of Manitoba
1905–present	Legislative Assembly of Manitoba	—N/a	Lieutenant governor of Manitoba	Legislature of Manitoba

New Brunswick
Period	Lower house	Upper house	Viceroy	Parliament
1763–1784	Part of Nova Scotia.			
1784–1891	Legislative Assembly of New Brunswick	Legislative Council of New Brunswick	Lieutenant governor of New Brunswick	New Brunswick Legislature
1891–present	Legislative Assembly of New Brunswick	—N/a	Lieutenant governor of New Brunswick	New Brunswick Legislature

Newfoundland and Labrador
Period	Lower house	Upper house	Viceroy	Parliament
1655–1713	—N/a	—N/a	Governor of Plaisance	—N/a
1713–1770	—N/a	—N/a	Lieutenant Governor of Placentia	—N/a
1770–1825	—N/a	—N/a	—N/a (see Commodore-Governor)	—N/a
1825–1833	—N/a	—N/a	Governor of Newfoundland	—N/a
1833–1934	Newfoundland House of Assembly	Legislative Council of Newfoundland	Governor of Newfoundland	General Assembly of Newfoundland
1934–1949**	—N/a	Commission of Government	Governor of Newfoundland	Governor-in-Council
1949–present*	Newfoundland and Labrador House of Assembly	—N/a	Lieutenant Governor of Newfoundland and Labrador	General Assembly of Newfoundland and Labrador

* Labrador was added to the name of the province in 2001. Before then, the bodies were the Newfoundland House of Assembly, Lieutenant Governor of Newfoundland, and General Assembly of Newfoundland.

  - Prior to 1949, Newfoundland and Labrador was an independent Dominion of the British Empire.

Northwest Territories
Period	Lower house	Upper house	Viceroy	Parliament
1670–1821	—N/a	—N/a	Governor of Rupert's Land	—N/a
1821–1839	—N/a	—N/a	Governor of Rupert's Land Northern Department	—N/a
1839–1870	—N/a	—N/a	Governor-in-Chief of Rupert's Land	—N/a
1870–1876	—N/a	Temporary North-West Council	Lieutenant Governor of Manitoba and the North-West Territories	Governor-in-Council
1876–1888	—N/a	1st Council of the Northwest Territories	Lieutenant governor of the North-West Territories	Governor-in-Council
1888–1905	North-West Legislative Assembly	—N/a	Lieutenant governor of the North-West Territories	Governor-in-Council
1905–1951	—N/a	2nd Council of the Northwest Territories	Governor General of Canada as represented by the Commissioner of the Northwest Territories	Commissioner-in-Council
1951–2014	Legislative Council of the Northwest Territories	—N/a	Governor General of Canada as represented by the Commissioner of the Northwest Territories	Commissioner-in-Council
2014–present	Northwest Territories Legislative Assembly	—N/a	Governor General of Canada as represented by the Commissioner of the Northwest Territories	Legislature of the Northwest Territories

Nova Scotia
Period	Lower house	Upper house	Viceroy	Parliament
1603–1713	—N/a	—N/a	Governor of Acadia	—N/a
1713–1720	—N/a	—N/a	Governor of Nova Scotia and Placentia	—N/a
1720–1758	—N/a	Nova Scotia Council	Governor of Nova Scotia and Placentia	Governor-in-Council
1758–1786	Nova Scotia House of Assembly	Nova Scotia Council	Governor of Nova Scotia	General Assembly of Nova Scotia
1786-1838	Nova Scotia House of Assembly	Nova Scotia Council	Lieutenant Governor of Nova Scotia	General Assembly of Nova Scotia
1838–1928	Nova Scotia House of Assembly	Legislative Council of Nova Scotia	Lieutenant Governor of Nova Scotia	General Assembly of Nova Scotia
1928–present	Nova Scotia House of Assembly	—N/a	Lieutenant Governor of Nova Scotia	General Assembly of Nova Scotia

Nunavut
Period	Lower house	Upper house	Viceroy	Parliament
1670–1999	Part of Northwest Territories and its preceding territories.			
1999–present	Legislative Assembly of Nunavut	—N/a	Governor General of Canada as represented by the Commissioner of Nunavut	Legislature of Nunavut

Ontario
Period	Lower house	Upper house	Viceroy	Parliament
1627–1791	Part of the Province of Quebec.			
1791–1841	Legislative Assembly of Upper Canada	Legislative Council of Upper Canada	Lieutenant Governor of Upper Canada	Parliament of Upper Canada
1841–1867	Part of the Province of Canada colony.			
1867–present	Legislative Assembly of Ontario	—N/a	Lieutenant Governor of Ontario	Parliament of Ontario

Prince Edward Island
Period	Lower house	Upper house	Viceroy	Parliament
1763–1769	Part of Nova Scotia.			
1769–1786	House of Assembly of Prince Edward Island	Legislative Council of Prince Edward Island	Governor of St. John's Island	General Assembly of Prince Edward Island
1786-1893*	House of Assembly of Prince Edward Island	Legislative Council of Prince Edward Island	Lieutenant Governor of Prince Edward Island	General Assembly of Prince Edward Island
1893–present	Legislative Assembly of Prince Edward Island	—N/a	Lieutenant Governor of Prince Edward Island	General Assembly of Prince Edward Island

* The territory's name was changed from St. John's Island to Prince Edward Island in 1798. Before then, the bodies were the House of Assembly of the Island of St. John, Legislative Council of the Island of St. John, Lieutenant Governor of the Island of St. John, and General Assembly of the Island of St. John.

Quebec
Period	Lower house	Upper house	Viceroy	Parliament
1627–1763	—N/a	—N/a	Governor of New France	—N/a
1763–1791	—N/a	Council for the Affairs of the Province of Quebec	Governor of the Province of Quebec	Governor-in-Council
1791–1838	Legislative Assembly of Lower Canada	Legislative Council of Lower Canada	Lieutenant Governor of Lower Canada	Parliament of Lower Canada
1838–1841	—N/a	Special Council of Lower Canada	Lieutenant Governor of Lower Canada	Governor-in-Council
1841–1867	Part of the Province of Canada colony.			
1867–1968	Legislative Assembly of Quebec	Legislative Council of Quebec	Lieutenant Governor of Quebec	Parliament of Quebec
1968–present	National Assembly of Quebec	—N/a	Lieutenant Governor of Quebec	Parliament of Quebec

Saskatchewan
Period	Lower house	Upper house	Viceroy	Parliament
1670–1905	Part of the Northwest Territories and preceding territories.			
1905–present	Legislative Assembly of Saskatchewan	—N/a	Lieutenant Governor of Saskatchewan	Legislature of Saskatchewan

Yukon
Period	Lower house	Upper house	Viceroy	Parliament
????–1898	Part of the Northwest Territories and preceding territories.			
1898–1909	—N/a	Yukon Territorial Council	Governor General of Canada as represented by the Commissioner of Yukon	Commissioner-in-Council
1909–1978	Yukon Territorial Council	—N/a	Governor General of Canada as represented by the Commissioner of Yukon	Commissioner-in-Council
1978–2002	Yukon Legislative Assembly	—N/a	Governor General of Canada as represented by the Commissioner of Yukon	Commissioner-in-Council
2002–present	Yukon Legislative Assembly	—N/a	Governor General of Canada as represented by the Commissioner of Yukon	Legislature of Yukon

=== Past assemblies of former territories and colonies ===
Colony of British Columbia (mainland)
Period	Lower house	Upper house	Viceroy	Parliament
1858–1866	—N/a	Colonial Assembly of British Columbia	Governor of the Colony of British Columbia	Governor-in-Council
1866–present	Part of British Columbia.			

Colony of Cape Breton
Period	Lower house	Upper house	Viceroy	Parliament
1784–1820	—N/a	Cape Breton Council	Lieutenant Governor of Cape Breton	Governor-in-Council
1820–present	Part of Nova Scotia.			

District of Keewatin
Period	Lower house	Upper house	Viceroy	Parliament
1670–1876	Part of Rupert's Land (now Northwest Territories).			
1876–1877	—N/a	Council of Keewatin	Lieutenant Governor of Manitoba and Keewatin	Governor-in-Council
1877–1905	—N/a	—N/a	Lieutenant Governor of Manitoba and Keewatin	—N/a
1905–1999	Part of Northwest Territories.			
1999–present	Part of Nunavut.			

Province of Canada
Period	Lower house	Upper house	Viceroy	Parliament
1627–1791	Part of the Province of Quebec colony.			
1791–1841	Split into Lower Canada (now Quebec) and Upper Canada (now Ontario).			
1841–1867	Legislative Assembly of the Province of Canada	Legislative Council of the Province of Canada	Governor General of the Province of Canada	Parliament of the Province of Canada
1867–1968	Split into Ontario and Quebec.			

Colony of Vancouver Island
Period	Lower house	Upper house	Viceroy	Parliament
1849–1855	—N/a	Legislative Council of Vancouver Island	Governor of Vancouver Island	Governor-in-Council
1855–1866	House of Assembly of Vancouver Island	Legislative Council of Vancouver Island	Governor of Vancouver Island	Legislature of Vancouver Island
1866–present	Part of British Columbia.			
