= Edward Blake-Rudkowski =

Nunatsiavut former politician

Speaker of the Nunatsiavut Assembly
- In office June 7, 2017 – November 23, 2020
- Preceded by: Tyler Edmunds
- Succeeded by: Marlene Winters-Wheeler

Ordinary Member of the Nunatsiavut Assembly for Canada
- In office ? – November 23, 2020

Personal details
- Born: Labrador City, Labrador
- Other political affiliations: New Democratic Party

Edward Blake Rudkowski is a former member of the Nunatsiavut Assembly.

In the 2014 elections in Nunatsiavut, he ran for ordinary member for Canada in the Nunatsiavut Assembly. He got 108 votes in that election, coming in fourth place.

He was the New Democratic Party's candidate for the Labrador electoral district in the 2015 Canadian federal election.

Later, on June 7, 2017, former Nunatsiavut Assembly speaker Tyler Edmunds was appointed Minister of Finance, Human Resources and Information Technology, Rudkowski was nominated as his successor as speaker. He was then re-elected to his seat in the May 1, 2018 elections.

Blake-Rudowski would keep his seat in the Assembly until 2020, when his membership in the Labrador Inuit Enrollment Register was revoked due to him having only 17.14% blood quantum. As a result, he lost his seat in the assembly. Blake-Rudkowski would later question this decision.

He is also the head of the Them Days magazine.

Canada – 2018 Nunatsiavut general election
Name	Vote	%
Edward Blake-Rudkowski	477	38.07%
Roland Saunders	258	20.59%
Lela Evans	234	18.68%
Charlotte Winters-Fost	194	15.48%
Selina Adams	90	7.18%
Total Valid Ballots	1,253	100%

2015 Canadian federal election: Labrador
Party	Candidate	Votes	%	±%	Expenditures
Liberal	Yvonne Jones	8,878	71.75	+23.76	$95,326.13
New Democratic	Edward Rudkowski	1,779	14.38	–4.81	$47,898.82
Conservative	Peter Penashue	1,716	13.87	–18.53	$24,186.27
Total valid votes/expense limit		12,373	99.57		$204,663.38
Total rejected ballots		53	0.43	–0.42	
Turnout		12,426	61.99	+4.00	
Eligible voters		20,045			
Liberal hold		Swing		+14.29	
Source: Elections Canada
