= Jim Lyall (politician) =

Canadian politician and Inuk advocate (1945–2022)

1st President of Nunatsiavut
- In office 2008–2012
- Prime Minister: Stephen Harper
- Premier: Danny Williams; Kathy Dunderdale
- Preceded by: Tony Andersen (acting)
- Succeeded by: Sarah Leo

Personal details
- Born: 1945 Nutak, Newfoundland
- Died: May 13, 2022 (aged 76–77)

Jim Lyall (1945 – 13 May 2022) was a Canadian politician and Inuk advocate who served as the first President of Nunatsiavut.

== Life ==
Lyall was born to Samuel Lyall and Isabella Lyall (née Metcalfe) in Nutak, a community in northern Labrador that was controversially resettled alongside Hebron in the 1950s. Following the resettlement of Nutak, Lyall's family moved to Nain. He served as the mayor of Nain as well as the town's postmaster.

Lyall was educated at the residential schools in Nain and North West River and also completed high school in St. John's. He worked for government-run stores in Labrador after completing his education.

== Nunatsiavut ==
Lyall served as the executive director of Labrador Inuit Association from 1977 to 1981 and again from 2002 until Nunatsiavut's creation in 2005.

In 2008, Nunatsiavut held its first presidential election nearly 2 years after its first general election. Lyall defeated Natan Obed and Johannes Lampe for the position.

In 2011, Lyall oversaw the return of the remains of Inuit bodies from St. John's to Nunatsiavut. These bodies were excavated from Rose Island and Upernavik Island and brought to Newfoundland in the 1970s.

Lyall did not seek re-election in 2012 and was succeeded by Sarah Leo.

In 2017, Lyall was acclaimed Ordinary Member for Nain in a by-election. He was defeated in the 2022 election, coming in third behind Anthony Andersen and Roxanne Barbour.

Lyall died on May 13, 2022, days after his election defeat. He died only a few hours after his wife Jean.
