= Kate Mitchell =

Kate Mitchell may refer to:

- Kate Mitchell (EastEnders), a fictional character from the BBC soap opera EastEnders
- Kate Mitchell (politician), Canadian politician

== See also ==
- Katie Mitchell, English theatre director
- Katie Mitchell, a character from the 2021 film The Mitchells vs. The Machines
