= James Lyall =

James or Jim Lyall may refer to:

- James Lyall (minister) (1827–1905), Presbyterian minister of Australia
- James Broadwood Lyall (1838–1916), administrator in the Indian Civil Service
- Jim Lyall (American football)
- Jim Lyall (politician)

== See also ==
- Charles James Lyall (1845–1920), English civil servant and scholar working in India
