= Marlene Winters-Wheeler =

Inuk politician

Speaker of the Nunatsiavut Assembly
- In office February 2, 2021 – Early 2022
- Preceded by: Edward Blake-Rudkowski

Member of the Nunatsiavut Assembly for Upper Lake Melville
- Incumbent
- Assumed office 2017

Personal details
- Born: Nunatsiavut, Labrador

Marlene Winters-Wheeler is a Canadian Inuk politician in Labrador. She has been the speaker of the Nunatsiavut Assembly since her appointment on Feb. 2, 2021. She represents the constituency of Upper Lake Melville.
