= Sarah Leo =

Canadian politician

2nd President of Nunatsiavut
- In office 2012–2016
- Prime Minister: Stephen Harper; Justin Trudeau
- Premier: Kathy Dunderdale; Tom Marshall; Paul Davis; Dwight Ball
- Preceded by: Jim Lyall
- Succeeded by: Johannes Lampe

Sarah Leo is a Canadian politician. Leo was President of Nunatsiavut, an autonomous Inuit region of Newfoundland and Labrador, Canada. Along with the Nunatsiavut government, she has been critical of the Lower Churchill Project.

== Career ==
From 2006-2010, Leo was the AngajukKâk of Nain.

Leo was first elected as President in 2012 replacing Jim Lyall. She did not seek re-election in the 2016 election.

She is the chief operating officer of the Nunatsiavut Group of Companies.

== Electoral record ==
=== 2012 election ===
==== Round 1 ====
2012 Nunatsiavut presidential election (1st round)
Name	Vote	%
Johannes Lampe	821	38.51%
Sarah Leo	742	34.80%
Susan Nochasak	569	26.69%
Total Valid Ballots	2,132	100%

==== Round 2 ====
2012 Nunatsiavut presidential election (2nd round)
Name	Vote	%
Sarah Leo	1,107	50.83%
Johannes Lampe	1,071	49.17%
Total Valid Ballots	2,178	100%
