= Kate Mitchell (politician) =

Canadian politician

First Minister of Nunatsiavut
- In office 2014–2019

Ordinary Member for Makkovik in the Nunatsaivut Assembly
- In office May 2014 – 2019

Kate Mitchell is a Labrador Inuk politician who served as the First Minister of Nunatsiavut and Minister of Nunatsiavut Affairs from 2014 until her resignation in December 2019. Nunatsiavut is an Inuit self-governing region located within the Canadian province of Newfoundland and Labrador

== Career ==
Mitchell's political platform included advocating for seniors, tackling housing shortages, enforcing a recent land claims agreement, and government transparency. Mitchell was elected as the Ordinary Member for Makkovik in the Nunatsaivut Assembly in May 2014. She resigned from her position as First Minister in 2019 after allegations that she acted inappropriately in a housing matter and was replaced by Tony Andersen. She continued to serve as the Ordinary Member for Makkovik until she resigned from that position in December 2019.

== Controversy and resignation ==
On December 2, 2019, Nunatsiavut President Johannes Lampe announced that Mitchell had stepped down from her executive roles following allegations that she had acted inappropriately by interfering in the operations of the independent Torngat Regional Housing Association. President Lampe noted that adherence to strict administrative protocols was necessary to protect the institutional credibility of the government during a regional housing crisis, prompting the immediate appointment of Anthony Andersen to fill her portfolios on an interim basis. Although Mitchell initially planned to retain her legislative seat, she officially resigned from the Nunatsiavut Assembly entirely on December 18, 2019, and was later permanently succeeded as First Minister by Tyler Edmunds.
