= Natan Obed =

Canadian politician

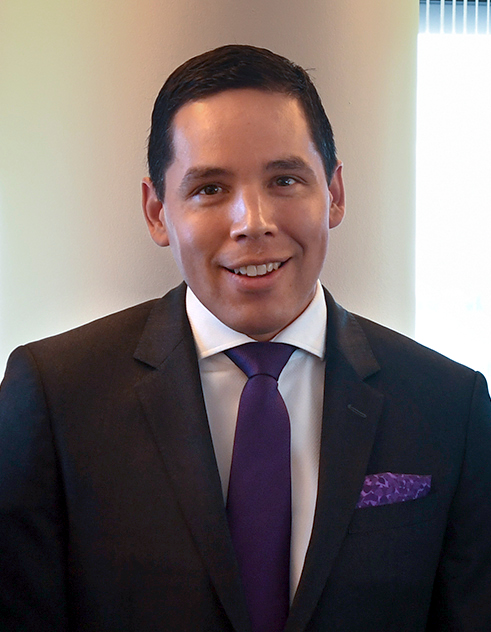
- Obed in 2016

15th President of the Inuit Tapiriit Kanatami
- Incumbent
- Assumed office September 2015
- Preceded by: Terry Audla

Personal details
- Born: 1975 or 1976 (age 50–51) Fredericton, New Brunswick, Canada
- Education: Tufts University

Natan Obed (born 1976) is a Canadian politician who has served as president of the Inuit Tapiriit Kanatami (ITK) since September 2015.

== Early life ==
Obed was born in Fredericton, New Brunswick and moved to Nain, Nunatsiavut, which he considers his hometown, as a child. He moved to Maine at the age of 12 with his mother after his parents separated.

Obed stayed in the United States for college when he received a scholarship to Tufts University in Boston. He graduated from Tufts with an English and American Studies degree in 2001.

After graduation, he returned to Canada and worked for the Labrador Inuit Association and was Director of Social and Cultural Development for Nunavut Tunngavik Inc., the organization that represents the rights of Nunavut Inuit.

== Political career ==
In 2008, Obed was a candidate in Nunatsiavut's first presidential election. He was defeated by Jim Lyall.

On September 17, 2015, Obed was elected president of the Inuit Tapiriit Kanatami, a national organization that represents Inuit across Canada. Obed regularly speaks out about issues affecting the Arctic and Inuit community, such as the colonial harm of the Edmonton Eskimos football team's moniker, the poor press coverage of the Prime Minister's apology for the government's role in the mistreatment of Inuit with tuberculosis in the 1940s to 1960s, and the suicide epidemic.

In 2016, he authored a report, "Inuit Priorities for Canada's Climate Strategy: A Canadian Inuit Vision for Our Common Future in Our Homelands", and in 2019 the federal government committed $1 million toward implementing the strategy.

In 2018, Maclean's named him one of five politicians to watch. He currently lives in Iqaluit, Nunavut, with his wife and two sons.

From 2025, Obed is serving as the vice chair representing Canada at the Inuit Circumpolar Council.
