= Nunatsiavut Assembly =

Legislative branch of Nunatsiavut, Canada

Nunatsiavut Assembly Nunatsiavut katimajitsuangit

Type
- Type: Unicameral

Leadership
- President: Johannes Lampe, non-partisan consensus government since 2016
- First Minister: David Dicker Jr., non-partisan consensus government since May 19, 2026
- Speaker of the Nunatsiavut Assembly: Bryan Winters, non-partisan consensus government since May 19, 2026
- Seats: 18

Meeting place
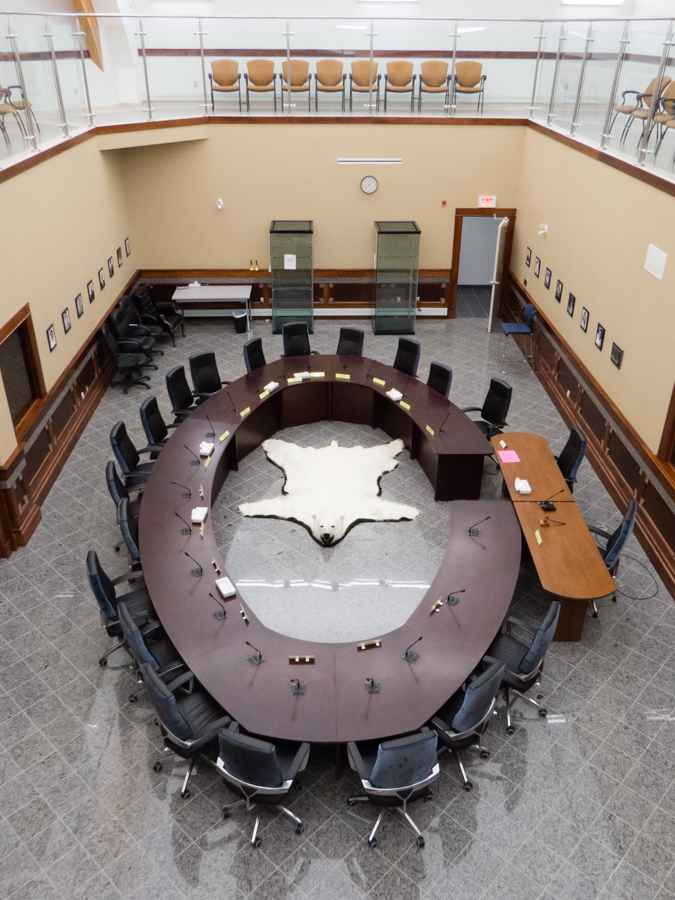
- Nunatsiavut Assembly Building, Hopedale, Newfoundland and Labrador

Website
- Nunatsiavut Assembly

The Nunatsiavut Assembly is the legislative branch of the government of Nunatsiavut, Canada.

== History ==
On January 22, 2005, the Inuit of Nunatsiavut signed the Labrador Inuit Lands Claims Agreement with the federal and provincial governments covering 72,520 km^{2} (28,000 sq mi) of land, including the entire northern salient of Labrador north of Nain as well as a portion of the Atlantic coast south of there. The agreement also includes 44,030 km^{2} (17,000 sq mi) of sea rights. Although the Inuit will not own the whole area, they were granted special rights related to traditional land use, and they will own 15,800 km^{2} (6,100 sq mi) designated Labrador Inuit Lands.

The Labrador Inuit Lands Claims Agreement is a treaty between the Inuit of Labrador, the provincial government of Newfoundland and Labrador, and the federal government of Canada, that is constitutionally protected under the aboriginal and treaty rights of Indigenous peoples in Canada granted by section 35 of the Constitution Act, 1982.

The agreement was ratified by the Labrador Inuit, the Newfoundland and Labrador House of Assembly, and the Parliament of Canada, where it received Royal Assent on June 23, 2005.

On December 1, 2005, the constitution was formally adopted, and a swearing-in ceremony was held for the first cabinet, an interim government which consisted of members of the Labrador Inuit Association board of directors. This day marked the official transfer of power from the provincial government to the newly formed Government of Nunatsiavut "to make their own laws relating to cultural affairs, education and health".

In October 2006, Nunatsiavut held its first election to form a nine-member government, which was sworn in on October 16 in Hopedale.

The current Nunatsiavut Assembly Building in Hopedale opened in 2012.

Marlene Winters-Wheeler became speaker in February 2021.

== Electoral system ==
The Nunatsiavut Assembly consists of 10 ordinary members (6 for Nunatsiavut and 4 for its diaspora), the president of Nunatsiavut and the heads of the Inuit Community governments and corporations. Nain, Canada and Upper Lake Melville are each represented by 2 members while Hopedale, Makkovik, Postville and Rigolet are each represented by 1 member. Only Inuit residents of each constituency can vote in Nunatsiavut's elections (Inuit make up 88% of Nunatsiavut's population) while minorities are represented in municipal councils which each have a non-Inuit member to promote minority interests. Nunatsiavut does not use a party system.

== Current members ==
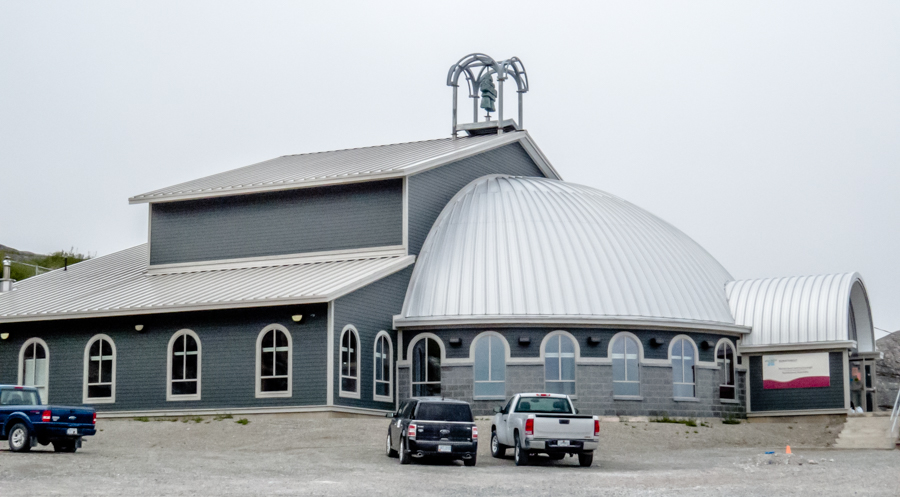
Nunatsiavut Assembly Building

| Riding | Member |
|---|---|
Nunatsiavut
| Hopedale | McKinley Winters |
| Makkovik | Tom Evans |
| Nain | David Dicker Jr. Roxanne Barbour |
| Postville | Glen Sheppard |
| Rigolet | Melva Williams |
Other areas
| Canada | Gerald Asivak; Bryan Winters |
| Upper Lake Melville | Wally Andersen; Kim Oliver |

=== Additional members ===
The President of Nunatsiavut also serves on the Nunatsiavut Assembly. The holder of this role since 2016 is Johannes Lampe.

==== Inuit Community Government heads ====
The heads of the Inuit Community governments (official title is "AngajukKâk", serve a similar role as a Mayor) also serve in the assembly.

| Inuit Community Government | Member |
|---|---|
| AngajukKâk for Hopedale | Majorie Flowers |
| AngajukKâk for Makkovik | Barry Andersen |
| AngajukKâk for Nain | Tony Andersen |
| AngajukKâk for Postville | Melanie Gear |
| AngajukKâk for Rigolet | Chesley Sheppard |

Additionally, the chairperson of the NunaKatiget Community Corporation and the chairperson of the Sivunivut Inuit Community Corporation serve on the Nunatsiavut Assembly. The 2 corporations represent the Inuit of Upper Lake Melville (Sivunivut represents North West River while NunaKatiget represents Happy Valley-Goose Bay and Mud Lake).

| Corporation | Chairperson |
|---|---|
| NunaKatiget Community Corporation | Patricia Kemuksigak |
| Sivunivut Inuit Community Corporation | Jeffrey Montague |

== Executive Council ==
| Portfolio | Minister | District |
|---|---|---|
| First Minister | David Dicker Jr. | Nain |
| Finance, Human Resources, & Information Technology | Melva Williams | Rigolet |
| Education & Economic Development | Gerald Asivak | Canada |
| Health & Social Development | Roxanne Barbour | Hopedale |
| Lands & Natural Resources | Tom Evans | Makkovik |
| Language, Culture, & Tourism | McKinley Winters | AngajukKâk of Hopedale |

== First Ministers of Nunatsiavut ==
- Kate Mitchell
- Anthony Andersen
