= Anthony Andersen =

Labrador Inuk politician

Tony Anderson

Acting President of Nunatsiavut
- In office November 14, 2007 – December 14, 2007
- Preceded by: William Andersen III

First Minister of Nunatsiavut (acting from 2019-2022)
- In office 2019–2022
- Preceded by: Kate Mitchell
- Succeeded by: Melva Williams

Member of the Nunatsiavut Assembly for Nain
- Incumbent
- Assumed office 2022

AngajukKâk (Mayor) of Nain
- In office 2006–2008
- Preceded by: Incorporation*
- Succeeded by: Joe Dicker

Anthony Andersen is a Labrador Inuk politician who has served as First Minister of the Nunatsiavut Assembly since 2019.

== Personal life ==
He was born to Edgar Andersen and Muriel Andersen. His brother Wally Andersen is also currently a member of the Nunatsiavut Assembly and so is his nephew Thomas Evans. His niece Lela Evans was elected to the House of Assembly of Newfoundland and Labrador in 2019, defeating his nephew Randy Edmunds.

== Career ==
Andersen briefly served as President of Nunatsiavut following the resignation of William Andersen III. He has also served as the AngajukKâk of Nain.

He replaced Kate Mitchell as First Minister of Nunatsiavut after her resignation. Andersen is one of 2 members of the Nunatsiavut Assembly that represents Nain.

In 2022, Andersen was appointed as First Minister following a general election. However, he resigned that same year.
