= Nunatsiavut Assembly Building =

Coordinates: 55.457846°N 60.221969°W

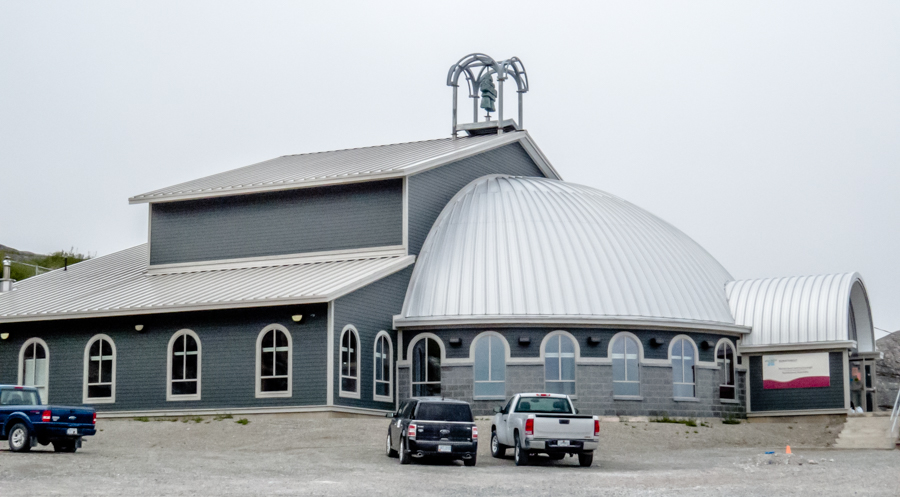
- Interactive map of the Nunatsiavut Assembly Building area

General information
- Architectural style: Postmodern with influences from Inuit and Moravian mission architecture
- Location: Hopedale, Newfoundland and Labrador, Canada
- Client: Government of Nunatsiavut

Design and construction
- Architect: Inuit Canadian Consultants Limited

The Nunatsiavut Assembly Building in Hopedale, Newfoundland and Labrador is the seat of the autonomous Nunatsiavut Assembly.

The building opened in 2012 and is the Assembly's first permanent home since it first sat in 2008. The Assembly previously met in temporary locations around Hopedale. The building is located at Nanuk Hill with Amos Comenius Memorial School located just to the north and a new residential area to the west.

== Facilities and Features ==
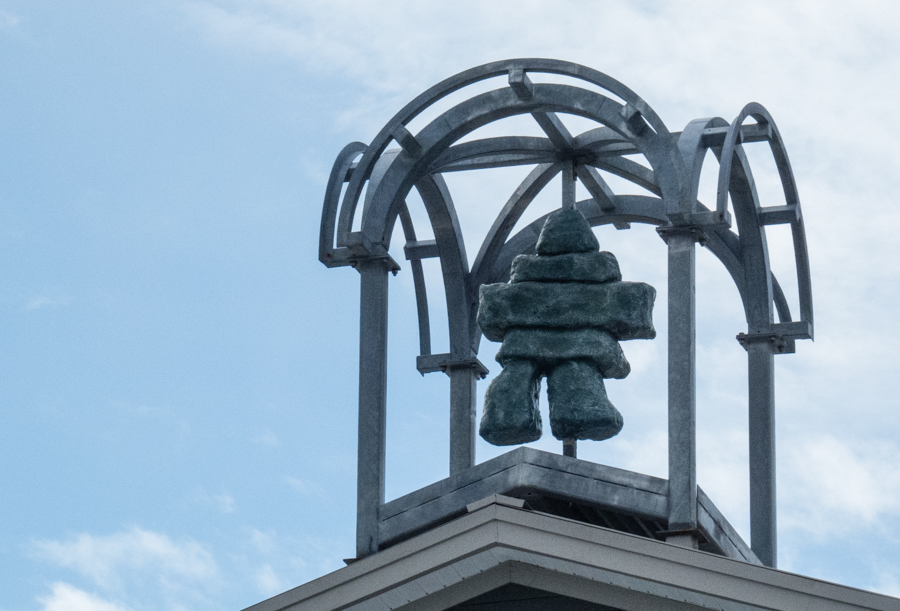
Inukshuk in the steeple on the roof of the Nunatsiavut Assembly Building

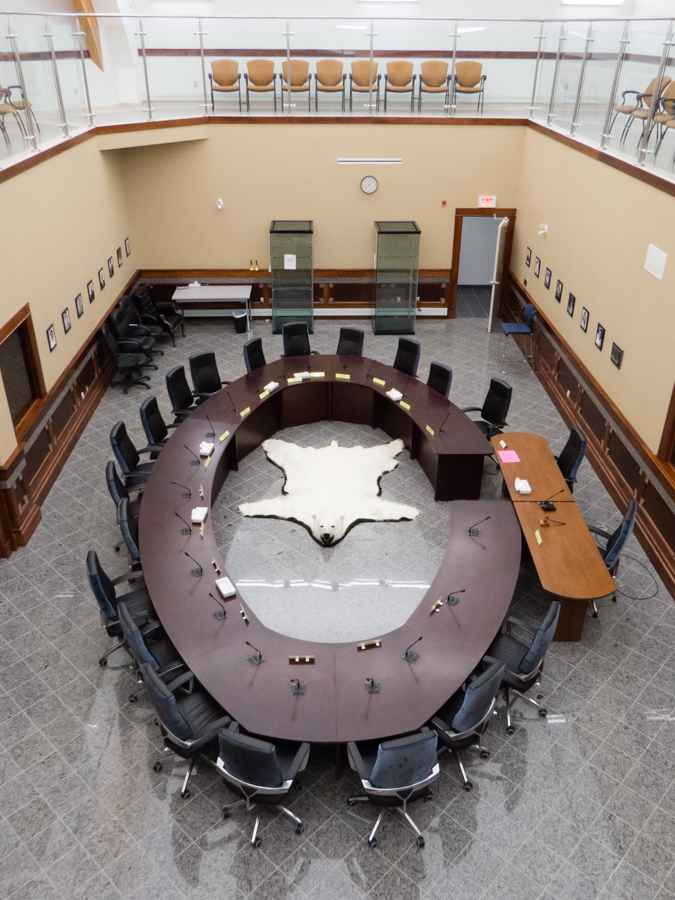
Assembly Chambers

The building has 10,000 square feet (929 square metres) of space with various rooms:

- Nunatsiavut Assembly Chambers - used by the Legislative Assembly
- Assembly Caucus Room
- Nunatsiavut Government offices
- Assembly members offices

There is a large common room that is used for community events, public meetings, and used by the Newfoundland and Labrador Department of Justice for provincial court sessions.

The Assembly building's front is an Igloo inspired topped by a half dome and rear structure pays homage to the nearby Hopedale Moravian Mission Complex (windows and steeple are borrowed from the mission but topped with a large green Inukshuk).

Other elements of the Labrador Inuit culture which have been incorporated into the design include the floors being tiled with labradorite and the Assembly members taking seats at a table in the form of an ulu.

== Other government buildings ==
- Nunatsiavut Government Head Office - administrative offices of the Government of Nunatsiavut located in Nain, Newfoundland and Labrador

== See also ==
- Confederation Building (Newfoundland and Labrador)
- Legislative Building of Nunavut
