= Hopedale, Newfoundland and Labrador =

Hopedale Agvituk
- Inuit community
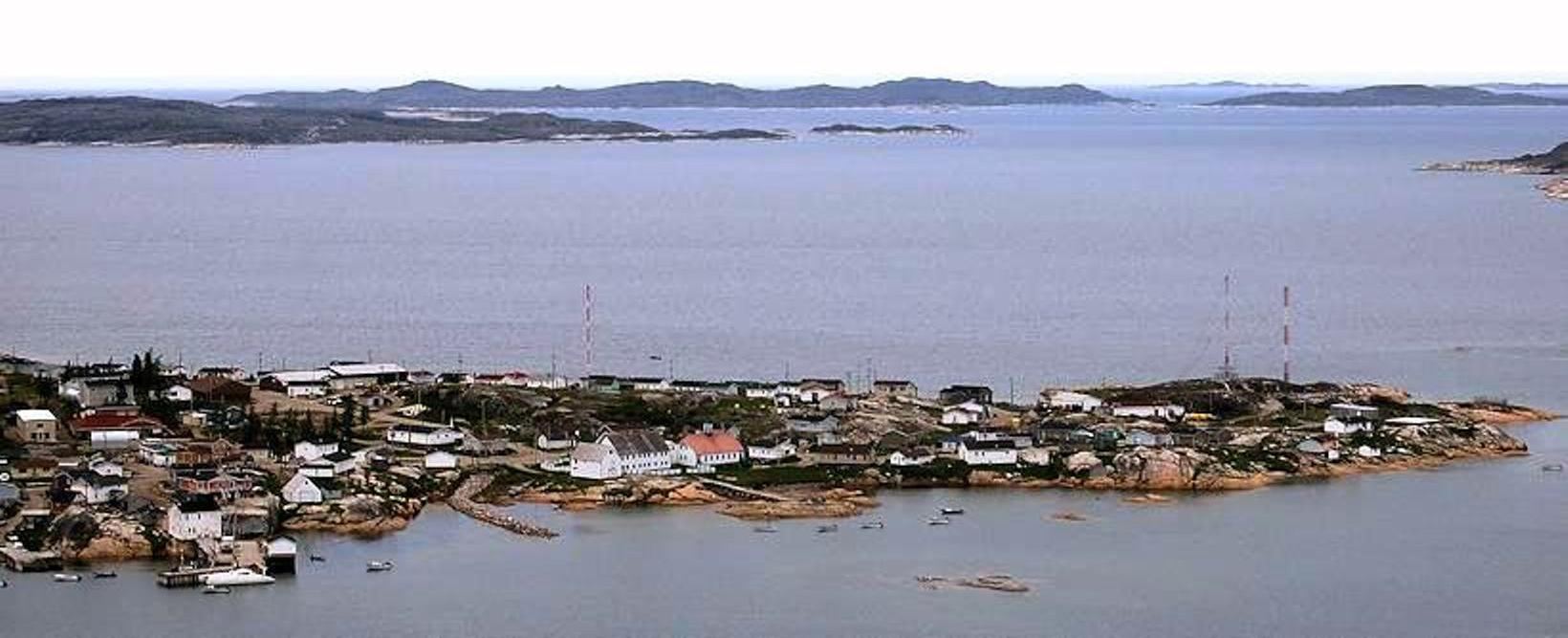
- Hopedale
- Nickname: Place of the Whales
- Location of Hopedale in Labrador
- Coordinates: 55°27′39″N 60°14′00″W
- Country: Canada
- Province: Newfoundland and Labrador
- Region: Nunatsiavut
- Settled: 1782
- Incorporated: May 12, 1969

Government
  - Type: Inuit Community Government
  - Mayor (AngajukKâk): Marjorie Flowers
  - Federal MP: Philip Earle (L)
  - Provincial MHA: Lela Evans (PC)
  - Nunatsiavut Assembly member: Terry Vincent (I)

Area
  - Land: 3.35 km^{2} (1.29 sq mi)

Population (2021)
  - Total: 596
  - Density: 157.9/km^{2} (409/sq mi)
- Time zone: UTC-04:00 (AST)
  - Summer (DST): UTC-03:00 (ADT)
- Area code: 709
- Climate: Dfc

Hopedale (Inuit language: Agvituk) is a town located in the north of Labrador, the mainland portion of the Canadian province of Newfoundland and Labrador. Hopedale is the legislative capital of the Inuit Land Claims Area Nunatsiavut, and where the Nunatsiavut Assembly meets. As of the 2021 census, it has a population of 596.

== History ==
Hopedale was founded as an Inuit settlement named Agvituk, Inuktitut for "place of the whales". In 1782, Moravian missionaries from Germany arrived in the area to convert the population. They renamed the settlement Hopedale (Hoffental in German) shortly afterwards. The Hopedale Mission is still standing and is thought to be the oldest wooden-frame building in Canada standing east of Quebec. As such, it was named a National Historic Site of Canada. It is currently run by the Agvituk Historical Society as a part of a museum on the history of missionaries in the area.

From 1953 to 1968, a joint Royal Canadian Air Force-United States Air Force's Hopedale Air Station was located on the hills above Hopedale. Civilian personnel lived in the main part of town. Since 1968, the area has remained abandoned other than maintenance of non-military communications towers nearby.

=== Nunatsiavut ===
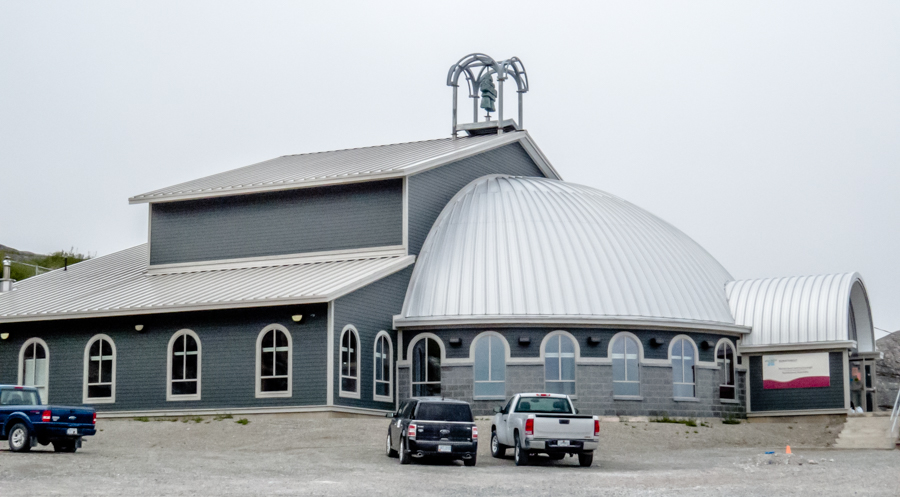
Nunatsiavut Assembly Building

On December 1, 2005, Hopedale became the legislative capital of the autonomous region of Nunatsiavut which is the name chosen by the Labrador Inuit when the Labrador Inuit Land Claims Agreement Act was successfully ratified by the Canadian Government and the Inuit of Labrador. Nain, further north, is the administrative capital. The land claim cedes limited self-rule for the Nunatsiavut government in Northern Labrador and North-Eastern Quebec, granting title and aboriginal rights. The land that comprises the Nunatsiavut government is called the Labrador Inuit Settlement Area, or LISA, which amount to approximately 72,500 km^{2} (28,000 sq mi). The Inuit of Labrador do not own this land per se, but they do have special rights related to traditional land use as aboriginals. That said, the Labrador Inuit will own 15,000 km^{2} (5,800 sq mi) within the Settlement Area, officially designated as Labrador Inuit Lands. The Agreement also provides for the establishment of the Torngat Mountains National Park Reserve, consisting of about 9,600 square kilometres (3,700 sq mi) of land within LISA. As legislative capital, Hopedale is the location of the Nunatsiavut Assembly Building.

== Demographics ==
In the 2021 Census of Population conducted by Statistics Canada, Hopedale had a population of 596 living in 193 of its 208 total private dwellings, a change of 3.8% from its 2016 population of 574. With a land area of 2.18 km^{2} (0.84 sq mi), it had a population density of 273.4/km^{2} (708.1/sq mi) in 2021.

The majority of people in Hopedale (79%) speak English as a first language, but a significant minority (21%) speak Inuktitut.

About 83% of the population identify themselves as Inuit, 16% are of mainly European descent, and 1% are of Punjabi origin.

About 87% of the population belongs to a Protestant denomination, about 2% are Roman Catholic, and another 1% are Sikh. About 10% are not affiliated with any religion.

== Transportation ==
There are no roads that connect Hopedale with the rest of Newfoundland and Labrador.

Hopedale Airport, a small public airport, connects the area with small communities in Newfoundland and Labrador and connections beyond made via Goose Bay Airport. The airport was built in the mid 1960s to provide air support to former USAF Hopedale Air Station. Since 1968 the airport is used by civilians.

The airport handles only small turboprop aircraft or helicopters. There is only one service building at the airport. The airport is connected to Hopedale via Airstrip Road.

Between mid-June and mid-November (pending ice conditions), the ferry MV Kamutik W, operated by the Newfoundland and Labrador Government, provides weekly service from Goose Bay along the Atlantic Coast, with stops in Rigolet, Makkovik, Postville, Hopedale, Nain, and Natuashish. Small boats are used to access nearby areas by water.

Local land based transportation in the community is made by private vehicles (cars, trucks, ATV) and snowmobile in winter. There are only a few roads in the community, all gravel:

- Airstrip Road - access to Hopedale Airport
- American Road - former access road to USAF radar stations and barracks
- Carpenter Road and Drive - serves new residential area
- Government Road - former route home to non-military personnel for former USAF radar station
- Nanuk Road
- Water Road - road to main part of Hopedale

== Services ==
Policing in Hopedale is provided by the Royal Canadian Mounted Police which has a Hopedale Detachment staffed by four officers. The current detachment was completed in 1994.

There is no hospital located in Hopedale and only basic medical services are provided by Hopedale Community Clinic. The clinic is operated by Newfoundland and Labrador Health Services and is staffed by three nurses/nurse practitioners. Physicians visit periodically, and are also available by video conference. Advanced care requires patients to be flown out of town by air ambulance to the nearest hospital, which is in Happy Valley-Goose Bay.

Hopedale Volunteer Fire Department is a small fire and rescue service with a single pumper stored at the fire hall located next to the RCMP detachment near Water Road.

Canada Post has a post office (19 Harbour Drive B) located in town.

Amos Comenius Memorial School at Nanuk Hill, with grades Kindergarten to Grade 12, is the only school in Hopedale.

== Government ==
AngajukKâk are equivalent of mayor in Hopedale and are elected every four years.

== Local attractions ==
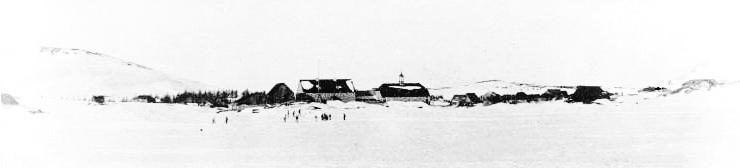
Hopedale, Moravian mission, Labrador, NL, 1881–85

There are few local attractions:

- Moravian Mission Complex and Museum
- Mid-Canada Line Site 200 - a former American and RCAF facility and was the most easterly repeater radar station and with view of Hopedale from the highest point in town
  - Tropospheric scatter antennas and concrete base of former Radome

== Climate ==
Hopedale has a subarctic climate (Köppen: Dfc) with an August average of 12.3 °C (54.1 °F) and February average of −16.4 °C (2.5 °F). It features short, mild summers, and long, very cold, and very snowy winters. It also has a long seasonal lag, with February and August being its coldest and warmest month, respectively.

Climate data for Hopedale (AUT) Coordinates 55°27′N 60°13′W; elevation: 10 m (33 ft); 1991–2020, extremes 1942–present
Month	Jan	Feb	Mar	Apr	May	Jun	Jul	Aug	Sep	Oct	Nov	Dec	Year
Record high humidex	4.5	2.7	5.6	13.5	25.0	31.2	34.0	33.4	30.1	20.4	14.6	6.4	34.0
Record high °C (°F)	8.3 (46.9)	7.2 (45.0)	10.0 (50.0)	13.7 (56.7)	28.3 (82.9)	31.1 (88.0)	33.3 (91.9)	30.7 (87.3)	27.2 (81.0)	20.6 (69.1)	13.5 (56.3)	8.9 (48.0)	33.3 (91.9)
Mean daily maximum °C (°F)	−12.2 (10.0)	−12.4 (9.7)	−6.9 (19.6)	−0.3 (31.5)	4.9 (40.8)	10.1 (50.2)	15.3 (59.5)	16.0 (60.8)	12.0 (53.6)	5.6 (42.1)	−0.5 (31.1)	−6.6 (20.1)	2.1 (35.8)
Daily mean °C (°F)	−15.8 (3.6)	−16.4 (2.5)	−11.1 (12.0)	−4.1 (24.6)	1.7 (35.1)	6.6 (43.9)	11.5 (52.7)	12.3 (54.1)	8.5 (47.3)	3.3 (37.9)	−2.9 (26.8)	−9.6 (14.7)	−1.3 (29.7)
Mean daily minimum °C (°F)	−19.4 (−2.9)	−20.4 (−4.7)	−15.3 (4.5)	−7.8 (18.0)	−1.5 (29.3)	3.1 (37.6)	7.7 (45.9)	8.8 (47.8)	5.4 (41.7)	1.0 (33.8)	−5.3 (22.5)	−12.5 (9.5)	−4.7 (23.5)
Record low °C (°F)	−40.0 (−40.0)	−40.0 (−40.0)	−35.0 (−31.0)	−28.2 (−18.8)	−17.2 (1.0)	−5.6 (21.9)	−1.1 (30.0)	1.1 (34.0)	−5.0 (23.0)	−12.2 (10.0)	−20.6 (−5.1)	−30.0 (−22.0)	−40.0 (−40.0)
Record low wind chill	−52.5	−51.8	−50.8	−38.6	−18.8	−9.6	0.0	0.0	−7.3	−16.6	−29.3	−45.6	−52.5
Average precipitation mm (inches)	75.1 (2.96)	77.7 (3.06)	79.1 (3.11)	56.3 (2.22)	50.7 (2.00)	65.2 (2.57)	86.0 (3.39)	70.2 (2.76)	57.9 (2.28)	68.3 (2.69)	64.8 (2.55)	70.6 (2.78)	822.0 (32.36)
Average rainfall mm (inches)	3.5 (0.14)	3.2 (0.13)	3.4 (0.13)	8.3 (0.33)	24.2 (0.95)	58.3 (2.30)	85.4 (3.36)	70.2 (2.76)	55.5 (2.19)	48.2 (1.90)	13.7 (0.54)	4.3 (0.17)	378.1 (14.89)
Average snowfall cm (inches)	72.4 (28.5)	75.2 (29.6)	76.5 (30.1)	48.3 (19.0)	25.2 (9.9)	6.6 (2.6)	0.6 (0.2)	0.0 (0.0)	2.4 (0.9)	20.2 (8.0)	51.2 (20.2)	67.2 (26.5)	445.8 (175.5)
Average precipitation days (≥ 0.2 mm)	16	14	16	14	13	13	15	15	13	14	16	17	175
Average rainy days (≥ 0.2 mm)	1.0	trace	2	3	8	12	15	15	13	10	4	2	86
Average snowy days (≥ 0.2 cm)	16	13	15	13	8	2	trace	0	trace	8	13	16	105
Average relative humidity (%) (at 3pm)	78	79	80	80	78	74	75	74	71	75	81	79	77
Source: Environment Canada (rain/rain days, snow/snow days, precipitation/precipitation days and humidity 1961–1990)

== See also ==
- Hopedale Air Station
- List of cities and towns in Newfoundland and Labrador
- Jens Haven
- Nunatsiavut
- Nunatsiavut Assembly Building
