= Johannes Lampe =

Canadian politician

3rd President of Nunatsiavut
- Incumbent
- Assumed office May 6, 2016
- Prime Minister: Justin Trudeau; Mark Carney
- Premier: Dwight Ball; Andrew Furey; John Hogan; Tony Wakeham
- Preceded by: Sarah Leo

Personal details
- Born: Nutak, Newfoundland and Labrador

Johannes Lampe is a Canadian politician who is the current President of Nunatsiavut, an autonomous Inuit region of the Canadian province of Newfoundland and Labrador.

== Career ==
Lampe was sworn in as president in May 2016 after being the only candidate for the role. He hopes to preserve the Inuit culture, identity and language. Before becoming president, he served as a member of the Nunatsiavut Assembly for Nain and he served as Minister of Culture, Recreation and Tourism.

Lampe was re-elected in 2020. In 2024, being the only candidate to come forward for the Nunatsiavut President seat, Lampe was acclaimed for a third term on April 3, 2024.

=== Repatriation of Labrador Inuit Human Remains ===
On May 23, 2011, as Nunatsiavut's Minister of Culture, Recreation and Tourism, Lampe participated in the repatriation of the remains of 22 individuals held at the Chicago Field Museum. These remains had been removed from marked graves in Zoar during the Rawson-MacMillan sub-Arctic expedition of 1927-28. In 2017, Nunatsiavut Government and The Field Museum received the first Inuit Cultural Repatriation Award from Inuit Tapiriit Kanatami's President Natan Obed for the work they did leading to the successful return of the human remains.

In 2014, Lampe was selected by the Nunatsiavut Government and Nain's Inuit Elders Committee to accompany the film crew of the documentary Trapped in a Human Zoo to retrace the steps of Abraham Ulrikab in Europe and to see his remains at the Museum National d'Histoire Naturelle in Paris. This was to be the first step in Nunatsiavut's eventual request to have the remains repatriated to Labrador.

=== Lower Churchill Project ===
In June 2016, he led a protest at the office of MHA Perry Trimper.

== Electoral record ==
=== 2020 presidential election ===
2020 Nunatsiavut presidential election
Name	Vote	%
Johannes Lampe	1,015	65.57%
Andrea Webb	533	34.43%

=== 2016 presidential election ===
2016 Nunatsiavut presidential election
Name	Vote	%
Johannes Lampe	acclaimed	

=== 2014 general election ===
Nunatsiavut general election, 2014: Nain (2 members)
Name	Vote
Sean Lyall	367
Richard Pamak	243
Joe Dicker	181
Jim Lyall	150
Johannes Lampe	134
William Barbour	101

=== 2012 presidential election ===
==== Round 1 ====
Nunatsiavut presidential election, 2012 (1st round)
Name	Vote	%
Johannes Lampe	821	38.51%
Sarah Leo	742	34.80%
Susan Nochasak	569	26.69%
Total Valid Ballots	2,132	100%

==== Round 2 ====
Nunatsiavut presidential election, 2012 (2nd round)
Name	Vote	%
Sarah Leo	1,107	50.83%
Johannes Lampe	1,071	49.17%
Total Valid Ballots	2,178	100%

=== 2008 presidential election ===
Nunatsiavut presidential election, 2008
Name	Vote	%
Jim Lyall		
Natan Obed		
Johannes Lampe		
Zippie Nochasak		

== See also ==
- List of people of Newfoundland and Labrador
