= Simon Pokue =

Chief of the Mushuau Innu

Simon Pokue was the Utshmau or chief of the Mushuau Innu First Nation in Newfoundland and Labrador, Canada from May 2004 until May 2007, when he was replaced by Utshmau Prote Poker. He was elected as deputy chief in March 2010.
