= Prote Poker =

Chief of the Mushuau Innu

- Born: 1962 (age 62–63); Canada
- Occupation: First Nations chief

Prote Poker (born 1952) is a former Utshmau (chief) of the Mushuau Innu First Nation in the Canadian province of Newfoundland and Labrador, who served between 2007 and 2010. He was selected by the Mushuau Innu in May 2007, replacing the incumbent Utshmau Simon Pokue. He championed an alcohol ban in the community, which was approved in 2008. He was defeated by Simeon Tshakapesh when he ran for re-election in March 2010. He and others later launched a lawsuit alleging that the election was tainted, including the use of alcohol to buy votes. Tshakapesh denied the allegations.
